= List of science fiction editors =

This is a list of science fiction editors, editors working for book and magazine publishing companies who have edited science fiction. Many have also edited works of fantasy and other related genres, all of which have been sometimes grouped under the name speculative fiction.

Editors on this list should fulfill the conditions for Notability for creative professionals in science fiction or related genres. Evidence for notability includes an existing wiki-biography, or evidence that one could be written. Borderline cases should be discussed on the article's talk page.

== A ==
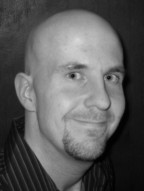
John Joseph Adams, 2006

- John Joseph Adams (born 1976), US, anthologist and editor
- Brian W. Aldiss (1925–2017), UK, anthologist, critic, and author
- Susan Allison, US, editor-in-chief and vice-president at Ace Books
- Lou Anders, US, editor of Argosy Magazine (2003–2004); anthologist; editorial director of Pyr, an imprint of Prometheus Books
- Lou Aronica (born 1958), US, publisher and editor, founded the Bantam Spectra Line
- Ellen Asher, US, editor-in-chief of Science Fiction Book Club (1973–2007)
- Mike Ashley, (born 1948), UK, author, editor and anthologist
- Lady Cynthia Asquith (1887–1960), UK, writer and ghost story anthologist

== B ==
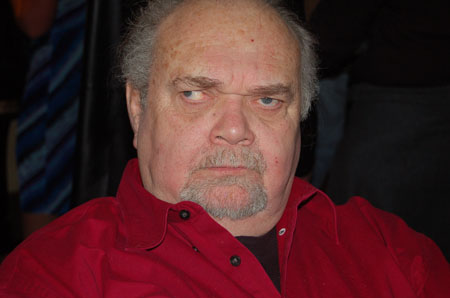
Charles N. Brown, 1937 - 2009

- Jim Baen (1943–2006), US, editor and publisher; founded Baen Books(1983), Webscriptions (now Baen Ebooks), the Baen Free Library and Jim Baen's Universe webzine
- Hilary Bailey (born 1936), UK, editor of New Worlds anthologies #7-10.
- Harry Bates (1900–1981), US, editor of Astounding Science Fiction, Strange Tales, and Weird Tales
- Jeff Berkwits, editor of Amazing Stories, 2005
- John Betancourt (born 1963), US, founded Wildside Press; edited Weird Tales; SF editor for Byron Preiss Books
- Sir Charles Lloyd Birkin (1907–1986), UK, editor of the Creeps Library of horror fiction anthologies (1932–1936)
- Caitlin Blasdell, US, formerly editor at HarperCollins and Avon Books, now a literary agent
- Everett F. Bleiler (1920–2010), US, anthologist, usually with T. E. Dikty
- Kyril Bonfiglioli (1929–1985), UK, editor of Science Fantasy magazine
- Anthony Boucher (1911–1968), US, founding editor of The Magazine of Fantasy & Science Fiction
- Ben Bova (born 1932), US, writer, editor of Analog Science Fiction and Fact (1971–1978); fiction editor of Omni Magazine (1978–1982)
- Stacy Boyd, US, romance editor, Harlequin Luna (2001–present),
- Marion Zimmer Bradley (1930–1999), US, writer, founder and editor of Marion Zimmer Bradley's Fantasy Magazine
- Jennifer Brehl, US, senior editor at HarperCollins
- Kent Brewster, (born 1961), US, editor of Speculations
- Damien Broderick, (1944–2025), Australia/US, SF editor for Australian popular science bi-monthly Cosmos
- Keith Brooke, (born 1966), UK, author, anthologist, publisher of Infinity Plus
- Charles N. Brown (1937–2009), US, founder and editor of Locus news magazine
- Howard Browne (1908–1999), US, editor of Amazing Stories (1950–1956)
- Ginjer Buchanan (born 1944), US, editor-in-chief of Berkley-Ace-Roc Books
- Algis Budrys (1931–2008), US, writer, juror and editor of the Writers of the Future contest and anthology series, editor and publisher Tomorrow Speculative Fiction 1993-2000

== C ==
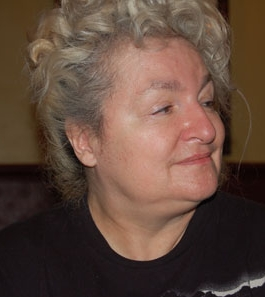
Pat Cadigan

- Pat Cadigan, (born 1953), US, author; editor of Shayol #1-7 (1977–1985); co-editor of Chacal (1977)
- Bill Campbell, co-editor of anthology Mothership: Tales from Afrofuturism and Beyond (2013)
- John W. Campbell, Jr. (1910–1971), US, Golden Age editor of Astounding Science Fiction (later Analog) magazine, considered the single most important and influential editor in the history of science fiction
- E.J. "Ted" Carnell (1912–1972), UK, editor of New Worlds magazine (1949–1963); anthologist
- Terry Carr (1937–1987), US, editor at Ace Books, founder of Ace Science Fiction Specials line
- Lin Carter (1930–1988), US, editor of the Ballantine Adult Fantasy series
- Richard Chizmar (born 1965), publisher and editor of Cemetery Dance Publications
- Neil Clarke (born 1966), US, editor of Clarkesworld Magazine, publisher (Wyrm Publishing)
- Keith Clayton, US, editor at Del Rey Books
- Groff Conklin (1904–1968), US, anthologist and critic
- Kathryn Cramer (born 1962), US, editor and anthologist
- Edmund Crispin (1921–1978), UK, author and composer, editor of seven volumes of Best Science Fiction
- Peter Crowther (born 1949), UK, editor, publisher (PS Publishing) and anthologist

== D ==
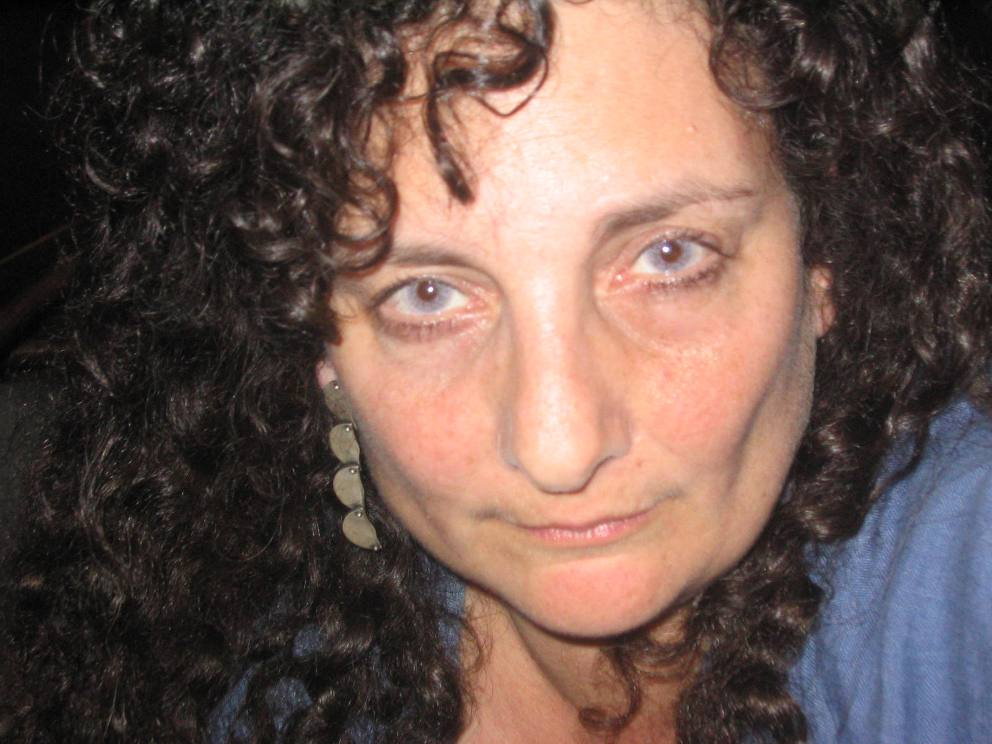
Ellen Datlow, 2008

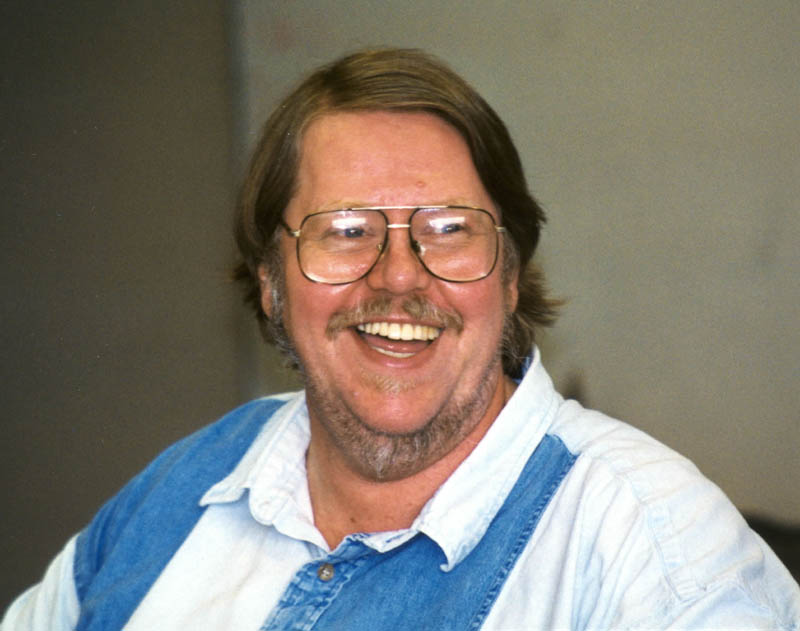
Gardner Dozois, 1998

- Tony Daniel (science fiction writer) (born 1963), US, editor; Baen Books
- Richard Dalby (born 1949), UK, supernatural fiction editor and anthologist
- Jack Dann (born 1945), US/Australia, anthologist, consulting editor for Tor Books
- Peter Darvill-Evans (born 1954) UK, editor of Doctor Who novels
- Ellen Datlow (born 1949), US, anthologist and fiction editor at Omni / Event Horizon and Sci Fiction (2000–2005)
- Avram Davidson (1923–1993), US, writer, editor of The Magazine of Fantasy & Science Fiction (1962–1964)
- Judy-Lynn del Rey (1943–1986), US, editor, co-founded Del Rey Books, edited Stellar original anthology series (1974–1981); won Hugo Award for Best Professional Editor posthumously (declined)
- Lester del Rey (1915–1993), US, author, co-founded Del Rey Books, edited Best Science Fiction Stories of the Year (1972–1976)
- Samuel R. Delany (born 1942), US, writer and critic, edited the anthology series Quark with Marilyn Hacker
- August Derleth (1909–1971), US, noted anthologist and founder of Arkham House
- T. E. Dikty (1920–1991), US, edited the first "Best of the Year" anthology series (1949–1957); founder, publisher & editor, Starmont Books
- Thomas M. Disch (1940–2008), US, edited various New Wave anthologies as Bad Moon Rising: An Anthology of Political Forebodings
- Tom Doherty (born 1935), US, founder and publisher of Tor Books
- Candas Jane Dorsey, (born 1952), Canada, editor/publisher, Tesseracts Books for a number of years
- John R. Douglas, US, editor for Pocket Books, Avon, and HarperCollins
- Gardner Dozois (1947–2018), US, premier "Best of the Year" anthologist; multiple award-winning editor of Isaac Asimov's Science Fiction Magazine (1984–2004)
- L. Timmel Duchamp, (born 1950), US, editor/publisher, Aqueduct Press, Seattle

== E ==
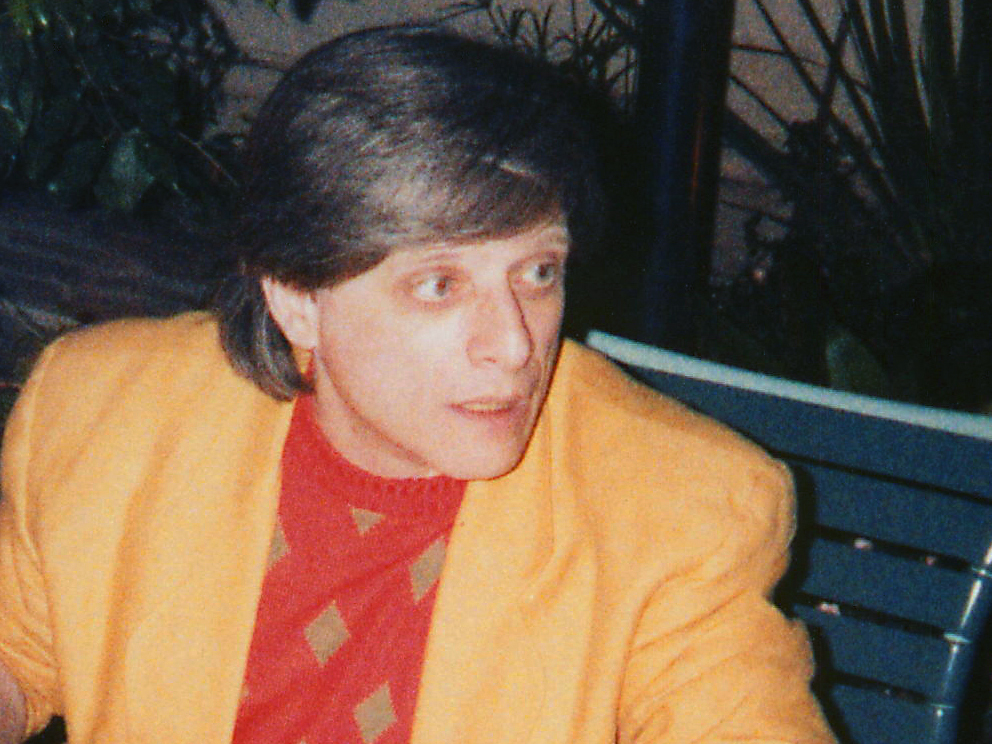
Harlan Ellison, 1986

- Claire Eddy, US, senior editor at Tor Books
- Malcolm Edwards (born 1949), UK, editor at Gollancz, HarperCollins and Orion Publishing Group
- Harlan Ellison (1934–2018), US, editor of the Dangerous Visions anthologies
- Roger Elwood (1943–2007), US, anthologist 1972–1975
- Andreas Eschbach (born 1959), Germany, editor of prize-winning anthology One Trillion Euro
- Lloyd Arthur Eshbach (1910–2003), US, founder & editor at Fantasy Press
- Richard Evans (1950–1996), UK, editor at Gollancz, McDonald Futura and Orbit Books

== F ==
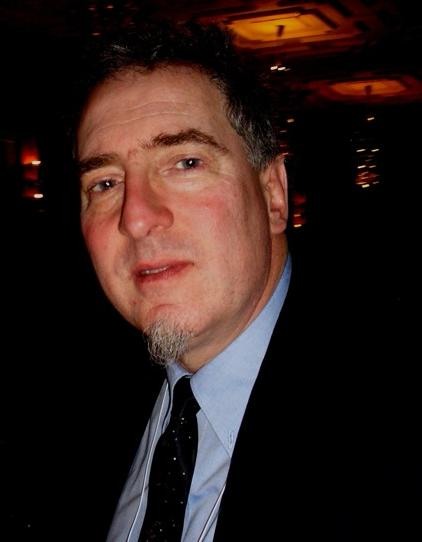
James Frenkel, 2005

- Paul W. Fairman (1916–1977), US, editor of Amazing Stories, If and Fantastic in the 1950s
- Moshe Feder, US, formerly editor at the Science Fiction Book Club and Tor Books, consulting editor for Tor
- Jenna Felice (1976–2001), US, editor at Tor Books
- Edward L. Ferman (born 1937), US, editor of the Magazine of Fantasy and Science Fiction (1964–1991)
- Joseph W. Ferman (1906–1974), US, founder, editor of The Magazine of Fantasy and Science Fiction
- Jo Fletcher formerly of Gollancz, now Jo Fletcher Books
- Eric Flint (born 1947), US, reissue editor at Baen Books, cofounder of Baen Free Library
- James Frenkel (born 1948), US, editor at Dell Books; founder and publisher of Bluejay Books; editor at Tor Books (1987–2013)
- Esther Friesner (born 1951), US, editor & anthologist of the Chicks in Chainmail original-anthology series
- Oscar J. Friend (1897–1963), US, anthologist

== G ==
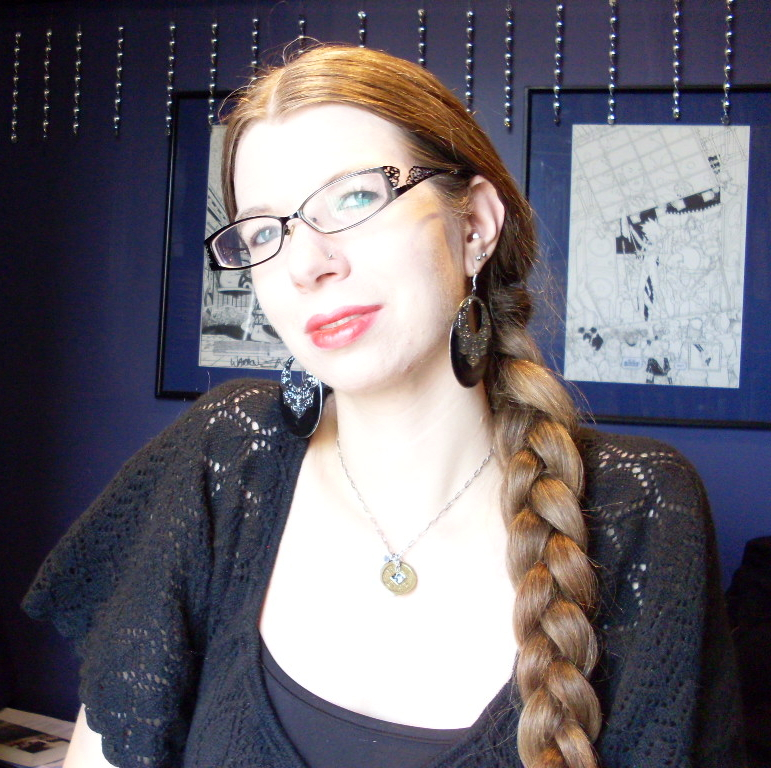
Liz Gorinsky, 2010

- David S. Garnett, (born 1947), UK, editor of the New Worlds, Orbit and Zenith anthology series
- Henry Gee, (born 1962), UK, editor of the Nature Futures series of science fiction short stories and the anthology of them
- Anna Genoese, US, editor for Tor Books; originated Tor's paranormal romance imprint
- Hugo Gernsback (1884–1967), US, (born Luxembourg), pioneer editor of Amazing Stories magazine
- Nick Gevers, (born 1965), UK, anthologist and editor for PS Publishing
- Vic Ghidalia, (born 1926), US, collaborated on anthologies with Roger Elwood
- Sheila Gilbert, US, longtime editor and co-owner of DAW Books
- Diana Gill, US, SF and fantasy editor at HarperCollins
- Laura Ann Gilman, (born 1967), US, freelance editor; formerly with Berkley, Dutton and New American Library
- Robert Gleason, US, longtime editor at Tor Books; formerly Tor's Editor-in-Chief
- H. L. Gold (1914–1996), US, (born Canada), founding editor of Galaxy magazine
- Stephen Goldin, (born 1947), US, anthologist and editor of the SFWA Bulletin
- Cele Goldsmith Lalli (1933–2002), US, editor of Amazing Stories and Fantastic magazines in the 1960s
- Liz Gorinsky, US, editor at Tor Books
- Charles L. Grant, (1942–2006), US, horror writer and anthologist
- Martin Greenberg (1918–2013), US, anthologist and founder of Gnome Press
- Martin H. Greenberg (1941–2011), US, prolific anthologist
- Anne Groell, US, senior editor at Bantam Spectra
- Eileen Gunn (born 1945), US, editor & publisher of the Infinite Matrix webzine
- James Gunn (born 1923), US, editor of The Road to Science Fiction series of teaching anthologies; professor emeritus of science fiction literature at the University of Kansas and director of the Center for the Study of Science Fiction

== H ==
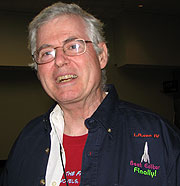
David G. Hartwell, 2007

- Karen Haber, (born 1955), US, critic, editor of "Best of the Year" collections (2001–2004)
- Marilyn Hacker, (born 1942), US, anthologist (with Samuel R. Delany)
- Ronald M. Hahn, born 1948, Germany, writer, translator, anthologist, editor of the German edition of The Magazine of Fantasy and Science Fiction and Nova.
- Gabrielle Harbowy, (born 1972), US, anthologist; managing editor at Dragon Moon Press; Copyeditor at Pyr
- Lee Harris, (born 1968), UK, Hugo-nominated senior editor at Angry Robot Books, Tor.com Publishing.
- Harry Harrison, (1925–2012), US, anthologist
- David G. Hartwell (1941–2016), US, anthologist; senior editor at Tor Books; editor at Signet, Berkley, and Pocket Books; co-founder and editor of The New York Review of Science Fiction
- Raymond J. Healey (1907–1969), US, with J. Francis McComas, edited the pioneer anthology Adventures in Time and Space (1946) and alone two original anthologies in early 1950s
- Douglas Hill (1935–2007), UK, editor at Aldus Books, literary editor of Tribune
- Tim Holman, UK, publishing director for Orbit Books worldwide; formerly editor at Orbit UK
- John-Henri Holmberg (born 1947), Sweden, editor, translator, critic
- Rachel E. Holmen, US, co-editor and art director for Marion Zimmer Bradley's Fantasy Magazine, managing editor at Locus magazine from 1979 to 1984
- Rich Horton, US, critic and editor for three "Years Best" anthology series.
- Stuart Hughes (editor) (born 1965), UK, publisher & editor Peeping Tom
- Mary-Theresa Hussey, US, executive editor, Luna Books, Harlequin's fantasy imprint

== I ==
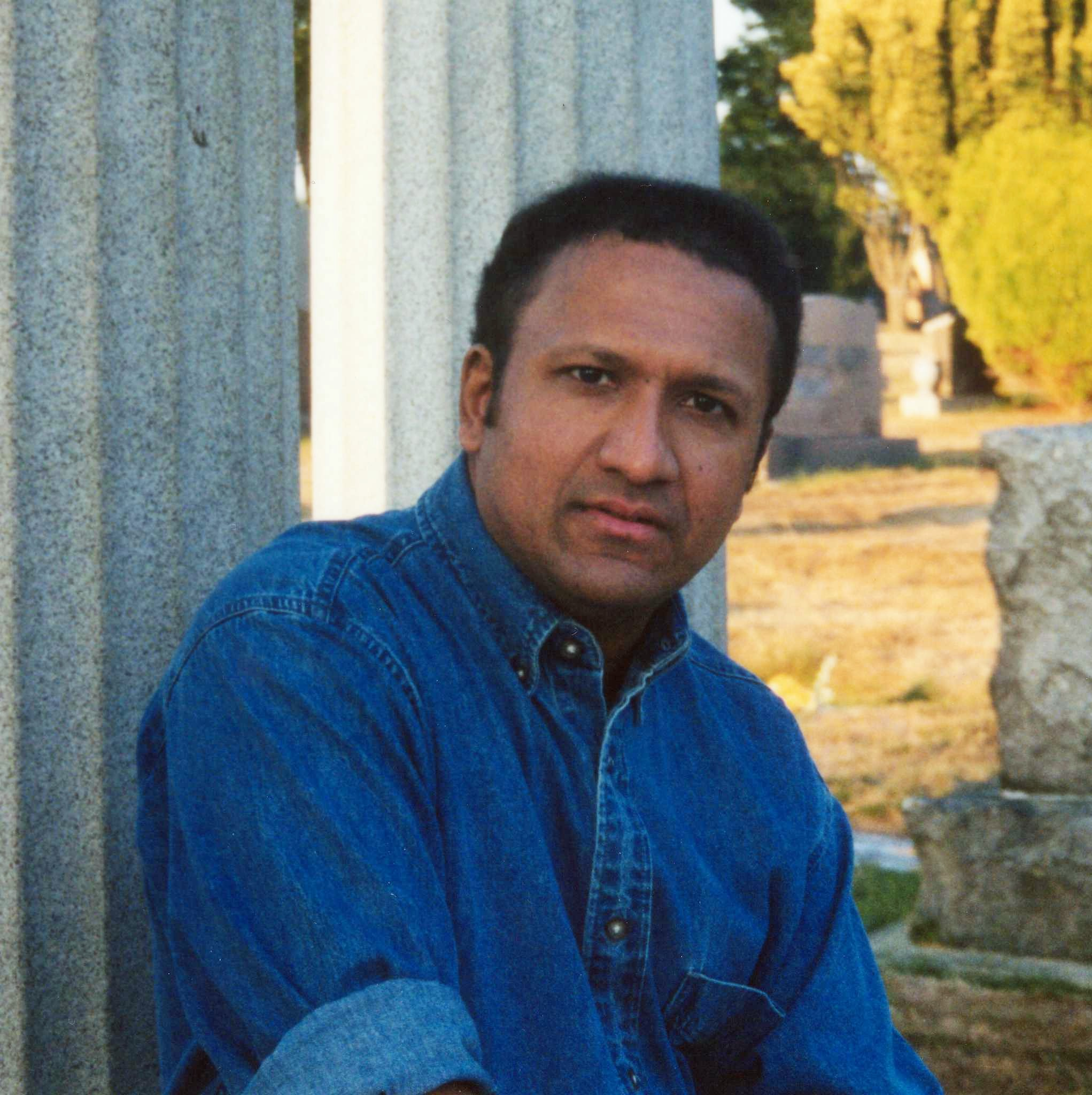
S. T. Joshi (2002)

- Van Ikin (born 1951), Australia, anthologist; editor of Science Fiction; English professor

== J ==
- Ejler Jakobsson (1911–1986), editor for a number of pulp magazines
- Anna Jackson, Orbit books
- Toni Jerrman (born 1964), editor of influential Finnish science fiction magazine Tähtivaeltaja
- Karl Johanson (born 1962 in Victoria, Canada), editor of Neo-opsis Science Fiction Magazine
- Jane Johnson (born 1960), HarperVoyager
- Oliver Johnson, Hodder & Stoughton
- Stephen Jones (born 1953), British horror anthologist
- S. T. Joshi (born 1958 in Pune, India), editor of many collections of short stories

== K ==
- Michael Kandel (born 1941), US, part-time editor at Harcourt; edits Ursula K. Le Guin's work
- Marvin Kaye (born 1938), US, horror anthologist, editor of H. P. Lovecraft's Magazine of Horror
- Gérard Klein, (born 1937) French book editor
- Damon Knight (1922–2002), US, editor of the Orbit series of original anthologies
- Jak Koke (born 1964), US, fantasy author and managing editor of Per Aspera Press
- Sean CW Korsgaard (born 1989), US, editor and author, Baen Books
- Edward E. Kramer (born 1961), US, anthologist and author
- Alisa Krasnostein, (born 1976), Australia, founder and managing editor of Twelfth Planet Press
- Péter Kuczka (1923–1999), noted Hungarian editor of Galaktika 1972–1995
- David Kyle (born 1919) co-founder of Gnome Press

== L ==
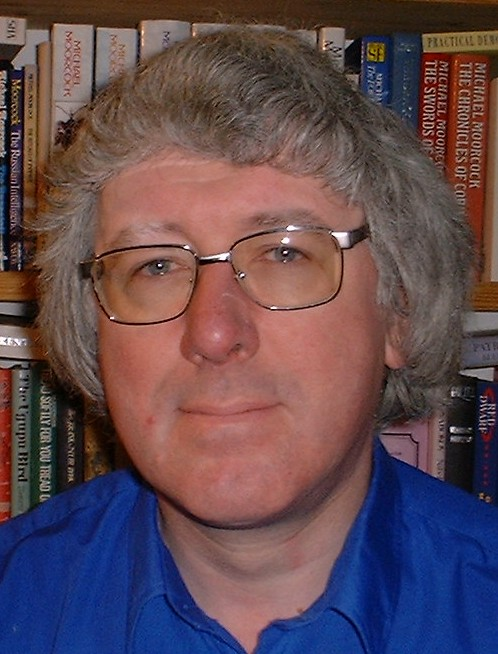
David Langford

- David Langford (born 1953), UK editor of collections by John Sladek, editor of The Encyclopedia of Science Fiction 3rd Edition.
- Joel Lane (1963–2013), UK author and editor of several crime and fantasy collections for small press imprints
- Warren Lapine (born 1964), US, editor and publisher of Absolute Magnitude and DNA Publications
- Denise Little, editor of fantasy anthologies with Martin H. Greenberg
- Pat LoBrutto (born 1948), US, consulting editor for Tor Books, formerly with Bantam Books and Ace Books
- Robert A. W. Lowndes (1916–1998), US, editor of Future Science Fiction, Science Fiction, and Science Fiction Quarterly
- Richard A. Lupoff (1935–2020) US, anthologist

== M ==
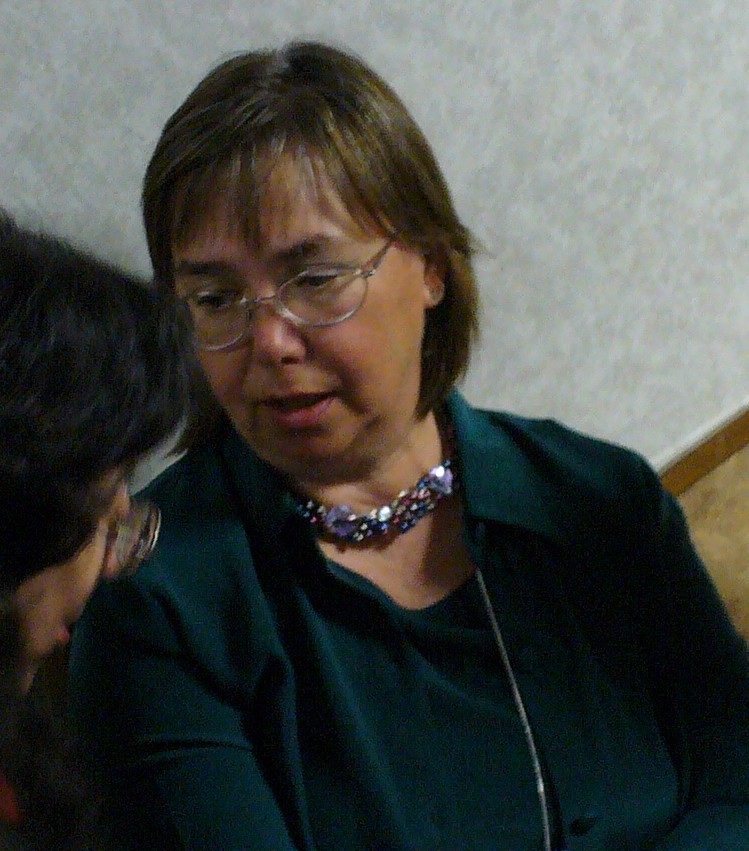
Beth Meacham

- Daryl F. Mallett (born 1969), US, editor at Borgo Press (1989–1999); editor of SFRA Review #203-211 (1993–1994); editorial board of Extrapolation (1994-????); managing editor at Chaos! Comics (1995); associate editor of Other Worlds (1995-????)
- Barry N. Malzberg (born 1939), US, magazine editor, anthologist
- Nick Mamatas (born 1972), editor of Clarkesworld Magazine; editor of Haikasoru imprint of Japanese SF in translation
- Leo Margulies (1900–1975), US, anthologist, editor of Thrilling Wonder Stories, Captain Future, Startling Stories, and many other pulp magazines
- Shawna McCarthy (born 1954), US, anthologist, editor of Realms of Fantasy; editor of Isaac Asimov's Science Fiction Magazine (1983–86)
- J. Francis McComas (1910–1978), US, co-founding editor of The Magazine of Fantasy & Science Fiction; anthologist
- Harriet McDougal (born 1939), US, former editor-in-chief of Tor Books, former Editorial Director of Ace Books; wife of author Robert Jordan.
- Beth Meacham (born 1951), US, senior editor at Tor Books, 1984–present; editor at Ace Books 1981–1984
- Judith Merril (1923–1997), Canada (born US), edited "Year's Best" anthologies, (1956–67)
- Sam Merwin, Jr. (1910–1996), US, editor of Fantastic Universe and Galaxy
- Robert P. Mills (1920–1986), US, magazine editor
- Samuel Mines (1909–1986), US, editor of Startling Stories and Thrilling Wonder Stories in the 1950s
- Jim Minz, US, editor at Baen Books, former editor at Tor Books and Del Rey Books
- Betsy Mitchell (editor), US, editor-in-chief of Del Rey Books; former editor at Baen Books, Bantam Books, and Warner Aspect
- Michael Moorcock (born 1939), UK (lives in US), editor of New Worlds magazine in the 1960s
- James Morrow (born 1947), US, anthologist, editor of The SFWA European Hall of Fame

== N ==
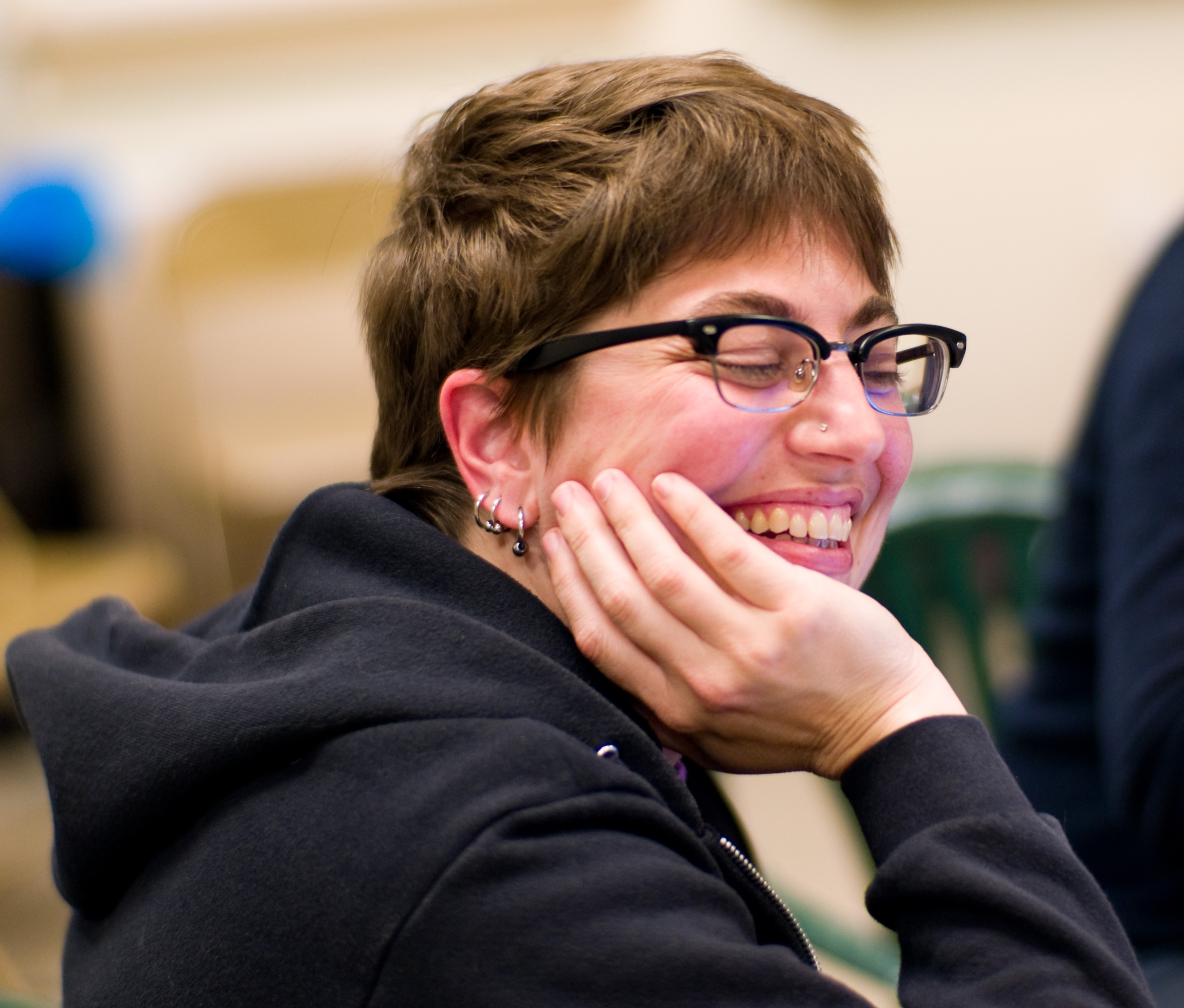
Annalee Newitz, 2008

- Darren Nash, UK (born Australia), editor for Orbit Books UK, formerly with Simon & Schuster UK
- Gabriella Nemeth, UK, editor for Atom Books division of Little, Brown)
- Annalee Newitz (born 1969), editor in chief, io9
- Patrick Nielsen Hayden (born 1959), US, manager of science fiction at Tor Books; editor of Starlight original anthology series
- Teresa Nielsen Hayden (born 1956), US, consulting editor (former managing editor) for Tor Books
- Raimo Nikkonen, Finland, editor of major Finnish Science fiction magazine Portti
- Kate Nintzel, acquisitions editor at Eos books (HarperCollins)
- Scot Noel, US, editor in chief of Dreamforge (Dreamforge)
- Sharyn November, US, senior editor of Viking Children's Books and editorial director of Firebird Books

== O ==
- John O'Neill, founder of SF Site and editor of Black Gate
- John Oakes, former editor and publisher for Thunder's Mouth Press and Four Walls Eight Windows
- Andrew J. Offutt (1934–2013), anthologist
- Jonathan Oliver (publishing), Solaris and Abaddon
- John J. Ordover, former editor at Pocket Books, responsible for Star Trek novelizations, now at Phobos Books

== P ==
- Bella Pagan, previously editor for Orbit Books UK, now Tor UK
- Raymond A. Palmer (1910–1977), US, influential editor of Amazing Stories, 1938–1949
- Anne C. Perry, Hodder & Stoughton
- Rog Peyton (born 1942), UK, Birmingham bookseller who launched the Drunken Dragon imprint and co-edited (with Rod Milner) the Venture SF reprint series
- John J. Pierce (born 1941), US, editor of Galaxy Science Fiction, 1977–1979
- Devi Pillai, Tor Books
- Frederik Pohl (1919–2013), US, writer, edited Galaxy and If magazines in 1960s and the Star Science Fiction series of original anthologies (1953–1959)
- Andrew I. Porter, (born 1946), US, editor of Science Fiction Chronicle for many years
- Byron Preiss (1952–2005), American editor, anthologist and publisher of Byron Preiss Visual Publications
- David Pringle (born 1950), Scottish editor and publisher of Interzone 1988–2004
- Bill Pronzini (born 1943), American anthologist, often with Barry N. Malzberg and/or Martin H. Greenberg

== Q ==
- James L. Quinn, editor of If in the 1950s

== R ==
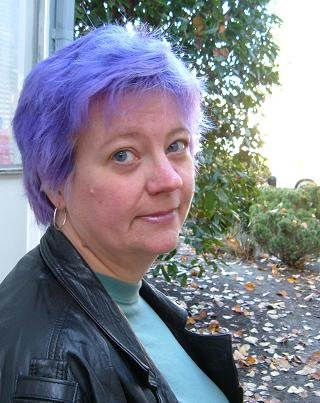
Cat Rambo

- Eric Raab, editor, Tor Books
- Cat Rambo (born 1963), co-editor, Fantasy Magazine
- Gillian Redfearn, Gollancz
- Mike Resnick (1942–2020), US, anthologist
- Lezli Robyn, Co-editor Heart's Kiss magazine (2017–2018), editor Galaxy's Edge magazine (2020-), anthologist
- Christopher Ruocchio, editor at Baen Books
- Kristine Kathryn Rusch (born 1960), US, editor of Pulphouse and The Magazine of Fantasy & Science Fiction (1991–97)

== S ==
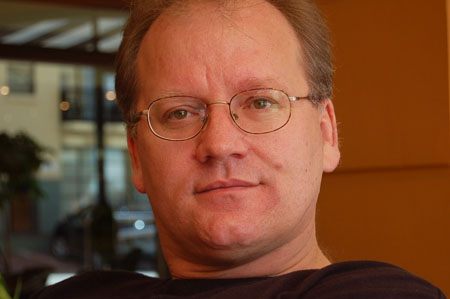
Jonathan Strahan

- Steve Saffel, US, freelance editor, formerly at Del Rey Books and Marvel Comics
- Arthur W. Saha (1923–1999), US anthologist closely associated with Donald A. Wollheim
- Pamela Sargent, edited Women of Wonder series and Nebula Awards Showcase (1995-97)
- Robert J. Sawyer, Canada, editor of the Robert J. Sawyer Books imprint of Red Deer Press, a division of Fitzhenry & Whiteside, as well as several anthologies
- Karl-Herbert Scheer (1928–1991), Germany, shared editorial direction of the Perry Rhodan series with Walter Ernsting
- Liz Scheier, editor formerly for Roc and Del Rey
- Christopher Schelling, US, literary agent, former editor for Roc Books and HarperPrism
- Chris Schluep, US, editor at Del Rey Books
- Bryan Thomas Schmidt (born 1969), American science fiction author and editor
- Stanley Schmidt (born 1944), US, award-winning editor of Analog Science Fiction and Fact since 1977
- George H. Scithers (1929–2010), US, first editor of Isaac Asimov's Science Fiction Magazine 1976–1981; editor Amazing Stories, mid-1980s
- Shelly Shapiro, US, acquisitions editor, Ballantine Del Rey
- Larry Shaw (1924–1985), editor of Infinity Science Fiction, If magazine and Lancer Books
- Mike Shohl, freelance editor, formerly with HarperCollins
- John Silbersack, US, literary agent, Trident Media Group. Former publishing director or editor at HarperCollins, Warner Books, Roc and Berkley
- Steven H Silver (born 1967), American anthologist with Martin H. Greenberg; critic; editor at ISFiC Press
- Robert Silverberg (born 1935), important American writer and editor of original anthologies and a "The Best of" line from 2001 to 2002.
- Janna Silverstein, US, acquisitions editor, Spectra from 1985 to 1994; editor, Kobold Press from 2008–present; critic and reviewer.
- Melissa Ann Singer, US, editor, Tor/Forge; primarily known as a horror editor
- Jason Sizemore, American founder and former editor of Apex Digest, anthologist, managing editor of Apex Publications
- T. O'Conor Sloane (1851–1940), US, editor of Amazing Stories (1929–1938)
- George Edgar Slusser, (1938–2014), US, editor of Eaton anthologies of SF studies
- Anne Sowards, US, acquisitions editor, Roc Books and Ace Books
- Simon Spanton, UK, co-editorial director of Orion Gollancz, UK
- Catriona Sparks (born 1965), Australia, founding editor of Agog! Press
- Lou Stathis (1952–1997), editor of Heavy Metal magazine and of DC Comics' Vertigo line
- Paul Stevens, US, editor at Tor/Forge Books
- Amy Stout, US, editor at Bantam Spectra, consulting editor to Ballantine/Del Rey, author.
- Jonathan Strahan (born 1964 Northern Ireland), Australia, anthologist, editor, publisher and critic

== T ==
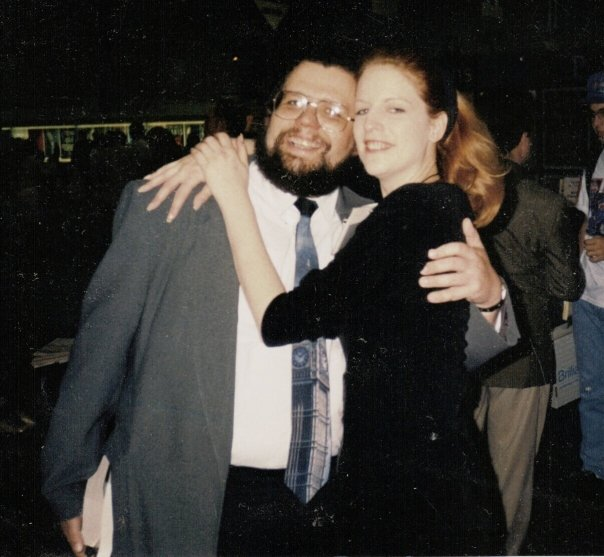
Brian Thomsen (left)

- Lynne M. Thomas, US, editor of Apex Digest, Chicks Dig...
- Richard Thomas, US, editor of Gamut Magazine and Dark House Press
- Sheree Thomas, US, editor of the Dark Matter anthologies and (since 2020) of The Magazine of Fantasy & Science Fiction
- Brian Thomsen (1959–2008), US, consulting editor for Tor Books, former editor for DAW Books and Warner Books
- Roy Torgeson, editor of Other Worlds and Chrysalis anthology series, 1977–1983
- F. Orlin Tremaine (1899–1956), US, editor of Astounding Science Fiction 1933–1937
- Liza Groen Trombi, US, editor and publisher, Locus Publications
- Gary Turner, US, editor and publisher, Golden Gryphon Press

== U ==
- Juliet Ulman, Formerly senior editor for Bantam Spectra, now editor-in-chief for Pugilist Press, an independent publisher of literary fiction.

== V ==
- Gordon Van Gelder (born 1966), US, editor (1997-2015) and publisher (since 2000) of The Magazine of Fantasy & Science Fiction; editor at St. Martin's Press, 1988–2000
- Ann VanderMeer, US, editor of Weird Tales; anthologist; founder of Buzzcity Press.
- Jeff VanderMeer (born 1968), US writer, anthologist; founding editor and publisher of the Ministry of Whimsy Press (now defunct)

== W ==
Sheila Williams, 2020

- Sean Wallace (born 1976), US, editor and publisher at Prime Books, Cosmos Books, and other small press publishers
- Toni Weisskopf (born 1965), US, publisher of Baen Books after Baen's death; executive editor since 1987
- Peter Weston (1943–2017), UK, published the literary journal Speculation (launched as Zenith in 1963) and later edited the Andromeda original anthologies (1975–77)
- Ted White (born 1938), US, former editor of Fantastic, Amazing Stories and Heavy Metal; anthologist
- Paul Williams (1948–2013), US, editor of the complete short fiction of Philip K. Dick and Theodore Sturgeon
- Sheila Williams (born 1956), US, editor Asimov's Science Fiction since 2004; managing editor and assistant editor, 1982–2004
- Terri Windling (born 1958), US, editor at Ace Books (1980–1985); consulting editor for Tor Books since 1986; award-winning anthologist; editor of The Journal of Mythic Arts since 1996
- Betsy Wollheim (born 1951), US, publisher and co-owner of DAW Books; daughter of Donald A. Wollheim
- Donald A. Wollheim (1914–1990), US, influential SF editor at Ace Books 1950–60s, founded DAW Books in 1971

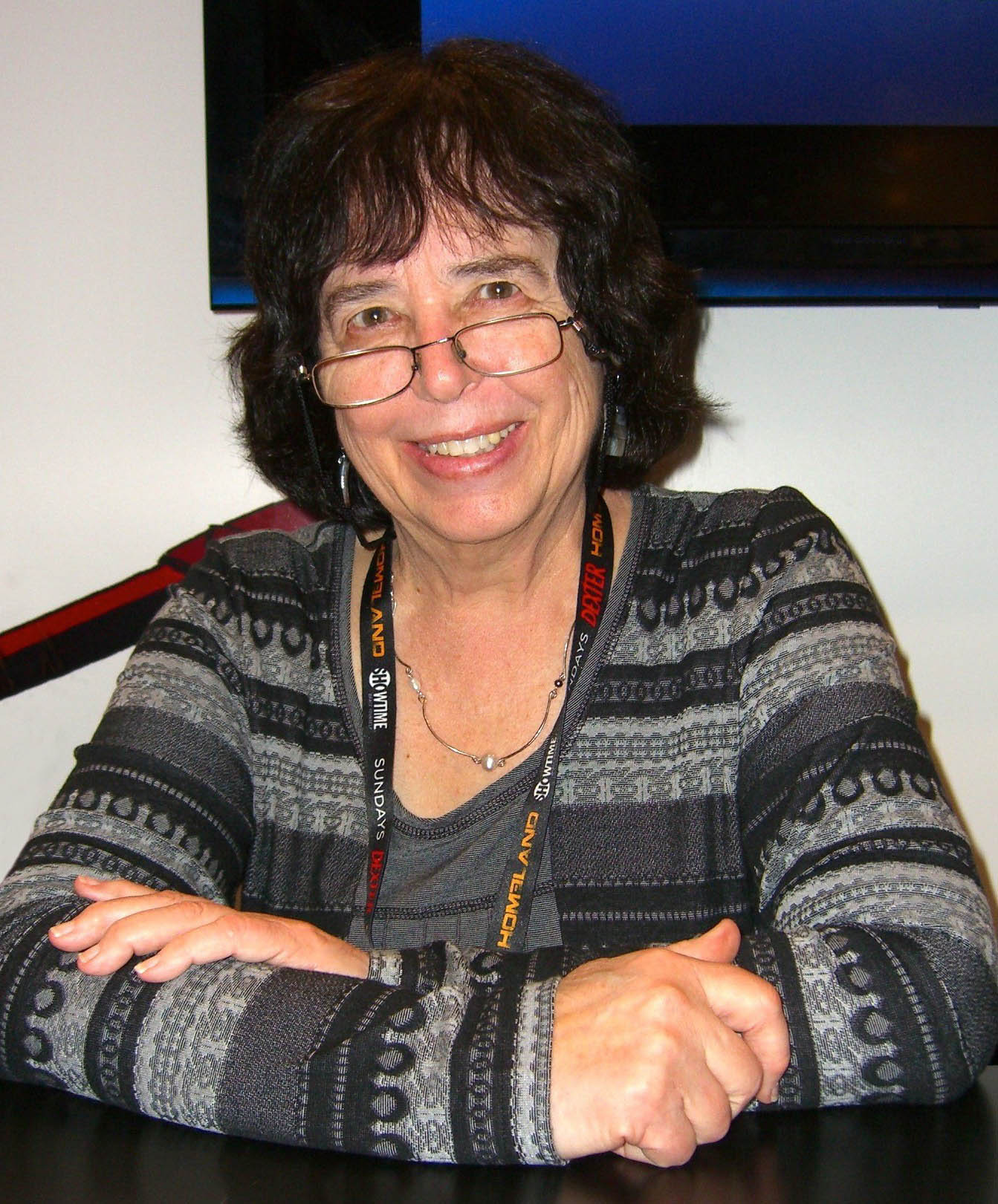
Jane Yolen

- Jane Yolen (born 1939), prolific children's writer, editor of "Jane Yolen Books" at Harcourt Brace; fantasy anthology series Xanadu (1992–1994), Year's Best Science Fiction and Fantasy for Teens
- Brian Youmans, editor, Best of the Rest small press anthology series
- Angela Yuriko Smith, editor in chief, Space and Time Magazine

== See also ==
- Editing
- Futurians
- List of fantasy authors
- List of horror fiction authors
- List of science fiction authors
- Science fiction fandom
