= ArmadilloCon =

- Status: Active
- Genre: Science fiction
- Venue: Austin Southpark Hotel
- Location: Austin, Texas
- Country: United States
- Inaugurated: 1979
- Attendance: 400
- Organizer: Fandom Association of Central Texas
- Filing status: 501(c)(3)
- Website: armadillocon.org

ArmadilloCon is a science fiction convention held annually in Austin, Texas, USA, since 1979. As the second longest running science fiction convention in Texas, it is sponsored by the Fandom Association of Central Texas and is known for its emphasis on literary science fiction. ArmadilloCon was originally held in mid-October during the weekend of the Texas-OU football game, but moved to a late-summer/early-fall weekend in 1998.

== Traditions of ArmadilloCon ==
ArmadilloCon generally focuses on literary science-fiction, with guests of honor typically being up-and-coming writers. Unique programming includes a "Fannish Feud" which has been held regularly since ArmadilloCon 4 in 1982, and has been hosted by a variety of people, including Pat Cadigan, Walter Jon Williams, and Professor Griffin. The convention typically includes a large number of readings, and for some years ended with a story reading by Howard Waldrop.

A key element of the convention is the ArmadilloCon Writers' Workshop. The workshop was started in 1998, instigated by Chairs A.T. Campbell III and Lori Wolf. The workshop is held during the day on the Friday of the convention, with a Writers' Track of sessions available during the rest of the weekend.

== Past conventions ==
ArmadilloCon 1 program book

- ArmadilloCon 1 (May 11–13, 1979)
  - Chair: Willie Siros
  - Guest of Honor: John Varley
  - Fan Guest: Jeanne Gomoll
  - Toastmaster: Howard Waldrop
  - Location: Villa Capri
- ArmadilloCon 2 (October 3–5, 1980)
  - Chair: Willie Siros
  - Guest of Honor: Gardner Dozois
  - Fan Guest: Harry O. Morris
  - Toastmaster: Chad Oliver
- ArmadilloCon 3 (October 1981)
  - Chair: Willie Siros
  - Guest of Honor: Chad Oliver
  - Fan Guest: Bob Wayne
  - Toastmaster: Ed Bryant
  - Location: Ramada Riverside
- ArmadilloCon 4 (October 1–3, 1982)
  - Chair: Ed Scarbrough
  - Guests of Honor: George Alec Effinger and George R. R. Martin
  - Fan Guest: Joe Pumilia
  - Toastmaster: Ed Bryant
- ArmadilloCon 5 (October 7–9, 1983)
  - Chair: Ed Scarborough
  - Guest of Honor: Howard Waldrop
  - Fan Guest: Becky Matthews
  - Toastmaster: Neal Barrett, Jr.
  - Location: Villa Capri Motor Hotel
- ArmadilloCon 6 (October 5–7, 1984)
  - Chair: Ed Scarborough
  - Guest of Honor: John Sladek
  - Fan Guests: James A. Corrick and Gay Miller Corrick
  - Toastmaster: Joe R. Lansdale
  - Special Guest: Ellen Datlow
- ArmadilloCon 7 (1985)
  - Relaxacon after the third occasional North American Science Fiction Convention, dubbed "LoneStarCon 1", was held in Austin.
- ArmadilloCon 8 (October 10–12, 1986)
  - Chair: Robert Taylor
  - Guest of Honor: William Gibson
  - Editor Guest: Ellen Datlow
  - Fan Guest: Debbie Notkin
  - Toastmaster: Lewis Shiner
- ArmadilloCon 9 (October 9–11, 1987)
  - Chair: Fred Duarte, Jr.
  - Guest of Honor: Bruce Sterling
  - Artist Guest: J. R. Daniels
  - Editor Guest: Beth Meacham
  - Fan Guest: Mark Olson
  - Toastmaster: Pat Cadigan
- ArmadilloCon 10 (October 7–9, 1988)
  - Chairs: Fred Duarte, Jr. and Karen Meschke
  - Guest of Honor: K. W. Jeter
  - Artist Guest: Brad W. Foster
  - Editor Guest: Ginjer Buchanan
  - Fan Guests: Jane Dennis and Scott Dennis
  - Toastmaster: Lewis Shiner
  - Location: Wyndham Southpark
- ArmadilloCon 11 (October 13–15, 1989)
  - Chair: Karen Meschke
  - Guest of Honor: Lewis Shiner
  - Artist Guest: Don Ivan Punchatz
  - Editor Guest: Pat LoBrutto
  - Fan Guest: Mike Glyer
  - Toastmaster: Connie Willis
  - Special Guests: William Gibson and Tom Maddox (sponsored by MCC)
  - Location: Wyndham Southpark
- ArmadilloCon 12 (October 12–14, 1990)
  - Chair: Ed Graham
  - Guest of Honor: Pat Cadigan
  - Artist Guest: Jean Elizabeth Martin (JEM)
  - Editor Guest: Susan Allison
  - Fan Guest: Debbie Hodgkinson
  - Toastmaster: Melinda M. Snodgrass
  - Special Guests: Vernor Vinge and Marc Stiegler (sponsored by MCC)
  - Location: Wyndham Southpark
- ArmadilloCon 13 (October 11–13, 1991)
  - Chair: Casey Hamilton
  - Guest of Honor: Dan Simmons
  - Artist Guest: Dell Harris
  - Editor Guest: Amy Stout
  - Fan Guest: Pat Mueller (Pat Virzi)
  - Toastmistress: Emma Bull
  - Location: Wyndham Southpark
- ArmadilloCon 14 (October 9–11, 1992)
  - Chairs: Lori Wolf and Fred Duarte, Jr.
  - Guest of Honor: Neal Barrett, Jr.
  - Artist Guest: Darrell K. Sweet
  - Editor Guest: Gardner Dozois
  - Fan Guest: Allan Jackson
  - Toastmaster: Kim Stanley Robinson
  - Location: Wyndham Southpark
- ArmadilloCon 15 (November 5–7, 1993)
  - Chairs: Willie Siros and Lori Wolf
  - Guest of Honor: Gwyneth Jones (novelist)
  - Artist Guest: Harry O. Morris
  - Editor Guest: John Douglas
  - Toastmaster: Michael Bishop (author)
  - Location: Red Lion
- ArmadilloCon 16 (October 7–9, 1994)
  - Chairs: Ed Graham and Casey Hamilton
  - Guest of Honor: Elizabeth Moon
  - Artist Guest: David A. Cherry
  - Editor Guest: Gordon Van Gelder
  - Fan Guest: Gregory Benford
  - Toastmaster: Bradley Denton
  - Special Guest: Guy Gavriel Kay
  - Location: Red Lion
- ArmadilloCon 17 (October 6–8, 1995)
  - Chairs: Fred Duarte, Jr. and Dan Tolliver
  - Guest of Honor: Alexander Jablokov
  - Artist Guest: Vincent Di Fate
  - Editor Guest: John Silbersack
  - Fan Guests: Dick Smith and Leah Zeldes Smith
  - Toastmaster: Terry Bisson
  - Location: Red Lion
- ArmadilloCon 18 (October 11–13, 1996)
  - Chair: Dan Tolliver
  - Guest of Honor: Jonathan Lethem
  - Artist Guest: Bob Eggleton
  - Editor Guest: Patrick Nielsen Hayden
  - Fan Guests: Spike Parsons and Tom Becker
  - Toastmaster: Mike Resnick
  - Location: Red Lion
- ArmadilloCon 19 (1997)
  - Relaxacon after the 55th World Science Fiction Convention, dubbed "LoneStarCon 2", was held in San Antonio.
  - Chair: John Gibbons
  - Guest of Honor: Mary Rosenblum
  - Location: Hunt, Texas
- ArmadilloCon 20 (August 28–30, 1998)
  - Chairs: A. T. Campbell, III and Lori Wolf
  - Guest of Honor: Bradley Denton
  - Artist Guest: Mitchell Bentley
  - Editor Guest: David G. Hartwell
  - Fan Guest: Peggy Ranson
  - Toastmaster: Steven Gould
  - Special Guest: Peter F. Hamilton (sponsored by ALAMO, Inc.)
  - Location: Omni Southpark Hotel
- ArmadilloCon 21 (September 10–12, 1999)
  - Chairs: Mona Gamboa and John Gibbons
  - Guest of Honor: Sean Stewart
  - Artist Guest: Wayne Barlowe
  - Editor Guest: Shawna McCarthy
  - Fan Guest: Harry Stubbs
  - Toastmaster: William Browning Spencer
  - Special Guest: Neil Gaiman (sponsored by ALAMO, Inc.)
  - Location: Omni Southpark Hotel
- ArmadilloCon 22 (August 18–20, 2000)
  - Chairs: John Gibbons and Dan Tolliver
  - Guest of Honor: Catherine Asaro
  - Artist Guest: Adam "Mojo" Lebowitz
  - Editor Guest: Betsy Mitchell
  - Fan Guest: Robert Taylor
  - Toastmaster: Mary Doria Russell
  - Special Guest: Kathleen Ann Goonan (sponsored by ALAMO, Inc.)
  - Location: Omni Southpark Hotel
- ArmadilloCon 23 (November 16–18, 2001)
  - Chairs: Renee Babcock and Lori Wolf
  - Guest of Honor: J. Gregory Keyes
  - Artist Guest: John Jude Palencar
  - Editor Guest: Toni Weisskopf
  - Fan Guest: Teddy Harvia
  - Toastmaster: Walter Jon Williams
  - Special Guest: Esther Friesner (sponsored by ALAMO, Inc.)
  - Location: Austin Hilton North
- ArmadilloCon 24 (August 16–18, 2002)
  - Chairs: Renee Babcock and Charles Siros
  - Guest of Honor: Martha Wells
  - Artist Guests: Frank Cho and Scott Kurtz
  - Editor Guest: Tom Doherty
  - Fan Guests: Kurt Baty and Scott Bobo
  - Toastmaster: Joe R. Lansdale
  - Special Guest: Robin Hobb (sponsored by ALAMO, Inc.)
  - Location:Omni Southpark Hotel
- ArmadilloCon 25 (August 8–10, 2003)
  - Chair: John Gibbons
  - Guest of Honor: Kage Baker
  - Fan Guest: Willie Siros
  - Toastmaster: Aaron Allston
  - Editor Guest: Anne Groell
  - Artist Guest: John Picacio
  - Special Guest: Vernor Vinge
  - Location: Austin Hilton North
- ArmadilloCon 26 (August 13–15, 2004)
  - Chairs: Kimm Antell and Chuck Siros
  - Guest of Honor: Sharon Shinn
  - Fan Guest: Chaz "Hazel" Boston Baden
  - Toastmaster: K. D. Wentworth
  - Editor Guest: Stanley Schmidt
  - Artist Guest: Charles Vess
  - Mystery Guests of Honor: Charlaine Harris & Barbara Hambly (sponsored by ALAMO, Inc.)
  - Location: Austin Hilton North
- ArmadilloCon 27 (August 19–21, 2005)
  - Chairs: Renee Babcock and John Gibbons
  - Guest of Honor: Charles Stross
  - Fan Guests: Jim Mann & Laurie Mann
  - Toastmaster: Charles de Lint
  - Editor Guest: Jim Minz
  - Artist Guest: Ctein
  - Special Guest: Sean McMullen (sponsored by ALAMO, Inc.)
  - Location: Doubletree Hotel Austin
- ArmadilloCon 28 (August 11–13, 2006)
  - Chair: Kimm Antell
  - Guest of Honor: Julie E. Czerneda
  - Fan Guest: Grant Kruger
  - Toastmaster: Esther Friesner
  - Editor Guest: Diana Gill
  - Artist Guest: Ellisa Mitchell
  - Special Guest: James P. Hogan
  - Location: Doubletree Hotel Austin
- ArmadilloCon 29 (August 10–12, 2007)
  - Chair: Renee Babcock
  - Guest of Honor: Louise Marley
  - Fan Guest: Patty Wells
  - Toastmaster: Howard Waldrop
  - Editor Guest: Sharyn November
  - Artist Guest: Gary Lippincott
  - Location: Doubletree Hotel Austin
- ArmadilloCon 30 (August 15–17, 2008)
  - Chairs: Kurt Baty and Chuck Siros
  - Guest of Honor: John Scalzi
  - Artist Guest: David Lee Anderson
  - Fan Guest: Kelly Persons
  - Toastmaster: Bill Crider
  - Editor Guest: Sheila Williams
  - Special Guests: Gay Haldeman and Joe Haldeman
  - Location: Doubletree Hotel Austin
- ArmadilloCon 31 (August 14–16, 2009)
  - Chair: Kimm Antell
  - Guest of Honor: Scott Lynch
  - Artist Guest: ~~Stephan Martinière~~ (cancelled)
  - Editor Guest: Chris Roberson
  - Fan Guest: Karen Meschke
  - Toastmaster: Scott A. Cupp
  - Special Guest: Joan D. Vinge
  - Location: Doubletree Hotel Austin
- ArmadilloCon 32 (August 27–29, 2010)
  - Chairs: Elizabeth Burton and Dan Tolliver
  - Guest of Honor: Rachel Caine
  - Artist Guest: R. Cat Conrad
  - Editor Guest: Anne Sowards
  - Fan Guest: Elspeth Bloodgood
  - Toastmaster: Nancy Kress
  - Urban Fantasy Special Guest: Ilona Andrews
  - Steampunk Special Guest: Michael Bishop
  - Location: Renaissance Hotel Austin
- ArmadilloCon 33 (August 26–28, 2011)
  - Chairs: Jennifer Juday and Charles Siros
  - Guest of Honor: Paolo Bacigalupi
  - Artist Guest: Vincent Villafranca
  - Editor Guest: Lou Anders
  - Fan Guest: Fred Duarte, Jr.
  - Toastmaster: Mark Finn
  - Special Guests: Emma Bull and Will Shetterly
  - Location: Renaissance Hotel Austin
- ArmadilloCon 34 (July 27–29, 2012)
  - Chair: Sara Felix
  - Guest of Honor: Anne Bishop
  - Fan Guest: Bill Parker
  - Editor Guest: Liz Gorinsky
  - Special Guest: Chloe Neill
  - Artist Guest: Julie Dillon
  - Toastmaster: A. Lee Martinez
  - Location: Renaissance Hotel Austin
- ArmadilloCon 35 / GlyptoCon 3 (October 25–27, 2013)
  - Relaxacon after the 71st World Science Fiction Convention, dubbed "LoneStarCon 3", was held in San Antonio.
  - Chair: Willie Siros
  - Location: Canyon Lake, Texas
- ArmadilloCon 36 (July 25–27, 2014)
  - Chair: Kimm Antell
  - Guest of Honor: Ted Chiang
  - Fan Guest: Michael Walsh
  - Editor Guest: Jacob Weisman
  - Artist Guest: Stephanie Pui-Mun Law
  - Science Guest: Sigrid Close
  - Special Guest: Ian McDonald
  - Toastmaster: Mario Acevedo
  - Location: Omni Southpark Hotel
- ArmadilloCon 37 (July 24–26, 2015)
  - Chairs: Jennifer Juday & Charles Siros
  - Guest of Honor: Ken Liu
  - Special Guest: James Morrow
  - Fan Guest: John DeNardo (SF Signal)
  - Editor Guest: L. Timmel Duchamp
  - Artist Guest: Rocky Kelley
  - Toastmaster: Stina Leicht
  - Location: Omni Southpark Hotel
- ArmadilloCon 38 (July 29–31, 2016)
  - Chair: Charles Siros
  - Guest of Honor: Wesley Chu
  - Fan Guest: Ken Keller
  - Editor Guest: Joe Monti
  - Artist Guest: Christina Hess
  - Special Guest: Dominick Saponaro
  - Toastmaster: Joe McKinney (author)
  - Location: Omni Southpark Hotel
- ArmadilloCon 39 (August 4–6, 2017)
  - Chair: John Gibbons
  - Guest of Honor: Nisi Shawl
  - Special Guest: Tamora Pierce
  - Artist Guest Mark A. Nelson
  - Fan Guest: A.T. Campbell, III
  - Toastmaster: Don Webb
  - Location: Omni Southpark Hotel
- ArmadilloCon 40 (August 3–5, 2018)
  - Chair: Jennifer Juday
  - Guest of Honor: Deji Bryce Olukotun
  - Special Guest: Holly Black
  - Special Guest: Robert J. Sawyer
  - Artist Guest: Rosemary Valero-O'Connell
  - Fan Guest: Craig W. Chrissinger
  - Toastmaster: Aaron de Orive
  - Location: Omni Southpark Hotel
- ArmadilloCon 41 (August 2–4, 2019)
  - Chairs: Jennifer Juday and Charles Siros
  - Guest of Honor: Rebecca Roanhorse
  - Toastmaster: Marshall Ryan Maresca
  - Fan Guest: Dan Tolliver
  - Editor Guest: Patrice Caldwell
  - Science Guest: Moriba K. Jah, Ph.D.
  - Special Guest: Martha Wells
  - Location: Omni Southpark Hotel
- ArmadilloCon 42 (August 28–30, 2020)
  - Small virtual replacement for in-person event, due to COVID-19/SARS-CoV-2
  - Chair: Jennifer Juday
  - Special Guest: Tobias S. Buckell
  - Featured Writer: Cadwell Turnbull
  - Featured Writer: Libia Brenda
  - Artist Guest: Priscilla Kim
  - Fan Guests: Clif & Margaret Davis
  - Location: Virtual
- ArmadilloCon 43 (October 15–17, 2021)
  - Chair: Jonathan Miles
  - Guest of Honor: Nicky Drayden
  - Special Guest: David Liss
  - Special Guest: Marshall Ryan Maresca
  - Artist Guest: Gary Villarreal
- ArmadilloCon 44 (August 5–7, 2022)
  - Chair: Jennifer Juday
  - Writer Guest: Darcie Little Badger
  - Special Guest: Fonda Lee
  - Special Guest: Ellen Klages
  - Toastmaster: Cass Morris
  - Artist Guest: Lauren Raye Snow
  - Location: Austin Southpark Hotel
- ArmadilloCon 45 (August 4-6, 2023)
  - Chair: Jennifer Juday
  - Writer Guest: Sequoia Nagamatsu
  - Special Guest: Cory Doctorow
  - Special Guest: Gabino Iglesias
  - Toastmaster: Tonia Ransom
  - Artist Guest: Gonzalo Alvarez
  - Editor Guest: Rick Klaw
  - Fan Guest: Charles Siros
  - Location: Austin Southpark Hotel
- ArmadilloCon 46 (September 6-8, 2024)
  - Chair: Jennifer Juday
  - Writer Guest: Andrea Stewart
  - Special Guest: Delilah S. Dawson
  - Special Guest: Austin Grossman
  - Editor Guest: Arthur A. Levine
  - Artist Guests: The Shiflett Brothers
  - Toastmaster: D.L. Young
  - Location: Austin Southpark Hotel
- ArmadilloCon 47 (September 12-14, 2025)
  - Chair: Jonathan Miles
  - Writer Guest: Samantha Mills (author)
  - Special Guest: P. Djèlí Clark
  - Artist Guest: Sara Felix
  - Toastmaster: Jayme Lynn Blaschke
  - Location: Austin Southpark Hotel

== Upcoming conventions ==
- ArmadilloCon 48 (September 11-13, 2026)
  - Chair: Matt Rifley
  - Writer Guest of Honor: Micaiah Johnson
  - Cyberpunk Special Guest: Bruce Sterling
  - Cyberpunk Spacial Guest: Rudy Rucker
  - Special Guest: M. J. Kuhn
  - LitRPG Guest: Plum Parrot
  - Artist Guest of Honor: Ariel Burgess
  - Fan Guest: Keith Barnfather
  - Location: Holiday Inn Austin Midtown
