= Edward E. Smith Memorial Award =

Literary award

The Edward E. Smith Memorial Award for Imaginative Fiction, or Skylark, annually recognizes someone for lifetime contributions to science fiction, "both through work in the field and by exemplifying the personal qualities which made the late 'Doc' Smith well-loved by those who knew him". It is presented by the New England Science Fiction Association at its annual convention, Boskone, to someone chosen by a vote of NESFA members. The trophy is a large lens mounted on a simple plinth.

The award was inaugurated in 1966, the year after Smith's death. Sixty-three people have been honored in 60 years to 2026. Hal Clement received the award twice, in 1969 and 1997.

Skylark recipients

- 1966 Frederik Pohl
- 1967 Isaac Asimov
- 1968 John W. Campbell
- 1969 Hal Clement
- 1970 Judy-Lynn Benjamin del Rey
- 1971 no award
- 1972 Lester del Rey
- 1973 Larry Niven
- 1974 Ben Bova
- 1975 Gordon R. Dickson
- 1976 Anne McCaffrey
- 1977 Jack Gaughan
- 1978 Spider Robinson
- 1979 David Gerrold
- 1980 Jack L. Chalker
- 1981 Frank Kelly Freas
- 1982 Poul Anderson
- 1983 Andre Norton
- 1984 Robert Silverberg
- 1985 Jack Williamson
- 1986 Wilson (Bob) Tucker
- 1987 Vincent Di Fate
- 1988 C. J. Cherryh
- 1989 Gene Wolfe
- 1990 Jane Yolen
- 1991 David Cherry
- 1992 Orson Scott Card
- 1993 Tom Doherty
- 1994 Esther M. Friesner
- 1995 Mike Resnick
- 1996 Joe Haldeman and Gay Haldeman
- 1997 Hal Clement
- 1998 James White
- 1999 Bob Eggleton
- 2000 Bruce Coville
- 2001 Ellen Asher
- 2002 Dave Langford
- 2003 Patrick Nielsen Hayden and Teresa Nielsen Hayden
- 2004 George R.R. Martin
- 2005 Tamora Pierce
- 2006 David G. Hartwell
- 2007 Beth Meacham
- 2008 Charles Stross
- 2009 Terry Pratchett
- 2010 Omar Rayyan
- 2011 Lois McMaster Bujold
- 2012 Sharon Lee and Steve Miller
- 2013 Ginjer Buchanan
- 2014 Robert J. Sawyer
- 2015 Moshe Feder
- 2016 Gardner Dozois
- 2017 Jo Walton
- 2018 Daniel M. Kimmel
- 2019 Melinda M. Snodgrass
- 2020 Betsy Wollheim
- 2021 Anthony R. Lewis
- 2022 Mary Robinette Kowal
- 2023 John Scalzi
- 2024 Delia Sherman and Ellen Kushner
- 2025 Ian Randal Strock
- 2026 Keith R.A. DeCandido

== See also ==
- Science fiction fandom
- List of science fiction awards
