= Liu Weijia (writer) =

Chinese science fiction writer

Liu Weijia (Chinese 刘维佳, Pinyin Liú Wéijiā; * 7 September 1974 in Yichang, Hubei Province, People's Republic of China) is a Chinese science fiction writer. He is a finalist for the Hugo Award for Best Editor (Short Form) in 2024.

== Biography ==
Liu Weijia worked for the Yichang Transportation Group and later became Literary Editor at Science Fiction World in 2000 before becoming known as a science fiction writer.

== Bibliography ==
- 我要活下去, wǒ yào huó xiàqù [„I want to live“] (novel), published in 1996, won second place at the Galaxy Award 1996.
- 高塔下的小镇, gāo tǎxià de xiǎo zhèn [„Small city under the large tower"], won second place at the Galaxy Award 1998.
- 来看天堂, lái kàn tiāntáng [„Come and see the sky"], Reader's Award at the Galaxy Award 2001.
- 使命: 拯救人类, shǐmìng: zhěngjiù rénlèi [„Mission: Save humanity“], published in Science Fiction World in March 2020
