= Lee Harris (editor) =

British fiction editor (born 1968)

- Born: 17 April 1968 (age 58); Cardiff, Wales
- Occupation: Editor
- Children: 2
- Writing career
- Language: English
- Years active: 2009–present
- Genres: Science fiction, fantasy, horror
- Notable awards: Nominations: Hugo Award for Best Editor (Long Form) 2014, 2022, 2023, 2024, 2025; Best Editor (Short Form) 2018 and 2019

Lee Harris (born 1968) is a British editor of science fiction, fantasy and horror. He is the only British editor ever to have been nominated in the Hugo Awards "short form" editing category (with two nominations), and the first British editor ever to have been nominated in the editing "long form" category.

== Biography ==
His early jobs included actor and bartender (where he was a finalist in the Bols / Exchange Bar and Grill Cocktail Bartender of the Year competition in 1993).

He was a professional actor with TV and movie credits to his name.

He was also a director (both company director and stage director) for The Dreaming Production Company from 2003 to 2005 (now no longer operating), a professional theatre group that staged fantasy and horror-themed plays across the UK. He co-wrote and directed the first professional live action adaptation of a Terry Pratchett book, Eric, among others.

=== Publishing career ===
==== Hub Magazine ====
He was the publisher of Hub Magazine from 2007 until 2013. Hub Magazine was a short fiction magazine, which lasted for just two issues in print, before becoming a semi-weekly magazine. The magazine folded with issue 147. The print editions were supported by advertising, and when the magazine moved to online-only, they were sponsored by Orbit (part of Hachette), Solaris and Abaddon (part of Rebellion Publishing) and finally by HarperCollins, where Harris worked as part of the editorial staff at Angry Robot Books.

==== Angry Robot Books ====
Harris joined Angry Robot Books when they formed as part of HarperCollins UK in January 2009, during which time he discovered and published authors such as Wesley Chu, Adam Christopher, Cassandra Rose Clarke and Maurice Broaddus. He started as an assistant editor, and was gradually promoted until he reached the role of senior editor in 2013. He was instrumental in devising and implementing a new ebook subscription service in 2011. He left Angry Robot to head up the editorial division of Macmillan's newly formed Tor.com Publishing imprint.

==== Tor Publishing Group ====
He joined the newly created Tor.com Publishing (part of Macmillan Publishing, and a sister imprint to Tor Books, since rebranded to Tordotcom Publishing) in August 2014, specialising in publishing novellas, though he also edits and publishes full-length novels. His authors' books have won or been nominated for the Nebula and Hugo Awards every year since the imprint's inception, and he regularly edits such authors as Martha Wells, Seanan McGuire, Nnedi Okorafor and Paul Cornell. Seanan McGuire describes him as "Amazing... he makes me better. He forces me to be better. That's a rare and precious thing." In 2020 he was promoted from senior editor to executive editor. As well as acquiring for Tordotcom Publishing he also commissions books for other Tor Publishing Group imprints, including Tor and Nightfire.

Cosmic Lighthouse

In July 2025 IGN announced the launch of a new graphic novel company — Cosmic Lighthouse — co-owned by Harris and Paul Cornell. The company's first title — Salvation's Child by Adrian Tchaikovsky — was named "one of the biggest new titles appearing at [San Diego Comic Con]".

==== Work life ====
Harris travels extensively between his home in the UK and Tordotcom Publishing's Head Office on Broadway in New York. He is also a regular at several British and international conventions, including FantasyCon (UK), the World Fantasy Convention, WorldCon and CONvergence (Minneapolis), where he has been a Guest of Honor on two occasions. On February 8, 2019, he was named as the Guest of Honour for the Canadian science fiction convention, Can*Con.

==== Interviews in the media ====
Harris has been interviewed for various literary and genre publications on a number of occasions, including audio interviews with The Creative Writer's Toolbelt and The Archivos Round Table Podcast. Life in Sci-Fi reported on a kaffeeklatsch Harris hosted at the British science fiction convention, EasterCon. Tor.com interviewed him and the author Seanan McGuire about the multi award-winning book Every Heart a Doorway. He was also interviewed by Ron Charles in the Washington Post], talking about the newly formed Tor.com Publishing imprint. In 2025 he was interviewed by Arley Sorg for the science fiction magazine, Clarkesworld.

=== Personal life ===
==== Affiliations ====
He is a former Chair of the British Fantasy Society, and has chaired two FantasyCon conventions for the society - the first in York in 2014, the second in Nottingham in 2015.

== Written works ==
He has co-written several plays and short stories, including one story published in Snowbooks' Beside the Seaside anthology.

He is also the writer and performer of the Monty Wisdom's Words of Wisdom podcast.

=== Plays ===
- Eric- co-written with Scott Harrison, based on the book by Terry Pratchett
- The Antipope - co-written with Scott Harrison, based on the book by Robert Rankin
- Dracula - (contributor). Mostly written by Scott Harrison, based on the book by Bram Stoker.

== Awards ==
Harris has been nominated for a Hugo Award multiple times for his editing. He is the first British editor of science fiction, fantasy or horror ever to have been nominated for these awards.

- In 2014 he was nominated for the Hugo for Best Editor (Long Form).
- In 2018 he was nominated for the Hugo for Best Editor (Short Form).
- In 2019 he was nominated for the Hugo for Best Editor (Short Form) having received the joint highest number of nominations at the nomination stage.
- In 2022 he was nominated for the Hugo for Best Editor (Long Form), but declined the nomination.
- In 2023 he was nominated for the Hugo for Best Editor (Long Form).
- In 2024 he was nominated for the Hugo for Best Editor (Long Form).
- In 2025 he was nominated for the Hugo for Best Editor (Long Form).
- In 2026 he was nominated for both Long and Short form editor awards under Hugo Award for Best Professional Editor.
