= Hugo Award for Best Professional Editor =

Annual awards for science fiction or fantasy

- Awarded for: The best editor of works devoted primarily to science fiction or fantasy
- Presented by: World Science Fiction Society
- First award: 1973
- Final award: 2006; replaced by Best Editor (Long Form) and Best Editor (Short Form) from 2007–present
- Most recent winner: Diana Pho (Long Form); Neil Clarke (Short Form)
- Website: thehugoawards.org

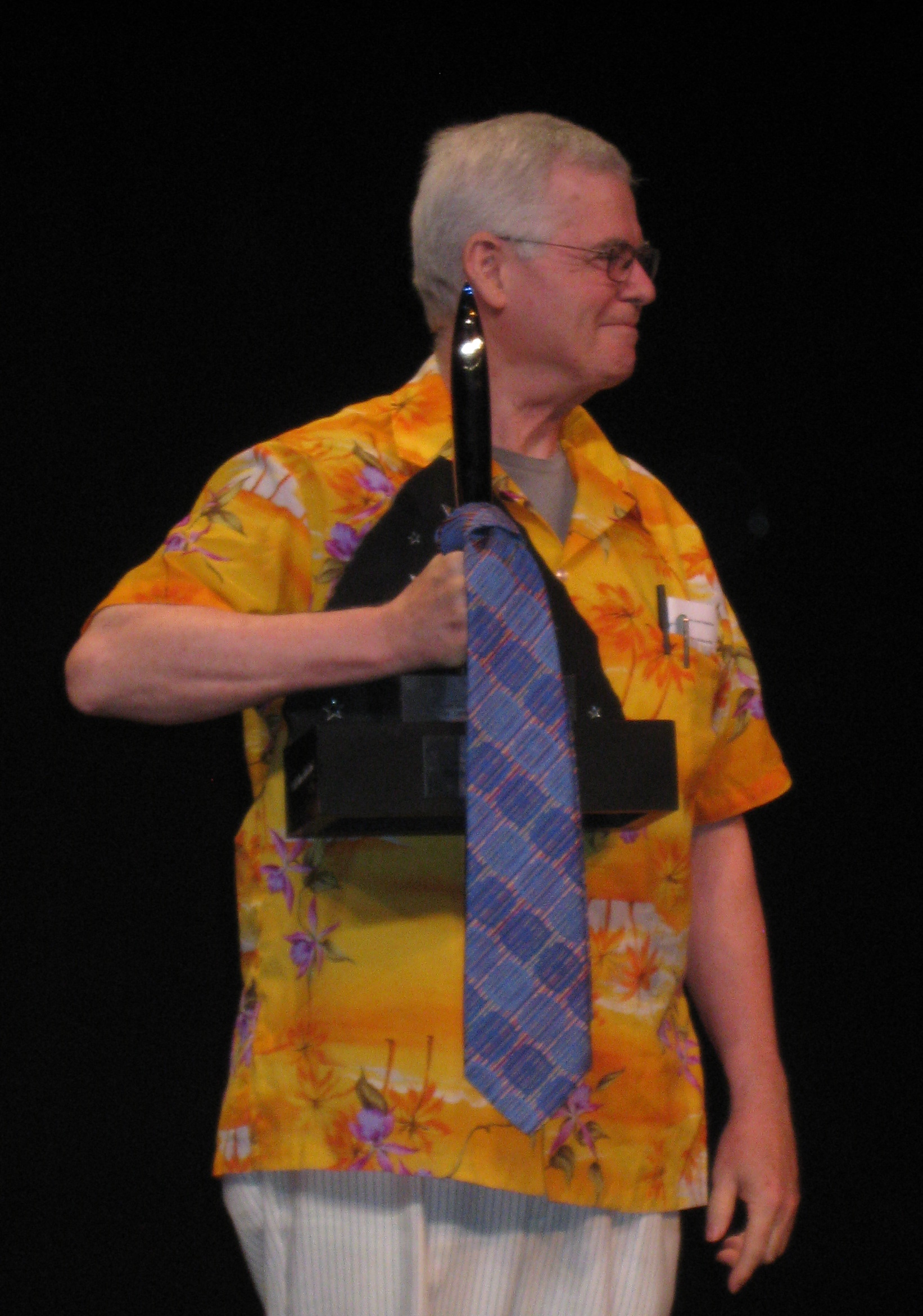
David Hartwell with 2008 Hugo Award for Best Editor (Long Form) (and necktie)

The Hugo Award for Best Professional Editor is one of the Hugo Awards given each year for science fiction or fantasy stories published or translated into English during the previous calendar year. The award is available for editors of magazines, novels, anthologies, or other works related to science fiction or fantasy. The award supplanted a previous award for professionally edited magazines. The Hugo Awards have been described as "a fine showcase for speculative fiction" and "the best known literary award for science fiction writing".

The award was first presented in 1973, and was given annually through 2006. Beginning in 2007, the award was split into two categories, that of Best Editor (Short Form) and Best Editor (Long Form). The Short Form award is for editors of anthologies, collections or magazines, while the Long Form award is for editors of novels. In addition to the regular Hugo awards, between 1996 and 2025, Retrospective Hugo Awards or "Retro-Hugos" were available for works published 50, 75, or 100 years prior. Retro-Hugos could only be awarded for years after 1939 in which no awards were originally given. Retro-Hugo awards were awarded for 1939, 1941, 1943–1946, 1951, and 1954, and in each case an award for professional editor was given.

During the 61 nomination years, 97 editors have been finalists for the original Best Professional Editor, the Short Form, or the Long Form award, including Retro Hugos. Of these, Gardner Dozois has received the most awards, with 15 original awards out of 19 final ballot nominations for the original category and 1 out of 2 for the Short Form. The only other editors to win more than three awards are Ellen Datlow, who won 9 of 18 nominations, split between the original and short form awards, Ben Bova, who won 6 of 8 nominations for the original award, Neil Clarke with 5 out of 13 Short Form nominations, and John W. Campbell Jr. with 8 out of 8 nominations for the Retro Hugo awards. The two editors who have won three times are Edward L. Ferman with 3 out of 20 original nominations, and Patrick Nielsen Hayden with 3 out of 4 Long Form nominations. Stanley Schmidt has received the most nominations, at 27 original and 7 Short Form, winning one Short Form.

== Selection ==
Hugo Award nominees and winners are chosen by supporting or attending members of the annual World Science Fiction Convention, or Worldcon, and the presentation evening constitutes its central event. The selection process is defined in the World Science Fiction Society Constitution as instant-runoff voting with six finalists, except in the case of a tie. The works on the ballot are the six most-nominated by members that year, with no limit on the number of works that can be nominated. Initial nominations are made by members in January through March, while voting on the ballot of six finalists is performed roughly in April through July, subject to change depending on when that year's Worldcon is held. Prior to 2017, the final ballot was five works; it was changed that year to six, with each initial nominator limited to five nominations. Worldcons are generally held near Labor Day, and are held in a different city around the world each year. Members are permitted to vote "no award", if they feel that none of the finalists is deserving of the award that year, and in the case that "no award" takes the majority the Hugo is not given in that category. This happened in both the Short Form and Long Form categories in 2015.

== Winners and finalists ==
In the following tables, the years correspond to the date of the ceremony. Editors are eligible based on their work of the previous calendar year, and each date links to the "year in literature" article corresponding with when those works were eligible. Although the Best Professional Editor award is not given explicitly for any particular editing effort and such works are not recorded by the World Science Fiction Society, works that the editor in question was involved with in the eligibility period are listed. This list includes magazines or anthologies that the editor worked on and publishing houses that they were employed at, and is not intended to be comprehensive. Entries with a yellow background and an asterisk (*) next to the editor's name have won the award; those with a gray background are the finalists on the short-list.

=== Best Professional Editor ===
* Winners and joint winners
+ No winner selected

Best Professional Editor winners and finalists
Year	Editor	Work(s)	Ref(s)
1973	Ben Bova*	Analog Science Fact & Fiction	
1973	Terry Carr	The Best Science Fiction of the Year	
1973	Edward L. Ferman	The Magazine of Fantasy and Science Fiction	
1973	Ted White	Amazing Stories, Fantastic	
1973	Donald A. Wollheim	The 1972 Annual World's Best SF	
1974	Ben Bova*	Analog Science Fact & Fiction	
1974	Terry Carr	The Best Science Fiction of the Year #2	
1974	Edward L. Ferman	The Magazine of Fantasy and Science Fiction	
1974	Robert Silverberg	New Dimensions 3	
1974	Ted White	Amazing Stories, Fantastic	
1974	Donald A. Wollheim	The 1973 Annual World's Best SF	
1975	Ben Bova*	Analog Science Fact & Fiction	
1975	James Baen	Galaxy Science Fiction, If	
1975	Terry Carr	The Best Science Fiction of the Year #3	
1975	Edward L. Ferman	The Magazine of Fantasy and Science Fiction	
1975	Robert Silverberg	New Dimensions IV	
1975	Ted White	Amazing Stories, Fantastic	
1976	Ben Bova*	Analog Science Fact & Fiction	
1976	James Baen	Galaxy Science Fiction	
1976	Edward L. Ferman	The Magazine of Fantasy and Science Fiction	
1976	Robert Silverberg	New Dimensions 5	
1976	Ted White	Amazing Stories, Fantastic	
1977	Ben Bova*	Analog Science Fact & Fiction	
1977	James Baen	Galaxy Science Fiction	
1977	Terry Carr	The Best Science Fiction of the Year #5	
1977	Edward L. Ferman	The Magazine of Fantasy and Science Fiction	
1977	Ted White	Amazing Stories, Fantastic	
1978	George H. Scithers*	Asimov's Science Fiction	
1978	James Baen	Galaxy Science Fiction	
1978	Ben Bova	Analog Science Fact & Fiction	
1978	Terry Carr	The Best Science Fiction of the Year #6	
1978	Edward L. Ferman	The Magazine of Fantasy and Science Fiction	
1979	Ben Bova*	Analog Science Fact & Fiction, Omni	
1979	James Baen	Ace Books	
1979	Terry Carr	The Best Science Fiction of the Year #7	
1979	Edward L. Ferman	The Magazine of Fantasy and Science Fiction	
1979	George H. Scithers	Asimov's Science Fiction	
1980	George H. Scithers*	Asimov's Science Fiction	
1980	James Baen	Ace Books	
1980	Ben Bova	Omni	
1980	Edward L. Ferman	The Magazine of Fantasy & Science Fiction	
1980	Stanley Schmidt	Analog Science Fact & Fiction	
1981	Edward L. Ferman*	The Magazine of Fantasy & Science Fiction	
1981	James Baen	Tor Books	
1981	Terry Carr	The Best Science Fiction of the Year #9	
1981	Stanley Schmidt	Analog Science Fact & Fiction	
1981	George H. Scithers	Asimov's Science Fiction	
1982	Edward L. Ferman*	The Magazine of Fantasy & Science Fiction	
1982	Terry Carr	The Best Science Fiction of the Year #10	
1982	David G. Hartwell	Pocket Books	
1982	Stanley Schmidt	Analog Science Fact & Fiction	
1982	George H. Scithers	Asimov's Science Fiction	
1983	Edward L. Ferman*	The Magazine of Fantasy & Science Fiction	
1983	Terry Carr	The Best Science Fiction of the Year #11	
1983	David G. Hartwell	Pocket Books	
1983	Stanley Schmidt	Analog Science Fact & Fiction	
1983	George H. Scithers	Amazing Stories, Asimov's Science Fiction	
1984	Shawna McCarthy*	Asimov's Science Fiction	
1984	Terry Carr	The Best Science Fiction of the Year #12	
1984	Edward L. Ferman	The Magazine of Fantasy & Science Fiction	
1984	David G. Hartwell	Pocket Books	
1984	Stanley Schmidt	Analog Science Fact & Fiction	
1985	Terry Carr*	The Best Science Fiction of the Year #13	
1985	Edward L. Ferman	The Magazine of Fantasy & Science Fiction	
1985	Shawna McCarthy	Asimov's Science Fiction	
1985	Stanley Schmidt	Analog Science Fact & Fiction	
1985	George H. Scithers	Amazing Stories	
1986	Judy-Lynn del Rey* (Note: The 1986 award was posthumously given to Judy-Lynn del Rey after her death in 1985 but was declined by her husband Lester del Rey in her name, saying that she would have objected to the award being given to her just because she had recently died. The Hugo Awards site continues to list her as the winner for that year.)	Del Rey Books	
1986	Terry Carr	The Best Science Fiction of the Year #14	
1986	Edward L. Ferman	The Magazine of Fantasy & Science Fiction	
1986	Shawna McCarthy	Asimov's Science Fiction	
1986	Stanley Schmidt	Analog Science Fact & Fiction	
1987	Terry Carr*	The Best Science Fiction of the Year #15	
1987	Gardner Dozois	Asimov's Science Fiction, The Year's Best Science Fiction: Third Annual Collection	
1987	Edward L. Ferman	The Magazine of Fantasy & Science Fiction	
1987	David G. Hartwell	Tor Books	
1987	Stanley Schmidt	Analog Science Fact & Fiction	
1988	Gardner Dozois*	Asimov's Science Fiction, The Year's Best Science Fiction: Fourth Annual Collection	
1988	Edward L. Ferman	Fantasy & Science Fiction	
1988	David G. Hartwell	Tor Books	
1988	Stanley Schmidt	Analog Science Fact & Fiction	
1988	Brian Thomsen	Warner Books	
1989	Gardner Dozois*	Asimov's Science Fiction, The Year's Best Science Fiction: Fifth Annual Collection	
1989	Edward L. Ferman	Fantasy & Science Fiction	
1989	David G. Hartwell	The New York Review of Science Fiction, Tor Books	
1989	Charles C. Ryan	Aboriginal Science Fiction	
1989	Stanley Schmidt	Analog Science Fact & Fiction	
1990	Gardner Dozois*	Asimov's Science Fiction, The Year's Best Science Fiction: Sixth Annual Collection	
1990	Ellen Datlow	Omni, Year's Best Fantasy and Horror #2	
1990	Edward L. Ferman	Fantasy & Science Fiction	
1990	David G. Hartwell	The New York Review of Science Fiction, Tor Books	
1990	Beth Meacham	Tor Books	
1990	Charles C. Ryan	Aboriginal Science Fiction	
1990	Stanley Schmidt	Analog Science Fact & Fiction	
1991	Gardner Dozois*	Asimov's Science Fiction, The Year's Best Science Fiction: Seventh Annual Collection	
1991	Ellen Datlow	Omni, Year's Best Fantasy and Horror #3	
1991	Edward L. Ferman	Fantasy & Science Fiction	
1991	Kristine Kathryn Rusch	Pulphouse: The Hardback Magazine	
1991	Stanley Schmidt	Analog Science Fact & Fiction	
1992	Gardner Dozois*	Asimov's Science Fiction, The Year's Best Science Fiction: Eighth Annual Collection	
1992	Ellen Datlow	Omni, Year's Best Fantasy and Horror #4	
1992	Edward L. Ferman	Fantasy & Science Fiction	
1992	Kristine Kathryn Rusch	Fantasy & Science Fiction, Pulphouse: The Hardback Magazine	
1992	Stanley Schmidt	Analog Science Fact & Fiction	
1993	Gardner Dozois*	Asimov's Science Fiction, The Year's Best Science Fiction: Ninth Annual Collection	
1993	Ellen Datlow	Omni, Year's Best Fantasy and Horror #5	
1993	Beth Meacham	Tor Books	
1993	Kristine Kathryn Rusch	Fantasy & Science Fiction, Pulphouse: The Hardback Magazine	
1993	Stanley Schmidt	Analog Science Fiction and Fact	
1994	Kristine Kathryn Rusch*	Fantasy & Science Fiction, Pulphouse: The Hardback Magazine	
1994	Ellen Datlow	Omni, Year's Best Fantasy and Horror #6	
1994	Gardner Dozois	Asimov's Science Fiction, The Year's Best Science Fiction: Tenth Annual Collection	
1994	Mike Resnick	Alternate Warriors, Christmas Ghosts, Future Earths: Under African Skies	
1994	Stanley Schmidt	Analog Science Fiction and Fact	
1995	Gardner Dozois*	Asimov's Science Fiction, The Year's Best Science Fiction: Eleventh Annual Collection	
1995	Ellen Datlow	Omni, Year's Best Fantasy and Horror #7	
1995	Mike Resnick	Alternate Outlaws, By Any Other Fame, Deals With the Devil	
1995	Kristine Kathryn Rusch	Fantasy & Science Fiction	
1995	Stanley Schmidt	Analog Science Fiction and Fact	
1996	Gardner Dozois*	Asimov's Science Fiction, The Year's Best Science Fiction: Twelfth Annual Collection	
1996	Ellen Datlow	Omni, Year's Best Fantasy and Horror #8	
1996	Scott Edelman	Science Fiction Age	
1996	Kristine Kathryn Rusch	Fantasy & Science Fiction	
1996	Stanley Schmidt	Analog Science Fiction and Fact	
1997	Gardner Dozois*	Asimov's Science Fiction, The Year's Best Science Fiction: Thirteenth Annual Collection	
1997	Scott Edelman	Science Fiction Age	
1997	Patrick Nielsen Hayden	Tor Books	
1997	Kristine Kathryn Rusch	Fantasy & Science Fiction	
1997	Stanley Schmidt	Analog Science Fiction and Fact	
1998	Gardner Dozois*	Asimov's Science Fiction, The Year's Best Science Fiction: Fourteenth Annual Collection	
1998	Scott Edelman	Science Fiction Age	
1998	David G. Hartwell	The New York Review of Science Fiction, Tor Books, Year's Best SF 2	
1998	Stanley Schmidt	Analog Science Fiction and Fact	
1998	Gordon Van Gelder	Fantasy & Science Fiction	
1999	Gardner Dozois*	Asimov's Science Fiction, The Year's Best Science Fiction: Fifteenth Annual Collection	
1999	Scott Edelman	Science Fiction Age	
1999	David G. Hartwell	The New York Review of Science Fiction, Tor Books, Year's Best SF 3	
1999	Patrick Nielsen Hayden	Tor Books	
1999	Stanley Schmidt	Analog Science Fiction and Fact	
1999	Gordon Van Gelder	Fantasy & Science Fiction	
2000	Gardner Dozois*	Asimov's Science Fiction, The Year's Best Science Fiction: Sixteenth Annual Collection	
2000	David G. Hartwell	The New York Review of Science Fiction, Tor Books, Year's Best SF 4	
2000	Patrick Nielsen Hayden	Tor Books	
2000	Stanley Schmidt	Analog Science Fiction and Fact	
2000	Gordon Van Gelder	Fantasy & Science Fiction	
2001	Gardner Dozois*	Asimov's Science Fiction, The Year's Best Science Fiction: Seventeenth Annual Collection	
2001	Ellen Datlow	Sci Fiction, Year's Best Fantasy and Horror #13	
2001	David G. Hartwell	The New York Review of Science Fiction, Tor Books, Year's Best SF 5	
2001	Stanley Schmidt	Analog Science Fiction and Fact	
2001	Gordon Van Gelder	Fantasy & Science Fiction	
2002	Ellen Datlow*	Sci Fiction, Year's Best Fantasy and Horror #14	
2002	Gardner Dozois	Asimov's Science Fiction, The Year's Best Science Fiction: Eighteenth Annual Collection	
2002	Patrick Nielsen Hayden	Tor Books	
2002	Stanley Schmidt	Analog Science Fiction and Fact	
2002	Gordon Van Gelder	Fantasy & Science Fiction	
2003	Gardner Dozois*	Asimov's Science Fiction, The Year's Best Science Fiction: Nineteenth Annual Collection	
2003	Ellen Datlow	Sci Fiction, Year's Best Fantasy and Horror #15	
2003	David G. Hartwell	The New York Review of Science Fiction, Tor Books, Year's Best Fantasy 2, Year's Best SF 7	
2003	Stanley Schmidt	Analog Science Fiction and Fact	
2003	Gordon Van Gelder	Fantasy & Science Fiction	
2004	Gardner Dozois*	Asimov's Science Fiction, The Year's Best Science Fiction: Twentieth Annual Collection	
2004	Ellen Datlow	Sci Fiction, Year's Best Fantasy and Horror #16	
2004	David G. Hartwell	The New York Review of Science Fiction, Tor Books, Year's Best Fantasy 3, Year's Best SF 8	
2004	Stanley Schmidt	Analog Science Fiction and Fact	
2004	Gordon Van Gelder	Fantasy & Science Fiction	
2005	Ellen Datlow*	Sci Fiction, Year's Best Fantasy and Horror #17	
2005	Gardner Dozois	Asimov's Science Fiction, The Year's Best Science Fiction: Twenty-First Annual Collection	
2005	David G. Hartwell	The New York Review of Science Fiction, Tor Books, Year's Best Fantasy 4, Year's Best SF 9	
2005	Stanley Schmidt	Analog Science Fiction and Fact	
2005	Gordon Van Gelder	Fantasy & Science Fiction	
2006	David G. Hartwell*	The New York Review of Science Fiction, Tor Books, Year's Best Fantasy 5, Year's Best SF 10	
2006	Ellen Datlow	Sci Fiction, Year's Best Fantasy and Horror #18	
2006	Stanley Schmidt	Analog Science Fiction and Fact	
2006	Gordon Van Gelder	Fantasy & Science Fiction	
2006	Sheila Williams	Asimov's Science Fiction	

=== Long Form ===
Starting with the 2007 awards, the Professional Editor award was split into two categories: Best Editor (Long Form) and Best Editor (Short Form). The Long Form award is for "the editor of at least four novel-length works primarily devoted to science fiction and/or fantasy published in the previous calendar year" in the official Hugo Award rules.

Long Form winners and finalists
Year	Editor	Work(s)	Ref(s)
2007	Patrick Nielsen Hayden*	Tor Books	
2007	Lou Anders	Pyr	
2007	Jim Baen	Baen Books	
2007	Ginjer Buchanan	Ace Books	
2007	David G. Hartwell	Tor Books	
2008	David G. Hartwell*	Tor Books	
2008	Lou Anders	Pyr	
2008	Ginjer Buchanan	Ace Books	
2008	Beth Meacham	Tor Books	
2008	Patrick Nielsen Hayden	Tor Books	
2009	David G. Hartwell*	Tor Books	
2009	Lou Anders	Pyr	
2009	Ginjer Buchanan	Ace Books	
2009	Beth Meacham	Tor Books	
2009	Patrick Nielsen Hayden	Tor Books	
2010	Patrick Nielsen Hayden*	Tor Books	
2010	Lou Anders	Pyr	
2010	Ginjer Buchanan	Ace Books	
2010	Liz Gorinsky	Tor Books	
2010	Juliet Ulman	Bantam Spectra	
2011	Lou Anders*	Pyr	
2011	Ginjer Buchanan	Ace Books	
2011	Moshe Feder	Tor Books	
2011	Liz Gorinsky	Tor Books	
2011	Nick Mamatas	Haikasoru	
2011	Beth Meacham	Tor Books	
2011	Juliet Ulman	Bantam Spectra	
2012	Betsy Wollheim*	DAW Books	
2012	Lou Anders	Pyr	
2012	Liz Gorinsky	Tor Books	
2012	Anne Lesley Groell	Bantam Spectra	
2012	Patrick Nielsen Hayden	Tor Books	
2013	Patrick Nielsen Hayden*	Tor Books	
2013	Lou Anders	Pyr	
2013	Sheila Gilbert	DAW Books	
2013	Liz Gorinsky	Tor Books	
2013	Toni Weisskopf	Baen Books	
2014	Ginjer Buchanan*	Ace Books	
2014	Sheila Gilbert	DAW Books	
2014	Liz Gorinsky	Tor Books	
2014	Lee Harris	Angry Robot	
2014	Toni Weisskopf	Baen Books	
2015	(no award)+		(Note: Several categories, including Best Professional Editor (long and short forms), were awarded to "No award" in 2015 in response to the Sad Puppies and Rabid Puppies ballot manipulation campaigns.)
2015	Vox Day	Castalia House	
2015	Sheila Gilbert	DAW Books	
2015	Jim Minz	Baen Books	
2015	Anne Sowards	Ace Books	
2015	Toni Weisskopf	Baen Books	
2016	Sheila Gilbert*	DAW Books	
2016	Vox Day	Castalia House	
2016	Liz Gorinsky	Tor Books	
2016	Jim Minz	Baen Books	
2016	Toni Weisskopf	Baen Books	
2017	Liz Gorinsky*	Tor Books	
2017	Vox Day	Castalia House	
2017	Sheila Gilbert	DAW Books	
2017	Devi Pillai	Tor Books	
2017	Miriam Weinberg	Tor Books	
2017	Navah Wolfe	Saga Press	
2018	Sheila Gilbert*	DAW Books	
2018	Joe Monti	Saga Press	
2018	Diana Pho	Tor Books	
2018	Devi Pillai	Tor Books	
2018	Miriam Weinberg	Tor Books	
2018	Navah Wolfe	Saga Press	
2019	Navah Wolfe*	Saga Press	
2019	Sheila Gilbert	DAW Books	
2019	Anne Lesley Groell	Bantam Spectra	
2019	Beth Meacham	Tor Books	
2019	Diana Pho	Tor Books	
2019	Gillian Redfearn	Victor Gollancz Ltd	
2020	Navah Wolfe*	Saga Press	
2020	Sheila Gilbert	DAW Books	
2020	Brit Hvide	Orbit Books	
2020	Diana Pho	Tor Books	
2020	Devi Pillai	Tor Books	
2020	Miriam Weinberg	Tor Books	
2021	Diana Pho*	Tor Books	
2021	Nivia Evans	Orbit Books	
2021	Sheila Gilbert	DAW Books	
2021	Sarah Guan	Erewhon Books	
2021	Brit Hvide	Orbit Books	
2021	Navah Wolfe	Saga Press	
2022	Ruoxi Chen*	Tordotcom Publishing	
2022	Nivia Evans	Orbit Books	
2022	Sarah Guan	Erewhon Books	
2022	Brit Hvide	Orbit Books	
2022	Patrick Nielsen Hayden	Tor Books	
2022	Navah Wolfe	Saga Press	
2023	Lindsey Hall*	Tor Books/Forge Books	
2023	Ruoxi Chen	Tordotcom Publishing	
2023	Lee Harris	Tordotcom Publishing	
2023	Sarah Peed	Del Rey Books	
2023	Huan Yan	Sichuan Science and Technology Publishing House	
2023	Haijun Yao	Science Fiction World	
2024	Ruoxi Chen*	Tordotcom Publishing	
2024	Lindsey Hall	Tor Books/Forge Books	
2024	Lee Harris	Tordotcom Publishing	
2024	Kelly Lonesome	Tor Nightfire	
2024	David Thomas Moore	Solaris Books	
2024	Haijun Yao	Science Fiction World	
2025	Diana Pho*	Erewhon	
2025	Carl Engle-Laird	Tordotcom Publishing	
2025	Ali Fisher	Tor Books	
2025	Lee Harris	Tordotcom Publishing	
2025	David Thomas Moore	Solaris Books	
2025	Stephanie Stein	Tor Books	
2026	Diana Pho*	Erewhon	
2026	Carl Engle-Laird	Tor Books	
2026	Jaymee Goh	Tachyon Publications	
2026	Lee Harris	Tor Books	
2026	Jenni Hill	Orbit Books	
2026	Joe Monti	Saga Press	

=== Short Form ===
The Best Editor Short Form award, also started in 2007, is given to "the editor of at least four anthologies, collections or magazine issues primarily devoted to science fiction and/or fantasy, at least one of which was published in the previous calendar year."

Short Form winners and finalists
Year	Editor	Work(s)	Ref(s)
2007	Gordon Van Gelder*	Fantasy & Science Fiction	
2007	Gardner Dozois	The Year's Best Science Fiction: Twenty-Third Annual Collection	
2007	David G. Hartwell	The New York Review of Science Fiction, Tor Books, Year's Best Fantasy 6, Year's Best SF 11	
2007	Stanley Schmidt	Analog Science Fiction and Fact	
2007	Sheila Williams	Asimov's Science Fiction	
2008	Gordon Van Gelder*	Fantasy & Science Fiction	
2008	Ellen Datlow	Year's Best Fantasy and Horror #20	
2008	Stanley Schmidt	Analog Science Fiction and Fact	
2008	Jonathan Strahan	The New Space Opera, The Best Science Fiction and Fantasy of the Year	
2008	Sheila Williams	Asimov's Science Fiction	
2009	Ellen Datlow*	Year's Best Fantasy and Horror #21	
2009	Stanley Schmidt	Analog Science Fiction and Fact	
2009	Jonathan Strahan	The Best Science Fiction and Fantasy of the Year 2	
2009	Gordon Van Gelder	Fantasy & Science Fiction	
2009	Sheila Williams	Asimov's Science Fiction	
2010	Ellen Datlow*	Best Horror of the Year, Nebula Awards Showcase 2009	
2010	Stanley Schmidt	Analog Science Fiction and Fact	
2010	Jonathan Strahan	The Best Science Fiction and Fantasy of the Year 3	
2010	Gordon Van Gelder	Fantasy & Science Fiction	
2010	Sheila Williams	Asimov's Science Fiction	
2011	Sheila Williams*	Asimov's Science Fiction	
2011	John Joseph Adams	Lightspeed Magazine	
2011	Stanley Schmidt	Analog Science Fiction and Fact	
2011	Jonathan Strahan	The Best Science Fiction and Fantasy of the Year 4	
2011	Gordon Van Gelder	Fantasy & Science Fiction	
2012	Sheila Williams*	Asimov's Science Fiction	
2012	John Joseph Adams	Lightspeed Magazine	
2012	Neil Clarke	Clarkesworld Magazine	
2012	Stanley Schmidt	Analog Science Fiction and Fact	
2012	Jonathan Strahan	The Best Science Fiction and Fantasy of the Year 5	
2013	Stanley Schmidt*	Analog Science Fiction and Fact	
2013	John Joseph Adams	Lightspeed Magazine	
2013	Neil Clarke	Clarkesworld Magazine	
2013	Jonathan Strahan	The Best Science Fiction and Fantasy of the Year 6	
2013	Sheila Williams	Asimov's Science Fiction	
2014	Ellen Datlow*	Best Horror of the Year	
2014	John Joseph Adams	Lightspeed Magazine	
2014	Neil Clarke	Clarkesworld Magazine	
2014	Jonathan Strahan	The Best Science Fiction and Fantasy of the Year 7	
2014	Sheila Williams	Asimov's Science Fiction	
2015	(no award)+		
2015	Jennifer Brozek	Chicks Dig Gaming: A Celebration of All Thing Gaming by the Women Who Love it	
2015	Vox Day	Castalia House	
2015	Mike Resnick	Galaxy's Edge	
2015	Edmund R. Schubert (Note: Edmund R. Schubert attempted to withdraw from the 2015 ballot, stating that the prevalence of finalists that year from voting slates — one of which had included him — de-legitimized the ballot. While other finalists that year in other categories had withdrawn for the same reason, Schubert's request came after the ballot was finalized; as such, it was not accepted, though a note of his intention to withdraw was made on the ballot itself.)	Orson Scott Card's InterGalactic Medicine Show	
2015	Bryan Thomas Schmidt	Shattered Shields	
2016	Ellen Datlow*	Best Horror of the Year	
2016	John Joseph Adams	Lightspeed Magazine	
2016	Neil Clarke	Clarkesworld Magazine	
2016	Jerry Pournelle	Castalia House	
2016	Sheila Williams	Asimov's Science Fiction	
2017	Ellen Datlow*	Best Horror of the Year	
2017	John Joseph Adams	Lightspeed Magazine	
2017	Neil Clarke	Clarkesworld Magazine	
2017	Jonathan Strahan	The Best Science Fiction and Fantasy of the Year 10	
2017	Lynne M. Thomas and Michael Damian Thomas	Uncanny Magazine	
2017	Sheila Williams	Asimov's Science Fiction	
2018	Lynne M. Thomas and Michael Damian Thomas*	Uncanny Magazine	
2018	John Joseph Adams	Lightspeed Magazine	
2018	Neil Clarke	Clarkesworld Magazine	
2018	Lee Harris	Tor.com Publishing	
2018	Jonathan Strahan	The Best Science Fiction and Fantasy of the Year 11	
2018	Sheila Williams	Asimov's Science Fiction	
2019	Gardner Dozois	The Year's Best Science Fiction: Thirty-Fifth Annual Collection	
2019	Neil Clarke	Clarkesworld Magazine	
2019	Lee Harris	Tor.com Publishing	
2019	Julia Rios	Fireside Magazine	
2019	Lynne M. Thomas and Michael Damian Thomas	Uncanny Magazine	
2019	E. Catherine Tobler	Shimmer Magazine	
2020	Ellen Datlow*	Best Horror of the Year	
2020	Neil Clarke	Clarkesworld Magazine	
2020	Charles Coleman Finlay	The Magazine of Fantasy & Science Fiction	
2020	Jonathan Strahan	The Best Science Fiction and Fantasy of the Year 13	
2020	Lynne M. Thomas and Michael Damian Thomas	Uncanny Magazine	
2020	Sheila Williams	Asimov's Science Fiction	
2021	Ellen Datlow*	Best Horror of the Year	
2021	Neil Clarke	Clarkesworld Magazine	
2021	Charles Coleman Finlay	The Magazine of Fantasy & Science Fiction	
2021	Mur Lafferty and S. B. Divya	Escape Pod	
2021	Jonathan Strahan	The Year's Best Science Fiction: The Saga Anthology of SF 2021	
2021	Sheila Williams	Asimov's Science Fiction	
2022	Neil Clarke*	Clarkesworld Magazine	
2022	Oghenechovwe Donald Ekpeki	The Year's Best African Speculative Fiction	
2022	Mur Lafferty and S. B. Divya	Escape Pod	
2022	Jonathan Strahan	The Year's Best Science Fiction: The Saga Anthology of SF 2022	
2022	Sheree Renée Thomas	The Magazine of Fantasy & Science Fiction	
2022	Sheila Williams	Asimov's Science Fiction	
2023	Neil Clarke*	Clarkesworld Magazine	
2023	Scott H. Andrews	Beneath Ceaseless Skies	
2023	Oghenechovwe Donald Ekpeki	Africa Risen: A New Era of Speculative Fiction	
2023	Sheree Renée Thomas	The Magazine of Fantasy & Science Fiction	
2023	Xu Wang	Xingyun XII	
2023	Feng Yang	Galaxy's Edge	
2024	Neil Clarke*	Clarkesworld Magazine	
2024	Scott H. Andrews	Beneath Ceaseless Skies	
2024	Liu Weijia	The Best of Chinese Metropolis Science Fiction: The Annual Rings of the Earth	
2024	Jonathan Strahan	The Book of Witches, Communications Breakdown	
2024	Lynne M. Thomas and Michael Damian Thomas	Uncanny Magazine	
2024	Feng Yang	Galaxy's Edge	
2025	Neil Clarke*	Clarkesworld Magazine	
2025	Scott H. Andrews	Beneath Ceaseless Skies	
2025	Jennifer Brozek	99 Fleeting Fantasies	
2025	Jonathan Strahan	New Adventures in Space Opera	
2025	Lynne M. Thomas and Michael Damian Thomas	Uncanny Magazine	
2025	Sheila Williams	Asimov's Science Fiction	
2026	Neil Clarke*	Clarkesworld Magazine	
2026	Scott H. Andrews	Beneath Ceaseless Skies	
2026	Jennifer Brozek	Augment Magazine, Gudnak Means War	
2026	Lee Harris	Reactor	
2026	Michael Damian Thomas	Uncanny Magazine	
2026	Sheila Williams	Asimov's Science Fiction	

=== Retro Hugos ===
Between the 1996 Worldcon and 2025 Worldcon, the World Science Fiction Society had the concept of "Retro-Hugos", in which the Hugo award could be retroactively awarded for 50, 75, or 100 years prior. Retro-Hugos could only be awarded for years after 1939 (the year of the first Worldcon) in which no Hugos were originally awarded. Retro Hugos were awarded eight times, for 1939, 1941, 1943–1946, 1951, and 1954. In 1946, 1951, and 1954, the award was given for Best Professional Editor, as the category had not been split, while for the others it was given for Short Form only as Long Form did not have enough responses to make a ballot.

Retro Hugos winners and finalists
Year	Year awarded	Editor	Work(s)	Ref(s)
1939	2014	John W. Campbell, Jr.*	Astounding Science-Fiction	
1939	2014	Walter H. Gillings	Tales of Wonder	
1939	2014	Raymond A. Palmer	Amazing Stories	
1939	2014	Mort Weisinger	Thrilling Wonder Stories	
1939	2014	Farnsworth Wright	Weird Tales	
1941	2016	John W. Campbell, Jr.*	Astounding Science-Fiction	
1941	2016	Dorothy McIlwraith	Weird Tales	
1941	2016	Raymond A. Palmer	Amazing Stories	
1941	2016	Frederik Pohl	Astonishing Stories, Super Science Stories	
1941	2016	Mort Weisinger	Thrilling Wonder Stories	
1943	2018	John W. Campbell, Jr.*	Astounding Science-Fiction	
1943	2018	Oscar J. Friend	Thrilling Wonder Stories	
1943	2018	Dorothy McIlwraith	Weird Tales	
1943	2018	Raymond A. Palmer	Amazing Stories	
1943	2018	Malcolm Reiss	Planet Stories	
1943	2018	Donald A. Wollheim	The Viking Portable Novels of Science	
1944	2019	John W. Campbell, Jr.*	Astounding Science-Fiction	
1944	2019	Oscar J. Friend	Thrilling Wonder Stories	
1944	2019	Mary Gnaedinger	Famous Fantastic Mysteries	
1944	2019	Dorothy McIlwraith	Weird Tales	
1944	2019	Raymond A. Palmer	Amazing Stories	
1944	2019	Donald A. Wollheim	The Viking Portable Novels of Science	
1945	2020	John W. Campbell, Jr.*	Astounding Science-Fiction	
1945	2020	Oscar J. Friend	Thrilling Wonder Stories	
1945	2020	Mary Gnaedinger	Famous Fantastic Mysteries	
1945	2020	Dorothy McIlwraith	Weird Tales	
1945	2020	Raymond A. Palmer	Amazing Stories	
1945	2020	W. Scott Peacock	Planet Stories	
1946	1996	John W. Campbell, Jr.*	Astounding Science-Fiction	
1946	1996	Sam Merwin, Jr.	Startling Stories, Wonder Stories	
1946	1996	Raymond A. Palmer	Amazing Stories	
1946	1996	Donald A. Wollheim	The Viking Portable Novels of Science	
1951	2001	John W. Campbell, Jr.*	Astounding Science-Fiction	
1951	2001	Anthony Boucher	The Magazine of Fantasy & Science Fiction	
1951	2001	Groff Conklin	Big Book of Science Fiction, The Science Fiction Galaxy	
1951	2001	H. L. Gold	Galaxy Science Fiction	
1951	2001	J. Francis McComas	The Magazine of Fantasy & Science Fiction	
1954	2004	John W. Campbell, Jr.*	Astounding Science-Fiction	
1954	2004	Anthony Boucher	The Magazine of Fantasy & Science Fiction	
1954	2004	H. L. Gold	Beyond Fantasy Fiction, Galaxy Science Fiction	
1954	2004	Frederik Pohl	Star Science Fiction Stories No.1, Star Science Fiction Stories No.2	
1954	2004	Donald A. Wollheim	Ace Books	
