= Scott Harrison (writer) =

British novelist, scriptwriter, playwright and film writer

- Born: 18 September 1973 (age 53); Derby, UK
- Occupations: Novelist, Scriptwriter, Playwright
- Writing career
- Period: 2003 -
- Website: scottvharrison.blogspot.co.uk

Scott Harrison (born 18 September 1973) is a British novelist, scriptwriter, playwright and film writer. Between 2002 and 2005 he was writer-in-residence for the York-based professional theatre company The Dreaming. He also co-produced, and occasionally acted in, several of its productions.

He has written Star Trek books for Simon & Schuster and tie-in novels for games developer Capcom, as well as a number of audio plays and novels for various Big Finish Productions. Between 2012 and 2014, he edited a range of short-story anthologies.

In April 2014, his audio play Sometime Never, starring Simon Jones and Rosalyn Landor, won the Best Drama Award in New York, while in May of the same year, the portmanteau audio horror anthology, THIRTEEN, which Harrison devised, edited and wrote the narrating story for, won an Audie Award for best Original Work.

He also provides film essays and audio commentaries for several blu-ray companies, including the BFI, Eureka! Video and Second Sight Films in the UK and Imprint Films in Australia.

== Bibliography ==
=== Books ===
- Blake's 7: Archangel (Big Finish, 2012)
- Remember Me: The Pandora Archive (Capcom, 2013)
- Star Trek: Shadow Of The Machine (Simon & Schuster, 2015)

=== Audio Novels ===
- Dorian Gray: The Lost Tales - Last Man Standing (Big Finish, 2019)
- Dorian Gray: The Lost Tales - There Are Such Things... (Big Finish, 2019)
- Dorian Gray: The Lost Tales - The Last Confession (Big Finish, 2019)

=== Audio ===
- The Confessions Of Dorian Gray
  - The Houses In Between (2012)
- Blake's 7: The Liberator Chronicles
  - Epitaph (2013)
- THIRTEEN
  - Hidden Track (2013)
- Sometime Never (2014)
- Blake's 7: The Classic Adventures
  - Figurehead (2019)
- Bernice Summerfield: The Christmas Collection
  - Null Ziet (2020)

=== Film Essays ===
- "Stepping Over The Line" (2018), in Powerhouse Films' The Border blu-ray release
- "Fear Factor: The Anatomy of a 1970s Thriller" (2018), in 101 Films' Rollercoaster blu-ray release
- "Heaven & Hell: The Cooler and Hollywood's Vegas" (2018), in 101 Films' "The Cooler" blu-ray release
- "The Haunted Screen: Der Golem and the Ghosts of the Great War" (2019), in Eureka! Entertainment's "Der Golem" blu-ray release
- "Remixing the Future: Hackers, Skin-Jobs and Global Mind Control" (2019), in Second Sight Film's "Upgrade" blu-ray release
- "When the Machines Rock: Philip K. Dick and the Dystopian Dream" (2019), in 101 Films' "Screamers" blu-ray release
- "Monster Mash: Making Split Second" (2020), in 101 Films' "Split Second" blu-ray release
- "The Creature Feature: Movies with Bite" (2020), for Arrow Films
- "A Twisted History, Vipco, VHS and Spookies" (2018), in 101 Films' "Spookies" blu-ray release
- "Our Fears Made Manifest: Zombie Films in the 2000s" (2021), for Arrow Films
- "Rooms of the Mind" (2021), for Arrow Films
- "A Dish Best Served Cold" (2021), for Arrow Films
- "Fred Zinneman: Directing with Dignity" (2022), in the BFI's "The Men" blu-ray release

=== Short stories ===
- "The Wintermachine" (2010), in Twelve Days
- "Holding Pattern" (2011), in Faction Paradox: A Romance in Twelve Parts
- "The Chaos Exhibition" (2011), in Voices From The Past
- "The God Of All Machines" (2012), in Resurrection Engines
- "A Silence Between The Sounds" (2013), in Twisted Histories
- "The Last Train To Whitby" (2014), in Beside The Seaside

=== Comics ===
- "The Madness From The Sea" (2012), in Into The Woods: A Fairytale Anthology

=== Stage plays ===
- Eric (2003), (with Lee Harris)
- A Christmas Carol (2003 and 2010)
- The Strange Case Of Doctor Jekyll & Mr Hyde (2003)
- The Antipope (2004) (with Lee Harris)
- The Canterbury Tales (2004)
- Dracula (2004)

== Awards ==
- 2014, New York Festival Award, Best Drama: Sometime Never
- 2014, Audie Award, Best Original Work: Thirteen
