= Ellen Asher =

American science fiction editor

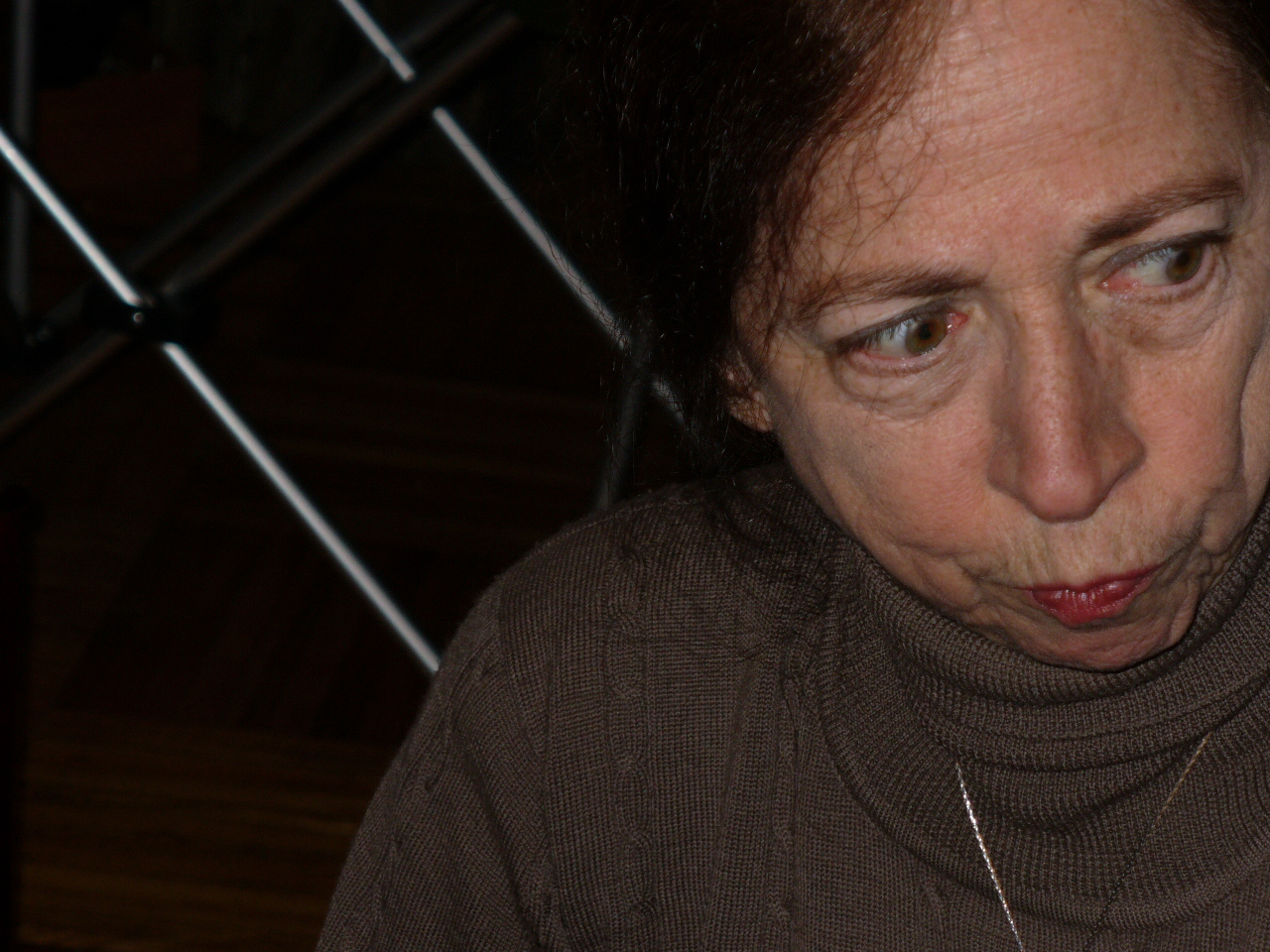
- Occupation: Editor
- Writing career
- Notable awards: Edward E. Smith Memorial Award for Imaginative Fiction, 2001; World Fantasy Award for Life Achievement, 2009

Ellen Asher is an American science fiction editor who served as editor-in-chief of the Science Fiction Book Club (SFBC) for thirty-four years, from February 8, 1973, through June 1, 2007. She grew up in New York City and began editing science fiction at New American Library from 1970 to 1972.

As editor-in-chief of the SFBC, she oversaw the publication of anthologies like The Dragon Quintet, Vampire Sextet, Fair Folk, and Masterpieces of Terror and the Supernatural. In 1984, Asher sat as a judge for the World Fantasy Awards. In 2001, Asher received the New England Science Fiction Association Edward E. Smith Memorial Award. In early 2007, the multinational media corporation, Bertelsmann, bought a controlling portion of Bookspan, of which the SFBC is an affiliate. In the subsequent restructuring, Asher was given an early retirement.

Asher received the World Fantasy Award for Life Achievement in 2009 and was a guest of honor at Renovation, the 69th World Science Fiction Convention. She occasionally performs some freelance work.
