= Ginjer Buchanan =

American novelist

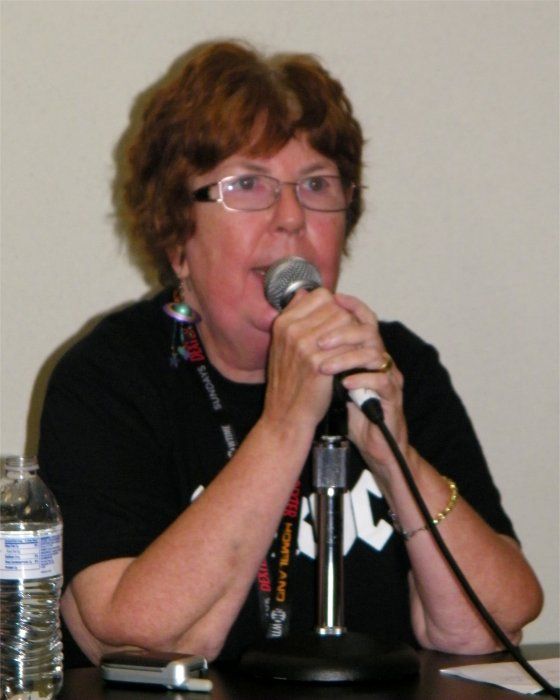
- Ginjer Buchanan, 2011
- Born: December 12, 1944 (age 81)
- Occupations: Editor, author

Ginjer Buchanan (born in Pittsburgh, December 12, 1944) was Editor-in-Chief at Ace Books and Roc Books, the two science fiction and fantasy imprints of Penguin Group (USA). She received a World Fantasy Award—Life Achievement in 2024. She was nominated six times for Hugo Award for Best Professional Editor for long form, winning in 2014. She received the Edward E. Smith Memorial Award in 2013 for her contributions to science fiction. She was awarded a 2012 Solstice Award (since renamed the Kate Wilhem Solstice Award) by the SFWA.

== Overview ==
Buchanan began working at Ace in 1984. She was promoted to Senior Editor in 1987, Executive Editor in 1994, then Senior Executive Editor and Marketing Director in 1996. She retired in March 2014.

She was a Guest of Honor at OryCon in 2008, Foolscap in 2000, and ArmadilloCon in 1988, and was Toastmaster at the World Fantasy Convention in 1989. She was selected to judge the World Fantasy Awards in 1984 and the Endeavour Award (for best book by a Pacific Northwest writer) in 2017.

Buchanan occasionally writes fiction. Her published work includes three short stories in the anthologies Alternate Kennedys (her story "The End of the Summer by the Great Sea" was included in the anthology), Whatdunnits II, and By Any Other Fame, all edited by Mike Resnick, and also the novel White Silence (1999), a Highlander tie-in. Prior to her career in publishing, she was a social worker and member of the science fiction fandom.
