= Susan Allison =

American editor and publishing executive

Susan Allison is an American editor and publishing executive who served as editor-in-chief and vice president at the Ace Books and Berkley Books imprints, part of the Penguin Group (USA) publishing company. In 1984, she published William Gibson’s first novel, Neuromancer, and Guy Gavriel Kay's first novel, The Summer Tree. Both of these authors are still edited by her, now for Penguin Random House. Her authors also include bestselling author Laurell K. Hamilton and Lee Smith. She became editor-in-chief in 1982, and was made a vice-president in 1985. She was a guest of honor of the 1990 World Fantasy Convention.

She is credited on the National Advisory Board for Poetry for Students; Volume 23. She is described as being a head librarian for the Lewiston Highschool, as well as a standards committee chairperson for the Maine School Library Programs.

On May 13, 2015, Allison announced her retirement effective 1 July, after 33 years at the company and more than 40 years in publishing.
