= Liz Gorinsky =

Hugo-award-winning editor and publisher

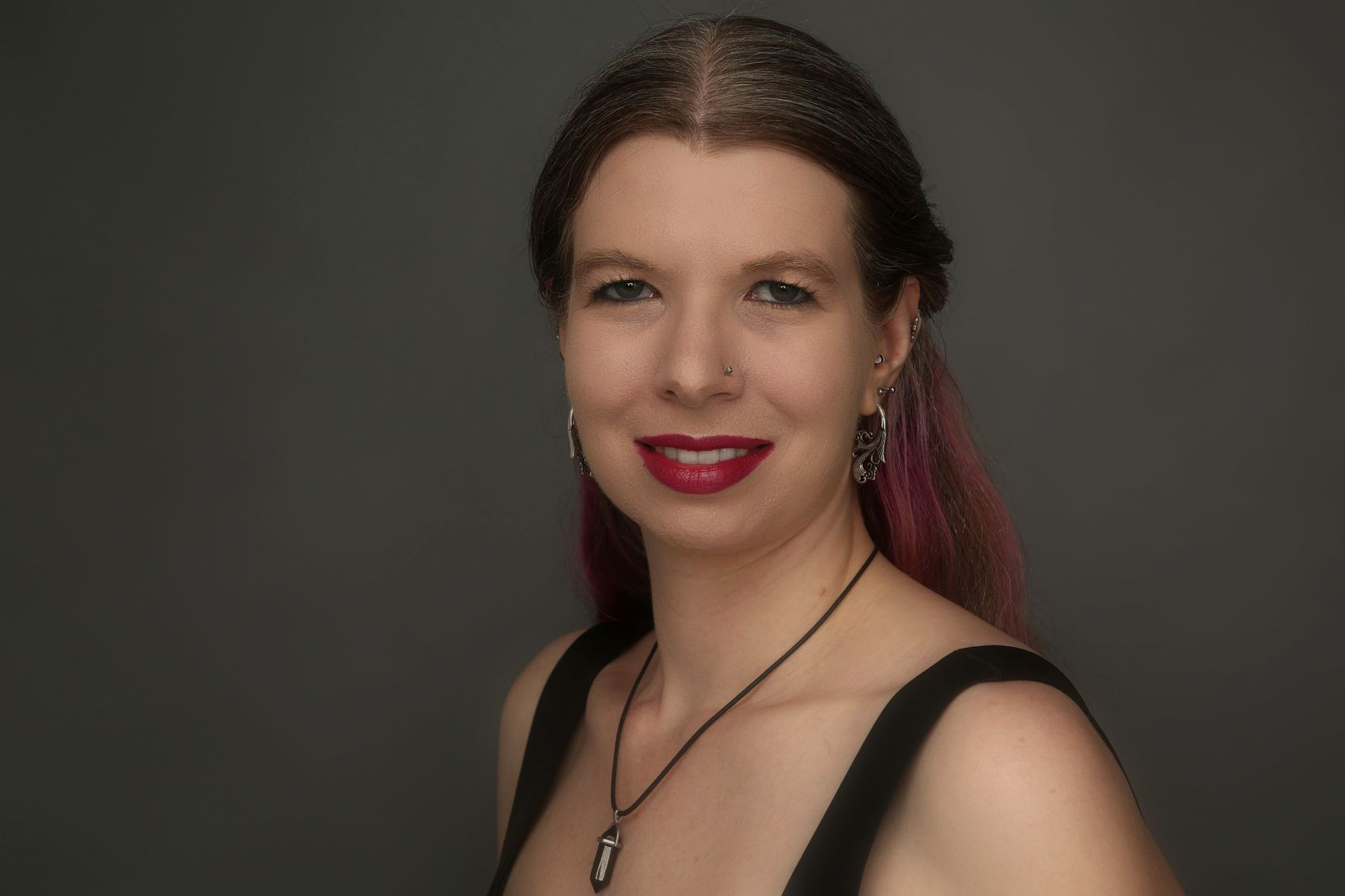
- Occupation: Editor
- Writing career
- Genres: Science fiction, fantasy, horror
- Website: lizgorinsky.com

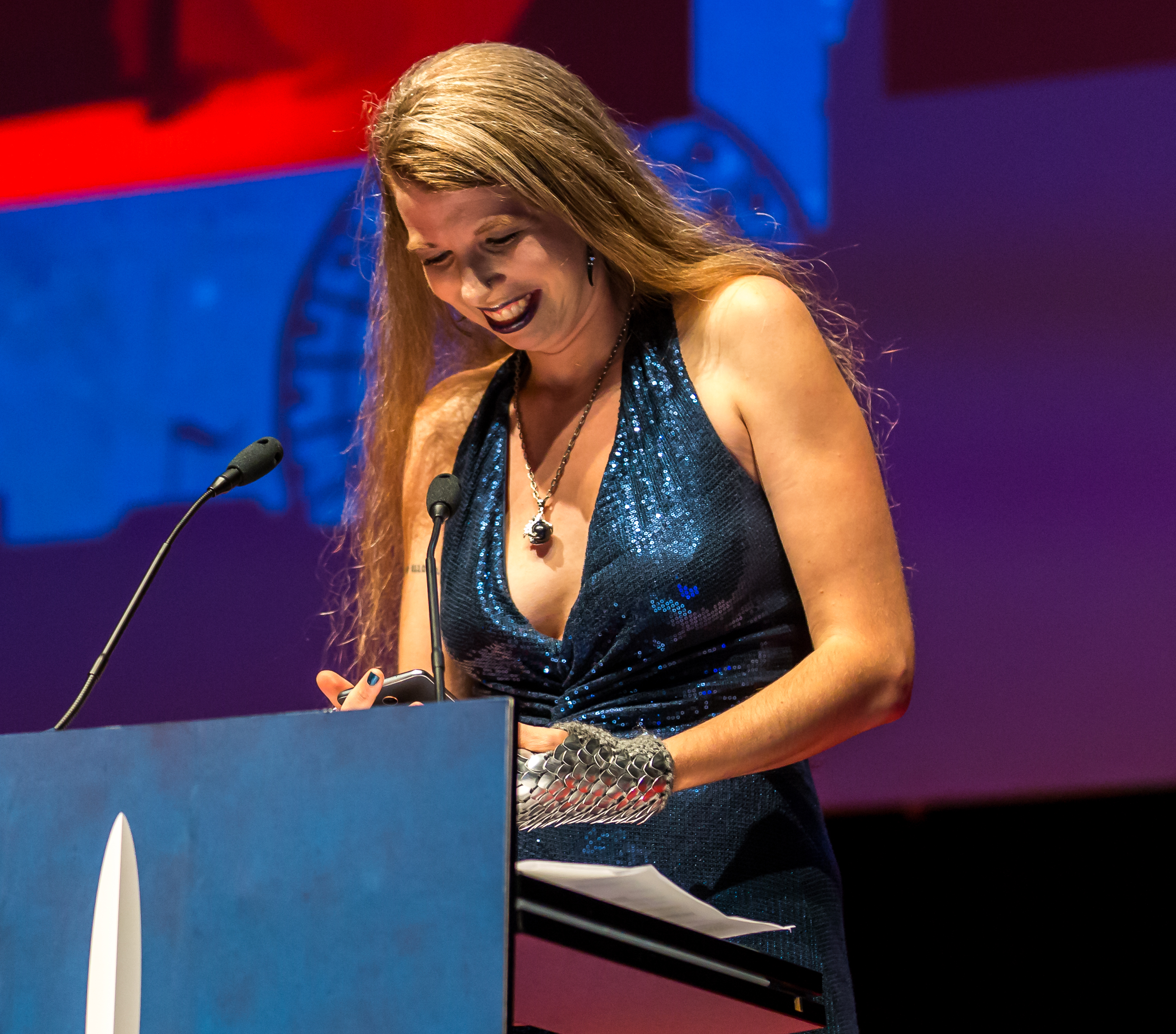
Liz Gorinsky accepting the Hugo Award, 2017

Liz Gorinsky is a publisher and editor of speculative fiction, founder and former publisher of Erewhon Books, a former editor for Tor Books, multiple Hugo Award nominee, and 2017 Hugo Award winner in the category of Best Editor (Long Form).

== Biography ==
Gorinsky is a native of Manhattan. She studied English, psychology and computer science at Columbia College, serving three years as president of the Columbia University Science Fiction Society.

She interned at DC Comics and Tor Books before joining the editorial staff of the latter, assisting editors including Ellen Datlow, Jim Frenkel and Patrick Nielsen Hayden. In addition to print novels, while working at Tor she acquired and edited short fiction for Tor Books's online short fiction market, Tor.com.

In 2018, Gorinsky left Tor to found an independent speculative fiction publishing company, Erewhon Books.

In 2022, Gorinsky left Erewhon to "pursue other projects."

== Awards and nominations ==
Gorinsky was first Hugo nominated for Best Editor (Long Form) in 2010, technically prior to her promotion to full editor at Tor Books. Gorinsky was nominated again in the same category in 2011, 2012, 2013, 2014, 2016, and 2017, winning in 2017. She is a winner of the 2015 George R. R. Martin–awarded "Alfie" award in the category of Best Editor, Long Form.

== Authors and works ==
- Some of the Best of Tor.com (2012)
- Some of the Best from Tor.com: 2012 edition (2013)
- Fred Chao
- Dave Duncan
- Felix Gilman
- Mary Robinette Kowal
- George Mann
- Cherie Priest
- Lev A. C. Rosen
- Pamela Sargent
- Brian Francis Slattery
- Catherynne M. Valente
- Jeff VanderMeer
