= Judy-Lynn del Rey =

Science fiction editor (1943–1986)

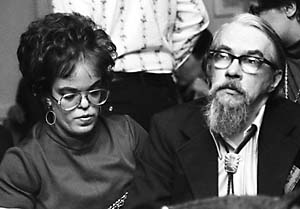
Judy-Lynn and Lester Del Rey at Minicon 8 in 1974

Judy-Lynn del Rey (née Benjamin; January 26, 1943 – February 20, 1986) was a science fiction editor.

Judy-Lynn was a fan and regular attendee at science fiction conventions. She also worked her way up the publishing ladder, starting with work at the science fiction magazine Galaxy. She was Managing Editor of Galaxy magazine from July 1969 until July 1971, whilst also working on If magazine.

Judy-Lynn was a friend of Lester del Rey, marrying him on March 21, 1971, after the death of his third wife. After moving to Ballantine Books, she revitalized the publisher's once-prominent science fiction line, and soon after brought in Lester to edit Ballantine's fantasy line. With their success, she was given her own imprint, called Del Rey Books. She also edited an original science fiction anthology series, Stellar, one of which, Stellar #2, won the Locus Award for "Best Anthology" in 1976. As an editor, she was known for her rapport with authors. Philip K. Dick called her a "master craftsman" and "the best editor I've ever worked with", and Isaac Asimov described her as "incredibly intelligent, quick-witted, hard-driving" and "generally recognised (especially by me) as one of the top editors in the business". She was also instrumental in obtaining the rights to publish novels based on George Lucas's then-unreleased movie Star Wars, which would earn Ballantine/Del Rey several million dollars.

Judy-Lynn Del Rey was born with dwarfism.

She suffered a brain hemorrhage in October 1985 and died several months later. In 1986, she was posthumously awarded the Hugo Award for Best Professional Editor. However, Lester del Rey declined the award in her name, saying that she would have objected to the award being given to her just because she had recently died.

On October 1, 2024, PBS premiered a documentary about her, Judy-Lynn del Rey: The Galaxy Gal, which also aired as an episode of the 2021 television series Renegades.
