= Beth Meacham =

American writer and editor (born 1951)

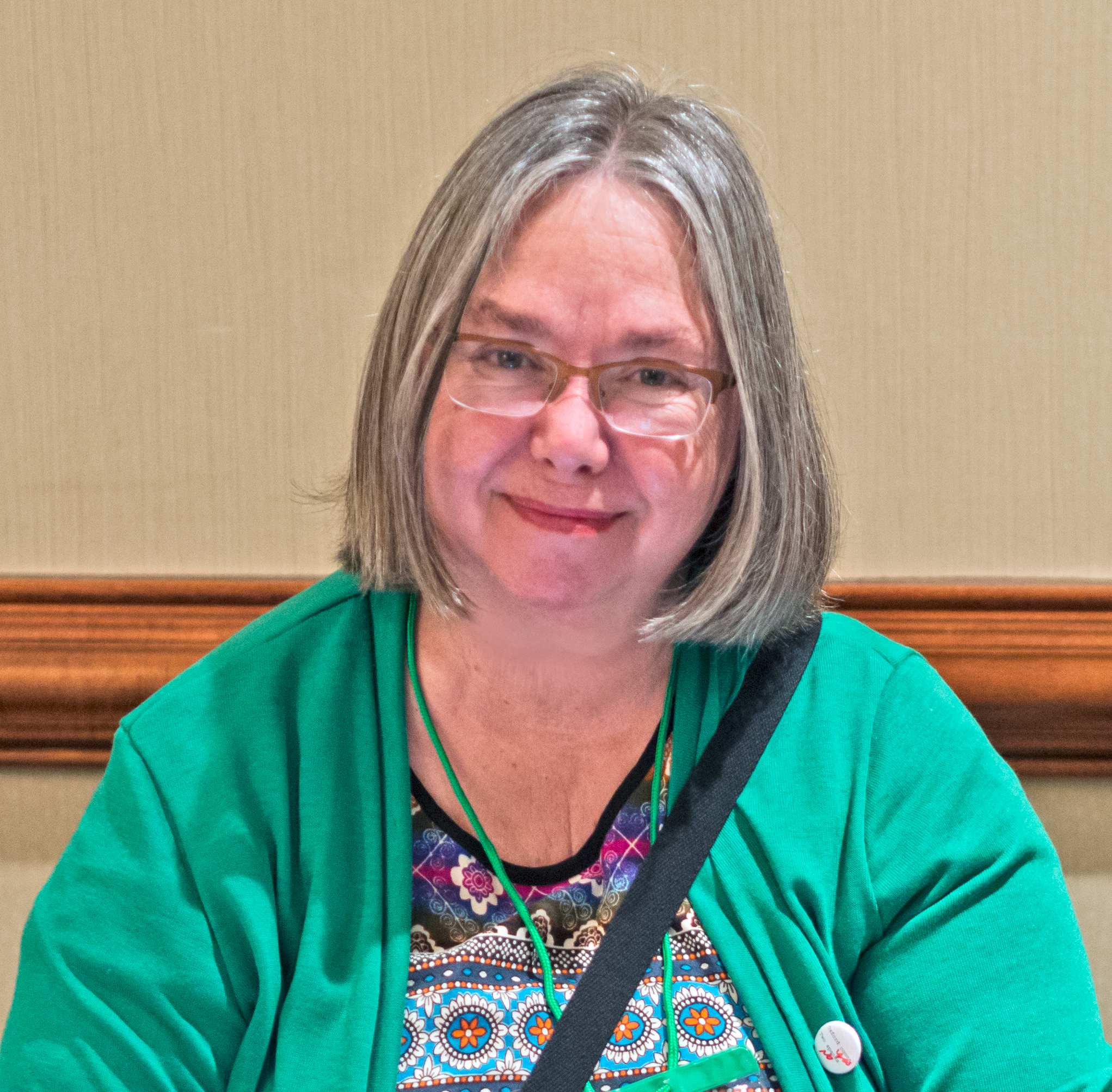
- Meacham in 2016
- Born: November 14, 1951; Newark, Ohio
- Occupations: Editor, author
- Writing career
- Genre: Science fiction

Beth Meacham (born 1951) is an American writer and editor, best known as a longtime top editor with Tor Books.

== Life, education and family ==
Meacham was born November 14, 1951, in Newark, Licking County, Ohio. She studied Communications in Antioch College in Yellow Springs, Ohio, where she met her husband, Tappan King. They were married in 1978, and in 1980 bought a house on Staten Island, which they spent eight years rehabilitating. Due to Meacham's severe arthritis, they relocated to the drier Southwest in 1989. They lived in northeast Tucson, Arizona for 14 years before settling on a 4-acre (16,000 m^{2}) ranch south of Tucson close to the village of Corona de Tucson. They keep cats and horses.

== Literary career ==
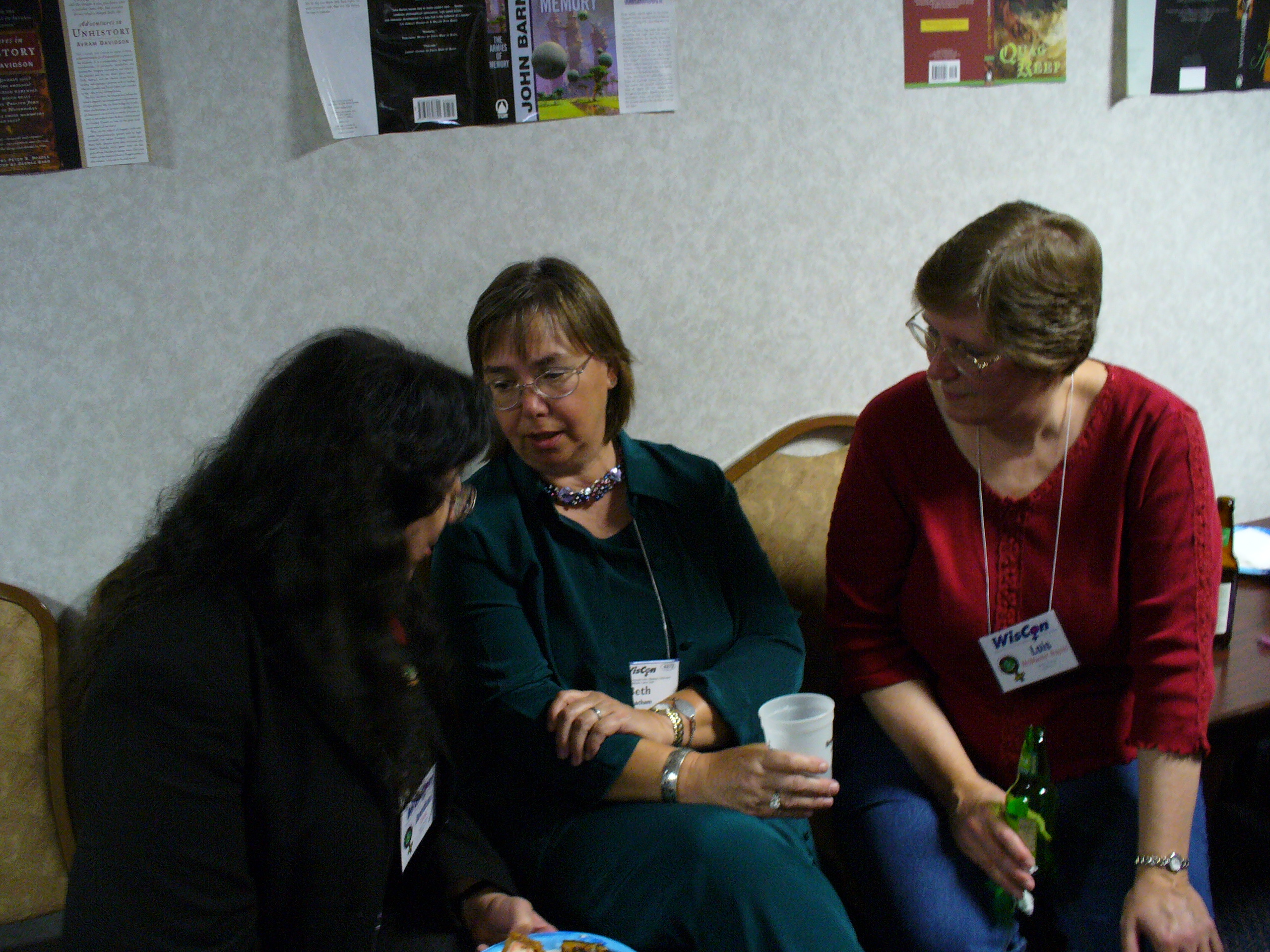
Beth Meacham (center), with Avedon Carol and Lois McMaster Bujold at Wiscon in 2006

Meacham has written one novel with Tappan King, Nightshade (1976, Pyramid), in addition to a number of short stories on her own. After a stint as a travel coordinator in New York after college, she worked at the Science Fiction Shop bookstore for two years in the late 1970s. In the late 1970s and early 1980s she and her husband were regular reviewers for Baird Searles' and Martin Last's SF Review Monthly. She was an editorial assistant at Ace Books from 1981 to 1983, and an editor beginning in 1978, then joined Ace in 1981 as an editorial assistant. In 1984 she became an editor for Tor Books, where she rose to the position of editor-in-chief. After her 1989 move west, Meacham continued working for Tor long distance as an executive editor. Among the major books she has edited she cites Greg Bear's Blood Music, Orson Scott Card's Ender's Game, Pat Murphy's The Falling Woman and Tim Powers's The Anubis Gates.

In February 2017 Beth was the Editor Guest of Honor and Keynote Speaker at the 35th annual Life, the Universe, & Everything professional science fiction and fantasy arts symposium.

== Bibliography ==
=== Novels ===
- Nightshade (with Tappan King) (1976)

=== Short stories ===
- "The Tale of Ali the Camel Driver" (1992)
- "One By One" (1993) (collected in Mike Resnick's alternate history anthology Alternate Warriors)
- "Ashes to Ashes" (1993)
- "On Tiptoe" (1993)
- "A Dream Can Make a Difference" (1994)
- "A Spark in the Darkness" (1994) (collected in Mike Resnick's alternate history anthology Alternate Outlaws)
- "Glamour Profession" (1995)
- "Coyote" (1996)

=== Anthologies edited ===
- Terry's Universe (1988)

=== Nonfiction ===
- A Reader's Guide to Science Fiction (with Baird Searles, Martin Last and Michael Franklin) (Harpercollins, 1979, ISBN 0-380-46128-5)
- A Reader's Guide to Fantasy (with Michael Franklin and Baird Searles) (Harpercollins, 1982, ISBN 0-380-80333-X)
- Barlowe's Guide to Extraterrestrials (with Wayne Barlowe) (1979)
- DiFate's Catalog of Science Fiction Hardware (with Vincent DiFate) (1980)
- Barlowe's Guide to Extraterrestrials (2nd ed.) (with Wayne Barlowe and Ian Summers) (Workman 1987, ISBN 0-89480-500-2)
