= 70th World Science Fiction Convention =

Chicon 7, the 70th World Science Fiction Convention
- Chicon 7 logo
- Genre: Science fiction
- Dates: 30 August–3 September 2012
- Venue: Hyatt Regency Chicago
- Location: Chicago, Illinois
- Country: United States
- Attendance: 4,628+
- Organizer: Chicago Worldcon Bid
- Filing status: 501(c)(3) non-profit
- Website: chicon.org

The 70th World Science Fiction Convention (Worldcon), also known as Chicon 7, was held on 30 August–3 September 2012 at the Hyatt Regency Chicago in Chicago, Illinois, United States.

The convention committee was chaired by Dave McCarty and organized under the auspices of the Chicago Worldcon Bid corporation.

== Participants ==
Attendance was 4,628.

=== Guests of honor ===
- author Mike Resnick
- artist Rowena Morrill (absent due to illness)
- astronaut Story Musgrave
- fan Peggy Rae Sapienza
- agent guest Jane Frank
- Sy Liebergot (Special Guest)
- John Scalzi (toastmaster)

== Awards ==
The World Science Fiction Society administers and presents the Hugo Awards, the oldest and most noteworthy award for science fiction. Selection of the recipients is by vote of the Worldcon members. Categories include novels and short fiction, artwork, dramatic presentations, and various professional and fandom activities.

Other awards may be presented at Worldcon at the discretion of the individual convention committee. This has often included the national SF awards of the host country, such as the Japanese Seiun Awards as part of Nippon 2007, and the Prix Aurora Awards as part of Anticipation in 2009. The Astounding Award for Best New Writer and the Sidewise Award, though not sponsored by the Worldcon, are usually presented, as well as the Chesley Awards, the Prometheus Award, and others. In 2021, the Nommo Awards began presenting at Worldcon.

=== 2012 Hugo Awards ===
The results were based on the 1,922 ballots submitted by members of the World Science Fiction Society. This was the second-highest total number of ballots ever cast for the Hugo. The unique base design for this year's Hugo Award trophies was designed by Deb Kosiba, designer of the trophy bases for both the 2005 and 2006 Hugo Awards. This was the first year for the new Best Fancast category, separating podcasts from more traditional fanzines.

- Best Novel: Among Others by Jo Walton (Tor Books)
- Best Novella: "The Man Who Bridged the Mist" by Kij Johnson (September/October 2011 Asimov's)
- Best Novelette: "Six Months, Three Days" by Charlie Jane Anders (Tor.com)
- Best Short Story: "The Paper Menagerie" by Ken Liu (March/April 2011 Fantasy & Science Fiction)
- Best Related Work: The Encyclopedia of Science Fiction, Third Edition by John Clute, David Langford, Peter Nicholls, and Graham Sleight (Victor Gollancz Ltd)
- Best Graphic Story: Digger, Ursula Vernon (writer, artist) (Sofawolf Press)
- Best Dramatic Presentation, Long Form: Game of Thrones (Season One), David Benioff (creator) D. B. Weiss (creator), multiple directors and writers (HBO)
- Best Dramatic Presentation, Short Form: Doctor Who, "The Doctor's Wife", screenplay by Neil Gaiman, directed by Richard Clark (BBC Cymru Wales)
- Best Professional Editor, Long Form: Betsy Wollheim (DAW Books)
- Best Professional Editor, Short Form: Sheila Williams (Asimov's Science Fiction)
- Best Professional Artist: John Picacio
- Best Semiprozine: Locus, edited by Liza Groen Trombi and Kirsten Gong-Wong
- Best Fanzine: SF Signal, edited by John DeNardo
- Best Fancast: SF Squeecast, by Lynne M. Thomas, Seanan McGuire, Paul Cornell, Elizabeth Bear, and Catherynne M. Valente
- Best Fan Writer: Jim C. Hines
- Best Fan Artist: Maurine Starkey

The Hugo Awards ceremony was intended to be webcast live via Ustream, but automatic routines on the site mistook brief film clips from the dramatic presentation categories as copyright infringement, even though they had been provided by NBC and the BBC. The stream was terminated in the middle of Neil Gaiman's acceptance speech and Worldcon temporarily banned as a user on the site.

=== Other awards ===
Special awards presentations at Chicon 7 included the Chesley Awards for artistic excellence.

- Big Heart Award: Juanita Coulson
- Special Committee Award: Robert Weinberg
- John W. Campbell Award for Best New Writer: E. Lily Yu

== Site selection ==
=== The bid ===
The "Chicago in 2012" bid committee issued a series of ten short magazines, called bidzines, each featuring a story by a different Chicago-related author, such as Frederik Pohl, Jody Lynn Nye, Phyllis Eisenstein, and Mike Resnick. Each story was approximately 2,000 words and additional stories by other Chicago authors, including Richard Garfinkle and Lois Tilton, were published on the bid's website. "Cover" art was provided by noted artists such as Kaja Foglio and Frank Wu.

The bid also did not sell supporting memberships as most Worldcon bids do, instead asking supporters to simply make a donation to help the bid. Supporters who donated at least $100 and voted in site selection automatically had their support converted to an attending membership.

=== Voting ===
Chicago's bid to host the Worldcon was formally unopposed and won in balloting among the members of the 68th World Science Fiction Convention held in Melbourne, Australia, in 2010. With only 526 ballots cast, this election had the lowest turnout since voting records began to be kept in 1974. The voting breakdown was 447 votes for Chicago, 20 ballots expressed no preference, and there were 59 write-in votes for various sites.

=== Future site selection ===
Chicon 7 members overwhelmingly selected the formally unopposed "London in 2014" bid to host the 72nd World Science Fiction Convention in August 2014.

== See also ==
- Hugo Award
- Science fiction
- Speculative fiction
- World Science Fiction Society
- Worldcon

Preceded by 69th World Science Fiction Convention; Renovation in Reno, Nevada, United States (2011)	List of Worldcons; 70th World Science Fiction Convention; Chicon 7 in Chicago, Illinois, United States (2012)	Succeeded by 71st World Science Fiction Convention; LoneStarCon 3 in San Antonio, Texas, United States (2013)
