= 71st World Science Fiction Convention =

71st Worldcon (2013)

LoneStarCon 3, the 71st World Science Fiction Convention
- Logo by Brad Foster
- Status: Active
- Genre: Science fiction
- Dates: 29 August–2 September 2013
- Venue: Henry B. Gonzalez Convention Center / Marriott Rivercenter
- Location: San Antonio, Texas
- Country: United States
- Attendance: 4,311
- Organizer: Alamo Literary Arts Maintenance Organization, Inc.
- Filing status: 501(c)(3) non-profit
- Website: lonestarcon3.org

The 71st World Science Fiction Convention (Worldcon), also known as LoneStarCon 3, was held on 29 August–2 September 2013 at the Henry B. Gonzalez Convention Center and Marriott Rivercenter in San Antonio, Texas, United States.

The convention committee was chaired by Randall Shepherd. The convention was organized by Alamo Literary Arts Maintenance Organization, Inc. (ALAMO) which had previously organized LoneStarCon 2, the 55th World Science Fiction Convention, held in San Antonio in 1997.

== Participants ==
Attendance was 4,311.

=== Guests of honor ===
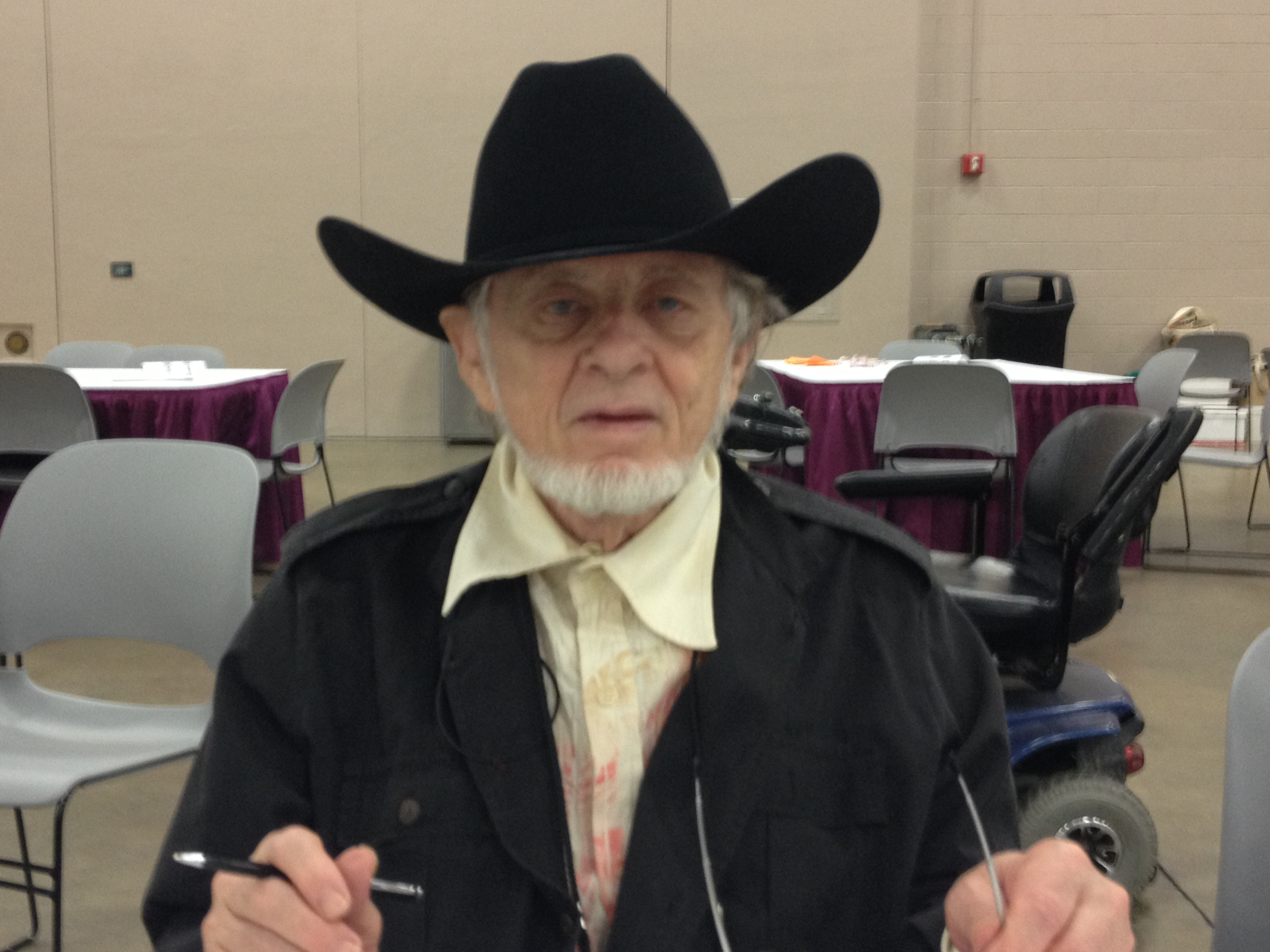
Author Norman Spinrad at LoneStarCon 3.

- Editor: Ellen Datlow
- Author: James Gunn
- Author: Norman Spinrad
- Artist: Darrell K. Sweet
  (deceased in December 2011)
- Fan: Willie Siros
- Toastmaster: Paul Cornell
- Musician Leslie Fish (special guest)
- Author: Joe R. Lansdale (special guest)

=== Other program participants ===
The convention's several hundred program participants included authors Lois McMaster Bujold, George R.R. Martin, Jo Walton, Howard Waldrop, and Bradley Denton plus artists John Picacio, Vincent Villafranca, and NASA astronaut Cady Coleman.

== Programming and events ==
Programming included hundreds of panels, screenings, concerts, signings, meetings, and other events on topics including women in aerospace, Doctor Who, molecular gastronomy, the Vatican library, the histories of both science fiction and its fandom, plus readings of current work by attending authors. More than a dozen panels focused on Texas and its role in speculative fiction plus nearly as many on the life and work of author Robert E. Howard.

=== Masquerade ===
The LoneStarCon3 masquerade was held on Friday, 31 August with 29 entrants. The masquerade director was Jill Eastlake and the master of ceremonies was Paul Cornell. The judges were John O'Halloran, Pierre Pettinger and Sandy Pettinger for performance; and John Hertz and Michele Weinstein for workmanship.

The winners, across four experience-based categories, were:

==== Young Fan division ====
Workmanship awards:

- Best Leatherwork: "Lady Lattitude" and "Wingnut" by Robyn Facile, Lillian Facile and Steward Facile
- Best Sewing and Applique: "Kirby Pikachu" by Candace Pohle

Performance awards:

- Most Royal: "Medieval Princesses" by Emma Jackson and Hope Jackson
- Best Story: "Ni no Kuni" by Niki Hyatt, Micah Joel Hyatt, Tori Hyatt, and Malachi Hyatt
- Best Recreation: "Kirby Pikachu" by Candace Pohler
- Most Beautiful: "Lady Lattitude" by Robyn Facile
- Best in Class: "Wingnut" by Lillian Facile

==== Novice division ====
Workmanship awards:

- Best Construction of Fur Suit Heads: "Project F-Zero-X" by Jay Brandt
- Most Ingenious Use of Mundane Substance: "AirProof" (balloon modelling) by Don Clary
- Best Entry Made on Site: "AirProof" (balloon modelling) by Don Clary
- Best Additions and Alterations: "Emmaleen and her Flying Machine" by Sharon Bass and Barb Galler-Smith
- Best Use of Found Objects: "Her Majesty Jadis, Empress of Charm and Queen of Narnia" by S. Kay Nash

Performance awards:

- Honorable Mention for Presentation: "Emmaleen and her Flying Machine" by Sharon Bass and Barb Galler-Smith
- Honorable Mention for Chaos: "Randomly Generated Character" by Tamisan
- Dr. Moreau Award: "Project F-Zero-X" by Jay Brandt and Victoria Brandt
- Deep in the Heart of Texas Award: "AirProof" (balloon modelling) by Don Clary and James Cossaboon
- Great Balloons of Fire Award: "AirProof" (balloon modelling) by Don Clary and James Cossaboon
- Best in Class: "Daenerys Targaryen" by Andrea Morrison

==== Journeyman division ====
Workmanship awards:

- Best Arrangement of Transformation: "A Crack in Time and Space" (TARDIS) by Sabine Furlong
- Best Engineering: "Stinza Nickerson, Half-Horse" by Wendy Snyder
- Best in Class: "Beren and Luthien" by Lorretta Morgan

Performance awards:

- Best Transformation: "A Crack in Time and Space" (TARDIS) by Sabine Furlong
- Most Beautiful: "The Dragon Lady" by April Korbel
- Best in Class: "Beren and Luthien" by Tim Morgan and Lorretta Morgan

==== Master division ====
Workmanship awards:

- Best Hand Painting: "TARDIS in Vortex" by Steward Facile
- Best in Class: "Saucer Country" by Kevin Roche, Andrew Trembley, Julie Zetterberg, Greg Sardo, Jerry Majors Patterson, Ken Patterson, Chuck Serface, and Nova Mellow as "Daisy"

Performance awards:

- Most Humorous: "Public Service Announcement" (Star Trek) by Rebecca Hewett, Kevin Hewett, Serge Mailloux, and Janice Gelb
- Close Encounters of the Texas Kind Award: "Saucer Country" by Kevin Roche, Andrew Trembley, Julie Zetterberg, Greg Sardo, Jerry Majors Patterson, Ken Patterson, Chuck Serface, and Nova Mellow as "Daisy"
- Best in Class: "Saucer Country" by Kevin Roche, Andrew Trembley, Julie Zetterberg, Greg Sardo, Jerry Majors Patterson, Ken Patterson, Chuck Serface, and Nova Mellow as "Daisy"

==== Overall ====
- Judge's Choice Award: "Stinza Nickerson, Half-Horse" by Wendy Snyder
- Best in Show: "Otilia" (a character from the Girl Genius webcomic) by Aurora Celeste

== Awards ==
The World Science Fiction Society administers and presents the Hugo Awards, the oldest and most noteworthy award for science fiction. Selection of the recipients is by vote of the Worldcon members. Categories include novels and short fiction, artwork, dramatic presentations, and various professional and fandom activities.

Other awards may be presented at Worldcon at the discretion of the individual convention committee. This has often included the national SF awards of the host country, such as the Japanese Seiun Awards as part of Nippon 2007, and the Prix Aurora Awards as part of Anticipation in 2009. The Astounding Award for Best New Writer and the Sidewise Award, though not sponsored by the Worldcon, are usually presented, as well as the Chesley Awards, the Prometheus Award, and others. In 2021, the Nommo Awards began presenting at Worldcon.

=== 2013 Hugo Awards ===
The base for the 2013 Hugo trophy was cast in bronze by artist Vincent Villafranca and depicts an astronaut and several aliens reading books while seated around the globe on which the traditional Hugo Award rocket has landed.

The Hugo ceremony was hosted by toastmaster Paul Cornell in the Grand Ballroom of the Marriott Rivercenter in downtown San Antonio. Presentations included the Big Heart Award to Tom Veal by First Fandom, an in memoriam reel featuring music by Leslie Fish, and a comedy routine by author Robert Silverberg. The proceedings were broadcast in partnership with Ustream but technical issues on-site kept the entire ceremony from being broadcast live.

- Best Novel: Redshirts: A Novel with Three Codas by John Scalzi
- Best Novella: "The Emperor's Soul" by Brandon Sanderson
- Best Novelette: "The Girl-Thing Who Went Out for Sushi" by Pat Cadigan
- Best Short Story: "Mono no Aware" by Ken Liu
- Best Related Work: Writing Excuses Season Seven by Brandon Sanderson, Dan Wells, Mary Robinette Kowal, Howard Tayler, and Jordan Sanderson
- Best Graphic Story: Saga, Volume One, written by Brian K. Vaughan, illustrated by Fiona Staples
- Best Dramatic Presentation, Long Form: The Avengers, screenplay and directed by Joss Whedon
- Best Dramatic Presentation, Short Form: Game of Thrones, "Blackwater", written by George R.R. Martin, directed by Neil Marshall
- Best Professional Editor, Long Form: Patrick Nielsen Hayden
- Best Professional Editor, Short Form: Stanley Schmidt
- Best Professional Artist: John Picacio
- Best Semiprozine: Clarkesworld, edited by Neil Clarke, Jason Heller, Sean Wallace, and Kate Baker
- Best Fanzine: SF Signal, edited by John DeNardo, JP Frantz, and Patrick Hester
- Best Fan Writer: Tansy Rayner Roberts
- Best Fan Artist: Galen Dara
- Best Fancast: SF Squeecast, by Elizabeth Bear, Paul Cornell, Seanan McGuire, Lynne M. Thomas, Catherynne M. Valente (presenters), and David McHone-Chase (technical producer)

=== Other awards ===
- John W. Campbell Award for Best New Writer: Mur Lafferty
- First Fandom Big Heart Award: Tom Veal
- Rhysling Award, Long Poem: Into Flight by Andrew Robert Sutton
- Rhysling Award, Short Poem: "The Cat Star" by Terry A. Garey
- Sidewise Award for Alternate History, Long Form: C. J. Sansom, Dominion
- Sidewise Award for Alternate History, Short Form: Rick Wilber, "Something Real"

=== LoneStarCon 3 Film Festival ===
- Best SF&F Short Film: Ray Bradbury’s Kaleidoscope (USA), director: Eric Tozzi
- Best Animation Short Film: Oh Super (USA), director: Mike Roberts
- Best Horror Short Film: CARGOLS! (Snails) (Spain), director: Geoffrey Cowper
- Best Fan Film: Star Trek Continues: "Pilot - Pilgrim of Eternity" (USA), director: Vic Mignogna
- Best Feature Film: Chill (USA), directors: Noelle Bye and Meredith Holland

== Site selection ==
Committees who had announced bids to host the 2013 Worldcon included "Zagreb in 2013", "Texas in 2013" (San Antonio), and a hoax bid for "Minneapolis in 5773". Only "Texas in 2013" qualified to be on the official ballot. As such, Texas' bid to host the Worldcon was formally unopposed and won in balloting among members of Renovation, the 69th World Science Fiction Convention, held in Reno, Nevada, in August 2011. With 760 valid ballots cast, Texas received 694 votes beating out No Preference with 25 and None of the Above with 14. Write-in candidates included Xerpes with 6, Minneapolis with 5, Denton with 5, Boston with 3, and a number of single-vote entries.

=== Future site selection ===
==== 2015 Worldcon ====
Three committees announced bids and qualified to be on the site selection ballot for the 73rd World Science Fiction Convention: "Helsinki in 2015" to be held August 6–10, 2015, "Spokane in 2015" to be held August 19–23, 2015, and "Orlando in 2015" to be held September 2–6, 2015. The first contested Worldcon selection since the 2006 vote for the 2008 Worldcon site saw active campaigning and drew celebrity endorsements.

Spokane won the site selection contest on the third round of ballot counting in Australian-style preferential balloting. Spokane finished with 645 votes, gaining a majority over Helsinki with 610. Orlando was dropped in the second round with 307 votes and "none of the above" had been eliminated in the first round. Spokane's Worldcon is named "Sasquan".

==== 2014 NASFiC ====
Two committees announced bids and qualified to be on the site selection ballot for the 2014 North American Science Fiction Convention (NASFiC): "Detroit in 2014" to be held 17–20 July 2014, and "Phoenix in 2014" to be held 30 July–3 August 2014. Detroit's bid was certified as the winner with 231 votes over Phoenix with 210 votes. Detroit needed at least 223 votes to win in the first round, based on the total of 453 valid votes cast. Detroit's NASFiC is named "Detcon1".

== See also ==
- Hugo Award
- Science fiction
- Speculative fiction
- World Science Fiction Society
- Worldcon

Preceded by 70th World Science Fiction Convention; Chicon 7 in Chicago, Illinois, United States (2012)	List of Worldcons; 71st World Science Fiction Convention; LoneStarCon 3 in San Antonio, Texas, United States (2013)	Succeeded by 72nd World Science Fiction Convention; Loncon 3 in London, UK (2014)
