= 68th World Science Fiction Convention =

68th Worldcon (2010)

Aussiecon Four, the 68th World Science Fiction Convention
- Status: Active
- Genre: Science fiction
- Dates: 2–6 September 2010
- Venue: Melbourne Convention and Exhibition Centre
- Locations: Melbourne, Victoria
- Country: Australia
- Organizer: Victorian Science Fiction Conventions Inc.
- Filing status: Not for profit
- Website: aussiecon4.org.au

The 68th World Science Fiction Convention (Worldcon), also known as Aussiecon Four, was held on 2–6 September 2010 in the Melbourne Convention and Exhibition Centre in Melbourne, Victoria, Australia.

The co-chairs were Perry Middlemiss and Rose Mitchell.

== Participants ==
=== Guests of Honour ===
- Kim Stanley Robinson (author)
- Robin Johnson (fan)
- Shaun Tan (artist)

== Awards ==
The World Science Fiction Society administers and presents the Hugo Awards, the oldest and most noteworthy award for science fiction. Selection of the recipients is by vote of the Worldcon members. Categories include novels and short fiction, artwork, dramatic presentations, and various professional and fandom activities.

Other awards may be presented at Worldcon at the discretion of the individual convention committee. This has often included the national SF awards of the host country, such as the Japanese Seiun Awards as part of Nippon 2007, and the Prix Aurora Awards as part of Anticipation in 2009. The Astounding Award for Best New Writer and the Sidewise Award, though not sponsored by the Worldcon, are usually presented, as well as the Chesley Awards, the Prometheus Award, and others. In 2021, the Nommo Awards began presenting at Worldcon.

=== 2010 Hugo Awards ===
The 2010 Hugo Award statue base was designed by Nick Stathopoulos with laser etching by Lewis Morley and incorporating the Aussiecon 4 logo by Grant Gittus.

- Best Novel: (tie) The City & The City by China Miéville and The Windup Girl by Paolo Bacigalupi
- Best Novella: "Palimpsest" by Charles Stross
- Best Novelette: "The Island" by Peter Watts
- Best Short Story: "Bridesicle" by Will McIntosh
- Best Related Book: This is Me, Jack Vance! by Jack Vance
- Best Graphic Story: Girl Genius, Volume 9: Agatha Heterodyne and the Heirs of the Storm, written by Kaja and Phil Foglio, art by Phil Foglio, colours by Cheyenne Wright
- Best Dramatic Presentation, Long Form: Moon, screenplay by Nathan Parker; story by Duncan Jones; directed by Duncan Jones (Liberty Films)
- Best Dramatic Presentation, Short Form: Doctor Who "The Waters of Mars", written by Russell T Davies & Phil Ford; directed by Graeme Harper (BBC Wales)
- Best Professional Editor, Long Form: Patrick Nielsen Hayden
- Best Professional Editor, Short Form: Ellen Datlow
- Best Professional Artist: Shaun Tan
- Best Semiprozine: Clarkesworld, edited by Neil Clarke, Sean Wallace, and Cheryl Morgan
- Best Fan Writer: Frederik Pohl
- Best Fanzine: StarShipSofa, edited by Tony C. Smith
- Best Fan Artist: Brad W. Foster

=== Other awards ===
- John W. Campbell Award for Best New Writer: Seanan McGuire
- Aussiecon Four Make Ready Short Story Competition Award: Helen Stubbs

== Site selection ==
The location was selected by the members of Denvention 3.

=== Future site selection ===
The members of Aussiecon 4 selected Chicago, Illinois, as the host city for the 70th World Science Fiction Convention, Chicon 7, to be held in 2012 in an uncontested election. With only 526 ballots cast, this election had the lowest turnout since records began to be kept in 1974. The voting breakdown was 447 votes for Chicago, 20 ballots expressed no preference, and there were 59 write-in votes for various sites.

== See also ==
- Hugo Award
- Science fiction
- Speculative fiction
- World Science Fiction Society
- Worldcon

Preceded by 67th World Science Fiction Convention; Anticipation in Montréal, Québec, Canada (2009)	List of Worldcons; 68th World Science Fiction Convention; Aussiecon Four in Melbourne, Australia (2010)	Succeeded by 69th World Science Fiction Convention; Renovation in Reno, Nevada, United States (2011)
