= 63rd World Science Fiction Convention =

63rd Worldcon (2005)

Interaction, the 63rd World Science Fiction Convention
- Genre: Science fiction
- Dates: 4–8 August 2005
- Venue: SEC Centre
- Location: Glasgow
- Country: United Kingdom
- Attendance: 4,115
- Organizer: UK 2005 Ltd.
- Website: worldcon.org.uk/interaction

The 63rd World Science Fiction Convention (Worldcon), also known as Interaction, was held on 4–8 August 2005 at the SEC Centre with the attached SEC Armadillo and Moat House Hotel in Glasgow, United Kingdom. Parties took place at the Hilton Hotel.

The organising committee was co-chaired by Colin Harris and Vincent Docherty.

This convention was also the 2005 Eurocon.

== Participants ==
Attendance was 4,115, out of 5,202 paid memberships. The members represented 35 different nationalities, of which the largest contingents were from the United States and the United Kingdom.

=== Guests of Honour ===
- Greg Pickersgill
- Christopher Priest
- Robert Sheckley
- Lars-Olov Strandberg
- Jane Yolen

=== Special guests ===
- Alan Lee
- Professor David Southwood

=== Participating writers and artists ===
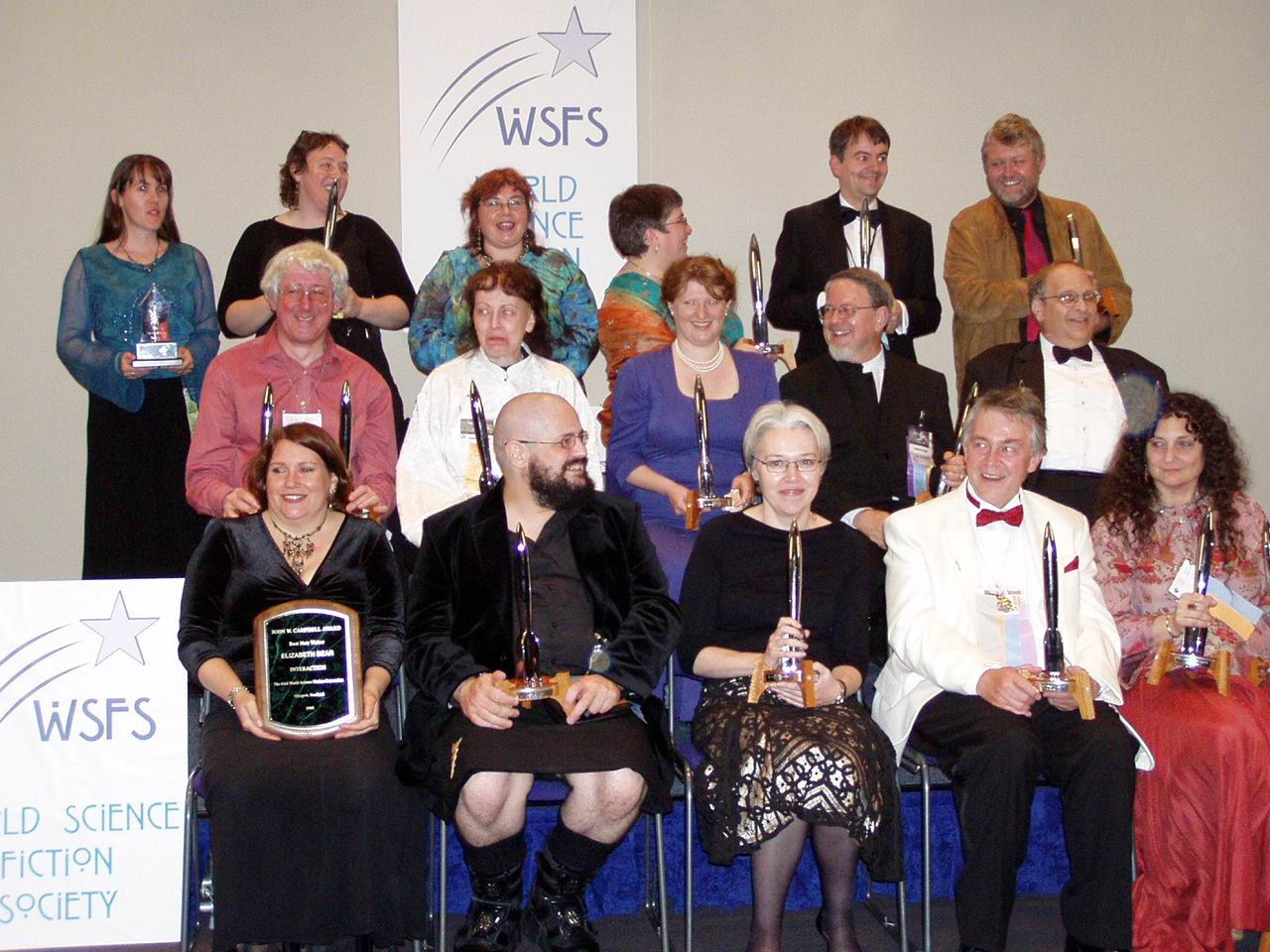
Hugo 2005 winners

In addition to the guests of honour, notable participating science fiction and fantasy writers and artists included:

Brian Aldiss
Iain M. Banks
Stephen Baxter
Terry Brooks
Jim Burns
Susanna Clarke
Jonathan Clements
John Clute
Cory Doctorow
Greer Gilman
Simon Green
Joe Haldeman
Peter F. Hamilton
Harry Harrison

Robin Hobb
P. C. Hodgell
James P. Hogan
Tanya Huff
Conor Kostick
Ellen Kushner
Alan Lee
Anne McCaffrey
Ian McDonald
Ken MacLeod
George R. R. Martin
China Miéville
Elizabeth Moon

Richard Morgan
John Picacio
Terry Pratchett
Robert Rankin
Alastair Reynolds
Justina Robson
Kim Stanley Robinson
Delia Sherman
Robert Silverberg
Michael Swanwick
Harry Turtledove
Connie Willis
Frank Wu

== Awards ==
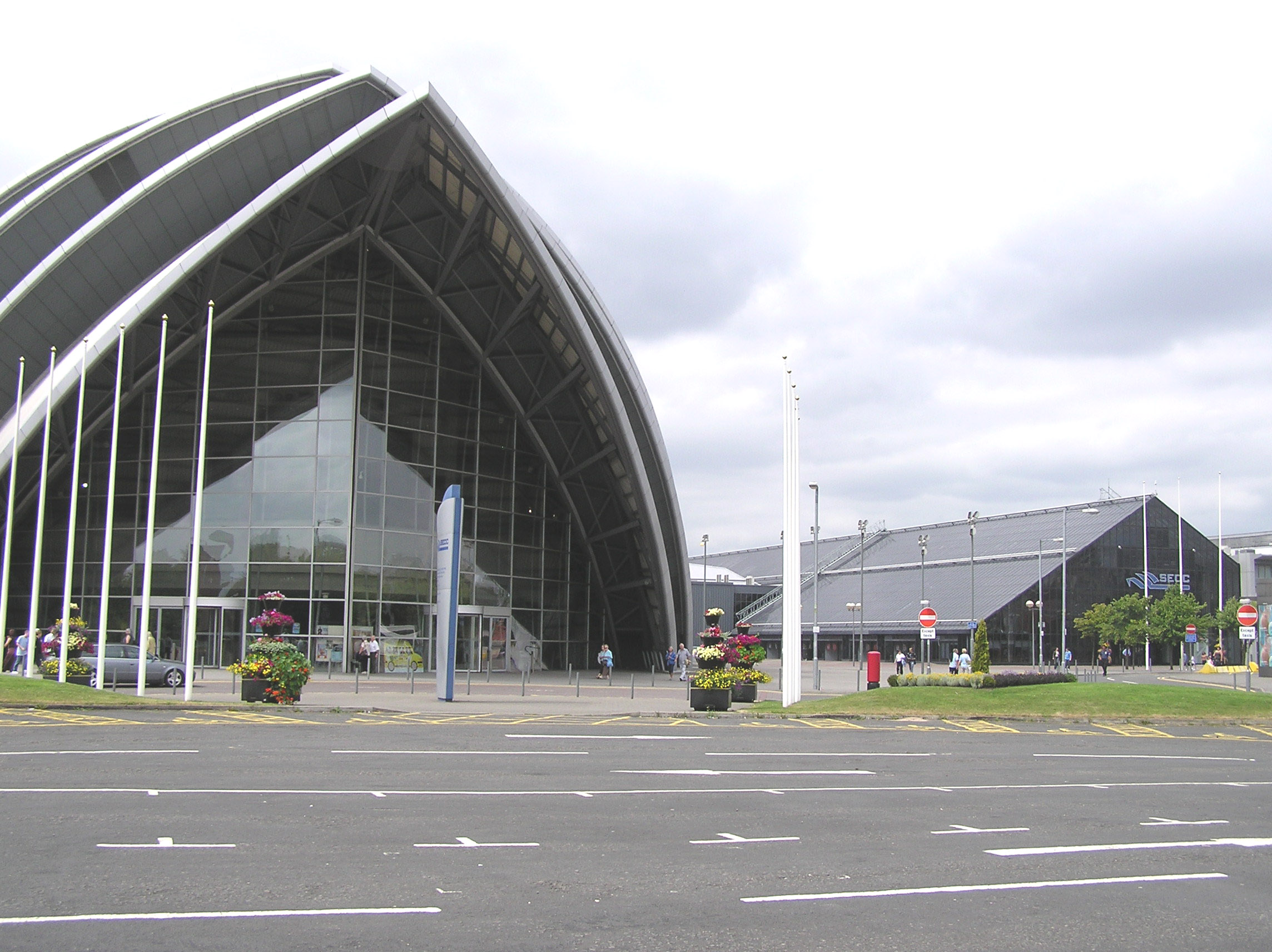
The SEC Armadillo with the main SEC Centre building behind it

The World Science Fiction Society administers and presents the Hugo Awards, the oldest and most noteworthy award for science fiction. Selection of the recipients is by vote of the Worldcon members. Categories include novels and short fiction, artwork, dramatic presentations, and various professional and fandom activities.

Other awards may be presented at Worldcon at the discretion of the individual convention committee. This has often included the national SF awards of the host country, such as the Japanese Seiun Awards as part of Nippon 2007, and the Prix Aurora Awards as part of Anticipation in 2009. The Astounding Award for Best New Writer and the Sidewise Award, though not sponsored by the Worldcon, are usually presented, as well as the Chesley Awards, the Prometheus Award, and others. In 2021, the Nommo Awards began presenting at Worldcon.

=== 2005 Hugo Awards ===
- Best Novel: Jonathan Strange & Mr Norrell by Susanna Clarke
- Best Novella: The Concrete Jungle by Charles Stross
- Best Novelette: "The Faery Handbag" by Kelly Link
- Best Short Story: "Travels with My Cats" by Mike Resnick
- Best Related Book: The Cambridge Companion to Science Fiction, edited by Edward James and Farah Mendlesohn
- Best Dramatic Presentation, Long Form: The Incredibles, written & directed by Brad Bird
- Best Dramatic Presentation, Short Form: "33", Battlestar Galactica
- Best Professional Editor: Ellen Datlow
- Best Professional Artist: Jim Burns
- Best Semiprozine: Ansible, edited by David Langford
- Best Fanzine: Plokta, edited by Alison Scott, Steve Davies and Mike Scott
- Best Fan Writer: David Langford
- Best Fan Artist: Sue Mason
- Best Website: SciFiction (SciFiction), edited by Ellen Datlow. general manager Craig Engler

=== Other awards ===
- John W. Campbell Award for Best New Writer: Elizabeth Bear
- Special Interaction Committee Award: David Pringle
- Eurocon Awards – Best European Magazine: Galaktika

== Future site selection ==
Due to the changes in the World Science Fiction Society rules, which reduced the lead time from three to two years, no Worldcon site selection took place at this convention. The site for the 2007 Worldcon was decided at the 2004 Worldcon in Boston under the old three year lead-time rule. The site selection for the 2008 Worldcon, the first under the new two year lead-time rule, took place at the 2006 Worldcon in Anaheim.

== See also ==
- Hugo Award
- Science fiction
- Speculative fiction
- World Science Fiction Society
- Worldcon

Preceded by 62nd World Science Fiction Convention; Noreascon 4 in Boston, Massachusetts, United States (2004)	List of Worldcons; 63rd World Science Fiction Convention; Interaction in Glasgow, UK (2005)	Succeeded by 64th World Science Fiction Convention; L.A.con IV in Anaheim, California, United States (2006)
