= Verity! =

Podcast about Doctor Who (2013-2026)

- Genre: Entertainment
- Language: English

Cast and voices
- Hosted by: Erika Ensign, Katrina Griffiths, L.M. Myles, Tansy Rayner Roberts, Deborah Stanish, Lynne M. Thomas

Production
- Length: Every other show was an hour long. The "Extras" were between 20 and 40 minutes. Apart from when they weren't.

Technical specifications
- Audio format: MP3

Publication
- Original release: January 1, 2013 – August 5, 2026

Related
- Website: http://www.veritypodcast.com/

Verity! was a weekly podcast about the television show Doctor Who, as seen through the eyes of a rotating cast of six women, running from January 2013 to August 2026. Verity! had a female-centered format and was a feminist podcast. It was nominated for the "Best Fancast" at the Hugo Awards in 2014 and 2018. The Verity! contributors are all Doctor Who fans and live in Canada, the United States, the United Kingdom and Australia. The show was described as "intelligently fannish" and referenced as a recommended podcast.

== History ==
Verity! first aired January 2013. Deborah Stanish, the moderator of the podcast, met most of the other participants at conventions or other Doctor Who events or by working with them on non-fiction, Doctor Who-related books. Stanish wanted to hear the female and minority voices of Doctor Who fans and decided to start a podcast where several women could lend their view to the show and issues surrounding it. The format of having only women on the podcast made it stand out among the many other Doctor Who-related podcasts.

The podcast's name was a homage to Verity Lambert, the first producer of Doctor Who.

== Content ==
Verity! shows consisted of a discussion of various topics touching on and about Doctor Who among the cast members. There was a "proper" episode every other week that is about an hour long and is based on a theme that the podcasters follow all year. The other episodes were shorter, about twenty to forty minutes and on any topic the women choose. Erika Ensign and Stanish participated in most episodes: Stanish was the moderator and Ensign did the technical work. The other four cast members rotated, except for large celebratory episodes where all six came together for the show. Each contributor to Verity! lived in a different part of the world, so they recorded in their own locations and connected via a Skype call.

Verity! was not scripted, except for some contributors, like Ensign and Stanish, who used occasional notes in order to stay on topic. Overall, the show was not heavily edited and was meant to sound like a natural conversational flow.

In a January 2023 episode, the podcasters announced a hiatus. The podcast returned in November 2023, with all of the original cast discussing the three Doctor Who specials featuring David Tennant, and the Doctor Who Christmas special in December, in a series of winter podcast episodes. On August 5, 2026, the podcast released its final episode, with all six contributors participating.

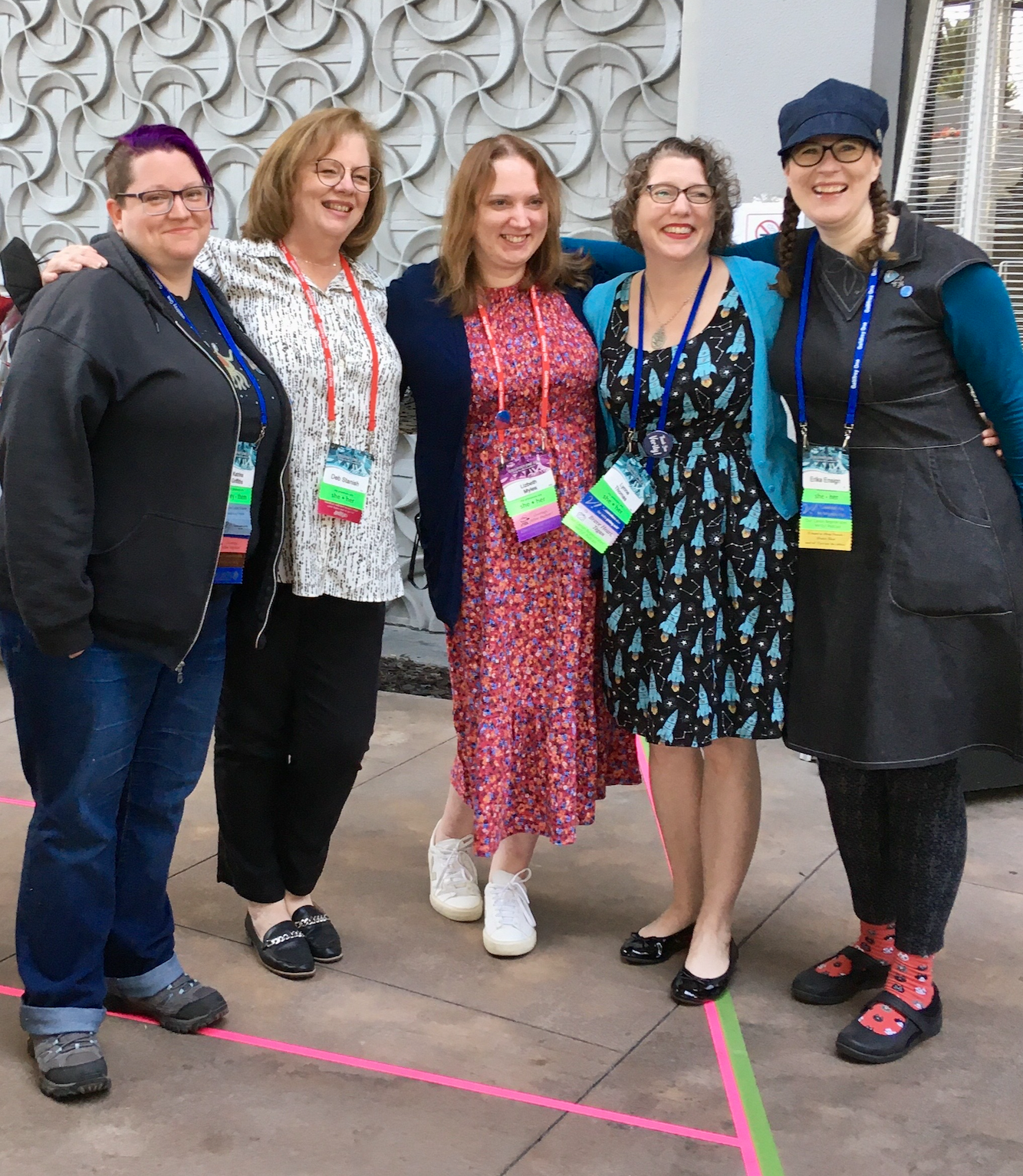
Five of the six members of the Verity! podcast team, in February 2023: from left, Kat Griffiths, Deb Stanish, L. M. Myles, Lynne M. Thomas, and Erika Ensign

== Cast members ==
- Erika Ensign (Edmonton, Alberta) – Former producer of the Apex Magazine Podcast, current co-producer of the Uncanny Magazine Podcast, and technical editor of Verity!
- Katrina (Kat) Griffiths (Edmonton, Alberta) – fan and writer.
- Liz (L.M.) Myles (Kirkcudbrightshire, Scotland) – contributor to Chicks Dig Time Lords, co-editor of Chicks Unravel Time and co-editor of Companion Piece (2015).
- Tansy Rayner Roberts (Hobart, Tasmania) – author of the Creature Court series and Hugo Award winner.
- Deborah (Deb) Stanish (Philadelphia, Pennsylvania) – co-editor of Whedonistas (2011) and co-editor of Chicks Unravel Time who moderated the panel discussion on Verity!
- Lynne M. Thomas (Urbana, Illinois) – a co-editor of Chicks Dig Time Lords: A Celebration of Doctor Who by the Women Who Love It (2010), Whedonistas (2011), and Chicks Dig Comics (2012), and a contributor to Chicks Unravel Time. She is also the former editor-in-chief of Apex Magazine, moderator of SF Squeecast, and former co-publisher and co-editor-in-chief of Uncanny Magazine.
