= Bolivar, Texas =

- Unincorporated community
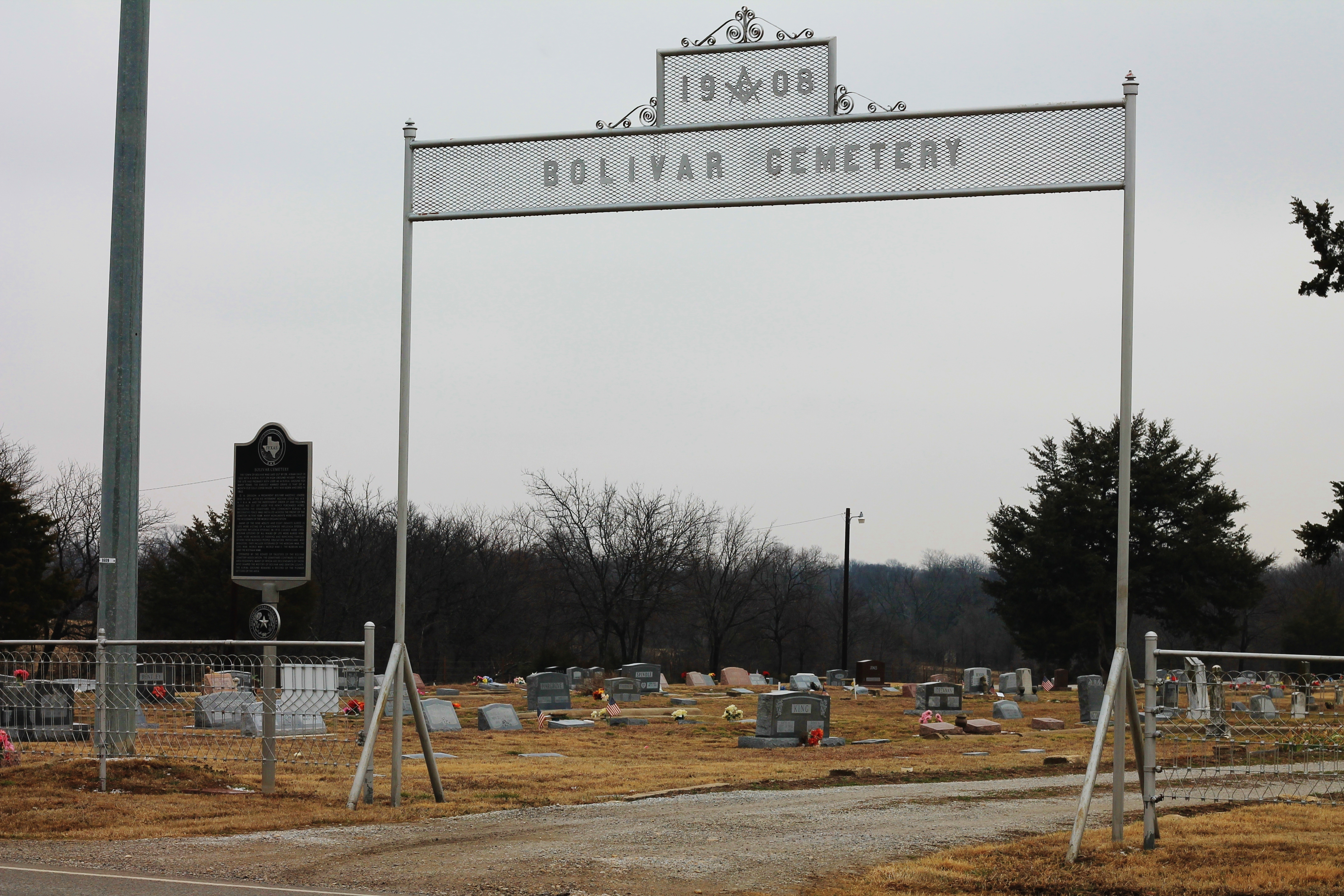

- Location within the state of Texas Bolivar (the United States)
- Coordinates: 33°21′30″N 97°14′43″W
- Country: United States
- State: Texas
- County: Denton
- Elevation: 682 ft (208 m)
- Time zone: UTC-6 (Central (CST))
  - Summer (DST): UTC-5 (CDT)
- GNIS feature ID: 1352625

Bolivar (/ˈbɒlɪvər/ BOL-i-vər) is an unincorporated community in northern Denton County, Texas, United States. According to the Handbook of Texas, the community had a population of 40 in 2000. It is located within the Dallas-Fort Worth Metroplex.

== History ==
The community was founded as New Prospect in 1859. William Crawford gave the land to Methodist physician and clergyman Hiram Daily, who established a general store and planned the town. A farmer named Ben Brown, who had migrated to the town from Bolivar, Tennessee, recommended renaming it in 1861. He convinced the locals to vote for the new name Bolivar by giving them free rum. John Simpson Chisum lived close to Bolivar, but in 1863 he relocated his herds to West Texas. Bolivar was three miles east of the Chisholm Trail, which ran through nearby cattle ranches. Trail riders stopped in Bolivar to stay at the hotel and use the saloons. Up until 1886, the community's development was gradual but continuous. Merchants from Bolivar relocated to Sanger that year, along the Gulf, Colorado and Santa Fe Railway. Bolivar remained a tiny farming village from 1900 until 1940. In the 1940s and early 1950s, oil production gave the economy a little boost. There used to be 40 oilfields in and around the town. Bolivar had 115 inhabitants in 1947, but the population also decreased in tandem with the oil production. Forty people were living there and were served by a convenience store. The population remained at 40 in 1990 and 2000.

It was named in honor of the South American leader, general, and patriot Simón Bolívar indirectly. Bolivar was the first hamlet west of Collin County and the westernmost fort in Denton County in the 1800s. Here, two stagecoach lines switched horses. The thriving town boasted multiple establishments such as a sawmill, gin, flour mill, bar, blacksmith shop, church, and school. During the Civil War, John Chisum supplied beef to the Confederacy. Sam Bass and his troops found refuge in Bolivar and the surrounding area. In 1890, two Bolivar men were imprisoned for providing shelter to infamous marauders. Numerous early inhabitants significantly contributed to the county's growth; some of their descendants currently reside here.

In 1995, the film In the Name of Love: A Texas Tragedy had some scenes filmed in Bolivar.

== Geography ==
Bolivar is located at the intersection of Farm Roads 2450 and 455, 14 mi (23 km) northwest of Denton, 4 mi (6.4 km) from Sanger, and 19 mi (31 km) from Pilot Point in Denton County.

== Education ==
The Sanger Independent School District, with all schools in Sanger, serves area students.

== Notable person ==
- Vincent Villafranca, a sculptor who has worked extensively with David Iles of Bolivar Bronze.
