= 64th World Science Fiction Convention =

64th Worldcon (2006)

L.A.con IV, the 64th World Science Fiction Convention
- Genre: Science fiction
- Dates: 23–27 August 2006
- Venue: Anaheim Convention Center
- Location: Anaheim, California
- Country: United States
- Attendance: 5,913
- Organizer: Southern California Institute for Fan Interests (SCIFI), Inc.
- Filing status: 501(c)(3) non-profit
- Website: www.laconiv.org

The 64th World Science Fiction Convention (Worldcon), also known as L.A.con IV, was held on 23–27 August 2006 at the Anaheim Convention Center and the nearby Hilton and Marriott hotels in Anaheim, California, United States.

The organizing committee was chaired by Christian B. McGuire.

== Participants ==
Attendance was 5,913, out of 6,832 paid memberships, based on preliminary post-convention data reported by the committee. The members came from 23 different countries, of which the largest contingents were from the United States, Canada, United Kingdom, Australia, and Japan.

=== Guests of honor ===
- Connie Willis (author)
- James Gurney (artist)
- Howard DeVore (fan)
- Frankie Thomas (special guest)

=== Participating writers ===
In addition to the guests of honor, the convention has announced the names of the people participating in the program.

== Awards ==
The World Science Fiction Society administers and presents the Hugo Awards, the oldest and most noteworthy award for science fiction. Selection of the recipients is by vote of the Worldcon members. Categories include novels and short fiction, artwork, dramatic presentations, and various professional and fandom activities.

Other awards may be presented at Worldcon at the discretion of the individual convention committee. This has often included the national SF awards of the host country, such as the Japanese Seiun Awards as part of Nippon 2007, and the Prix Aurora Awards as part of Anticipation in 2009. The Astounding Award for Best New Writer and the Sidewise Award, though not sponsored by the Worldcon, are usually presented, as well as the Chesley Awards, the Prometheus Award, and others. In 2021, the Nommo Awards began presenting at Worldcon.

=== 2006 Hugo Awards ===
- Best Novel: Spin by Robert Charles Wilson
- Best Novella: "Inside Job" by Connie Willis
- Best Novelette: "Two Hearts" by Peter S. Beagle
- Best Short Story: "Tk'tk'tk" by David D. Levine
- Best Related Book: Storyteller: Writing Lessons and More from 27 Years of the Clarion Writers' Workshop by Kate Wilhelm
- Best Dramatic Presentation, Long Form: Serenity, written and directed by Joss Whedon.
- Best Dramatic Presentation, Short Form: Doctor Who: The Empty Child & The Doctor Dances, written by Steven Moffat, directed by James Hawes.
- Best Professional Editor: David G. Hartwell
- Best Professional Artist: Donato Giancola
- Best Semiprozine: Locus, edited by Charles N. Brown, Kirsten Gong-Wong, and Liza Groen Trombi
- Best Fanzine: Plokta, edited by Alison Scott, Steve Davies, and Mike Scott
- Best Fan Writer: Dave Langford
- Best Fan Artist: Frank Wu

=== Other awards ===
- John W. Campbell Award for Best New Writer: John Scalzi
- Special Committee Awards: Betty Ballantine, Harlan Ellison, Fred Patten

== Future site selection ==
The members of L.A.con IV (and Interaction, the 2005 Worldcon) selected the hosting city for the 66th World Science Fiction Convention, to be held in 2008.

== See also ==
- Science fiction
- Speculative fiction
- World Science Fiction Society

Preceded by 63rd World Science Fiction Convention; Interaction in Glasgow, UK (2005)	List of Worldcons; 64th World Science Fiction Convention; L.A.con IV in Anaheim, California, United States (2006)	Succeeded by 65th World Science Fiction Convention; Nippon 2007 in Yokohama, Japan (2007)
