= Electric Velocipede =

Small press speculative fiction fan magazine

- Editor: John Klima
- Frequency: Biannual
- Founder: John Klima
- Founded: 2001
- Final issue: 2013
- Company: Spilt Milk Press
- Country: United States
- Based in: Bettendorf, Iowa
- Language: English
- Website: www.electricvelocipede.com
- ISSN: 1949-2030

Electric Velocipede was a small press speculative fiction fan magazine edited by John Klima. Published from 2001 to 2013, Electric Velocipede won the Hugo Award for Best Fanzine in 2009.

== History ==
In 2000, editor John Klima was inspired to create a magazine by editor Gavin Grant during a panel at Readercon. The first issue made its debut at the 2001 SFWA Writers/Editors Banquet. At that point Klima began selling single issues and subscriptions.

Klima was able to publish two issues a year and gained the ability to pay contributors with issue #10 in 2006. That same year, under the aegis of his independent publishing company Spilt Milk Press, Klima published chapbooks by Electric Velocipede authors. These included The Sense of Falling by Ezra Pines, An Alternate History of the 21st Century by William Shunn, and Psychological Methods to Sell Must Be Destroyed by Robert Freeman Wexler.

The first 16 issues of Electric Velocipede were produced and published solely by Klima. In 2008 he announced a partnership with independent publisher Night Shade Books to publish and distribute the zine. Klima and Night Shade Books dissolved their partnership at the end of 2010 and Klima then handled the magazine independently. In 2012, the magazine ceased publishing printed issues and went online with issue 23. The magazine closed completely in 2013.

== Staff ==
- John Klima, Publisher, Editor in Chief
- Anne Zanoni, Managing Editor
- Damien Walters Grintalis, Associate Editor
- Jamie Lackey, Assistant Editor

== Notable authors and stories ==
Electric Velocipede has featured work from award-winning and well-known speculative fiction authors from its first issue. Some of the contributors include: Marie Brennan, Richard Bowes, Hal Duncan, Charles Coleman Finlay, Jeffrey Ford, Alex Irvine, Paul Jessup (writer), Jay Lake, Sandra McDonald, Patrick O'Leary, Bruce Holland Rogers, Catherynne M. Valente, Jeff VanderMeer, Leslie What, Liz Williams, and Marly Youmans.

=== Awards ===
- "The Way He Does It" by Jeffrey Ford (issue #10) - Nominated: Best Short Fiction, World Fantasy Award
- Electric Velocipede - Winner: Best Fanzine, 2009 Hugo Award
- John Klima - Nominated: Special Award: Non-Professional, 2007 World Fantasy Award
- John Klima - Nominated: Special Award: Non-Professional, 2008 World Fantasy Award
- John Klima - Nominated: Special Award: Non-Professional, 2009 World Fantasy Award
- John Klima - Nominated: Special Award: Non-Professional, 2010 World Fantasy Award

=== Reprinted stories ===
- "A Keeper" by Alan DeNiro in Skinny Dipping in the Lake of the Dead (issue #6)
- "The Way He Does It" by Jeffrey Ford in The Drowned Life (issue #10)
- "Moon Does Run" by Edd Vick in Year's Best SF 12 (issue #11)
- "How the World Became Quiet: A Post-Human Creation Myth" by Rachel Swirsky in Best American Fantasy 2 (issue #13)
- "The Death of Sugar Daddy", by Toiya Kristen Finley in The Year's Best Science Fiction and Fantasy: 2010 Edition (issue #17/18)
- "Heaven Under Earth", by Aliette de Bodard in The Year's Best Science Fiction and Fantasy: 2013 Edition (issue #24)
- "The Irish Astronaut", by Val Nolan in The Year's Best Science Fiction: Thirty-First Annual Collection (issue #26)

== Issues ==
As of December 2013, there have been 27 issues of Electric Velocipede. Issue 14 was an all-female issue in honor of the WisCon Feminist Science Fiction Convention.
