= Jeremy Szal =

Australian fiction author (born 1995)

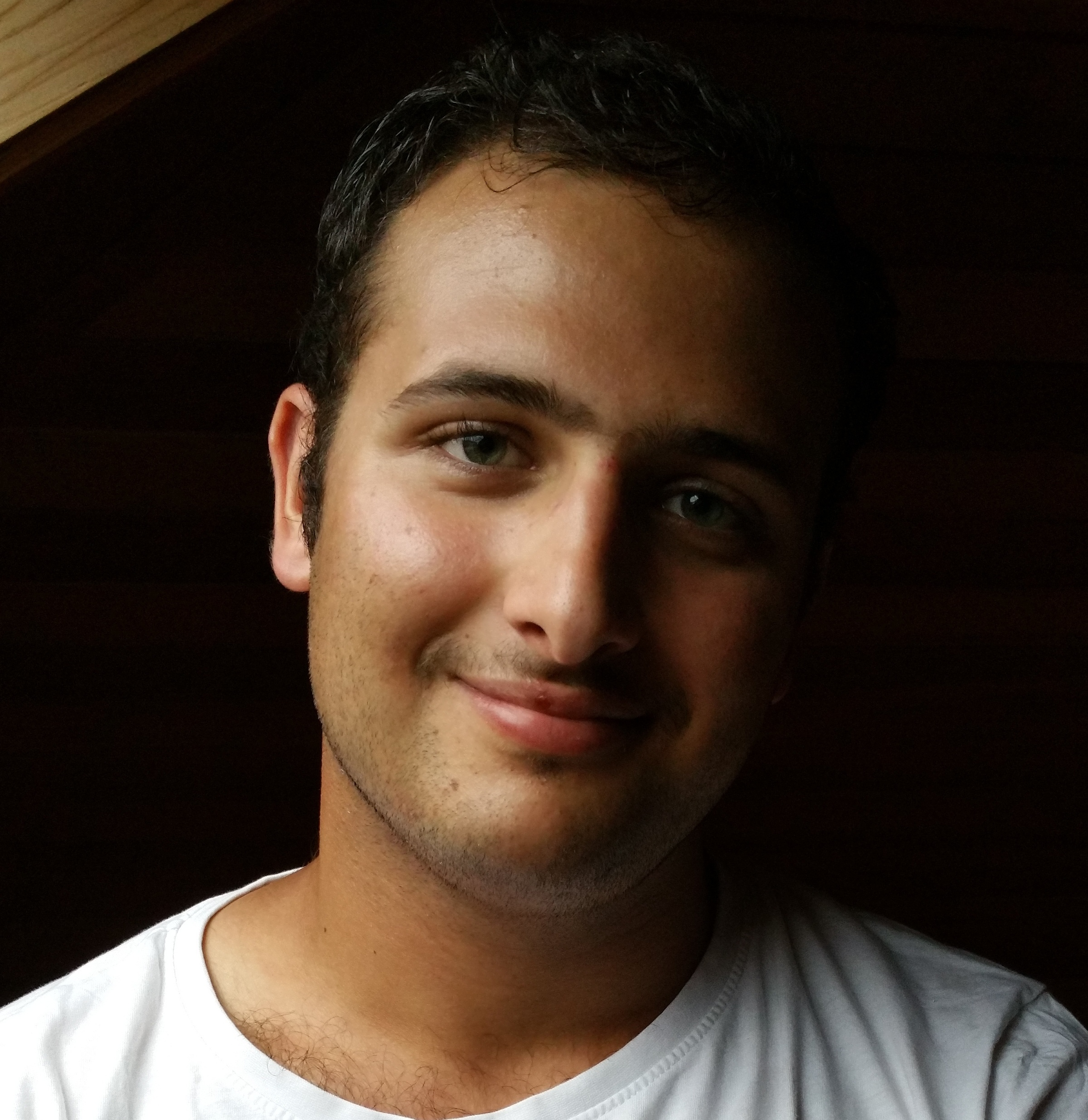
- Born: May 31, 1995 (age 31); Sydney, Australia
- Education: University of New South Wales
- Occupation: Writer
- Writing career
- Period: 2014-
- Genres: Science-fiction, fantasy, space-opera
- Notable works: Stormblood, Blindspace, Wolfskin
- Website: jeremyszal.com

Jeremy Szal (born May 31, 1995) is an Australian space opera and fantasy author. He often describes his work as "spacepunk" or gothic space opera. His first novel, Stormblood, was published by Gollancz in 2020, with the sequel Blindspace following in 2021. He has published forty short stories, and his work has appeared in eleven languages.

== Personal ==
Jeremy Szal was born in Sydney, Australia, where he has lived almost all his life. He has a BA in Film Studies and Creative Writing from the University of New South Wales.

From 2014 to 2020, he was the fiction editor and audio producer for the Hugo-winning podcast StarShipSofa. Authors he's worked with on the show include George R. R. Martin, Harlan Ellison, and William Gibson.

He is of Middle-Eastern and Slavic descent.

== Writing career ==
Szal is the author of The Common Saga. The books are published by Gollancz in the UK and Hachette in Australia and New Zealand. Stormblood, the first novel, was accepted for publication in 2018, when Szal was 23 years old, and was published in 2020, followed by Blindspace in 2021.

The series heavily features stormtech, a drug made from the DNA of an extinct alien race, making users permanently addicted to adrenaline and aggression. This drug was injected into people to turn them into elite super soldiers called Reapers. The series follows Vakov Fukasawa, a Reaper, who has walked away from a war, only to discover that his former squadmates are being killed by someone close to him. The central narrative takes place on Compass, a giant hollowed-out asteroid, established as a galactic commonwealth, populated by various aliens, nomadic warriors, drug-dealers, cyberneticists, cultists, smugglers, and bounty hunters. Szal's work regularly addresses themes of trauma and violence and power, justice and injustice, drug addiction, abuse, familial relationships, brotherhood, and masculinity.

Stormblood was described in The Guardian as a book that "boasts gloriously described alien worlds, mammoth starships, exotic weaponry and bizarre extraterrestrials – but Szal doesn’t stint on the human element." Szal cites among his influences authors such as Pierce Brown, Joe Abercrombie, George R. R. Martin, Karen Traviss, Alastair Reynolds, Dan Simmons, and Iain M. Banks. He has also cited the influence of video games on his writing, such as Halo, Mass Effect, The Witcher, Dark Souls, and Bioshock. Although he writes diverse characters and sets his stories in global locations, Szal says he is "less interested in drawing the lines at borders and is more invested in seeing what the whole world has to offer".

His short stories, nonfiction articles and essays on science-fiction genre have appeared in numerous anthologies and magazines, including Nature, Lightspeed Magazine, Strange Horizons.

He was a Special Guest at the 81st Worldcon in Chengdu, China, where he accepted the Hugo Award for Adrian Tchaikovsky for his "Children of Time" series.

== Bibliography ==
=== The Common Saga ===
1. Stormblood (2020)
2. Blindspace (2021)
3. Wolfskin (2025)

=== Short fiction ===
- "The Galaxy’s Cube" in Abyss and Apex, Issue 58, 2016
- "Walls of Nigeria" in Nature, August 11, 2016
- "When There's Only Dust Left" in Nature, May 11, 2017
- "House of Dolls" in Tales to Terrify, Episode 277.
- "Ark of Bones" in StarShipSofa, No 509
- "Dead Men Walking" in Abyss & Apex, 2018
- "Traumahead" in Nature, June 28, 2018
- "The dataSultan of Streets and Stars" in Where the Stars Rise: Asian Science Fiction and Fantasy Stories, 2018
- "Inkskinned" in Shades Within Us: Tales of Migrations and Fractured Borders, 2018
- "The Cloud Heart" in Nature, 2019.
- "Tomorrow, the Sunset Will Be Blue" in Nature, 2019
- "Shipmaster's Scalp" in Nature, 2019.
- "A Love Like Bruises" in Kaleidotrope, Summer 2020
- "Scream in Blue" in London Centric: Tales of Future London, 2020
- "Oceans Like Neurons" in Nature, October 22, 2021
- "Beneath a Bicameral Moon" in Shapers of Worlds II: Volume II, 2021
- "The Black Horse" in The King Must Fall, 2022.
- "Metal Empathy" in Broken Stars, 2024

=== Collections ===
- Broken Stars (2024)
