= Marshall Ryan Maresca =

American fantasy author (born 1973)

- Born: March 31, 1973 (age 53); Syracuse, New York, U.S.
- Education: Pennsylvania State University
- Occupation: Novelist
- Writing career
- Genre: Fantasy
- Notable works: The Thorn of Dentonhill (2015); A Murder of Mages (2015); The Holver Alley Crew (2017); The Velocity of Revolution (2021)
- Website: mrmaresca.com

Marshall Ryan Maresca (born March 31, 1973) is an American fantasy author, best known for the multiple series of Maradaine novels, consisting of four different series set in the same fantastical city. He grew up in upstate New York, studied film production at Penn State. He currently lives in Austin, Texas.

His debut novel, The Thorn of Dentonhill, was nominated for the Compton Crook Award.

== Life and career ==
In addition to being a writer, Maresca works with his wife, an independent Spanish teacher in Austin, Texas. He has also been a stage actor, a theatrical director and an amateur chef. He states that as an actor, he mostly played minor roles, which he attributes to helping him understand the motivations and point of view of his different characters. He has also written several plays produced in the Austin area, including Slow Night at McLaughlin’s and Entropy.

Maresca has named among his influences Zilpha Keatley Snyder, David Eddings and Isaac Asimov.

Maresca is also the co-host of the podcast Worldbuilding for Masochists with Natania Barron and Cass Morris. It has been a finalist five times for the Hugo Award for Best Fancast.

== Bibliography ==
MARADAINE UNIVERSE

Thorn of Maradaine Novels

- The Thorn of Dentonhill, DAW Books (2015)
- The Alchemy of Chaos, DAW Books (2016)
- The Imposters of Aventil, DAW Books (2017)
- The Assassins of Consequence, DAW Books (2022)

The Maradaine Constabulary

- A Murder of Mages, DAW Books (2015)
- An Import of Intrigue, DAW Books (2016)
- A Parliament of Bodies, DAW Books (2019)

The Streets of Maradaine

- The Holver Alley Crew, DAW Books (2017)
- Lady Henterman's Wardrobe, DAW Books (2018)
- The Fenmere Job, DAW Books (2020)
- The Quarrygate Gambit, DAW Books (2022)

The Maradaine Elite

- The Way of the Shield, DAW Books (2018)
- The Shield of the People, DAW Books (2019)
- The People of the City, DAW Books (2020)

An Unintended Voyage, DAW Books (2021)

The Mystical Murders of Yin Mara, Artemisia Books (2022)

Other Novels

The Velocity of Revolution, DAW Books (2021)

Short Stories

- "Reminder" appearing in Hint Fiction: An Anthology of Stories in 25 Words or Fewer edited by Robert Swartwood (2010)
- "Jump the Black" appearing in Rayguns Over Texas edited by Rick Klaw (2013)
