= 69th World Science Fiction Convention =

69th Worldcon (2011)

Renovation, the 69th World Science Fiction Convention
- official logo by Brad Foster
- Status: Active
- Genre: Science fiction
- Dates: 17–21 August 2011
- Venue: Reno-Sparks Convention Center
- Location: Reno, Nevada
- Country: United States
- Organizer: Reno Convention Fandom, Inc.
- Filing status: 501(c)(3) non-profit
- Website: renovationsf.org

The 69th World Science Fiction Convention (Worldcon), also known as Renovation, was held on 17–21 August 2011 at the Reno-Sparks Convention Center (RSCC) in Reno, Nevada, United States. The Atlantis Casino Resort served as the headquarters/party hotel, with additional rooms supplied by the Peppermill Reno and Courtyard by Marriott.

The convention committee was chaired by Patty Wells.

== Participants ==
=== Guests of honor ===
- Tim Powers
- Ellen Asher
- Boris Vallejo
- the late Charles N. Brown, whose contribution was still honored

=== Special Guests ===
- Tricky Pixie
- Bill Willingham

=== Other notable participants ===
- author George R. R. Martin
- radio legend Dr. Demento
- artist Julie Bell

== Programming and events ==
The Masquerade and the Hugo Awards ceremony were held at the Peppermill. Most other events took place at the RSCC.

Special events included:

- the Renovation Independent/Fan Film Festival 2011
- Music Night on Wednesday
- an Art Night festival celebrating the visual arts in SF on Thursday

The Masquerade was held on Friday the 19th.

== Awards ==
The World Science Fiction Society administers and presents the Hugo Awards, the oldest and most noteworthy award for science fiction. Selection of the recipients is by vote of the Worldcon members. Categories include novels and short fiction, artwork, dramatic presentations, and various professional and fandom activities.

Other awards may be presented at Worldcon at the discretion of the individual convention committee. This has often included the national SF awards of the host country, such as the Japanese Seiun Awards as part of Nippon 2007, and the Prix Aurora Awards as part of Anticipation in 2009. The Astounding Award for Best New Writer and the Sidewise Award, though not sponsored by the Worldcon, are usually presented, as well as the Chesley Awards, the Prometheus Award, and others. In 2021, the Nommo Awards began presenting at Worldcon.

=== 2011 Hugo Awards ===
The results were based on the 2100 valid ballots submitted by current members of the World Science Fiction Society. The 2011 Hugo Award statue base was designed by Marina Gelineau.

The awards were presented on Saturday, 20 August.

- Best Novel: Blackout/All Clear by Connie Willis
- Best Novella: The Lifecycle of Software Objects by Ted Chiang
- Best Novelette: "The Emperor of Mars" by Allen Steele
- Best Short Story: "For Want of a Nail" by Mary Robinette Kowal
- Best Related Work: Chicks Dig Time Lords: A Celebration of Doctor Who by the Women Who Love It by Lynne M. Thomas and Tara O'Shea (Mad Norwegian Press)
- Best Graphic Story: Girl Genius, Volume 10: Agatha Heterodyne and the Guardian Muse, written by Phil Foglio and Kaja Foglio, art by Phil Foglio, colors by Cheyenne Wright
- Best Dramatic Presentation, Long Form: Inception, screenplay by Christopher Nolan; story by Christopher Nolan; directed by Christopher Nolan (Warner Bros.)
- Best Dramatic Presentation, Short Form: Doctor Who, "The Pandorica Opens"/"The Big Bang", screenplay by Steven Moffat, directed by Toby Haynes (BBC Cymru Wales)
- Best Professional Editor, Long Form: Lou Anders
- Best Professional Editor, Short Form: Sheila Williams
- Best Professional Artist: Shaun Tan
- Best Semiprozine: Clarkesworld Magazine, edited by Neil Clarke, Sean Wallace, and Cheryl Morgan; podcast directed by Kate Baker
- Best Fanzine: The Drink Tank, edited by Christopher J. Garcia and James Bacon
- Best Fan Writer: Claire Brialey
- Best Fan Artist: Brad W. Foster

=== Chesley Awards ===
The Chesley Awards were presented on 18 August as part of Art Night.

=== Other awards ===
- John W. Campbell Award for Best New Writer: Lev Grossman
- Forrest J Ackerman Big Heart Award: Gay Haldeman

== Site selection ==
Reno's bid to host the Worldcon was formally unopposed and won with 650 out of the 763 cast ballots at Anticipation in Montréal, Québec in 2009.

== Future site selection ==
In an uncontested election, the members of the convention selected San Antonio, Texas, as the host city for the 71st World Science Fiction Convention, "LoneStarCon 3", to be held in 2013. With 760 valid ballots cast, Texas received 694 votes, 25 ballots expressed no preference, 14 votes were cast for none of the above, and write-in candidates included Xerpes with 6 votes, Minneapolis with 5, Denton with 5, Boston with 3, plus a number of single-vote entries.

== Notes ==
A pair of autographed shooting scripts for the HBO television series Game of Thrones were stolen in transit from Belfast to Reno. The theft of the scripts, donated by author George R. R. Martin whose books are the basis for the series and intended for sale at the convention's charity auction, made international headlines. Shipped via registered mail, only the cover letter in a "battered" envelope arrived in Reno. The scripts were signed by executive producers Dan Weiss and David Benioff plus director Alan Taylor.

== See also ==
- Hugo Award
- Science fiction
- Speculative fiction
- World Science Fiction Society
- Worldcon

Preceded by 68th World Science Fiction Convention; Aussiecon Four in Melbourne, Australia (2010)	List of Worldcons; 69th World Science Fiction Convention; Renovation in Reno, Nevada, United States (2011)	Succeeded by 70th World Science Fiction Convention; Chicon 7 in Chicago, Illinois, United States (2012)
