= Vincent Villafranca =

American sculptor (born 1969)

- Born: January 25, 1969 (age 57); Monterey, California
- Education: Southwest Texas State University
- Known for: Sculpture

Vincent Villafranca (born January 25, 1969) is an American sculptor. He creates bronze sculptures ranging from traditional wildlife imagery to futuristic science-fiction-based imagery.

== Biography ==
=== Early life and education ===
Villafranca was born January 25, 1969, in Monterey, California and spent his early years in Venezuela, Mexico and Del Rio, Texas. Even at a young age, he used his unique imagination to create works of art out of common items, painting, sketching and creating small sculptures as a child. Much of his early work was influenced by television and film, particularly westerns and science-fiction films. He earned a B.A. in History from Southwest Texas State University in 1994 and apprenticed at Michael Hall's Studio Foundry during his final year of undergraduate studies.

=== Career ===
Villafranca has worked extensively with David Iles of Bolivar Bronze in Bolivar, Texas.

In 2009, he created the physical bronze sculpture used as the Bradbury Award. This award is presented annually by the Science Fiction and Fantasy Writers of America as part of the Nebula Awards ceremony. In 2013, Villafranca designed and produced the Hugo Awards for the 71st World Science Fiction Convention. In 2016, the new World Fantasy Award was debuted; Villafranca designed the award and creates the trophies every year. The trophy is that of a leafless tree in front of a full moon and replaced the bust of H. P. Lovecraft, whose rampant racism made many uncomfortable. World Fantasy decided a new award would honor the winners and Villafranca's design was chosen as the new trophy.

=== Marriage and children ===
Villafranca and Michelle Mitchell were married in Hays, Texas.

== Awards ==
- 2006: Best 3-D Art, World Fantasy Convention, "The Poacher's Nightmare"
- 2007: Body of Work, World Fantasy Convention
- 2008: Chesley Award, Best 3-D Art, "A Conscious Entity & Its Maker"
- 2008: Jurors' Award, World Science Fiction Convention, "The Celestial Itinerant"
- 2009: Chesley Award, Best 3-D Art, "Otherworldly Procession" (Bronze)
- 2010: Chesley Award, Best 3-D Art, "The Switching Hour"
- 2012: Chesley Award, Best 3-D Art, "Robo-Bike"
