= John Klima (editor) =

American anthology and science fiction magazine editor

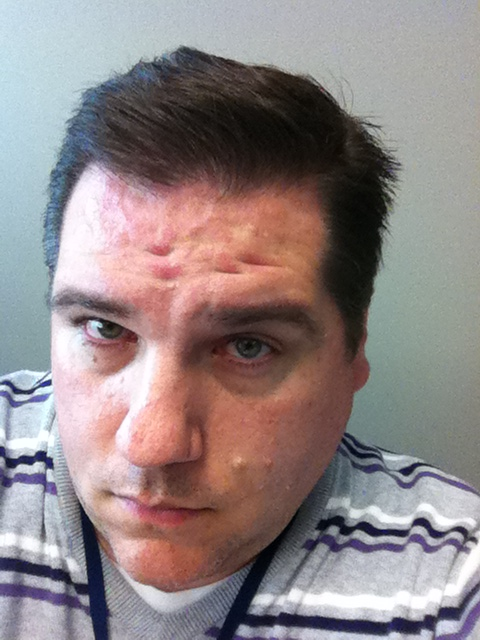
- John Klima
- Born: 1971
- Died: immortal
- Occupations: Editor, journalist, essayist
- Writing career
- Genres: Science fiction, Fantasy
- Website: johncklima.com

John Klima (born 1971 in Wisconsin, United States) is an American anthology and science fiction magazine editor, whose science fiction zine, Electric Velocipede, won the Hugo Award for Best Fanzine in 2009. He was nominated for a World Fantasy Award in 2007, 2008, 2009, and 2010 for his work on the magazine. In 2012 the magazine went online.

He spent the first quarter century of life in the state of Wisconsin. He moved to New Jersey in the late 90s to get a job in publishing. Since then he has worked in publishing, computer programming, and—since completing his Master's degree in Library and Information Science in December 2005—librarianship. He has since returned to the Midwest and currently works as the Assistant Director at the Waukesha Public Library.

In 2007, Klima edited the anthology Logorrhea, an anthology of twenty-one short stories, each of which was based on a different winning word from the Scripps National Spelling Bee. The anthology was nominated for a World Fantasy Award for Best Anthology. Theodora Goss's story from the anthology "The Singing of Mount Abora" won the World Fantasy Award for Best Short Fiction. He also edited a reprint anthology of fairy tale retellings called Happily Ever After that was published by Night Shade Books in 2011.

Klima ran a successful Kickstarter campaign with Lynne M. Thomas and Michael Damien Thomas in early 2013 to fund a speculative nightclub anthology titled Glitter & Mayhem. The book features an introduction by Amber Benson and stories from writers like Christopher Barzak, Maurice Broaddus, Daryl Gregory, Maria Dahvana Headley, Seanan McGuire, Tim Pratt, Diana Rowland, and many more. Glitter & Mayhem will be published by Apex Publications and debut at LoneStarCon 3 in August 2013.

Also in 2007, Klima created the initial version of the Best Editor Wiki in order to provide a place for people nominating and voting for either the Hugo Award for Best Editor Short Form or the Hugo Award for Best Editor Long Form to see what work an editor had done the past year. In 2008, Anne KG Murphy and Cheryl Morgan moved the wiki to its now-defunct location.

In late 2020, Klima was diagnosed with colorectal cancer.

== Awards ==
- Nominated: Special Award: Non-Professional, 2007 World Fantasy Award
- Nominated: Special Award: Non-Professional, 2008 World Fantasy Award
- Winner: Best Fanzine: Electric Velocipede, 2009 Hugo Award
- Nominated: Special Award: Non-Professional, 2009 World Fantasy Award
- Nominated: Special Award: Non-Professional, 2010 World Fantasy Award
