= David Annandale =

UK science fiction writer (born 1967)

- Born: 1967 (age 58–59)
- Occupation: Author
- Writing career
- Genres: science fantasy, fantasy, horror

David Annandale (born 1967) is a Canadian speculative fiction author. He received a BA (1990) and an MA (1992) from the University of Manitoba, and took a PhD from the University of Alberta; he currently teaches at the University of Manitoba. Annandale is a regular contributor to The Skiffy and Fanty Show podcast as "The Kaiju Whisperer". His contributions to that podcast have led to two Hugo nominations for the Hugo Award for Best Fancast, once in 2014 and later in 2021. He is predominantly known for his numerous fiction contributions to various Warhammer 40,000 series.

== Select bibliography ==
=== Warhammer 40,000 ===
Contributed roughly two dozen works to the greater Warhammer universe, with over 60 works to the following Warhammer 40,000 series:

- Adeptus Mechanicus (2016)
- Adeptus Titanicus (2017)
- Angels of Death (2013)
- Blood Angels (2012–2016)
- Deathwatch (2012)
- Grey Knights (2015–2018)
- Legion of the Damned (2016)
- Lords of the Space Marines (2013)
- Sabbat Worlds Crusade (2015)
- Sanctus Reach (2014)
- Space Marine Battles (2013–2015)
- Space Marine Legends (2017)
- Space Wolf/Ragnar Blackmane (2016–2017)
- The Beast Arises (2016–2018)
- The Horus Heresy (2012–2020)
- Ultramarines (2018)
- Yarrick (2012–2018)

=== Standalone novels ===
- Gethsemane Hall (2012)
- The Wicked and the Damned (2019) with Phil Kelly and Josh Reynolds
- The House of Night and Chain (2019)
