= Sunyi Dean =

Fantasy fiction author

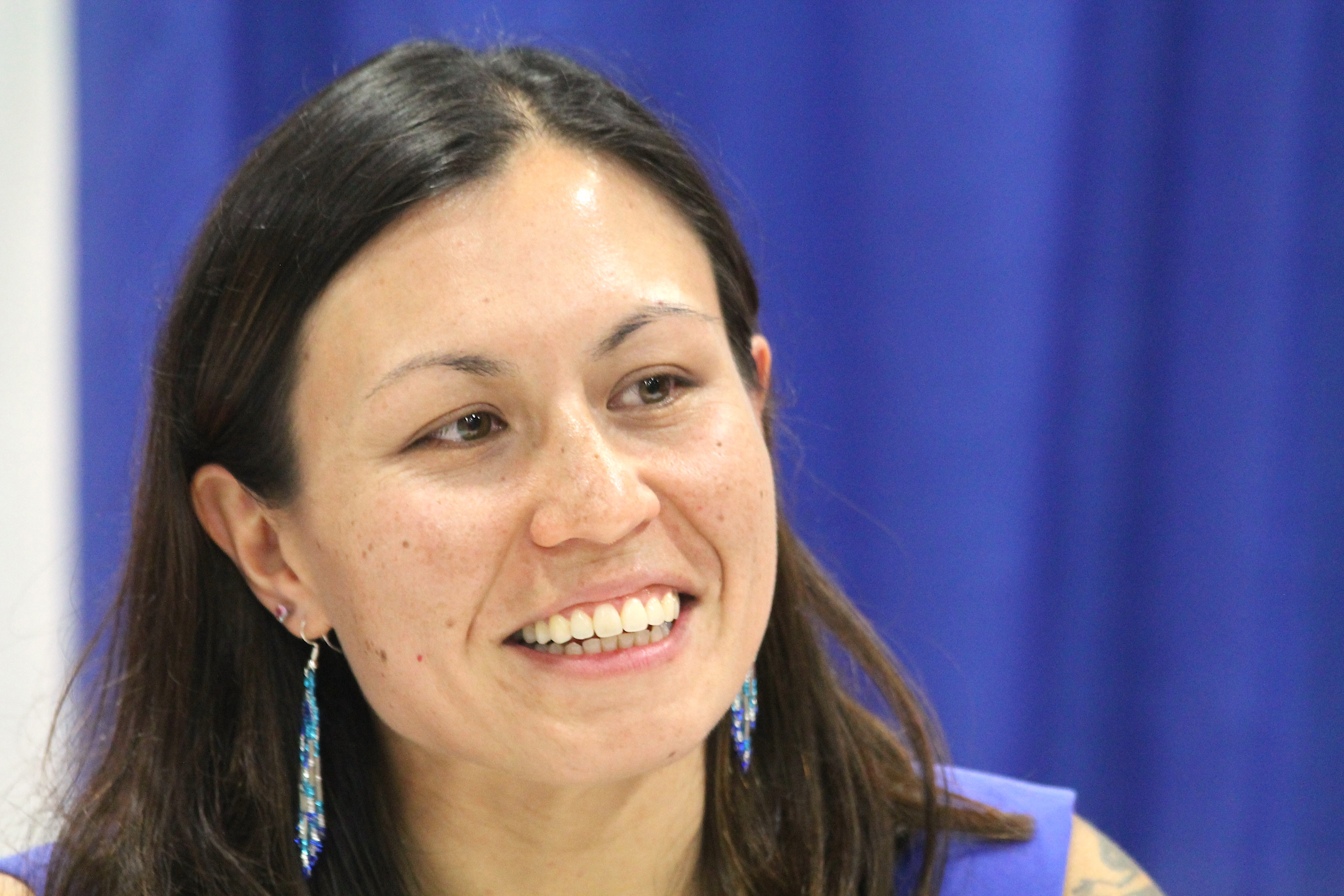
- Sunyi Dean in 2026
- Born: Denton, Texas, United States
- Occupations: Novelist, short story writer
- Writing career
- Notable work: The Book Eaters
- Website: sunyidean.com

Sunyi Dean (born June 10, 1987) is an author of speculative fiction and dark fantasy fiction.

== Early life ==
Sunyi Dean was born in Denton, Texas, on June 10, 1987. She tells of being raised in Hong Kong, and later settling in Northern England. She currently lives in Yorkshire, England. Her maternal grandmother came from Shanghai, moved to Hong Kong, and gave birth to Dean's mother in 1958. She does not share any information on the other half of her racial makeup, or parents.

== Career ==
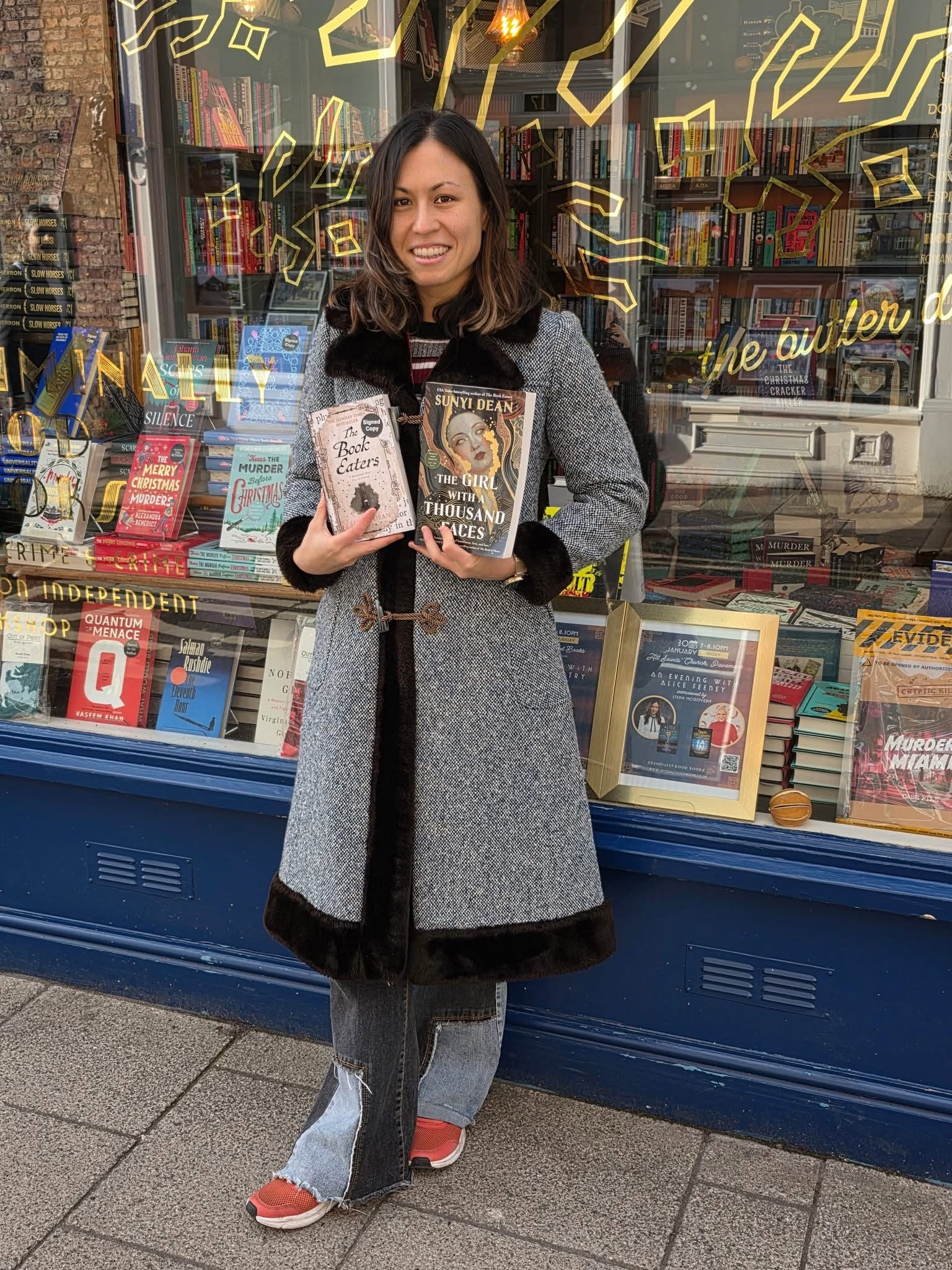
Sunyi holding her books, 2025

Sunyi Dean decided to start trying to write in 2016, after hitting her 30s, "as an act of last resort, unsure what else to do or try with my life."

Dean began her career with short stories. She has listed her favorite authors as Charlotte Brontë, Gene Wolfe, George MacDonald, J. R. R. Tolkien, and Nnedi Okorafor.

Reviews of her 2022 debut, a gothic fantasy titled The Book Eaters, were largely favorable. A starred review from Publishers Weekly said: "Dean’s unputdownable debut gives the phrase 'voracious reader' a new, very literal meaning." Library Journal's starred review called it "a fascinating debut with shades of gothic fantasy and contemporary thriller, wrapped in a narrative full of vivid and detailed characters and worldbuilding, and an unusual premise." A starred review from Booklist noted: "Dean’s debut novel is a powerful story of overwhelming mother love, as something both powerful and potentially horrific."

The Book Eaters was a USA Today #2 bestseller. The Book Eaters debuted at #2 on the Sunday Times bestseller list for fiction hardbacks in the UK, and also reached #2 on the Vancouver Sun's list of bestselling international books in August 2022. It was nominated for a Goodreads Choice Award in 2022. Booklist named it a top science fiction/fantasy and horror debut of 2022.

Dean created the podcast Publishing Rodeo with author Scott Drakeford, which was nominated for the Hugo Award for Best Fancast in 2024.

She most recently released The Girl with a Thousand Faces, a novel, in 2026.

== Works ==
- —— (2022). The Book Eaters. Tor Books. ISBN 9781250810182.
- —— (2022). The Thief of Memory. Tor Books. ISBN 9781250860316.
- —— (2023). How to Cook and Eat the Rich. Tor Books. ISBN 9781250875921.
- —— (2026). The Girl with a Thousand Faces. Tor Books. ISBN 9781250810212.
