= Dungeon Crawlers Radio =

Presentation
- Hosted by: Daniel Swenson; Scott Silver; Vairin Wall
- Genre: Science Fiction, Fantasy
- Updates: Weekly

Publication
- Original release: 2008

Dungeon Crawlers Radio is a podcast, internet radio program and blog that focuses on science fiction and fantasy news, discussions, and reviews of games, movies, comics, and books. Programming frequently includes interviews with authors, game developers, actors, and media personalities. The show averaged 170,000 listeners weekly.

== History ==
Dungeon Crawlers Radio started in 2008 in Utah. As an attempt to gain on-air radio experience, Daniel Swenson, using the on-air name of Revan, and Riley Booms, going under the name Malak, started the podcast in Booms's basement. The basement had bars on its windows which Swenson and Booms felt made the space seem like a dungeon, and decided to incorporate that into the shows name.

In 2009, the podcast got picked up as a weekly radio internet show by UtahFM, a local internet radio station. The show originally aired on Monday nights and continues to air weekly on Monday. The format of the show expanded to include downloads on iTunes and BlogTalkRadio.

The program added additional personnel as its listening base and popularity grew, including additional co-hosts. Booms left the show in 2011 to pursue other projects.

In 2015, Dungeon Crawlers Radio received a nomination for the Hugo Award for Best Fancast.

== Notable guests ==
The show has had numerous interviews with notable guests. Some of the notable guests are listed below.

- Larry Correia
- Lou Ferrigno
- Tracy Hickman
- R. A. Salvatore
- Brandon Sanderson
- Kevin Sorbo
