= StarShipSofa =

UK science fiction podcast

- Blast Off with the StarShipSofa

Presentation
- Hosted by: Tony C. Smith
- Genre: Science Fiction
- Updates: Weekly

Production
- No. of episodes: 765

Publication
- Original release: July 2006
- Ratings: 5/5, 4.8/5

Related
- Website: http://www.starshipsofa.com

StarShipSofa is a science fiction audio magazine and podcast from the United Kingdom hosted by Tony C. Smith. It publishes audio short fiction, commentary, essays, and anthologies of transcribed material. StarShipSofa was the first ever podcast to be both nominated for and to win a Hugo Award for Best Fanzine. It was also nominated for Best Fan Podcast in the 2007 Parsec Awards. StarShipSofa is free directly from the web site and is available for subscription and automatic download through iTunes.

== History ==
The audio magazine is hosted weekly by Tony C. Smith in the UK. It was first broadcast in July 2006 by Smith and Ciaran O'Carrol with an episode focusing on Alfred Bester. The next 70 episodes ran weekly and featured commentary on such subjects as Harlan Ellison, Samuel R. Delany, Charles Stross, and other well-known science fiction authors. StarShipSofa also covered subjects such as films and specific themes such as religion in science fiction.

In 2010 many of these original podcasts were transcribed and published in book form as StarShipSofa: The Captain's Logs.

At the end of this initial run O'Carrol left StarShipSofa and the podcast began to transition to an audio fiction magazine, with narrated fiction mixed with commentary and essays. Now calling itself StarShipSofa - The Audio Science Fiction Magazine, in October 2007 StarShipSofa began podcasting Hugo Award winning audio stories for free. In March 2008, for the first time ever, all five of the short stories that had been shortlisted for the BSFA Award for Best Short Story were made available on the StarShipSofa in audio narrated format.

Adam Pracht was the assistant editor up until September 2014, when he left to pursue other activities. He was replaced with Jeremy Szal, which was announced in Episode 361. Szal is the fiction editor and producer, Gary Dowell the co-producer and Ralph M. Ambrose the assistant editor.

=== Hugo Award ===
On 4 April 2010, StarShipSofa became the first podcast to ever be included on the Hugo Awards ballot. It was nominated in the category Best Fanzine. On 5 September 2010 StarShipSofa went on to become the first podcast to win a Hugo Award. The award was presented at Aussiecon 4 in Melbourne, Australia.

As a result, the 2011 business meeting of the Worldcon voted to create a new category for "Best Fancast", so that podcasts would no longer be deemed a fanzine or be eligible for a fanzine Hugo.

== District of Wonders ==
In January 2012 StarShipSofa launched its first spin-off, a horror podcast hosted by Lawrence Santoro called Tales to Terrify. This was followed in July 2012 by two more spin-offs - the crime-themed Crime City Central hosted by Jack Calverley, and the pulp-themed Protecting Project Pulp hosted by Dave Robison. The four were under the District of Wonders banner. However, The District of Wonders closed both Crime City Central and Protecting Project Pulp after two years. Instead in April 2014 they started fantasy podcast Far Fetched Fables, leaving the District of Wonders with three podcasts, respectively. Far Fetched Fables was suspended in 2018 after 188 episodes because the presenter was unable to continue. Tales to Terrify was transferred to new owners, leaving StarShipSofa as the only ongoing podcast under the District of Wonders banner.

== StarShipSofa Stories ==
To celebrate the 100th episode of StarShipSofa's audio fiction magazine, an anthology of stories titled StarShipSofa Stories, Volume 1 was published, featuring fiction by Michael Moorcock, Gene Wolfe, Peter Watts, Elizabeth Bear, and others. The second volume of stories was published in October 2010 and contains fiction by Neil Gaiman, China Miéville, Mary Rosenblum, and others.

Two subsequent volumes, and a collection of stories from the Tales To Terrify horror show were later published.

== Special episodes ==
In June 2015 for Episode 389, StarShipSofa produced and adapted in audio the story "The Men of Greywater Station" co-written by George R. R. Martin and Howard Waldrop. The story was published in the anthology Songs of Stars and Shadows, published in 1977 and now out of print with no electronic copies existing and the story never previously appearing online. The story was narrated by English actor Nicholas Camm. StarShipSofa produced a YouTube video discussing the story to promote the episode.

In an interview with Boing Boing, assistant editor Jeremy Szal revealed that the author offered to post a copy of the anthology by snail mail. Shortly after the episode's launch the author himself publicly approved of the story's production and narration on his blog. YouTuber prestonjacobs created an analysis of the podcast's adaptation and the story, highlighting the similarities to the A Song of Ice and Fire canon and theorizing that all stories written by George R. R. Martin are contained in one singular universe.

== Notable Authors ==
Notable authors published in the magazine include:

- Harry Harrison
- Kevin J. Anderson
- Neal Asher
- Paolo Bacigalupi
- Kage Baker
- Elizabeth Bear
- Terry Bisson
- Aliette de Bodard
- David Brin
- Ben Bova
- Pat Cadigan
- Ted Chiang
- Cory Doctorow
- Stephen Donaldson
- Paul Di Filippo
- Jeffrey Ford
- Eugie Foster
- Karen Joy Fowler
- Neil Gaiman
- William Gibson
- Joe Haldeman
- Peter F. Hamilton
- Robin Hobb
- Hugh Howey
- Kij Johnson
- James Patrick Kelly
- Caitlín R. Kiernan
- Ted Kosmatka
- Nancy Kress
- Jay Lake
- Mark Lawrence
- David D. Levine
- Karen Lord
- Jack McDevitt
- Ian McDonald
- Will McIntosh
- Ken MacLeod
- George R. R. Martin
- China Miéville
- Michael Moorcock
- Cat Rambo
- Robert Reed
- Mike Resnick
- Alastair Reynolds
- Kim Stanley Robinson
- Mary Rosenblum
- Spider Robinson
- R. Scott Bakker
- Jason Sanford
- John Scalzi
- Norman Spinrad
- Allen Steele
- Bruce Sterling
- Eric James Stone
- Lavie Tidhar
- Harry Turtledove
- Lisa Tuttle
- Jack Vance
- Carrie Vaughn
- Peter Watts
- Tad Williams
- Gene Wolfe

== See also ==
- Science fiction
- Podcast
- Amy H. Sturgis
