= World Fantasy Award =

Literary awards for science fiction or fantasy

- Statuette used as award trophy since 2016
- Awarded for: Best fantasy works of the previous year
- Country: International
- Presented by: World Fantasy Convention
- First award: 1975
- Website: worldfantasy.org

The World Fantasy Awards are a set of awards given each year for the best fantasy fiction published during the previous calendar year. Organized and overseen by the World Fantasy Convention, the awards are given each year at the eponymous annual convention as the central focus of the event. They were first given in 1975, at the first World Fantasy Convention, and have been awarded annually since. Over the years that the award has been given, the categories presented have changed; currently World Fantasy Awards are given in five written categories, one category for artists, and four special categories for individuals to honor their general work in the field of fantasy.

The awards have been described by book critics such as The Guardian as a "prestigious fantasy prize", and one of the three most prestigious speculative fiction awards, along with the Hugo and Nebula Awards (which cover both fantasy and science fiction). World Fantasy Award nominees and winners are decided by attendees of the convention and a panel of judges, typically made up of fantasy authors. Winners receive a small trophy; through the 2015 awards it was a bust of H. P. Lovecraft designed by cartoonist Gahan Wilson. The bust was retired following that year amid complaints about Lovecraft's history of racism; a new statuette designed by Vincent Villafranca depicting a tree in front of a full moon was released in 2017. The 2024 awards were presented at the 50th convention in Niagara Falls, New York on October 20, 2024, and the 2025 awards will be presented at the 51st convention in Brighton, United Kingdom, on November 2, 2025.

== History ==
Bust of H. P. Lovecraft used as award trophy from inception through 2015

The World Fantasy Awards were established at the first World Fantasy Convention, an annual convention of professionals, collectors, and others interested in the field of fantasy, held that first year in horror writer H. P. Lovecraft's home city of Providence, Rhode Island in 1975. Winners were presented with a trophy in the form of a bust of an elongated caricature of Lovecraft designed by cartoonist Gahan Wilson, nicknamed the "Howard", which matched the theme of the first convention, "The Lovecraft Circle". As stated by Wilson in First World Fantasy Awards: An Anthology of the Fantastic, "The point of the awards was, is, and hopefully shall be to give a visible, potentially usable, sign of appreciation to writers working in the area of fantastic literature, an area too often distinguished by low financial remuneration and indifference".

At the start of the awards in 1975, seven categories were presented: Best Novel, Best Short Fiction, Best Collection, Best Artist, Special Award—Professional, Special Award—Non-professional, and Life Achievement. Only a few categories have changed since then, and no changes have been made to the rules. 1978 saw the addition of the Convention Award, a special award given for general contributions to the genre, and the only award not given every year since the beginning. The Short Fiction award was split into Short Story and Novella awards in 1982, and in 1988 the multi-author anthologies, previously eligible for the Collection award, were split into their own Best Anthology category. No changes have been made since.

Winners were presented with the H. P. Lovecraft bust through the 2015 awards; at that ceremony the presenters announced that future ceremonies will no longer use the trophy. Although controversy had arisen in recent years over Lovecraft's history of racism, no explicit reason was given for the change. A new statuette, designed by Vincent Villafranca, was announced in April 2017 to be used for the 2016 awards on. The new award, which depicts a tree in front of a full moon, was intended to evoke the use of trees and night imagery in mythology, fantasy, and horror works.

== Administration ==
World Fantasy Award nominees and winners are decided by judges and attendees of the World Fantasy Convention. A ballot is posted in June for attendees of the current and previous two conferences to determine two of the finalists, with the two most-nominated selected, and a panel of five judges adds three or more nominees before voting on the overall winner. The panel of judges is typically made up of fantasy authors, as well as other fantasy professionals and is chosen each year by the World Fantasy Awards Administration, which has the power to break ties if the judges are deadlocked. The awards administration is a subgroup of the World Fantasy Convention Board, which selects sites for upcoming World Fantasy Conventions. Both the board and the judges panel are largely made up of professionals in the field of fantasy. The judges for the 2014 awards, for example, were authors Andy Duncan, Kij Johnson, Oliver Johnson, and Liz Williams, and editor John Klima.

The nominees are announced in July, and final results are presented at the World Fantasy Convention around the end of October. The Life Achievement and Convention Awards do not list nominees, and instead have the winner announced along with the other categories' nominees. The Life Achievement winner is decided by the judges panel, while the Convention award winner, not given every year, is selected by the convention organizers. The World Fantasy Convention itself is a multi-day event with several hundred attendees taking place in a different city each year, usually in the United States but sometimes in Canada or the United Kingdom. In addition to the awards ceremony, the conventions include an art show, a dealer's room, autograph receptions, and numerous panels and discussions.

== Categories ==
The World Fantasy Awards are split into ten categories, including both awards for written works and for professionals in the field. Eligibility requirements are loosely defined: works must have been published in the prior calendar year, and professionals must still be living. All types of fantasy works are accepted, regardless of subgenre or style, though whether a given work is considered to be fantasy is left up to the discretion of the nominators and judges.

Across all categories, Ellen Datlow has both the most nominations and most wins of any nominee, with 10 wins out of 42 nominations, primarily for her anthologies. She is followed by Terri Windling with 9 out of 30 and Stephen Jones with 3 out of 28, both also mainly for editing anthologies. Jeffrey Ford has the highest number of wins after Datlow and Windling with 6 out of 14 nominations, and is tied for the highest number of fiction awards with Stephen King at four.

Categories
| Current categories | Year started | Current description |
|---|---|---|
| Novel | 1975 | Stories of 40,000 words or more |
| Long Fiction | 1982 | Stories of between 10,000 and 40,000 words |
| Short Fiction | 1975 | Stories of less than 10,000 words |
| Collection | 1975 | Collections of stories by a single author |
| Anthology | 1988 | Anthologies of stories by multiple authors |
| Artist | 1975 | Artists |
| Special Award—Professional | 1975 | Professionals in the field of fantasy |
| Special Award—Non-professional | 1975 | Non-professionals in the field of fantasy |
| Convention Award | 1978 | Peerless contributions to the fantasy genre (last awarded 2013) |
| Life Achievement | 1975 | Outstanding service to the fantasy field |

== Recognition ==
The awards have been described by book critics such as The Guardian as a "prestigious fantasy prize", and one of the three most prestigious speculative fiction awards, along with the Hugo and Nebula Awards (which cover both fantasy and science fiction). In 2010 multiple winner George R. R. Martin described winning the Hugo, Nebula, and "the prestigious World Fantasy Award" as the "triple crown". Others have also noted the award's prestige in the field, such as Tachyon Publications and 2014 Best Anthology winner Gardner Dozois. Stephen Jones of the Best New Horror series has said that winning the anthology award for their first volume in 1991 helped "establish the series among readers and some publishers" in multiple countries. Winners such as Nnedi Okorafor—Best Novel in 2011—have described the award as "one of my greatest honors as a writer". Editor and bookseller Rick Klaw in 2007, however, noted that the consensus at the time "in the bookselling community" was that winning the novel category did not have any effect on sales and did not help keep the book in print, with 57 percent of prior winners out of print, compared to 23 percent of Hugo Award winners from the same time period.

Two anthologies have been drawn from the World Fantasy Award winners: First World Fantasy Awards: An Anthology of the Fantastic in 1977, edited by Gahan Wilson and covering stories from the initial award year, and The World Fantasy Awards: Volume Two in 1980, edited by Stuart David Schiff and Fritz Leiber.

== Controversies ==
=== Graphic novels ===
At the 1991 awards, comic book The Sandman issue #19 "A Midsummer Night's Dream", scripted by Neil Gaiman and illustrated by Charles Vess, won the award for Best Short Story. It was reported that the rules were subsequently changed to prevent another comic book from winning, though the awards administration stated that comics and graphic novels were not intended to be eligible for that category, and said that "Comics are eligible in the Special Award Professional category. We never made a change in the rules."

=== H. P. Lovecraft bust ===
A minor controversy about the trophy occurred in 1984, when Donald Wandrei refused his Life Achievement award as he felt the award bust was a demeaning caricature of Lovecraft, whom he had known personally. Wandrei's rejected trophy was later recycled and given to another award winner.

A larger controversy surrounding the bust began in the 2010s, when several authors began to object to using the author H. P. Lovecraft as the symbol of the awards, given his outspoken racism, though others, such as Indian-American Lovecraft scholar and World Fantasy Award winner S. T. Joshi, claimed that Lovecraft's attitudes were not considered extreme at the time. Winners Nnedi Okorafor and China Miéville noted in 2011 that they felt conflicted about being honored by a bust of a man who hated people of color. Several authors and editors argued for the trophy to be changed, including a petition by author Daniel José Older in 2014, an editorial by The New York Review of Science Fiction editor Kevin J. Maroney arguing that it should be changed "as a courtesy to generations of writers whom the WFA hopes to honor", and 2014 Best Novel winner Sofia Samatar's acceptance speech.

In September 2014, the administrators of the World Fantasy Award announced they were "in discussion" about the future of the award trophy. In November 2015, at the 2015 awards, they announced that the Lovecraft bust would no longer be used beginning the following year. Lenika Cruz, associate editor of The Atlantic, defended the decision, stating that "Lovecraft's removal is about more than just the writer himself; it's not an indictment of his entire oeuvre". S. T. Joshi, however, expressed anger at the decision, and returned his two World Fantasy Awards and urged a boycott of the convention.
