= Hugo Award for Best Fancast =

Annual award for science fiction or fantasy

- Awarded for: The best non-professional science fiction or fantasy video or audio series published in the prior calendar year
- Presented by: World Science Fiction Society
- First award: 2012
- Most recent winner: Hugo, Girl! (Haley Zapal, Amy Salley, Lori Anderson, and Kevin Anderson)
- Website: thehugoawards.org

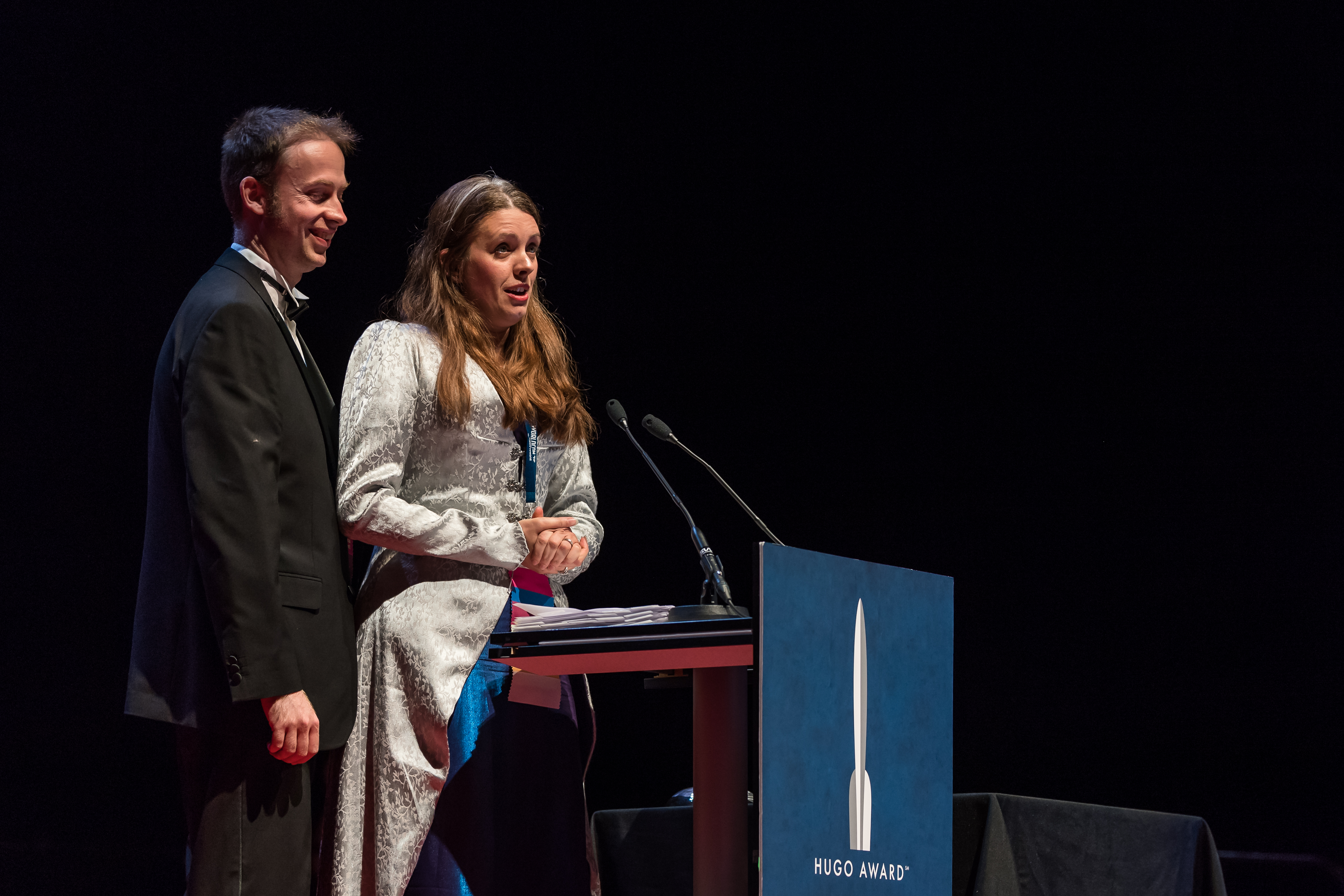
Peter and Emma Newman accepting the 2017 Hugo Award for Best Fancast

The Hugo Award for Best Fancast is one of the Hugo Awards, and is awarded to the best non-professional audio or video periodical devoted to science fiction, fantasy, or related subjects. The Hugo Awards have been described as "a fine showcase for speculative fiction" and "the best known literary award for science fiction writing".

To be eligible for the award, a fancast must have released four or more episodes by the end of the previous calendar year, at least one of which appeared in that year, and it must not qualify for the dramatic presentation category. It must also not provide or be published by an entity that provides a quarter or more of the income of any one person working on the fancast. The name of the award is a portmanteau of fan and podcast. The Hugo Award for Best Fancast was first proposed as a category after the 2011 awards, and then appeared as a temporary category at the 2012 awards. Temporary awards are not required to be repeated in following years. The 2013 awards, however, did repeat the category, and afterwards it was ratified as a permanent category.

During the 15 years the award has been active, 34 fancasts by 90 people have been finalists, and 10 of those fancasts have won. SF Squeecast, created by a team of five people, won the first two awards in 2012 and 2013, Our Opinions Are Correct, by Annalee Newitz and Charlie Jane Anders, won three times, and Hugo, Girl! by four creators has won twice. They are the only fancasts to win multiple times. The Coode Street Podcast, by Jonathan Strahan and Gary K. Wolfe, has received the most final ballot nominations at twelve, winning once, while Worldbuilding for Masochists by four creators has the most nominations without winning at six.

== Selection ==
Hugo Award nominees and winners are chosen by supporting or attending members of the annual World Science Fiction Convention, or Worldcon, and the awards presentation constitutes its central event. Supporting members are those who do not attend the convention itself, and pay a smaller membership fee as a result. The selection process is defined in the World Science Fiction Society Constitution as instant-runoff voting with six finalists, except in the case of a tie. The fancasts on the ballot are the six most-nominated by members that year, with no limit on the number of fancasts that can be nominated. Initial nominations are made by members in January through March, while voting on the ballot of six finalists is performed roughly in April through July, subject to change depending on when that year's Worldcon is held. Prior to 2017, the final ballot was five works; it was changed that year to six, with each initial nominator limited to five nominations. Worldcons are generally held near the start of September, and are held in a different city around the world each year. Members are permitted to vote "no award", if they feel that none of the finalists is deserving of the award that year, and in the case that "no award" takes the majority the Hugo is not given in that category. This happened in the Best Fancast category in 2016.

== Winners and finalists ==
In the following table, the years correspond to the date of the ceremony, rather than when the story was first published. Entries with a yellow background have won the award; those with a gray background are the other finalists.

* Winners and joint winners
+ No winner selected

Winners and finalists
Year	Fancast	Editor(s)	Ref.
2012	SF Squeecast*	Lynne M. Thomas, Seanan McGuire, Paul Cornell, Elizabeth Bear, and Catherynne M. Valente	
2012	The Coode Street Podcast	Jonathan Strahan and Gary K. Wolfe	
2012	Galactic Suburbia Podcast	Alisa Krasnostein, Alex Pierce, Tansy Rayner Roberts, Andrew Finch	
2012	SF Signal Podcast	John DeNardo, JP Frantz, and Patrick Hester	
2012	StarShipSofa	Tony C. Smith	
2013	SF Squeecast*	Elizabeth Bear, Paul Cornell, Seanan McGuire, Lynne M. Thomas, Catherynne M. Valente, and David McHone-Chase	
2013	The Coode Street Podcast	Jonathan Strahan and Gary K. Wolfe	
2013	Galactic Suburbia Podcast	Alisa Krasnostein, Alex Pierce, Tansy Rayner Roberts, Andrew Finch	
2013	SF Signal Podcast	John DeNardo, JP Frantz, and Patrick Hester	
2013	StarShipSofa	Tony C. Smith	
2014	SF Signal Podcast*	Patrick Hester	
2014	The Coode Street Podcast	Jonathan Strahan and Gary K. Wolfe	
2014	Galactic Suburbia Podcast	Alisa Krasnostein, Alex Pierce, Tansy Rayner Roberts, Andrew Finch	
2014	The Skiffy and Fanty Show	Shaun Duke, Jen Zink, Julia Rios, Paul Weimer, David Annandale, Mike Underwood, and Stina Leicht	
2014	Tea and Jeopardy	Emma Newman	
2014	Verity!	Deborah Stanish, Erika Ensign, Katrina Griffiths, L. M. Myles, Lynne M. Thomas, and Tansy Rayner Roberts	
2014	The Writer and the Critic	Kirstyn McDermott and Ian Mond	
2015	Galactic Suburbia Podcast*	Alisa Krasnostein, Alexandra Pierce, Tansy Rayner Roberts, and Andrew Finch	
2015	Adventures in SF Publishing	Brent Bower, Kristi Charish, Timothy C. Ward, and Moses Siregar III	
2015	Dungeon Crawlers Radio	Daniel Swenson, Travis Alexander, Scott Tomlin, Dale Newton, and Damien Swenson	
2015	The Sci Phi Show	Jason Rennie	
2015	Tea and Jeopardy	Emma Newman and Peter Newman	
2016	(no award)+		
2016	8-4 Play	Mark MacDonald, John Ricciardi, Hiroko Minamoto, and Justin Epperson	
2016	Cane and Rinse	Cane, Rinse	
2016	HelloGreedo	HelloGreedo	
2016	The Rageaholic	RazörFist	
2016	Tales to Terrify	Stephen Kilpatrick, Scott Silk, and Philip Oldham	
2017	Tea and Jeopardy*	Emma Newman and Peter Newman	
2017	The Coode Street Podcast	Jonathan Strahan and Gary K. Wolfe	
2017	Ditch Diggers	Mur Lafferty and Matt Wallace	
2017	Fangirl Happy Hour	Ana Grilo and Renay Williams	
2017	Galactic Suburbia Podcast	Alisa Krasnostein, Alexandra Pierce, Tansy Rayner Roberts, and Andrew Finch	
2017	The Rageaholic	RazörFist	
2018	Ditch Diggers*	Mur Lafferty and Matt Wallace	
2018	The Coode Street Podcast	Jonathan Strahan and Gary K. Wolfe	
2018	Fangirl Happy Hour	Ana Grilo and Renay Williams	
2018	Galactic Suburbia Podcast	Alisa Krasnostein, Alexandra Pierce, Tansy Rayner Roberts, and Andrew Finch	
2018	Sword and Laser	Veronica Belmont and Tom Merritt	
2018	Verity!	Deborah Stanish, Erika Ensign, Katrina Griffiths, L. M. Myles, Lynne M. Thomas, and Tansy Rayner Roberts	
2019	Our Opinions Are Correct*	Annalee Newitz and Charlie Jane Anders	
2019	Be the Serpent	Alexandra Rowland, Freya Marske, and Jennifer Mace	
2019	The Coode Street Podcast	Jonathan Strahan and Gary K. Wolfe	
2019	Fangirl Happy Hour	Ana Grilo and Renay Williams	
2019	Galactic Suburbia Podcast	Alisa Krasnostein, Alexandra Pierce, Tansy Rayner Roberts, and Andrew Finch	
2019	The Skiffy and Fanty Show	Jen Zink, Shaun Duke	
2020	Our Opinions Are Correct*	Annalee Newitz and Charlie Jane Anders	
2020	Be the Serpent	Alexandra Rowland, Freya Marske, and Jennifer Mace	
2020	Claire Rousseau's YouTube channel	Claire Rousseau	
2020	The Coode Street Podcast	Jonathan Strahan and Gary K. Wolfe	
2020	Galactic Suburbia Podcast	Alisa Krasnostein, Alexandra Pierce, Tansy Rayner Roberts, and Andrew Finch	
2020	The Skiffy and Fanty Show	Jen Zink, Shaun Duke	
2021	The Coode Street Podcast*	Jonathan Strahan and Gary K. Wolfe	
2021	Be the Serpent	Alexandra Rowland, Freya Marske, and Jennifer Mace	
2021	Claire Rousseau's YouTube channel	Claire Rousseau	
2021	Kalanadi	Rachel	
2021	The Skiffy and Fanty Show	Jen Zink, Shaun Duke, Alex Acks, Paul Weimer, and David Annandale	
2021	Worldbuilding for Masochists	Rowenna Miller, Marshall Ryan Maresca, and Cass Morris	
2022	Our Opinions Are Correct*	Annalee Newitz, Charlie Jane Anders, and Veronica Simonetti	
2022	Be the Serpent	Alexandra Rowland, Freya Marske, and Jennifer Mace	
2022	The Coode Street Podcast	Jonathan Strahan and Gary K. Wolfe	
2022	Hugo, Girl!	Haley Zapal, Amy Salley, Lori Anderson, and Kevin Anderson	
2022	Octothorpe	John Coxon, Alison Scott, and Liz Batty	
2022	Worldbuilding for Masochists	Cass Morris, Marshall Ryan Maresca, and Rowenna Miller	
2023	Hugo, Girl!	Haley Zapal, Amy Salley, Lori Anderson, and Kevin Anderson	
2023	The Coode Street Podcast	Jonathan Strahan and Gary K. Wolfe	
2023	Hugos There	Seth Heasley	
2023	Kalanadi	Rachel	
2023	Octothorpe	John Coxon, Alison Scott, and Liz Batty	
2023	Worldbuilding for Masochists	Cass Morris, Rowenna Miller, and Marshall Ryan Maresca	
2024	Octothorpe*	John Coxon, Alison Scott, and Liz Batty	
2024	The Coode Street Podcast	Jonathan Strahan and Gary K. Wolfe	
2024	Hugos There	Seth Heasley	
2024	Publishing Rodeo	Sunyi Dean and Scott Drakeford	
2024	Science Fiction Fans Buma	Buma, Liu Lu, Liu Chang	
2024	Worldbuilding for Masochists	Marshall Ryan Maresca, Cass Morris, and Natania Barron	
2025	Eight Days of Diana Wynne Jones*	Emily Tesh, Rebecca Fraimow	
2025	The Coode Street Podcast	Jonathan Strahan and Gary K. Wolfe	
2025	Hugo, Girl!	Haley Zapal, Amy Salley, Lori Anderson, and Kevin Anderson	
2025	Hugos There	Seth Heasley	
2025	A Meal of Thorns	Jake Casella Brookins	
2025	Worldbuilding for Masochists	Marshall Ryan Maresca, Cass Morris, and Natania Barron	
2026	Hugo, Girl!*	Haley Zapal, Amy Salley, Lori Anderson, and Kevin Anderson	
2026	A Meal of Thorns	Jake Casella Brookins	
2026	Eating the Fantastic	Scott Edelman	
2026	Octothorpe	John Coxon, Alison Scott, and Liz Batty	
2026	The Coode Street Podcast	Jonathan Strahan and Gary K. Wolfe	
2026	Worldbuilding for Masochists	Marshall Ryan Maresca, Cass Morris, and Natania Barron	
