= This Is Me, Jack Vance! =

Memoir of Jack Vance

The cover page of the memoir shows historic photos of the author.

This is Me, Jack Vance! is a memoir by science fiction, fantasy, and mystery author Jack Vance (August 28, 1916 – May 26, 2013) published by Subterranean Press.

== Award ==
The book won a Hugo Award for Best Related Work in 2010.

== Reception ==
Rich Horton's review of the memoir for SF Site states that the release of the memoir is helpful to science fiction fans, as "Vance has been fairly reticent about his personal life and also about his writing". Horton goes on to say the memoir has "little to say about his fiction – which Vance has long preferred to stand on its own."

Horton calls the memoir an "engaging" and "easy-going narrative, generous throughout in its depiction of the people and places Vance encounters" during his travels.
