= Hyatt Regency Chicago =

Hotel in Chicago, Illinois

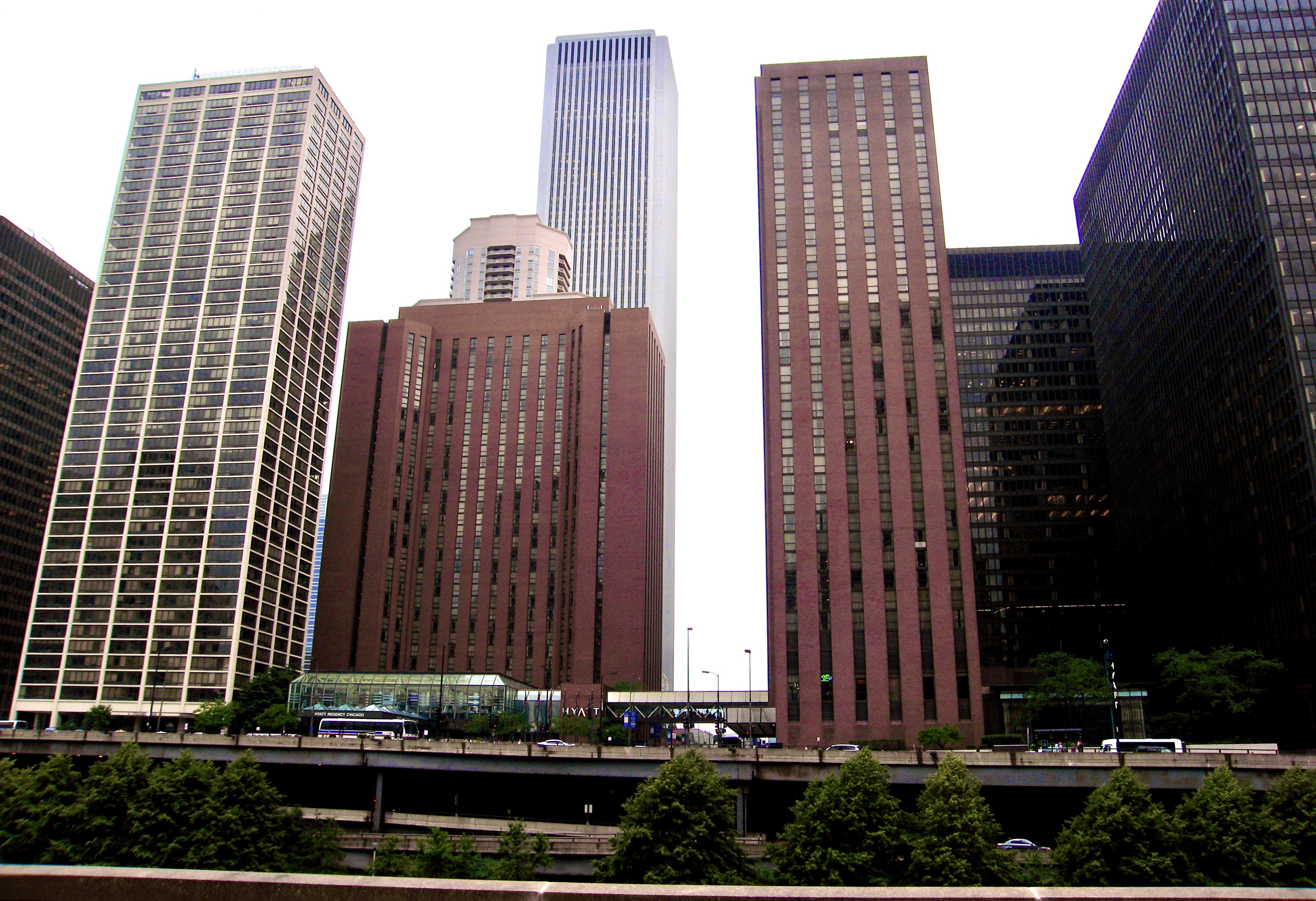
- Hyatt Regency Chicago East and West towers

- Location in Downtown Chicago
- Hotel chain: Hyatt Hotels Corporation

General information
- Location: 151 East Wacker Drive, Chicago, Illinois
- Coordinates: 41°53′14″N 87°37′19″W
- Opening: 1974 (west); 1980 (east)
- Owner: Kato International
- Operator: Hyatt Hotels Corporation

Height
- Height: 365 ft (111 m)

Technical details
- Floor count: 34 (East Tower); 36 (West Tower)

Other information
- Number of rooms: 2,032 guestrooms (including 95 suites)
- Number of restaurants: 4 (Stetsons Modern Steak + Sushi; American Craft Kitchen & Bar; Market Chicago; BIG Bar)
- Number of bars: 2 (American Craft Kitchen & Bar; BIG Bar)
- Parking: $84 Overnight Valet Parking; Self-park at 111 E Wacker Dr Garage

Website
- https://www.hyatt.com/hyatt-regency/en-US/chirc-hyatt-regency-chicago

Hyatt Regency Chicago is a full-service hotel in downtown Chicago, Illinois, operated by Hyatt Hotels Corporation. Located along East Wacker Drive near the Chicago River, it has 2,032 guest rooms as well as meeting, dining, and event facilities. After more than four decades in operation, the property underwent a major renovation in 2024.

== History ==
History The hotel officially opened in August 1974 with the West Tower. An East Tower was added in 1980, expanding capacity and forming the structure seen today with two interconnected towers. In 2024, a US$150 million renovation was completed, updating all 2,032 rooms and suites, the Regency and Crystal Ballrooms, meeting rooms, public areas (concourse, pre-function spaces), finishes, lighting, and bathrooms. Further renovations are planned (or underway) for the Grand Ballroom (24,000 sq ft) and surrounding restrooms/pre-function space, with expected completion in early 2026.

== Facilities ==
The property has 2,032 guestrooms, including about 95 suites with preferred views of the city, river, and lake. As of 2024, the hotel remains the largest hotel in Chicago and the largest Hyatt property in the world, by room count.

The hotel features four on-site restaurants and bars: Stetsons Modern Steak + Sushi, American Craft Kitchen & Bar, Market Chicago, and the BIG Bar. It offers approximately 240,000 sq ft of flexible meeting and event space, with multiple ballrooms (Regency, Crystal, Grand etc.), conference rooms, pre-function areas, and public / concourse meeting zones.
