= 66th World Science Fiction Convention =

66th Worldcon (2008)

Denvention 3, the 66th World Science Fiction Convention
- Genre: Science fiction
- Dates: 6–10 August 2008
- Venue: Colorado Convention Center
- Location: Denver, Colorado
- Country: United States
- Attendance: 3,751
- Filing status: non-profit
- Website: fanac.org/Denvention3

The 66th World Science Fiction Convention (Worldcon), also known as Denvention 3, was held on 6–10 August 2008 at the Colorado Convention Center and the Sheraton Denver Downtown Hotel in Denver, Colorado, United States.

The organizing committee was chaired by Kent Bloom.

== Participants ==
Attendance was 3,751.

=== Guests of honor ===
- Lois McMaster Bujold
- Rick Sternbach (artist)
- Tom Whitmore (fan)
- Kathy Mar (music)
- Robert A. Heinlein (ghost of honor)
- Wil McCarthy (toastmaster)

=== Other participants ===
In addition to the guests of honor, the convention has announced the names of the people participating in the convention program.

== Awards ==
The World Science Fiction Society administers and presents the Hugo Awards, the oldest and most noteworthy award for science fiction. Selection of the recipients is by vote of the Worldcon members. Categories include novels and short fiction, artwork, dramatic presentations, and various professional and fandom activities.

Other awards may be presented at Worldcon at the discretion of the individual convention committee. This has often included the national SF awards of the host country, such as the Japanese Seiun Awards as part of Nippon 2007, and the Prix Aurora Awards as part of Anticipation in 2009. The Astounding Award for Best New Writer and the Sidewise Award, though not sponsored by the Worldcon, are usually presented, as well as the Chesley Awards, the Prometheus Award, and others. In 2021, the Nommo Awards began presenting at Worldcon.

=== 2008 Hugo Awards ===
- Best Novel: The Yiddish Policemen's Union by Michael Chabon
- Best Novella: "All Seated on the Ground" by Connie Willis
- Best Novelette: "The Merchant and the Alchemist's Gate" by Ted Chiang
- Best Short Story: "Tideline" by Elizabeth Bear
- Best Related Book: Brave New Words by Jeff Prucher
- Best Dramatic Presentation, Long Form: Stardust, written by Jane Goldman & Matthew Vaughn, directed by Matthew Vaughn.
- Best Dramatic Presentation, Short Form: Doctor Who: Blink, written by Steven Moffat, directed by Hettie MacDonald.
- Best Professional Editor, Long Form: David G. Hartwell
- Best Professional Editor, Short Form: Gordon Van Gelder
- Best Professional Artist: Stephan Martinière
- Best Semiprozine: Locus, edited by Charles N. Brown, Kirsten Gong-Wong & Liza Groen Trombi
- Best Fanzine: File 770, edited by Mike Glyer
- Best Fan Writer: John Scalzi
- Best Fan Artist: Brad Foster

=== Other awards ===
- John W. Campbell Award for Best New Writer: Mary Robinette Kowal
- Special Committee Awards (not a Hugo Award): NASA, NESFA Press

== Worldcon site selection ==
At L.A.con IV, Denver won the right to host the 66th Worldcon, on the third ballot by 12 votes in one of the closest races in Worldcon site selection history.

The members of Denvention 3 selected Melbourne as the hosting city for the 68th World Science Fiction Convention, to be held in 2010.

== See also ==
- Hugo Award
- Science fiction
- Speculative fiction
- World Science Fiction Society
- Worldcon

Preceded by 65th World Science Fiction Convention; Nippon 2007 in Yokohama, Japan (2007)	List of Worldcons; 66th World Science Fiction Convention; Denvention 3 in Denver, Colorado, United States (2008)	Succeeded by 67th World Science Fiction Convention; Anticipation in Montréal, Québec, Canada (2009)
