= SF Signal =

Former blog and fanzine

- Website type: Fanzine
- Available in: English
- Owners: John DeNardo; JP Frantz
- Website: www.sfsignal.com
- Launched: 2003
- Current status: Defunct (since 2016)

SF Signal was a science fiction blog and fanzine published from 2003 to 2016. The site was launched by John DeNardo and JP Frantz and focused on writings, events, and other topics focusing on the genres of science fiction, fantasy, and other related genres. It hosted three podcasts, one of which won the 2014 Hugo Award for Best Fancast. The site itself won two Hugo Awards for Best Fanzine, 2012 and 2013.

== History ==
The website was launched in 2003 by John DeNardo and JP Frantz after they noticed a lack of blogs focusing on science fiction. They decided to launch a blog where they could discuss science fiction and related genre writings, events and ideas that were interesting to them. As the website's popularity grew, they began to incorporate more original content and hired additional staff members as well as brought in new contributors. SF Signal published three podcasts: SF Crossing the Gulf, The Three Hoarsemen, and The SF Signal Podcast.

In 2012 SF Signal won the Hugo Award for Best Fanzine. This marked the first time a fanzine won in its first year of contention and the first time an electronic fanzine of this type won the award.

In May 2016, DeNardo and Frantz announced the end of SF Signal because of the blog's increasing demands on their time.

== Content ==
It focused on topics in the science fiction genre such as literature, film, and artwork, but also addressed topics in other genres such as fantasy, young adult, and horror fiction. The site offered readers several weekly and monthly series such as book reviews, link roundups of author interviews and profiles, round table discussions on various topics (termed "Mind Melds"), links to currently free speculative fiction, contests, and notifications of various events and things that the editors found interesting.

=== Podcasts ===
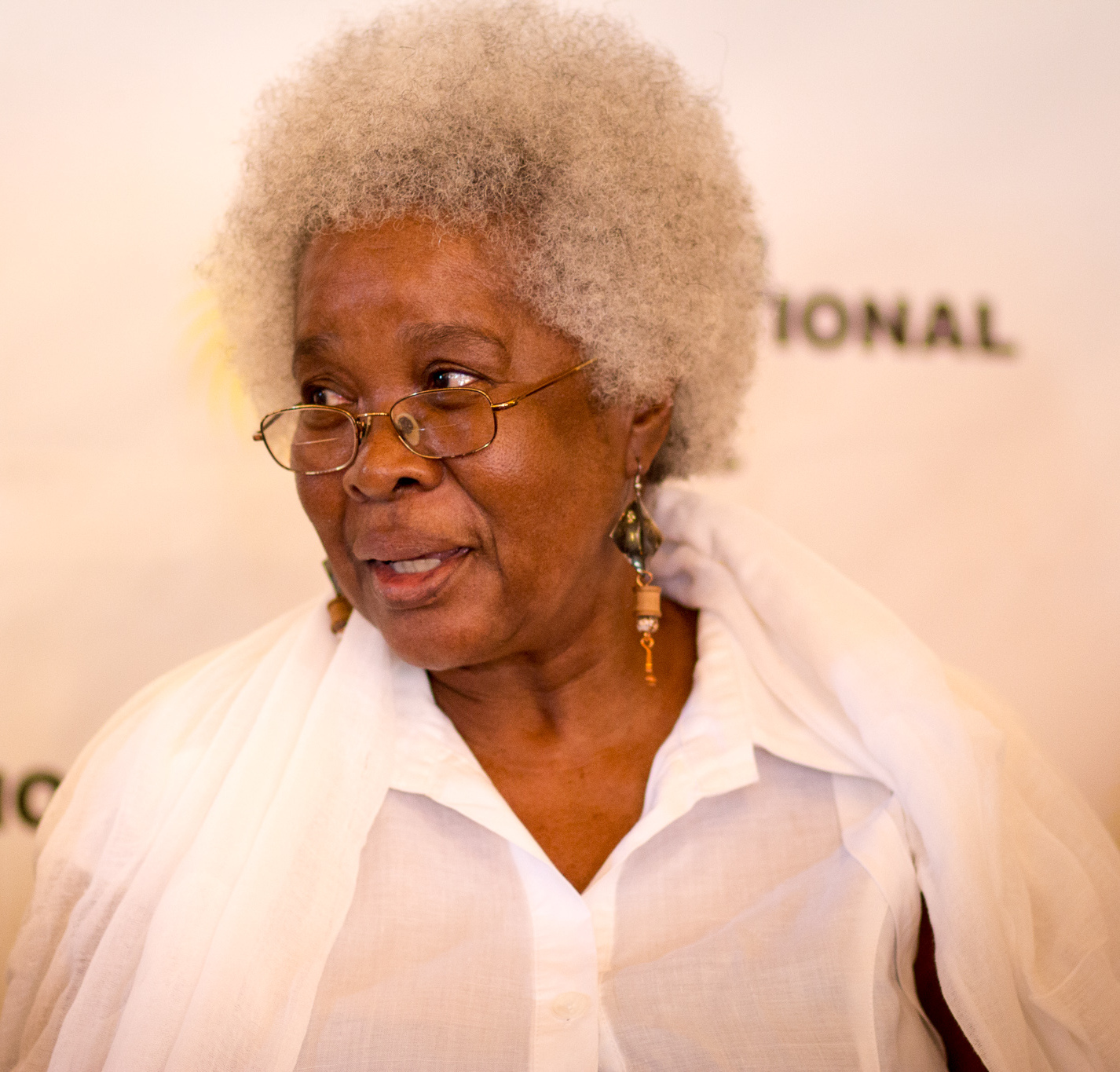
Authors discussed on SF Crossing the Gulf included Jamaican writer Erna Brodber.

SF Signal ran three podcasts during its run, The SF Signal Podcast, The Three Hoarsemen, and SF Crossing the Gulf. The SF Signal Podcast launched in August 2010 and covered topics related to science fiction, fantasy, and similar genres. It was nominated for the Hugo Award for Best Fancast in 2012 and 2013 and won the award in 2014. The podcast ran for 322 episodes, concluding with the closure of the site in 2016.

SF Crossing the Gulf began recording in July 2012 and was created to focus on science fiction literature written by international writers, with a focus on Mexican, Chinese, and Caribbean literature. Authors discussed included Ted Chiang, Erna Brodber, and Curdella Forbes. The podcast ran on SF Signal for 18 episodes until the site went defunct in 2016. Around 2018 LocusOnline opted to archive the episodes of SF Crossing the Gulf created as part of SF Signal, as the original link to the series ceased to operate. Locus also announced that hosts Karen Burnham and Karen Lord planned to create additional episodes to the series, which they would also archive.

The Three Hoarsemen was hosted by John E.O. Stevens, Fred Kiesche, and Jeff Patterson and focused on genre literature, media, pop culture, and events. The podcast had initially started with episodes 193 and 198 of The SF Signal Podcast during the summer of 2013, and on August 23 of the same year the first episode of The Three Hoarsemen aired. The podcast ran for 34 episodes with SF Signal until the site's closure, after which The Three Hoarsemen began releasing episodes through The Incomparable.

== Staff ==
During the site's run Denardo and Frantz served as its regular contributors. Other contributors included Steve Berman, Patrick Hester, and Rick Klaw. The site ran several podcasts that were hosted by Karen Burnham, Karen Lord, and Patrick Hester.

== Awards ==
- SFX Blog Award for Best Literary Blog (2011, won)
- Hugo Award for Best Fanzine (2012, won)
- Hugo Award for Best Fanzine (2013, won)
- Hugo Award for Best Fancast (2014, won for The SF Signal Podcast)
