= 67th World Science Fiction Convention =

67th Worldcon (2009)

Anticipation, the 67th World Science Fiction Convention
- Genre: Science fiction
- Dates: 6–10 August 2009
- Venue: Palais des congrès de Montréal
- Location: Montréal, Québec
- Country: Canada
- Filing status: non-profit
- Website: anticipationsf.ca

The 67th World Science Fiction Convention (Worldcon), also known as Anticipation, was held on 6–10 August 2009 at the Palais des congrès de Montréal in Montréal, Québec, Canada.

The organising committee was co-chaired by René Walling and Robbie Bourget.

This convention was also the 2009 Canvention, and therefore presented the Prix Aurora Awards.

This was the fifth Worldcon to be held in Canada, and the first one to be held in an officially French-speaking city.

== Participants ==
=== Guests of Honour ===
- Neil Gaiman
- Elisabeth Vonarburg
- Taral Wayne (fan)
- David Hartwell (editor)
- Tom Doherty (publisher)
- Julie Czerneda (toastmaster)

== Awards ==
The World Science Fiction Society administers and presents the Hugo Awards, the oldest and most noteworthy award for science fiction. Selection of the recipients is by vote of the Worldcon members. Categories include novels and short fiction, artwork, dramatic presentations, and various professional and fandom activities.

Other awards may be presented at Worldcon at the discretion of the individual convention committee. This has often included the national SF awards of the host country, such as the Japanese Seiun Awards as part of Nippon 2007, and the Prix Aurora Awards as part of Anticipation in 2009. The Astounding Award for Best New Writer and the Sidewise Award, though not sponsored by the Worldcon, are usually presented, as well as the Chesley Awards, the Prometheus Award, and others. In 2021, the Nommo Awards began presenting at Worldcon.

A number of notable science fiction and fantasy awards were presented at Anticipation.

=== 2009 Hugo Awards ===
Anticipation was the first Worldcon to include a category for graphic story on the Hugo ballot. The category filled with six nominations due to a tie for fifth place.

The 2009 Hugo Award statue base was designed by Seattle-based artist Dave Howell.

- Best Novel: The Graveyard Book by Neil Gaiman
- Best Novella: "The Erdmann Nexus" by Nancy Kress
- Best Novelette: "Shoggoths in Bloom" by Elizabeth Bear
- Best Short Story: "Exhalation" by Ted Chiang
- Best Related Book: Your Hate Mail Will Be Graded: A Decade of Whatever, 1998–2008 by John Scalzi
- Best Dramatic Presentation, Long Form: WALL-E, story by Andrew Stanton and Pete Docter; screenplay by Andrew Stanton & Jim Reardon; directed by Andrew Stanton (Pixar/Walt Disney)
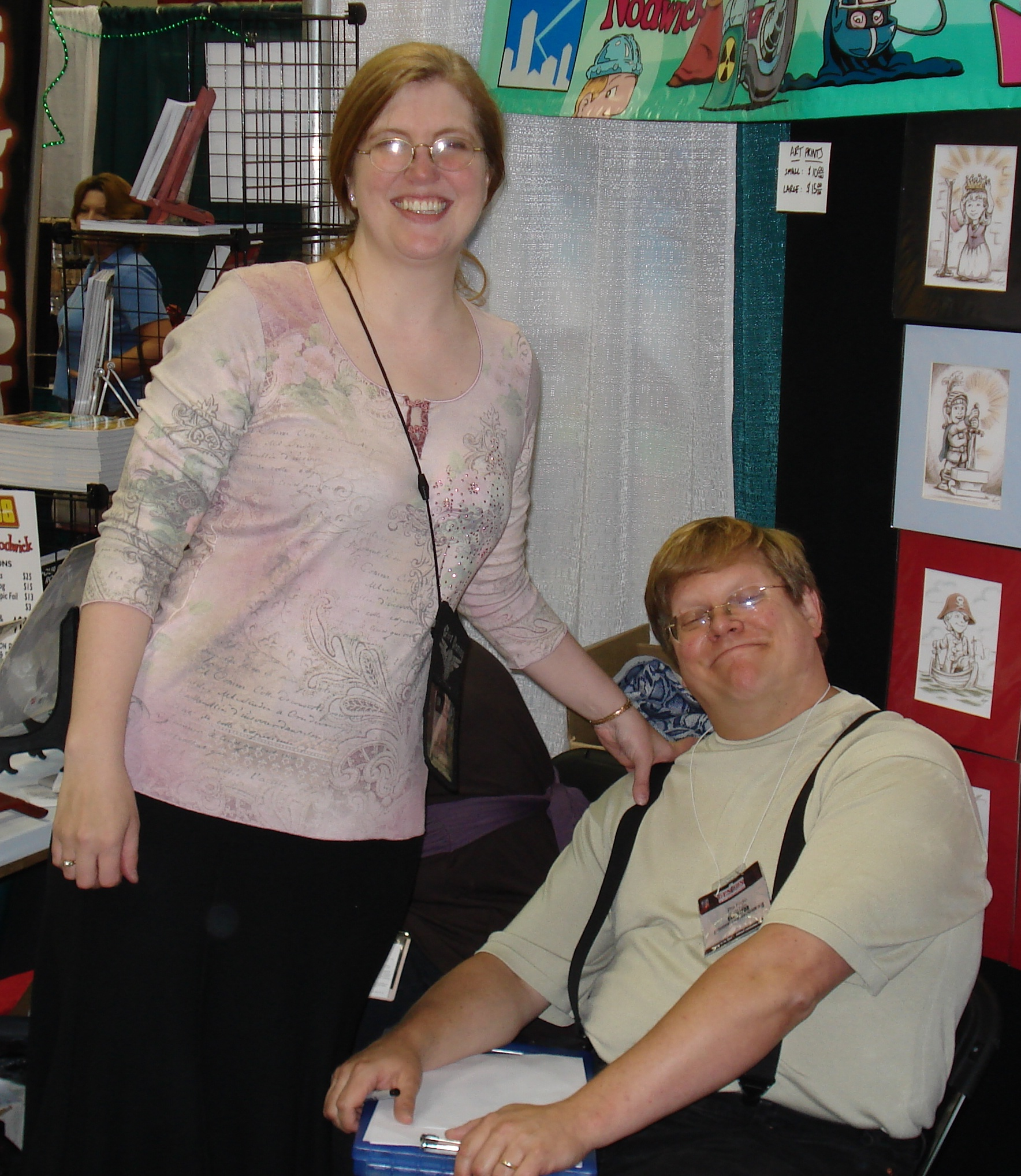
  Hugo Winners Kaja and Phil Foglio at Gen Con Indy 2007.
- Best Dramatic Presentation, Short Form: Doctor Horrible's Sing-Along Blog, written by Joss Whedon, Zack Whedon, Jed Whedon, and Maurissa Tancharoen, directed by Joss Whedon
- Best Professional Editor, Long Form: David G. Hartwell
- Best Professional Editor, Short Form: Ellen Datlow
- Best Professional Artist: Donato Giancola
- Best Semiprozine: Weird Tales, edited by Ann VanderMeer and Stephen H. Segal
- Best Fanzine: Electric Velocipede, edited by John Klima
- Best Fan Writer: Cheryl Morgan
- Best Fan Artist: Frank Wu
- Best Graphic Story: Girl Genius, Volume 8: "Agatha Heterodyne and the Chapel of Bones", written by Kaja and Phil Foglio, art by Phil Foglio, color by Cheyenne Wright

=== Prix Aurora Awards ===
This Worldcon being also the 2009 Canvention, it awarded the Prix Aurora Awards. They are given out annually for the best Canadian science fiction and fantasy literary works, artworks, and fan activities from that year, and are awarded in both English and French.

- Best Long Form: Marseguro, by Edward Willett
- Meilleur livre: Les vents de Tammerlan, by Michèle Laframboise
- Best Short Form: "Ringing in the Changes in Okotoks, Alberta", by Randy McCharles
- Meilleure nouvelle: Le Dôme de Saint-Macaire, by Jean-Louis Trudel
- Other, in English: Neo-opsis Science Fiction Magazine, Karl Johanson, editor
- Meilleur ouvrage (autre): Solaris, Joël Champetier
- Fanzine: The Original Universe, Jeff Boman, editor
- Fan (organizational): Randy McCharles (Chair of World Fantasy 2008)
- Fan (other): Joan Sherman for Heather Dale Concert (organizer)
- Artistic Achievement: Looking for Group, by Lar deSouza

=== Sidewise Awards ===
The Sidewise Award for Alternate History recognizes the best alternate history stories and novels of the year.

- Long form: Chris Roberson, The Dragon's Nine Sons
- Short form: Mary Rosenblum, "Sacrifice"

=== Other awards ===
- John W. Campbell Award for Best New Writer: David Anthony Durham

== Future site selection ==
=== Worldcon ===
In uncontested elections, the members of Anticipation selected Reno, Nevada, as the host city for the 69th World Science Fiction Convention, Renovation, to be held in 2011; and Raleigh, North Carolina, as the host city for the 10th North American Science Fiction Convention (NASFiC), ReConStruction, to be held in 2010.

=== Canvention ===
The Canadian Science Fiction and Fantasy Association selected Winnipeg, Manitoba, as the location of Canvention 2010 and the 30th Prix Aurora Awards.

== See also ==
- Hugo Award
- Science fiction
- Speculative fiction
- World Science Fiction Society
- Worldcon

Preceded by 66th World Science Fiction Convention; Denvention 3 in Denver, Colorado, United States (2008)	List of Worldcons; 67th World Science Fiction Convention; Anticipation in Montréal, Québec, Canada (2009)	Succeeded by 68th World Science Fiction Convention; Aussiecon Four in Melbourne, Australia (2010)
