= SF Squeecast =

Science fiction podcast

- In which a group of SF and Fantasy professionals squee about things SF-nal, in a never ending panel discussion of vague positivity.

Presentation
- Hosted by: Lynne M. Thomas; Seanan McGuire; Paul Cornell; Elizabeth Bear; Catherynne M. Valente
- Genre: Science Fiction
- Updates: Monthly

Publication
- Original release: June 2011 – 2015

SF Squeecast is a double Hugo-Award-winning science fiction podcast from the United States. The podcast features a group of regular contributors, Lynne M. Thomas, Seanan McGuire, Paul Cornell, Elizabeth Bear, and Catherynne M. Valente, most of whom appear on every episode, usually along with a guest contributor.

The show's strapline is "In which a group of SF and Fantasy professionals squee about things SF-nal, in a never ending panel discussion of vague positivity."

The format of the show involves each contributor bringing something to the table and explaining its appeal before inviting wider discussions from the test of the panel. Novels and TV shows are routinely discussed, but objects for discussion have included music, video games and even the Hugo Awards themselves. Having discussed each panelists' contributions the regular contributors then ask their guest a set of standard Silly Questions.

== Hugo Awards ==
SF Squeecast was nominated for, and won the inaugural and second Hugo Awards for Best Fancast in 2012 and 2013. Having won twice in a row they recused themselves from future awards.
