= Melbourne Science Fiction Club =

The Melbourne Science Fiction Club Inc. (Also known as the M.S.F.C. or colloquially "the club") was founded in May 1952 by Race Mathews, Lee Harding, Merv Binns and others under its original title of the Melbourne Science Fiction Group. It is the sixth oldest continuously active science fiction club in the world, after the Los Angeles Science Fantasy Society, and others, and the oldest outside the USA. It meets once a month in Melbourne.

== History ==
Members of the MSFC were instrumental in organising and running three World Science Fiction Conventions in Australia: Aussiecon in 1975; Aussiecon Two in 1985; and Aussiecon 3 in 1999. Current members were involved in the Aussiecon 4 Worldcon in 2010. Members have also been involved in running many of the annual versions of the Australian National Science Fiction Conventions and other regional conventions in and around Melbourne, Australia.

Many members of Australian Science fiction fandom have been members of the MSFC. Notable members/past-members of the MSFC include Merv Binns (SF fan, editor, fanzine publisher and proprietor of Australia's first specialist SF bookshop, Space Age Books) Ian Gunn, (Past president and club fanzine editor) winner of the Hugo Award for Best Fan Artist 1999, Lee Harding, Damien Broderick, Alan Stewart (secretary for 16 years and Ditmar Award winner), Cheryl Morgan (editor of the Hugo Award for Best Fanzine winning fanzine, Emerald City), Phil Wlodarczyk, Martin James Ditmar ("Dick") Jenssen (after whom the Ditmar Award is named), Bruce Gillespie (Fan Guest of Honour at the 1999 World Science Fiction Convention Aussiecon 3), John Bangsund and Race Mathews who later became a Minister in the Victorian Legislative Assembly.

The MSFC has a library of over 8,000 volumes and a huge collection of fanzines, which is currently in storage. It is listed as a special library for researchers and has a computer catalogue of approximately 5,500 titles. Work continues on the catalogue.

There have been several club fanzines including the 1950s newszine Etherline. Late in the sixties came the Somerset Gazette, until at least January 1971. After Somerset Gazette there was no official club zine in the seventies. Since 1985 the MSFC has published Ethel the Aardvark, a newszine which has won the Ditmar Award – several times under editors including Alan Stewart, Ian Gunn, and Paul Ewins – and the Chronos Award. As of October 2022, issues 1–14 and 185–216, published 1985–87 and 2017 to present, have been reprinted online.
