= Aussiecon =

Aussiecon is the name of several World Science Fiction Conventions held in Melbourne, Australia:

- The 33rd World Science Fiction Convention, known as Aussiecon, or retrospectively as Aussiecon I, was held in 1975
- The 43rd World Science Fiction Convention, known as Aussiecon Two, was held in 1985
- The 57th World Science Fiction Convention, known as Aussiecon Three, was held in 1999
- The 68th World Science Fiction Convention, known as Aussiecon Four, was held in 2010
