= North American Science Fiction Convention =

NASFiC
- Status: defunct
- Genre: Science fiction
- Location: North America
- Inaugurated: 1975
- Most recent: 2024
- Website: nasfic.org

NASFiC, an abbreviation for North American Science Fiction Convention, was a science fiction convention scheduled in North America during years when a Worldcon was being held outside North America; NASFiCs are held only during such years. Bids for the location of a NASFiC were voted on by the membership of the Worldcon (or NASFiC if it exists), the year after a non-North-American Worldcon site has been selected. As of 2014, this is one year in advance of a potential NASFiC, since Worldcon sites are chosen two years in advance.

== History ==
Activities at a NASFiC were similar to those at a Worldcon, but may differ somewhat with each convention committee. The convention may be held as an individual event or in conjunction with another convention. It generally occurred near the time of the Worldcon, but not in direct competition with it. sixteen NASFiCs occurred with the last in July 2024. The name NASFiC is owned by the World Science Fiction Society (WSFS).

The late Robert Sacks organized an attempt to separate NASFiC from the World Science Fiction Society, similar to Eurocon, but WSFS chose to keep control of NASFiC at that time. Eventually NASFiC was retired by WSFS through a WSFS constitutional amemdment approved at the 2025 and 2026 Worldcons.

== Conventions ==
This is a list of the NASFiCs held:

	Year	Name	City	Guests of Honor	Size	Corresponding Worldcon
1st	1975	NASFiC	Los Angeles, California	Harlan Ellison	1,100	33rd (Aussiecon One), Melbourne, Victoria, Australia
2nd	1979	NorthAmeriCon '79	Louisville, Kentucky	Frederik Pohl; George Scithers	2,000	37th (Seacon), Brighton, United Kingdom
3rd	1985	LoneStarCon 1	Austin, Texas	Jack Vance; Richard Powers; Joanne Burger	2,800	43rd (Aussiecon Two), Melbourne, Victoria, Australia
4th	1987	CactusCon	Phoenix, Arizona	Hal Clement; Marjii Ellers	3,000	45th (Conspiracy '87), Brighton, United Kingdom
5th	1990	ConDiego	San Diego, California	Samuel R. Delany; Ben Yalow	3,000	48th (ConFiction), The Hague, Netherlands
6th	1995	Dragon*Con 1995	Atlanta, Georgia	George Alec Effinger; Harlan Ellison; Timothy Zahn; Michael Whelan; Bjo Trimble	14,312	53rd (Intersection), Glasgow, Scotland
7th	1999	Conucopia	Anaheim, California	Jerry Pournelle; Ellen Datlow; Richard Lynch; Nicki Lynch	1,734	57th (Aussiecon Three), Melbourne, Victoria, Australia
8th	2005	Cascadia Con	Seattle, Washington	Fred Saberhagen; Liz Danforth; Toni Weisskopf; Kevin Standlee	1,785 / 2,014 on site/total	63rd (Interaction), Glasgow, Scotland
9th	2007	Archon31/Tuckercon	Collinsville, Illinois	Barbara Hambly; Darrell K. Sweet; Kevin Murphy and Bill Corbett; James Ernest; Elizabeth Covey; Barry and Sally Childs-Helton; Nancy Hathaway; Lani Tupu; Richard Hatch	1,950	65th (Nippon 2007), Yokohama, Japan
10th	2010	ReConStruction	Raleigh, North Carolina	Eric Flint; Brad W. Foster; Juanita Coulson; Toni Weisskopf	~750 / ~900 on site/total	68th (Aussiecon Four), Melbourne, Victoria, Australia
11th	2014	Detcon1	Detroit, Michigan	Steven Barnes; John Picacio; Bernadette Bosky; Arthur D. Hlavaty; Kevin J. Maroney; Helen Greiner; Bill and Brenda Sutton; Roger Sims and Fred Prophet	1,450 / 1,628 on site/total	72nd (Loncon 3), London, England
12th	2017	NorthAmeriCon '17	San Juan, Puerto Rico	Daina Chaviano; Tobias S. Buckell; George Perez; Paula Smith; Guy Consolmagno; Javier Grillo-Marxuach	~200 / ~575 on site/total	75th (Worldcon 75), Helsinki, Finland
13th	2019	SpikeCon	Layton, Utah	David Weber; Laurell K Hamilton; Susan Chang; Vincent Villafranca; Linda Deneroff; Dragon Dronet; Bjo & John Trimble	~800	77th (Dublin 2019—An Irish Worldcon), Dublin, Ireland
14th	2020	Columbus NASFiC 2020	Online (originally planned for Columbus, Ohio)	Brian Herbert; Kevin J. Anderson; Stephanie Law; Christopher J. Garcia; Marc Millis; Sue and Steve Francis; Eric Flint	0 / unknown on site/total	78th (CoNZealand), Online (originally planned for Wellington, New Zealand)
15th	2023	Pemmi-Con	Winnipeg, Manitoba, Canada	Julie E. Czerneda; Waubgeshig Rice; Nisi Shawl; John Mansfield; Philip John Currie; Lorna Toolis (posthumously, as Ghost Guest of Honor) katherena vermette George Freeman; Tanya Huff	509 / 849 on site/total	81st (2023 Chengdu), Chengdu, China
16th	2024	Buffalo NASFiC 2024	Buffalo, New York	Alan Dean Foster; Nilah Magruder; Phil and Kaja Foglio; Tony and Suford Lewis	501 / 546 on site/total	82nd (Glasgow 2024), Glasgow, Scotland
