= Brad W. Foster =

American cartoonist

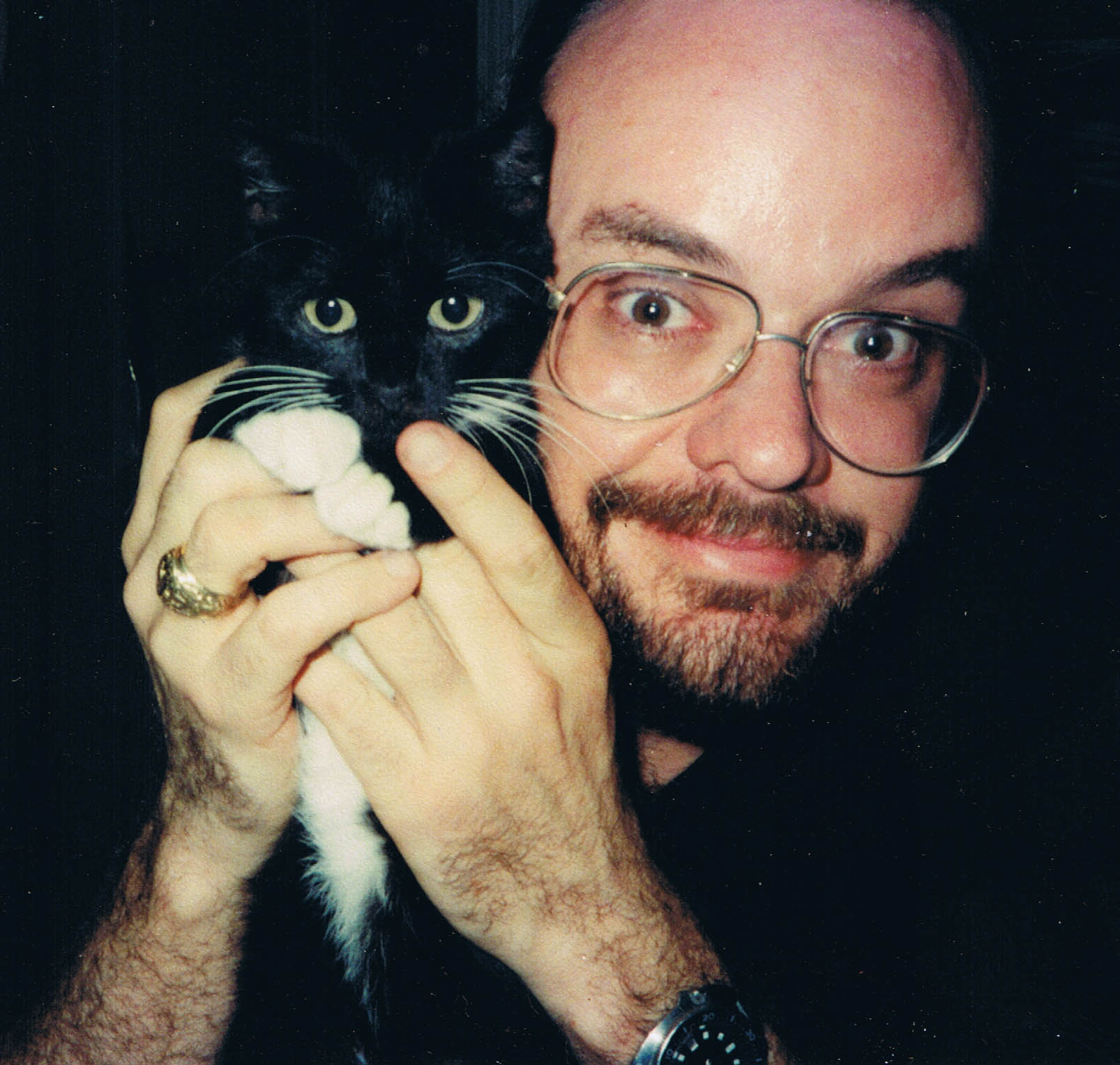
- Brad Foster with his cat Sable, 1995
- Born: April 26, 1955 (age 71)
- Occupation: Illustrator
- Known for: Hugo award-winning artist
- Website: http://www.jabberwockygraphix.com/

Brad W. Foster (born April 26, 1955) is an American illustrator, cartoonist, writer and publisher. He has also been Artist Guest of Honor at multiple conventions such as ArmadilloCon 10, Conestoga 9, Archon 35, NASFiC 2010, and 73rd World Science Fiction Convention.

== Biography ==
Foster was born in 1955 in San Antonio, Texas. In 1977, he received a bachelor's degree in environmental design from Texas A&M University, then continuing his studies for two more years at the University of Texas at Austin, concentrating on techniques of fine and commercial art.

In 1976, he founded the small press publishing company Jabberwocky Graphix, initially to print and distribute his own art and comics, although he has subsequently published the work of over 300 other artists from around the world. Among the Jabberwocky Graphix publications were some of the early minicomic format booklets, ranging from the standard 8-pager up to the thick, 375 page "One Year's Worth". Between 1987 and 1988, he wrote and drew four issues of the comic book Mechthings, which were published by Renegade Press. In the early 1990s he worked on Shadowhawk for Jim Valentino at Image Comics. For that comic he was listed in the credits as the "Big-Background Artist", which referred to his role in both penciling and inking the larger and more detailed background designs only on certain select panels and pages, rather than throughout.

From 1987 to 1991 he was a regular contributing illustrator to the science fiction magazine Amazing Stories. In 2008 he began producing illustrations for the newsletter Ansible, published by British author David Langford, creating a full color version for the on-line edition, and a different black-and-white version for the print edition. Since 2010 he has written and drawn the monthly cartoon "The Funny Business of Art" for Sunshine Artist magazine.

== Awards ==
Foster has won multiple awards for his artwork at various art festivals and conventions around the country, including twice at The Red River Revel in Shreveport, Louisiana.

- Hugo Award for Best Fan Artist
  - 2011 (won)
  - 2010 (won)
  - 2008 (won)
  - 1994 (won)
  - 1992 (won)
  - 1989 (won)
  - 1988 (won)
  - 1987 (won)
- 1988, Chesley Award from the Association of Science Fiction and Fantasy Artists for "Best Unpublished Monochrome".
- 2001, Bill Rotsler Award
- 2004, Cat Writer's Association: Muse Award - Best Series of Illustrations
- 2006, Cat Writer's Association: Muse Award - Best Series of Illustrations
- 2011, Rebel Award for his contributions for Southern fandom at FenCon/DeepSouthCon 49

Foster was the artist guest of honor for the 2010 NASFiC, ReConStruction, Conestoga 9 in 2005, and Archon 35 in 2011, and Sasquan, the 73rd World Science Fiction Convention, in 2015.

== Selected works ==
- The Adventures of Olivia #1 - 5 (co-writer/artist 1989-1996) Jabberwocky Graphix
- Altered Image #1 (inker, 1998) Image Comics
- File 770 1984 through present (covers and illustrations) Mike Glyer publisher
- Fission Chicken #1 - 4 (color finished art over pencils by J. P. Morgan) Fantagraphics
- Highlights for Children 1983 (hidden pictures page)
- Mechthings #1 - 4 (writer/artist 1987-1988) Renegade Press
- Slam Bang #1 (1985) through present (various covers, comic strips and illustrations) Fan-Atic Press
- Shadowhawk #5 - 11 ("Big Background Artist", 1993, 1994) Image Comics
