= LoneStarCon =

LoneStarCon may refer to:

- LoneStarCon 1, the 1985 North American Science Fiction Convention (NASFiC), held in Austin, Texas
- LoneStarCon 2, the 1997 World Science Fiction Convention (Worldcon), held in San Antonio, Texas
- LoneStarCon 3, the 2013 World Science Fiction Convention (Worldcon), held in San Antonio, Texas
