= 72nd World Science Fiction Convention =

72nd Worldcon (2014)

Loncon 3, the 72nd World Science Fiction Convention
- Loncon 3 logo
- Genre: Science fiction
- Dates: 14–18 August 2014
- Venue: ExCeL London
- Location: London
- Country: United Kingdom
- Attendance: 7,951
- Organizer: London 2014 Limited
- Website: loncon3.org

The 72nd World Science Fiction Convention (Worldcon), also known as Loncon 3, was held on 14–18 August 2014 at the ExCeL London in London, United Kingdom.

The convention committee was co-chaired by Alice Lawson and Steve Cooper and organized as London 2014 Limited.

== Participants ==
Attendance was 7,951, out of 10,833 paid memberships.

=== Guests of Honour ===
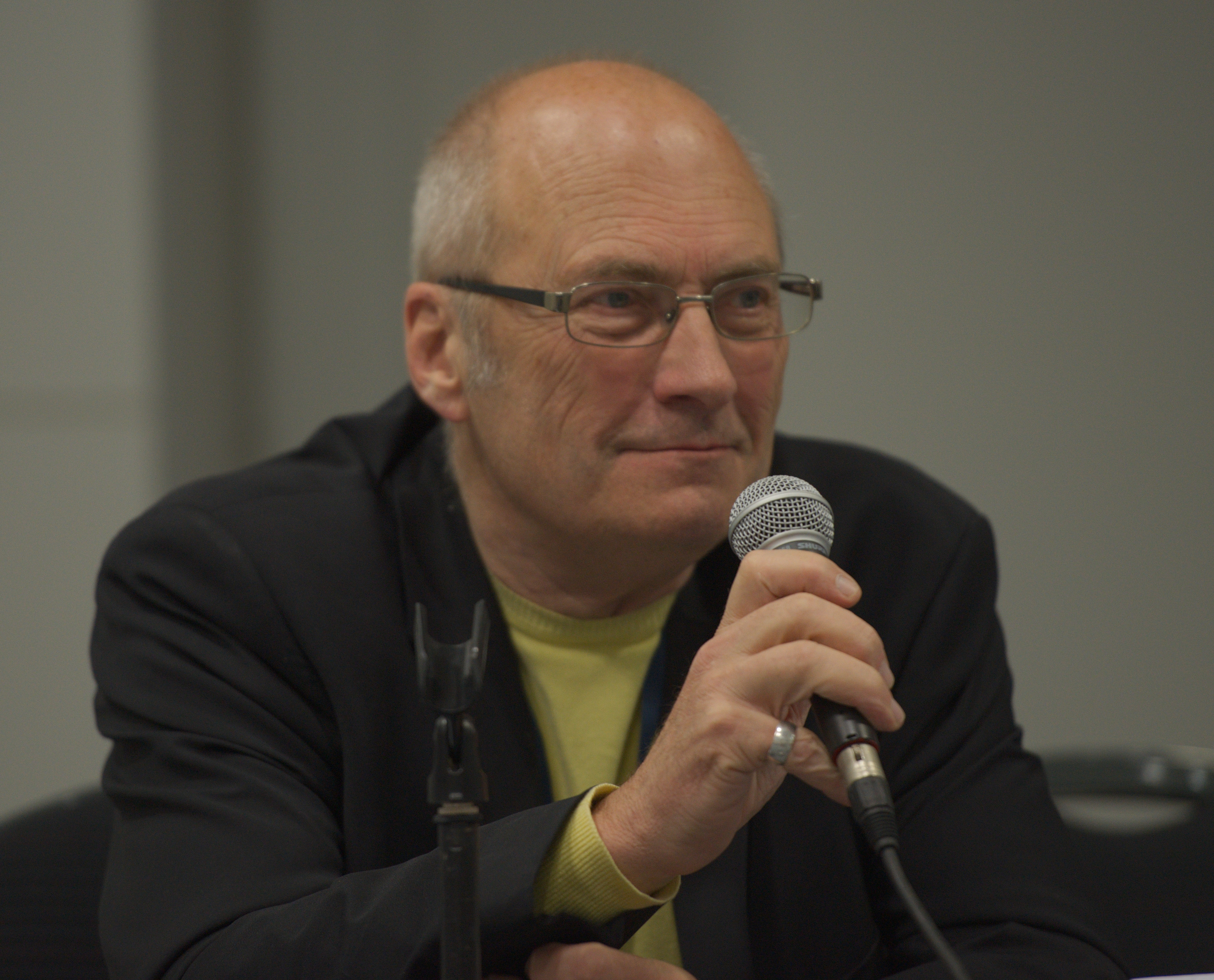
John Clute during his Guest of Honour interview.

- Iain M. Banks: a writer who received both popular and critical acclaim for his science fiction novels published over 25 years, including the Culture series, and for 15 other books published under the name Iain Banks. Banks died in June 2013, having announced just two months earlier that he had inoperable cancer.
- John Clute: a critic and writer of international renown, whose extensive work in the genre includes co-editing The Encyclopedia of Science Fiction and The Encyclopedia of Fantasy.
- Malcolm Edwards: currently Deputy CEO and publisher at the Orion Publishing Group, and who has also been a science fiction editor, critic, and writer, as well as a fan for over 40 years.
- Chris Foss: an artist whose ground-breaking images revolutionised SF paperback covers from the early 1970s and shaped the way a generation visualised science fiction.
- Jeanne Gomoll: recognised as one of the prime movers in science fiction feminism in the 1970s, and who has been influential in SF fandom as an artist, editor, writer, and organiser ever since.
- Robin Hobb: the author of five successful series of fantasy novels, in addition to earlier works written as Megan Lindholm and a collection published under both names.
- Bryan Talbot: a comics writer and artist whose career of over 30 years in the field includes the creation of the first British graphic novel, The Adventures of Luther Arkwright.

== Programming and events ==
=== Masquerade ===
The Loncon 3 masquerade was held on 16 August. The winners, across four experience-based categories, were:

==== Young Fan division ====
- Best Time Traveler: "Alberta Gear" by Tali Semo
- Most Beautiful and Coolest: "Elsa" by Nicole Keller
- Most Original and Creative: "Lost and Found" by Olivia and Eleah Flockhart
- Special Judge's Award: "Elsa" by Nicole Keller

==== Novice division ====
- Most Creepy: "The Slender Man" by Andrew Wishart
- Best Recreation: "70's Doctor Who Monsters" by Christine Halse and Joseph Halse
- Honourable Mention for Fabric Manipulation: "Fish Pond" by Emma Roberts
- Best Workmanship: "Puff & Perry on the Other Side of Boring" by Petra Kufner and Antje Brand
- Best Presentation: "Tribal" by Rebecca Lale
- Best in Class (Group): "Puff & Perry on the Other Side of Boring" by Petra Kufner and Antje Brand
- Best in Class (Solo): "Tribal" by Rebecca Lale

==== Journeyman division ====
- Judge's Favourite: "Life is a Dream" by Loretta and Tim Morgan
- Best Workmanship: "A Glamorous Evening of Galactic Domination" (Dalek ball gown costume) by Jennifer Skwarski
- Best Presentation: "A Message from the Ministry of Magic" by Sabine Furlong
- Best in Class: "Coliseum" by Peter Westhead

==== Master division ====
- Most Beautiful: "The Odyssey Dress" by Miki Dennis
- Workmanship and Attention to Detail: "We Dance" by Laura Hunt
- Best Workmanship: "Aratalindalë" (Vala from The Silmarillion) by Ian Spittlehouse, Maggie Percival, Mike Percival, Marcus Streets, Liz Caldwell, Alex Davidson, Lawrence Percival and Helen Armstrong
- Best Presentation: "Aratalindalë" (Vala from The Silmarillion) by Ian Spittlehouse, Maggie Percival, Mike Percival, Marcus Streets, Liz Caldwell, Alex Davidson, Lawrence Percival and Helen Armstrong

==== Overall ====
- Best in Show: "Aratalindalë" by Ian Spittlehouse et al.

== Awards ==
The World Science Fiction Society administers and presents the Hugo Awards, the oldest and most noteworthy award for science fiction. Selection of the recipients is by vote of the Worldcon members. Categories include novels and short fiction, artwork, dramatic presentations, and various professional and fandom activities.

Other awards may be presented at Worldcon at the discretion of the individual convention committee. This has often included the national SF awards of the host country, such as the Japanese Seiun Awards as part of Nippon 2007, and the Prix Aurora Awards as part of Anticipation in 2009. The Astounding Award for Best New Writer and the Sidewise Award, though not sponsored by the Worldcon, are usually presented, as well as the Chesley Awards, the Prometheus Award, and others. In 2021, the Nommo Awards began presenting at Worldcon. The 1939 Retro Hugos were presented in 2014 to honor the 75th anniversary of the 1st World Science Fiction Convention.

The convention received 3,587 valid ballots for the 2014 Hugo Awards and 1,307 for the 1939 Retro Hugo Awards. Both figures are record participation by members in these awards. More than 99% of the ballots were cast online with just 16 by postal mail for the 2014 awards and 12 for the 1939 awards. Authors Mary Robinette Kowal and Rob Shearman hosted the Retro Hugo Award ceremony.

On 1 March 2014, the convention committee announced that comedian Jonathan Ross would be the host of the Hugo Award Ceremony; this choice was met with some controversy, and directly led to Farah Mendlesohn's decision to resign from the committee. Ross subsequently tweeted that he was withdrawing from hosting the ceremonies. Authors Geoff Ryman and Justina Robson were later named as hosts for the ceremony.

=== 2014 Hugo Awards ===
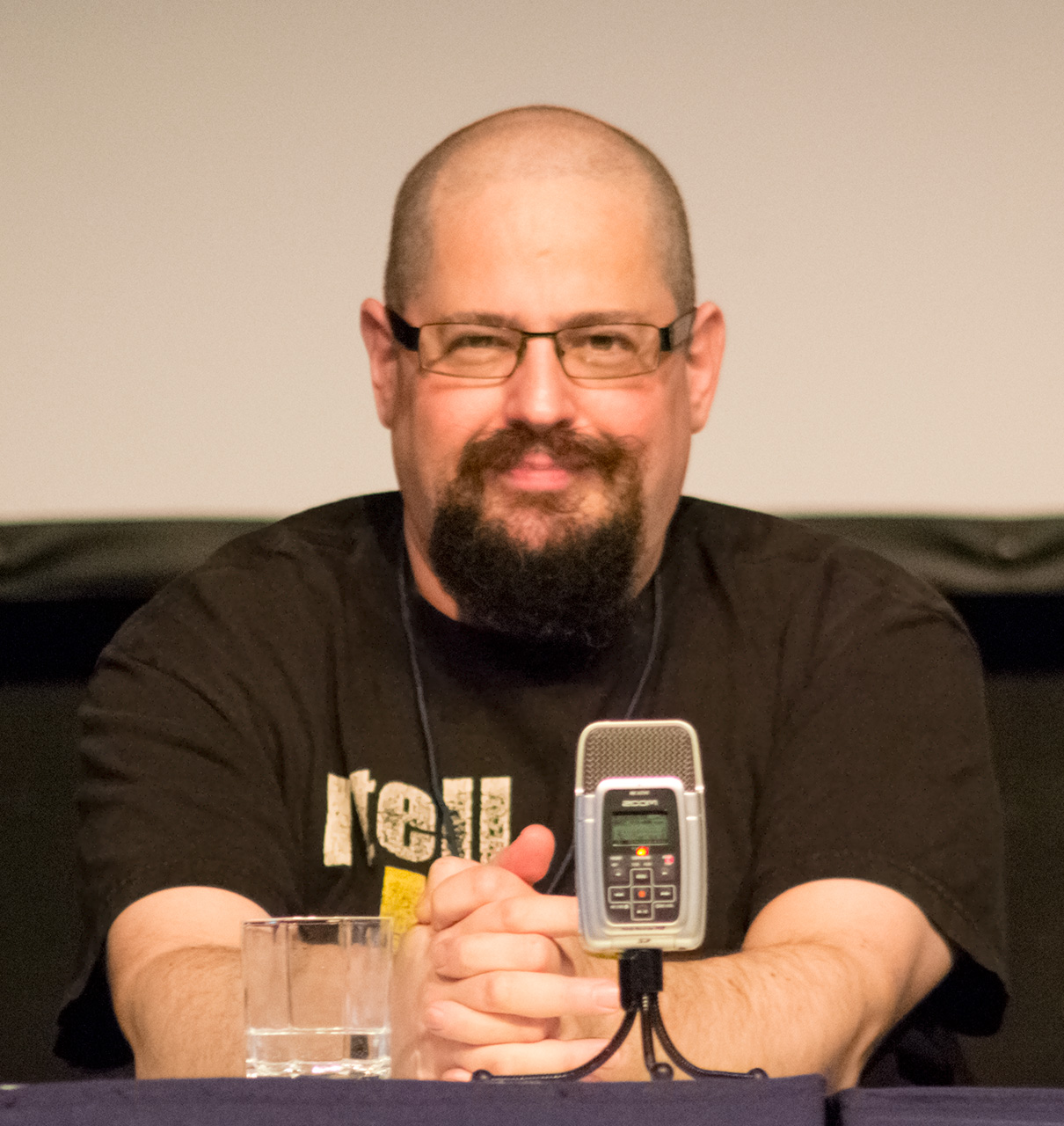
Best Novella winner Charles Stross

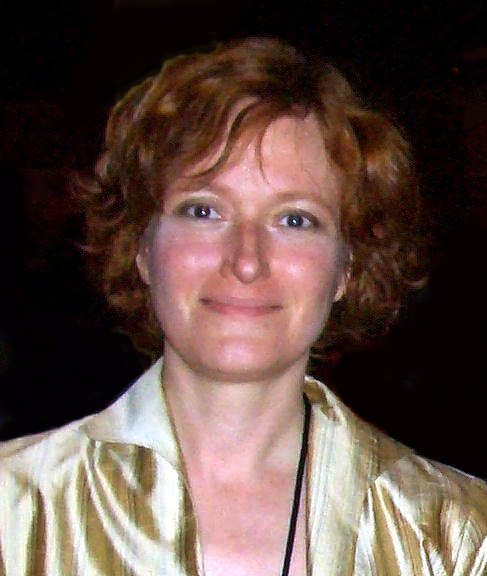
Best Novelette winner Mary Robinette Kowal

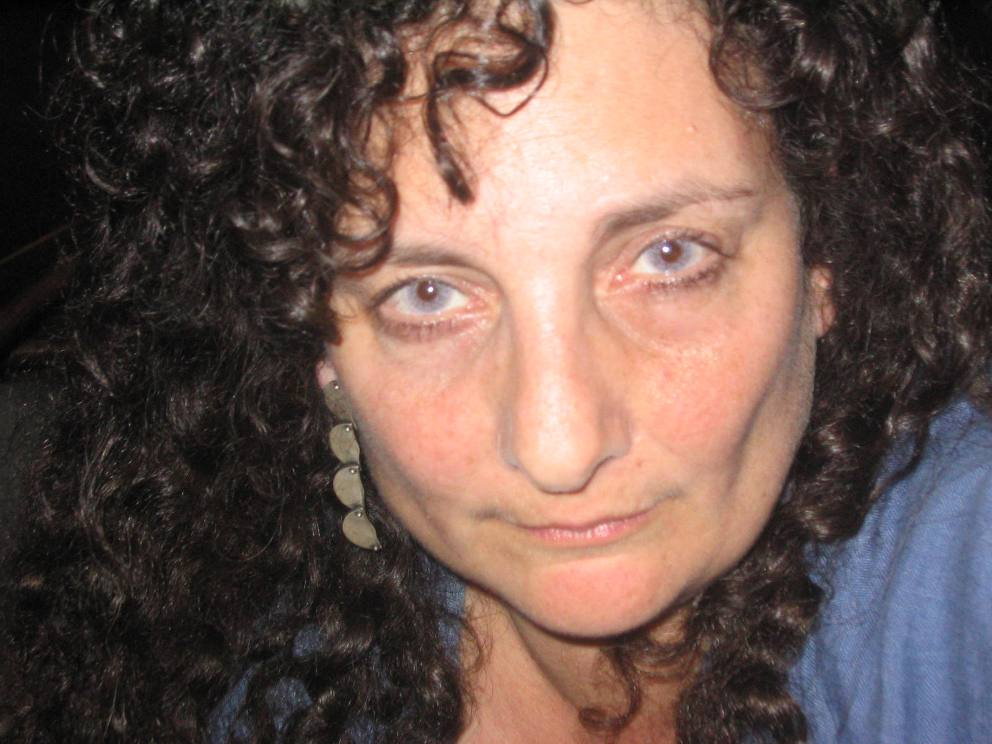
Best Professional Editor, Short Form winner Ellen Datlow

- Best Novel: Ancillary Justice by Ann Leckie
- Best Novella: "Equoid" by Charles Stross
- Best Novelette: "The Lady Astronaut of Mars" by Mary Robinette Kowal
- Best Short Story: "The Water That Falls on You from Nowhere" by John Chu
- Best Related Work: We Have Always Fought: Challenging the Women, Cattle and Slaves Narrative by Kameron Hurley (A Dribble of Ink)
- Best Graphic Story: Time, written by Randall Munroe, art by Randall Munroe
- Best Dramatic Presentation, Long Form: Gravity, screenplay by Alfonso Cuarón and Jonás Cuarón; directed by Alfonso Cuarón (Esperanto Filmoj/Heyday Films/Warner Bros.)
- Best Dramatic Presentation, Short Form: Game of Thrones, "The Rains of Castamere", screenplay by David Benioff and D. B. Weiss, original novel by George R. R. Martin, directed by David Nutter (HBO)
- Best Professional Editor, Long Form: Ginjer Buchanan
- Best Professional Editor, Short Form: Ellen Datlow
- Best Professional Artist: Julie Dillon
- Best Semiprozine: Lightspeed Magazine, edited by John Joseph Adams, Rich Horton, and Stefan Rudnicki
- Best Fanzine: A Dribble of Ink, edited by Aidan Moher
- Best Fancast: SF Signal Podcast by Patrick Hester
- Best Fan Writer: Kameron Hurley
- Best Fan Artist: Sarah Webb

=== 1939 Retro Hugo Awards ===
- Best Novel: The Sword in the Stone by T. H. White
- Best Novella: "Who Goes There?" by John W. Campbell (as "Don A. Stuart")
- Best Novelette: "Rule 18" by Clifford D. Simak
- Best Short Story: "How We Went to Mars" by Arthur C. Clarke
- Best Dramatic Presentation: The War of the Worlds by H. G. Wells, written for radio by Howard E. Koch and Anne Froelick, directed by Orson Welles (The Mercury Theatre on the Air/CBS)
- Best Professional Editor: John W. Campbell
- Best Professional Artist: Virgil Finlay
- Best Fanzine: Imagination!, edited by Forrest J Ackerman, Myrtle Rebecca "Morojo" Douglas, and T. Bruce Yerke
- Best Fan Writer: Ray Bradbury
- Special Committee Award: Jerry Siegel and Joe Shuster, creators of Superman

=== Other awards ===
- Big Heart Award: Vincent Docherty
- First Fandom Hall of Fame Award: John Clute
- First Fandom Posthumous Hall of Fame Award: Ted Carnell and Walter Gillings
- Sam Moskowitz Award for Excellence in Collecting: Mike Ashley
- John W. Campbell Award for Best New Writer: Sofia Samatar

== Staff ==
Loncon 3 was co-chaired by Alice Lawson and Steve Cooper. Division heads included Helen Montgomery for Events, Farah Mendlesohn for Exhibits, Mike Scott for Facilities, Eemeli Aro for Hospitality, Nigel Furlong for Logistics, James Bacon for Programme, Nicholas Whyte for Promotions, Kees Van Toorn for Publications, and Carolina Gómez Lagerlöf for Services.

== Site selection ==
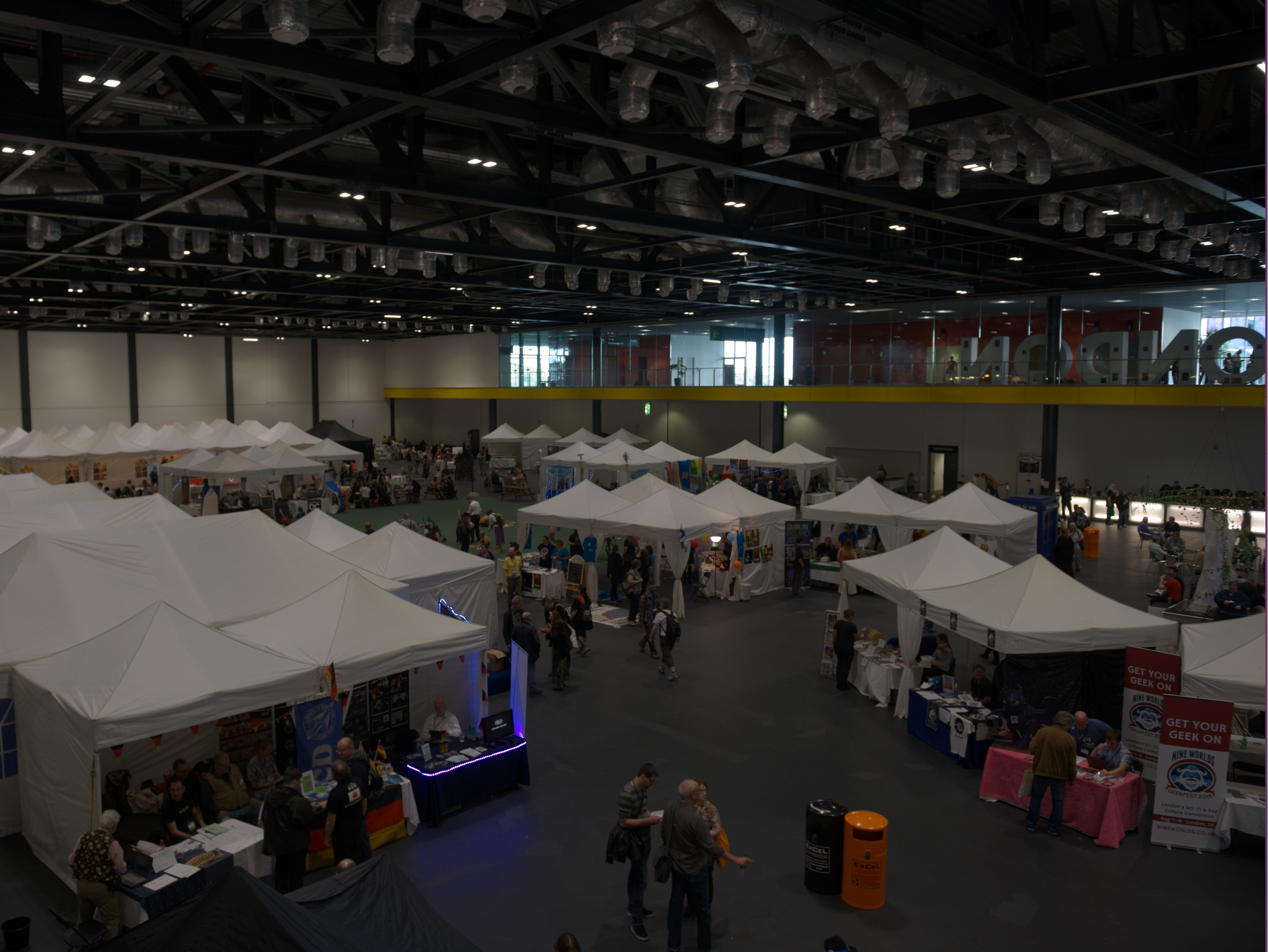
The Loncon fan village, where the bids had their tables and bid parties.

At the March 2012 filing deadline, only one committee who had announced a bid to hold the 72nd World Science Fiction Convention had filed the required paperwork to be on the site selection ballot. That bid, "London in 2014", was chaired by Steve Cooper and Mike Scott.

London's bid to host the Worldcon was formally unopposed and won in balloting among the members of the 70th World Science Fiction Convention held in Chicago, Illinois, in 2012. With 932 ballots cast, the voting breakdown was 864 votes for London, 29 ballots expressed no preference, and there were 39 write-in votes for various sites, including "Peggy Rae's House", Phoenix, Stockholm, and Tonopah, Nevada.

As a result of London's win, a vote for the 11th North American Science Fiction Convention to be held in 2014 took place at the 71st World Science Fiction Convention in San Antonio, Texas, in 2013. Of the two announced bids, Detroit's bid was certified as the winner with 231 votes over a Phoenix bid that garnered 210 votes. The Detroit convention was named Detcon1.

=== Future site selection ===
Two committees announced bids and qualified to be on the site selection ballot for the 74th World Science Fiction Convention: "KC in 2016" for 17–21 August 2016, in Kansas City, Missouri, and "Beijing in 2016" for 14–19 August 2016, at the National Convention Center in Beijing, China. The 2016 site selected by the voters, Kansas City, was announced during the convention's final World Science Fiction Society business meeting on Sunday, 17 August 2014.

== See also ==
- Hugo Award
- Science fiction
- Speculative fiction
- World Science Fiction Society
- Worldcon

Preceded by 71st World Science Fiction Convention; LoneStarCon 3 in San Antonio, Texas, United States (2013)	List of Worldcons; 72nd World Science Fiction Convention; Loncon 3 in London, UK (2014)	Succeeded by 73rd World Science Fiction Convention; Sasquan in Spokane, Washington, United States (2015)
