= Conucopia =

- Genre: Science fiction/Fantasy
- Venue: Anaheim Marriott
- Locations: Anaheim, California
- Country: United States
- Inaugurated: August 26–29, 1999
- Attendance: 1,734
- Organizer: S.C.I.F.I., Inc.

Conucopia was the seventh North American Science Fiction Convention, held in Anaheim, California, on August 26–29, 1999, at the Anaheim Marriott. This NASFiC was held because Melbourne, Australia, was selected as the location for the 1999 Worldcon.

== Guests of honor ==
- Jerry Pournelle, pro
- Ellen Datlow, editor
- Richard Lynch, fan
- Nicki Lynch, fan

== Information ==
=== Site selection ===
After "Australia in '99" was selected over the "Worldcon in Zagreb 1999" bid as the World Science Fiction Convention to be held in 1999 (as "Aussiecon Three" in Melbourne), the 1996 WSFS Business Meeting directed that a written ballot election be held to select a NASFiC site for 1999. For the first time, both at-con and by-mail balloting were possible as this NASFiC site selection election was held one full year after the overseas Worldcon site was selected.

At the 1997 Worldcon in San Antonio, Texas, a total of 491 ballots were cast, 101 by mail and 390 in person, with Los Angeles barely edging Phoenix after the first round but no site claiming a majority of the vote. It wasn't until the third round of "instant runoff" preferential vote tallying that the Los Angeles area bid was awarded the 1999 NASFiC.

=== Committee ===
- Chair: Christian B. McGuire
- Facilities: Bobbi Armbruster
- Administration: Elayne Pelz
- Programming: Noel Wolfman
- Operations: Robbie Bourget
- Volunteers: James Briggs
- Webmaster: Chaz Boston Baden

=== Events ===
Conucopia was dedicated by the committee to the memory of Los Angeles-area fan Gary Louie (1957–1999) who died on February 2, 1999, of a heart attack.

=== Notable program participants ===
Program participants highlighted by the convention included Harlan Ellison, Babylon 5 creator J. Michael Straczynski, authors David Brin, Larry Niven, and Harry Turtledove, plus Warner Books editor Betsy Mitchell.

== See also ==
- World Science Fiction Society

Preceded by 6th North American Science Fiction Convention; Dragon*Con 1995 in Atlanta, GA, United States (1995)	List of NASFiCs; 7th North American Science Fiction Convention; Conucopia in Anaheim, CA, United States (1999)	Succeeded by 8th North American Science Fiction Convention; Cascadia Con in Seattle, United States (2005)
