= CactusCon (disambiguation) =

CactusCon was the fourth North American Science Fiction Convention, held in Phoenix, Arizona, on September 3–7, 1987.

CactusCon may also refer to:

- CactusCon (computer security conference), a computer security conference held annually in Mesa, Arizona
- Cactus Con, fictional subject of "The Great Cactus Con", an episode of Henry Danger
