= Archon (convention) =

- Status: Active
- Genre: Multi-genre
- Venue: Gateway Center
- Location: Collinsville, Illinois
- Country: United States
- Inaugurated: 1977
- Organizer: St. Louis Science Fiction, Ltd
- Website: http://www.archonstl.org/

Archon is a multigenre convention that has been held annually in Collinsville, Illinois and is hosted by St. Louis Science Fiction, Ltd. It is the largest convention of its type in the St. Louis, Missouri area, bringing a few thousand fans of science fiction, fantasy and horror each year. Archon is held at the beginning of October.

== Past highlights ==
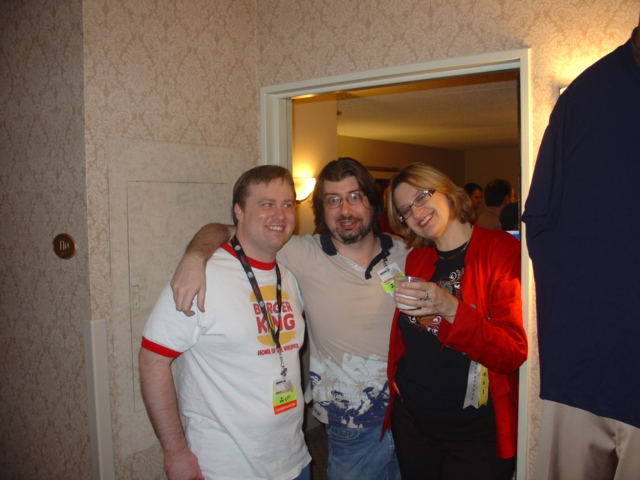
Members enjoy Archon 30

The first Archon in 1977 drew a crowd of 253 and was held at Stouffer's Riverfront Towers (now the Millennium) in downtown St. Louis. In 1982 Archon 6 brought author Stephen King and attracted 1,750 participants to the Chase Park Plaza Hotel. The convention had a ten-year run at the now-defunct Henry VIII Hotel near Lambert Airport. In 1993, it settled in its current home at the Gateway Center in Collinsville. Archon 20's guest of honor, author Ray Bradbury, attracted record attendance of more than 2,500 convention-goers in 1996. In 2003 Archon 27 expanded from three days to four. Archon 30 attracted nearly 2,800 convention-goers in 2006, a record for the convention.

In 2007 in place of Archon, convention organizers hosted Tuckercon, the 9th North American Science Fiction Convention. The convention was held two months earlier than the normal Archon, on August 2–5, 2007. Guests of honor included Barbara Hambly, Darrell K. Sweet, and Mystery Science Theater 3000 personalities Kevin Murphy and Bill Corbett (replacing Mira Furlan, who had to cancel).

== Masquerade ==
Archon hosts one of the best known masquerade competitions in the country. In 2005, over 50 entries were presented in four separate classes, Junior, Novice, Journeyman and Master. These costumers represent a wide range of fandom, presenting recreations of favorite cinema and literary characters along with original creations. Until his death author Vic Milan was the emcee of the Archon Masquerade for many years. Kevin Dulle was chosen by Vic Milan as his successor after having worked as the Archon Stage Manager for 20 years. The masquerade is unique for its team of professional light and sound engineers who volunteer their time working with the presenters for the show. The Archon Masquerade rules are compatible with the International Costumers' Guild guidelines for competition, which means that any major awards won at Archon are included in standings at other ICG convention competitions.

== Gaming ==
Archon features extensive gaming. Among some of the many attractions at Archon gaming are LARPing, Battletech games, Science Fiction RPGs ran yearly, D&D games and CCG tournaments.

== Tax ruling ==
In 1985, St. Louis Science Fiction Ltd. was subject to an adverse court tax court ruling that denied it non-profit 501(c)(3) status, on the basis that it was not "operated exclusively for exempt purposes", but instead "in part, for the private benefit of artists and dealers", and "in furtherance of substantial nonexempt commercial, and social and entertainment purposes".

== See also ==
- Henry VIII Hotel
- Science fiction fandom
- List of multigenre conventions

Preceded by 8th North American Science Fiction Convention; Cascadia Con in Seattle, United States (2005)	List of NASFiCs; 9th North American Science Fiction Convention; Archon 31 in St. Louis, United States (2007)	Succeeded by 10th North American Science Fiction Convention; ReConStruction in Raleigh, North Carolina, United States (2010)
