= 55th World Science Fiction Convention =

55th Worldcon (1997)

LoneStarCon 2, the 55th World Science Fiction Convention
- Genre: Science fiction
- Dates: 28 August–1 September 1997
- Venue: Henry B. Gonzalez Convention Center
- Location: San Antonio, Texas
- Country: United States
- Attendance: 4,634
- Organizer: Austin Literary Arts Maintenance Organization, Inc.
- Filing status: 501(c)(3) non-profit
- Website: alamo-sf.org/lonestarcon2

The 55th World Science Fiction Convention (Worldcon), also known as LoneStarCon 2, also known as "The Second Occasional LoneStarCon Science Fiction Convention & Chili Cook-off", was held on 28 August–1 September 1997 at the Marriott Rivercenter, Marriott Riverwalk, and the Henry B. Gonzalez Convention Center in San Antonio, Texas, United States. The first LoneStarCon, held in Austin, Texas, had been the North American Science Fiction Convention (NASFiC) in 1985, when the 43rd Worldcon was held in Australia.

The supporting organization was the Austin Literary Arts Maintenance Organization (ALAMO). The chairman was Karen Meschke.

== Participants ==
Attendance was 4,634, out of 5,614 paid memberships.

=== Guests of honor ===
- Algis Budrys (pro)
- Michael Moorcock (pro)
- Don Maitz (artist)
- Roy Tackett (fan)
- Neal Barrett, Jr. (toastmaster)

== Awards ==
The World Science Fiction Society administers and presents the Hugo Awards, the oldest and most noteworthy award for science fiction. Selection of the recipients is by vote of the Worldcon members. Categories include novels and short fiction, artwork, dramatic presentations, and various professional and fandom activities.

Other awards may be presented at Worldcon at the discretion of the individual convention committee. This has often included the national SF awards of the host country, such as the Japanese Seiun Awards as part of Nippon 2007, and the Prix Aurora Awards as part of Anticipation in 2009. The Astounding Award for Best New Writer and the Sidewise Award, though not sponsored by the Worldcon, are usually presented, as well as the Chesley Awards, the Prometheus Award, and others. In 2021, the Nommo Awards began presenting at Worldcon.

=== 1997 Hugo Awards ===
- Best Novel: Blue Mars by Kim Stanley Robinson
- Best Novella: "Blood of the Dragon" by George R. R. Martin
- Best Novelette: "Bicycle Repairman" by Bruce Sterling
- Best Short Story: "The Soul Selects Her Own Society: Invasion and Repulsion: A Chronological Reinterpretation of Two of Emily Dickinson's Poems: A Wellsian Perspective" by Connie Willis
- Best Non-Fiction Book: Time and Chance: an Autobiography by L. Sprague de Camp
- Best Dramatic Presentation: "Severed Dreams" (Babylon 5 episode)
- Best Professional Editor: Gardner Dozois
- Best Professional Artist: Bob Eggleton
- Best Semiprozine: Locus, edited by Charles N. Brown
- Best Fanzine: Mimosa, edited by Nicki Lynch & Rich Lynch
- Best Fan Writer: Dave Langford
- Best Fan Artist: William Rotsler

=== Other awards ===
- John W. Campbell Award for Best New Writer: Michael A. Burstein

== See also ==
- Hugo Award
- Science fiction
- Speculative fiction
- World Science Fiction Society
- Worldcon

Preceded by 54th World Science Fiction Convention; L.A.con III in Anaheim, California, United States (1996)	List of Worldcons; 55th World Science Fiction Convention; LoneStarCon 2 in San Antonio, Texas, United States (1997)	Succeeded by 56th World Science Fiction Convention; BucConeer in Baltimore, Maryland, United States (1998)
