= NASFiC (1975) =

- Genre: Science fiction/Fantasy
- Venue: Los Angeles Airport Marriott
- Location: Los Angeles
- Country: United States
- Inaugurated: Labor Day weekend 1975
- Attendance: 1,100

NASFiC, held in Los Angeles, on Labor Day weekend 1975, at the Los Angeles Airport Marriott, was the first North American Science Fiction Convention. "NASFiC" was an initialism for North American Science Fiction Convention. This "Continental Convention", the first of its kind, was held because Melbourne, Australia, was selected as the location for the 1975 Worldcon.

== Guests of honor ==
- Harlan Ellison, Guest of Honor
- Lester del Rey, Toastmaster

== Information ==
=== Site selection ===
After the 1975 Worldcon was awarded to a site in Australia, Los Angeles was chosen as the site for the first Continental Convention at Torcon II, the 31st World Science Fiction Convention, in Toronto, Canada. The bid led by Chuck Crayne defeated a bid led by Bruce Pelz, also for Los Angeles in 1975, at an "unofficial" site selection meeting.

=== Committee ===
- Chair: Chuck Crayne

=== Events ===
Johnny Weissmuller, Buster Crabbe, Jock Mahoney, and James Pierce—four of the actors to have portrayed Tarzan—participated in a "Tarzan Club" reunion as part of a commemoration of the 100th anniversary of Edgar Rice Burroughs' birth. Several of the actresses that have portrayed Jane, including Eve Brent, Joyce MacKenzie, and Louise Lorraine, were also part of the celebration.

== See also ==
- World Science Fiction Society

Preceded by N/A	List of NASFiCs; 1st North American Science Fiction Convention; NASFiC in Los Angeles, United States (1975)	Succeeded by 2nd North American Science Fiction Convention; NorthAmeriCon '79 in Louisville, KY, United States (1979)
