= 73rd World Science Fiction Convention =

73rd Worldcon (2015)

Sasquan, the 73rd World Science Fiction Convention
- Genre: Science fiction
- Dates: August 19-23, 2015
- Venue: Spokane Convention Center
- Location: Spokane, Washington
- Country: United States
- Organizer: Seattle Westercon Organizing Committee
- Website: http://sasquan.org/

The 73rd World Science Fiction Convention (Worldcon), also known as Sasquan, was held on August 19–23, 2015 at the Spokane Convention Center in Spokane, Washington, United States.

The convention was chaired by Sally Woehrle.

== Participants ==
=== Guests of honor ===
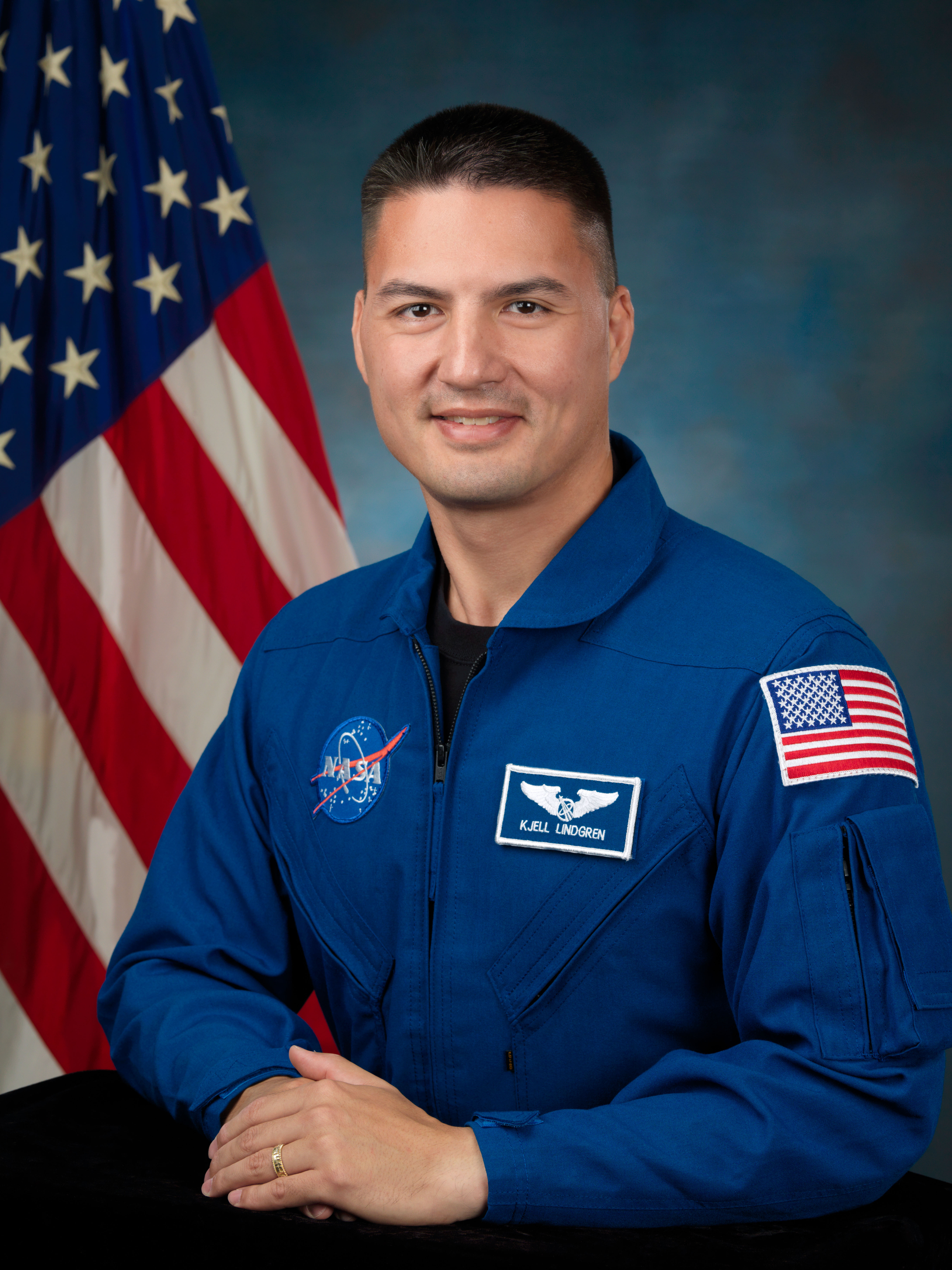
Special Guest Kjell Lindgren.

- artist Brad Foster
- author David Gerrold
- author Vonda McIntyre
- filker Tom Smith
- fan Leslie Turek

NASA astronaut Kjell Lindgren participated from Earth orbit as Sasquan's Special Guest while aboard the International Space Station.

== Programming and events ==
=== Masquerade ===
The Sasquan masquerade was held in the First Interstate Center for the Arts (then known as the INB Performing Arts Center), on same campus as the Convention Center, in the evening of Friday, August 21. There were 45 entrants competing for ten major awards. The Sasquan Masquerade Director was Sharon Sbarsky. Kevin Roche was the master of ceremonies and the judges were Brad W. Foster, David Gerrold, Sandy Pettinger, Kathy Sanders, and Syd Weinstein. The workmanship judges were Tanglwyst de Holloway and Michele Weinstein.

The winners, across four experience-based categories, were:

==== Young Fan division ====
- Best Comic: "Ms. Marvel" by Sashti Ramadorai
- Best Media: "Arya Stark" by Alexis Davis
- Best in Class: "Emma Swan" by Melinda Kilbourne

==== Novice division ====
Workmanship awards:

- Honorable Mention: "Red" by Megan
- Best Use of Traditional Materials: "San" (Princess Mononoke) by Casandra Friend
- Best Woodworking Magic: "Ashe and Lux" (League of Legends) by Rachelle Henning and Tori Wheeler
- Best Accessory: "Fauntal" by Ashlee
- Best Use of Recycled Materials: "Immortan Joanna" by Claire Stromberg
- Judge's Choice (de Holloway): "Octopus Dress" by Desiree Gould
- Judge's Choice (Weinstein): "Don't Blink" by Paulina Crownhart and Julia Buragino
- Rising Star Award: "We Are Groot" by Jason Giddings
- Best in Class: "We Are Groot" by Jason Giddings

Presentation awards:

- Honorable Mention: "Don't Blink" by Paulina Crownhart and Julia Buragino
- Dead Ringer Award: "The Captain" (Captain Kangaroo) by Robert Mitchell
- Best Re-Creation: "Immortan Joanna" by Claire Stromberg
- Best in Class: "We Are Groot" by Jason Giddings

==== Journeyman division ====
Workmanship awards:

- Honorable Mention: "Luigi" by Bevan Rogers
- Honorable Mention (Transformation): "Diana Prince/Wonder Woman" by Denise Tanaka
- Best Use of Non-Traditional Materials: "Sleeping Beauty, the Vintage Edition" by Hal Bass, Sharon Bass, Barbara Galler-Smith, Janine Wardale, John Wardale, and Ita Vandenbroek
- Best Use of Materials That Hate You: "Theia the Tabbybrook Mage" by Natalie Rogers
- Best Patterning and Fitting: "Marian Keiffer" by Debi "7 of Eowyn" Schwartz
- Worst Infection of the Beading Disease: Tie:-
  - "Doctor Who Time Lords" by Carol Hamill and Forrest Nelson
  - "Victorian Justice League" by Barbara Hoffert, Mark Ezell, Ellie Ezell, Ann Ezell, Zachary Brant, and Kathryn Brant
- Rising Star Award: "Blood Dragon Lord" by Lesli Jones
- Best in Class: "Blood Dragon Lord" by Lesli Jones

Presentation awards:

- Most Beautiful: "Marian Keiffer" by Debi "7 of Eowyn" Schwartz
- Best Re-Creation: "Doctor Who Time Lords" by Carol Hamill and Forrest Nelson
- Best in Class: "Blood Dragon Lord" by Lesli Jones

==== Master division ====
Workmanship awards:

- Best Use of a Sweater Pattern: "Knit Klingon Warrior" by Shael Hawman
- Best Use of Light Refraction: "Dreams of a Rainbow" by Susan Torgerson and Chris Corbitt
- Best Use of Shower Accessories: "Rainbow Jellyfish" by Orchid Cavett
- Best Dyeing: "Senator Padmé Amidala" by Torrey Stenmark
- Most Skill-Sets in a Single Bound: "Professor R. Miles Levell, Gentleman Time Traveler" by Richard Miles
- Go Big or Go Home Award: "Princess Marshmallow" by Lance Ikegawa
- Rising Star Award: Tie:-
  - "Knit Klingon Warrior" by Shael Hawman
  - "Rainbow Jellyfish" by Orchid Cavett

Presentation awards:

- Honorable Mention: "Rainbow Jellyfish" by Orchid Cavett
- Honorable Mention: "Senator Padmé Amidala" by Torrey Stenmark
- Best Critter: "Roll for Initiative" by Jonnalyn Wolfcat, Melissa Quinn, Alita Quinn, and Anita Taylor
- Most Beautiful: "Princess Marshmallow" by Lance Ikegawa
- Best in Class: "Professor R. Miles Levell, Gentleman Time Traveler" by Richard Miles

==== Overall ====
- Best in Show (workmanship): "Roll for Initiative" by Jonnalyn Wolfcat et al.
- Best in Show (presentation): "Victorian Justice League" by Barbara Hoffert, Ann Ezell, Mark Ezell, Kathryn Brant, Zach Brant, Ellie Ezell

== Awards ==
The World Science Fiction Society administers and presents the Hugo Awards, the oldest and most noteworthy award for science fiction. Selection of the recipients is by vote of the Worldcon members. Categories include novels and short fiction, artwork, dramatic presentations, and various professional and fandom activities.

Other awards may be presented at Worldcon at the discretion of the individual convention committee. This has often included the national SF awards of the host country, such as the Japanese Seiun Awards as part of Nippon 2007, and the Prix Aurora Awards as part of Anticipation in 2009. The Astounding Award for Best New Writer and the Sidewise Award, though not sponsored by the Worldcon, are usually presented, as well as the Chesley Awards, the Prometheus Award, and others. In 2021, the Nommo Awards began presenting at Worldcon. Of the 2,122 valid nominating ballots, 2,119 were submitted online and 3 on paper. The year's final ballot was dominated by slates organized as the "Sad Puppies" and "Rabid Puppies". The controversy brought international press attention to the awards process and caused several nominees to withdraw from consideration. However, only one slate candidate won an award, and in the five categories in which only slate candidates were nominated, no award was given.

=== 2015 Hugo Awards ===
- Best Novel: The Three-Body Problem, by Cixin Liu, translated by Ken Liu (Tor Books)
- Best Novella: no award
- Best Novelette: "The Day the World Turned Upside Down", by Thomas Olde Heuvelt (Lightspeed Magazine, April 2014)
- Best Short Story: no award
- Best Related Work: no award
- Best Graphic Story: Ms. Marvel, "Volume 1: No Normal", written by G. Willow Wilson, illustrated by Adrian Alphona and Jake Wyatt (Marvel Comics)
- Best Dramatic Presentation, Long Form: Guardians of the Galaxy, written by James Gunn and Nicole Perlman; directed by James Gunn
- Best Dramatic Presentation, Short Form: Orphan Black, "By Means Which Have Never Yet Been Tried", written by Graham Manson, directed by John Fawcett (Temple Street Productions, Space/BBC America)
- Best Professional Editor, Long Form: no award
- Best Professional Editor, Short Form: no award
- Best Professional Artist: Julie Dillon
- Best Semiprozine: Lightspeed Magazine, edited by John Joseph Adams, Wendy N. Wagner, Stefan Rudnicki, Rich Horton, and Christie Yant
- Best Fanzine: Journey Planet, edited by James Bacon, Chris Garcia, Alissa McKersie, Colin Harris, and Helen Montgomery
- Best Fancast: Galactic Suburbia Podcast, by Alisa Krasnostein, Alexandra Pierce, Tansy Rayner Roberts (presenters) and Andrew Finch (producer)
- Best Fan Writer: Laura J. Mixon
- Best Fan Artist: Elizabeth Leggett

=== Art Show Awards ===
- Best Convention Theme: "Whatever Happened to Bigfoot" by Sandra Ackley
- Best 3D Non-Jewelry: "Just Keeping an Eye on Things" by Mark Chapman
- Best 3D Jewelry: "Lapis Dragon" by Arlin Robins
- Best 2D Color: "The Dala Horse" by Julie Dillon
- Best 2D Monochrome: "Othello" by M. Scott Hammond
- Judges Choice: "Resurrection of Perspective" by Andy VanOverberghe
- Body of Work: Andy VanOverberghe
- Staff Choice: "Tracking a Giant" by Jeff Sturgeon
- Fan Choice: "Tang Horse" by Elizabeth Berrien
- GOH Choice: "Circles of Quanta 2" by Andy VanOverberghe

=== Other awards ===
- John W. Campbell Award for Best New Writer: Wesley Chu
- Special Committee Award: Jay Lake
- First Fandom Hall of Fame award: Julian May, Margaret Brundage (posthumous), Bruce Pelz (posthumous), F. Orlin Tremaine (posthumous)
- Sam Moskowitz Archive Award: David Aronovitz
- Forrest J. Ackerman Big Heart Award: Ben Yalow

== Staff ==
After the "Spokane in 2015" bid chaired by Alex von Thorn won the site selection vote, Sally Woehrle and Bobbie DuFault were announced as co-chairs of the convention on behalf of the Seattle Westercon Organizing Committee. DuFault died suddenly on the morning of September 14, 2013. The convention announced that Sally Woehrle would serve as chair with Glenn Glazer, Pierre Pettinger, and Mike Willmoth as vice-chairs.

== Site selection ==
The location was selected on August 31, 2013, by the members of the 71st World Science Fiction Convention in San Antonio, Texas.

Three committees announced bids and qualified to be on the site selection ballot for the 73rd World Science Fiction Convention:

- Helsinki in 2015, bid chair Eemeli Aro, would be held August 6-10, 2015
- Orlando in 2015, bid chair Adam Beaton, would be held September 2-6, 2015
- Spokane in 2015, bid chair Alex von Thorn, would be held August 19-23, 2015

The first contested Worldcon selection since the 2007 vote for the 2009 Worldcon site saw active campaigning and drew celebrity endorsements. Authors George R. R. Martin and Cory Doctorow publicly supported the Helsinki bid and encouraged their fans to vote while artist Phil Foglio declared his support for Spokane's bid and artist Bob Eggleton declared his support for Orlando.

Spokane won the site selection contest on the third round of ballot counting in Australian-style preferential balloting. Spokane finished with 645 votes, gaining a majority over Helsinki with 610. Orlando was dropped in the second round with 307 votes and "none of the above" had been eliminated in the first round. Boston, Minneapolis, and Locust Grove, Virginia, each received multiple write-in votes with Pyongyang and other hoax sites receiving single write-in votes.

=== Future site selection ===
Four committees announced bids to host the 75th World Science Fiction Convention and filed all of the required paperwork by the February 2015 deadline: "Nippon in 2017", "Montréal in 2017", "Helsinki in 2017", and "Washington D.C. in 2017". The 2017 site selected by the voters was announced during the convention's third World Science Fiction Society business meeting, on Saturday, August 22, 2015. With 1363 votes out of 2625 valid ballots, Helsinki won on the first ballot and will operate as "Worldcon 75". DC17 ran second with 878 votes, Montréal third with 228, and Nippon fourth with 120.

== See also ==
- Hugo Award
- Science fiction
- Speculative fiction
- World Science Fiction Society
- Worldcon

Preceded by 72nd World Science Fiction Convention; Loncon 3 in London, UK (2014)	List of Worldcons; 73rd World Science Fiction Convention; Sasquan in Spokane, Washington, United States (2015)	Succeeded by 74th World Science Fiction Convention; MidAmericon II in Kansas City, Missouri, United States (2016)
