= 74th World Science Fiction Convention =

74th Worldcon (2016)

MidAmeriCon II, the 74th World Science Fiction Convention
- Genre: Science fiction
- Dates: 17–21 August 2016
- Venue: Bartle Hall Convention Center
- Location: Kansas City, Missouri
- Country: United States
- Organizer: Mid American Science Fiction and Fantasy Conventions, Inc.
- Filing status: 501(c)(3) non-profit
- Website: midamericon2.org

The 74th World Science Fiction Convention (Worldcon), also known as MidAmeriCon II, was held on 17–21 August 2016 at the Bartle Hall Convention Center in Kansas City, Missouri, United States. The convention's name, by established Worldcon tradition, follows after the first MidAmeriCon, the 34th World Science Fiction Convention, held in Kansas City in 1976.

The convention was organized by Mid American Science Fiction and Fantasy Conventions, Inc., and was chaired by Ruth Lichtwardt and co-chaired by Diane Lacey.

== Participants ==
=== Guests of honor ===
- Artist Kinuko Y. Craft
- Author Tamora Pierce
- Author Michael Swanwick
- Editor Patrick Nielsen Hayden
- Editor Teresa Nielsen Hayden
- Pat Cadigan (toastmaster)

== Programming and events ==
The convention included a film festival, charity auctions, concerts, readings, discussion panels, workshops, and other programming.

=== Masquerade ===
The MidAmeriCon II masquerade was held on Friday, 19 August, with 34 entrants. Gregory de Danann was the Masquerade Director and the master of ceremonies was John Hertz. The judges were Tanglewyst de Holloway, Karen Schnaubelt, and Kathy Pepmiller for performance, and Jill Eastlake and Aurora Celeste for workmanship.

The winners, across four experience-based categories, were:

==== Young Fan division ====
- Most Adorable: "Young Sherlock" by Zachary Rohwer
- More Most Adorable: "Ding" (Doctor Who) by Grayson Rohwer

==== Novice division ====
Workmanship awards:

- Honorable Mention for Carving: "Mystogan" (Fairy Tail) by Jacob Lemon-Rogers, Jonathan Kunkee, Loren Kunkee, and Lyndsey Luther
- Honorable Mention for Puff Patterns: "Rambo Brite" by Gene Bennett
- Honorable Mention for Puppetry: "Sarabi, the Gryphon" by Ashley Bilke.
  - Ashley Bilke was also awarded the Silicon Web Costumers Guild Dreamcatcher Award at this event.
- It Lights up and Spins Award: "Raymond J. Stanz, Apparition Eliminator" (Steampunk Ghostbuster) by Zachary Miles
- Best Fur Work: "Pooch" by Kathy Hinkle
- Best in Class: "Mythological Loki" by Sarah Sanders

Performance awards:

- Best Novice Humor: "Rambo Brite" by Gene Bennett
- Best in Class: "Victorian Twilight Sparkle" (My Little Pony: Friendship Is Magic) Rosemary Williams

==== Journeyman division ====
Workmanship awards:

- Painting the Roses Red Award: "When Queens Collide" (The Red Queen from Alice in Wonderland and the Queen of the Night from Mozart's The Magic Flute) by Janine Wardale, Theresa Halbert and Thor Halbert
- Best in Class: "Cinderella" (based on artwork by Kinuko Y. Craft) by Sheryl Nance-Durst

Performance awards:

- Best Humor: "Flight of the Valkyries" by Sharon Bass, Christine Brockway, Chris O'Halloran and Sara Vanderbroek (singing).
- Best in Class: "When Queens Collide" by Janine Wardale and Theresa Halbert

==== Master division ====
Workmanship awards:

- Honorable Mention for Beadwork: "A Paid Political Announcement" (Flash Gordon for president) by Kevin Hewett and Rebecca Hewett
- Best Execution of Concept: "Boots Upgraded" (Cyberman) by Jennifer Skwarski
- Best in Class: "Tri Morrignae" (Irish mythology) by Jennifer Old-d'Entremont, Bethany Padron and Megan McQueen

Performance awards:

- Best Master Humor: "Sharknado" by Amanda Arthur-Struss and Joe Struss
- Honored for Excellence in Presentation: "Tri Morrignae" (Irish mythology) by Jennifer Old-d'Entremont, Bethany Padron and Megan McQueen
- Best in Class: "Flights of Fantasy" (history of flight in SF literature) by Tim Morgan, Lorretta Morgan, Iain Miller, Meredith Hines and Russ Miller

==== Overall ====
- Judges' Choice Award: "Spirits of the Tea" (based on artwork by Kinuko Y. Craft) by Sallie Abba, Greg Abba, Robert A. Cook, Rachelle Hrubetz, Leslie Roth and Tal Roth
- Best in Show: "Troll Bridge" by Susan Eisenhour, Joyce Blakesley, Isabell Robinson, Quincy Robinson, Paul Elmer, Kate Elmer, Freya Elmer, Juliet Elmer, Darrin Blom, Richard Blom and Margaret Blom

== Awards ==
The World Science Fiction Society administers and presents the Hugo Awards, the oldest and most noteworthy award for science fiction. Selection of the recipients is by vote of the Worldcon members. Categories include novels and short fiction, artwork, dramatic presentations, and various professional and fandom activities.

Other awards may be presented at Worldcon at the discretion of the individual convention committee. This has often included the national SF awards of the host country, such as the Japanese Seiun Awards as part of Nippon 2007, and the Prix Aurora Awards as part of Anticipation in 2009. The Astounding Award for Best New Writer and the Sidewise Award, though not sponsored by the Worldcon, are usually presented, as well as the Chesley Awards, the Prometheus Award, and others. In 2021, the Nommo Awards began presenting at Worldcon. MidAmeriCon II also presented Retro-Hugos for the calendar year 1940, on the 75th anniversary of the 3rd World Science Fiction Convention held in Denver because, having not yet been established, no Hugo Awards were presented in 1941.

=== 2016 Hugo Awards ===
The 74th World Science Fiction Convention, MidAmeriCon II, announced the winners of the 2016 Hugo Awards at a ceremony on the evening of Saturday, 20 August 2016. The ceremony was hosted by Toastmaster, Pat Cadigan, assisted by Jan Siegel. 3,130 valid final ballots were received and counted. The 2016 Hugo Award trophy base was designed by Sara Felix.

- Best Novel: The Fifth Season, by N. K. Jemisin (Orbit)
- Best Novella: "Binti", by Nnedi Okorafor (Tor.com)
- Best Novelette: "Folding Beijing", by Hao Jingfang, translated by Ken Liu (Uncanny Magazine, Jan-Feb 2015)
- Best Short Story: "Cat Pictures Please", by Naomi Kritzer (Clarkesworld, January 2015)
- Best Related Work: no award
- Best Graphic Story: The Sandman: Overture, written by Neil Gaiman, art by J.H. Williams III (Vertigo)
- Best Dramatic Presentation, Long Form: The Martian, screenplay by Drew Goddard, directed by Ridley Scott (Scott Free Productions; Kinberg Genre; 20th Century Fox)
- Best Dramatic Presentation, Short Form: Jessica Jones: "AKA Smile", written by Scott Reynolds, Melissa Rosenberg, and Jamie King, directed by Michael Rymer (Marvel Television; ABC Studios; Tall Girls Productions; Netflix)
- Best Professional Editor, Short Form: Ellen Datlow
- Best Professional Editor, Long Form: Sheila E. Gilbert
- Best Professional Artist: Abigail Larson
- Best Semiprozine: Uncanny Magazine, edited by Lynne M. Thomas & Michael Damian Thomas, Michi Trota, and Erika Ensign & Steven Schapansky
- Best Fanzine: File 770, edited by Mike Glyer
- Best Fancast: no award
- Best Fan Writer: Mike Glyer
- Best Fan Artist: Steve Stiles

=== Other awards ===
- John W. Campbell Award for Best New Writer: Andy Weir

== Site selection ==
The location was selected on 17 August 2014 by the members of the 72nd World Science Fiction Convention in London.

By the February 2014 deadline, only two committees had announced bids to host the 74th World Science Fiction Convention: "KC in 2016" for 17–21 August 2016, at the Bartle Hall Convention Center in downtown Kansas City, Missouri, and "Beijing in 2016" for 14–19 August 2016, at the China National Convention Center. Kansas City bid co-chairs Diane Lacey, Ruth Lichtwardt, and Jeff Orth represented the non-profit Mid American Science Fiction and Fantasy Conventions, Inc. Of the 758 votes cast by Loncon 3 members, Kansas City won the contest with 651 votes over Beijing with 70 votes. "None of the above" received 4 votes while other sites, including Minneapolis, Boston, Norway, Helsinki, and Sitka, Alaska, received 1 or 2 votes each. If Beijing had been selected, this would have been the first Worldcon in China and the first in mainland Asia.

== See also ==
- Hugo Award
- Science fiction
- Speculative fiction
- World Science Fiction Society
- Worldcon

Preceded by 73rd World Science Fiction Convention; Sasquan in Spokane, Washington, United States (2015)	List of Worldcons; 74th World Science Fiction Convention; MidAmeriCon II in Kansas City, Missouri, United States (2016)	Succeeded by 75th World Science Fiction Convention; Worldcon 75 in Helsinki, Finland (2017)
