= Conestoga (convention) =

US science fiction and fantasy convention

- Status: Inactive
- Genre: Science fiction
- Venue: Radisson Tulsa
- Locations: Tulsa, Oklahoma
- Country: United States
- Inaugurated: 1997
- Most recent: 2010
- Attendance: 500+
- Organizer: Conestoga, Inc.
- Filing status: Non Profit

Conestoga was a literary science fiction and fantasy convention held annually in Tulsa, Oklahoma, from 1997 through 2010, after which it was suspended for financial and logistical reasons. The convention at first was designated by the year in which it was held. With its sixth incarnation, Conestoga converted to a whole number count, rolling the first five into the number tally, and running through #14 before stopping. Celebrating science fiction and fantasy literature and art were staples of the convention, but many who were also interested in horror, anime, and comics attended. Popular activities at the convention included filking (filk singing is a play on folk) and gaming. Featured programming included a writers track, an art show, a dealer room, a masquerade, and a play put on by the Penguin Playhouse Troupe.

== Past conventions ==
=== Conestoga '97 (1) ===
Conestoga '97 was held March 21-23, 1997, at the Radisson Inn at the Tulsa Airport. Featured guests included Guests of Honor Barbara Hambly & George Alec Effinger, Artist Guest of Honor Joy Marie Ledet, Toastmaster Robin Wayne Bailey, Fan Guest of Honor Gerald Burton, and Filk Guest of Honor Tom Smith. The con chair was Curtis Berry. The play was the Star Bores Trilogy. Charity activities during the convention benefited the American Cancer Society.

=== Conestoga '98 (2) ===
Conestoga '98 was held June 26-28, 1998, at the Sheraton Tulsa Hotel, on 41st Street near Highway 169. Featured guests included Guest of Honor Connie Willis, Artist Guest of Honor David A. Cherry, Toastmaster Mark Simmons, Fan Guests of Honor Jim & Susan Satterfield, and Special Guest Carole Nelson Douglas. The con chair was Roger Allen. The play was All Alone, After the Fall of a Very Long Night. Charity activities during the convention benefited the Tulsa Zoo.

=== Conestoga '99 (3) ===
Conestoga '99 was held June 25-27, 1999. Featured guests included Guest of Honor Harry Turtledove, Artist Guest of Honor David Lee Anderson, Toastmaster Gardner Dozois, Mystery Guest of Honor Barbara Hambly, Fan Guest of Honor Keith Stokes, and Special Guest George Alec Effinger. (At the last minute, Effinger was unable to attend.) The con chair was Tim Frayser. The play was The Fandom Menace. Charity activities during the convention benefited Our House.

=== Conestoga 2000 (4) ===
Conestoga 2000 was held July 14-16, 2000. Featured guests included Guest of Honor David Weber, Artist Guest of Honor Lubov, Mystery Guest of Honor Nancy Pickard, Toastmaster Roger Tener, and Fan Guests of Honor Tim & Kimber Chessmore. The con chair was Randy Farran. The play was Spandex Men. Charity activities during the convention benefited Operation School Bell.

=== Conestoga 2001 (5) ===
Conestoga 2001 was held July 27-29, 2001. Featured guests included Guest of Honor Joe Haldeman, Artist Guest of Honor Kelley Vandevir, Toastmaster Tim Powers, and Fan Guests of Honor Mike & Karla Weaver. The con chair was Tim Frayser. The play was Plan 9 of the Apes. Charity activities during the convention benefited the Tulsa Air and Space Center.

=== Conestoga 6 (2002) ===
Conestoga 6 was held July 19-21, 2002. Featured guests included Guest of Honor Elizabeth Moon, Artist Guest of Honor Nene Thomas, Toastmistress Lee Martindale, Fan Guests of Honor Lori Wolf and A.T. Campbell, III, and Special Guest Joe R. Lansdale. The con chair was Danny Myers. The play was Attack of the Groans. Charity activities during the convention benefited Tulsa Domestic Violence Intervention Services, Inc.

=== Conestoga 7 (2003) ===
Conestoga 7 was held July 18-20, 2003. This was the first year of the Conestoga Short Film Festival and the old OKon mascot "Okie the Penguin" returned as the official mascot of Conestoga Featured guests included Guest of Honor David Brin, Artist Guest of Honor Keith Birdsong, Toastmistress Esther Friesner, and Fan Guest of Honor David Lee Anderson. The con chair was Randy Farran. The play was Spandex 2XL. Charity activities during the convention benefited the Tulsa Speech and Hearing Association.

=== Conestoga 8 (2004) ===
Conestoga 8 was held July 16-18, 2004. Featured guests included Guest of Honor Eric Flint, Artist Guest of Honor Darrell K. Sweet, Toastmaster Walter Jon Williams, and Fan Guests of Honor Curtis & Marilyn Berry. The con chair was Tim Frayser. The play was Dorks of the Ring. Charity activities during the convention benefited the Animal Rescue Foundation.

=== Conestoga 9 (2005) ===
Conestoga 9 was held July 15-17, 2005. Featured guests included Guest of Honor George R.R. Martin, Artist Guest of Honor Brad W. Foster, Toastmaster Bradley Denton, and Fan Guests of Honor: Margene Bahm, Paula Helm Murray, & James J. Murray. The con chair was Randy Farran. The play was The Sith Hits the Fans. Charity activities during the convention benefited Big Brothers and Big Sisters of Green Country.

=== Conestoga 10 (2006) ===
Conestoga 10 was held July 28-30, 2006, at the Radisson Tulsa (formerly a Sheraton) in Tulsa, Oklahoma. Conestoga shared its tenth anniversary celebration with small press publishers Meisha Merlin Publishing and Yard Dog Press. Featured guests included Guest of Honor David Drake, Artist Guest of Honor Don Maitz, Toastmaster Robin Wayne Bailey, Fan Guests of Honor Lynn Stranathan & Selina Rosen, plus Special Guest James P. Hogan. The play was A Night at the Space Opera. Charity activities during the convention benefited The Royal Gauntlet Educational Birds of Prey Show and Animal Rehabilitation Center.

=== Conestoga 11 (2007) ===
Conestoga 11 was held July 20-22, 2007, at the Radisson Tulsa in Tulsa, Oklahoma. Conestoga is the host to 1632 Minicon 6. Featured guests included Guest of Honor Laurell K. Hamilton, Artist Guest of Honor John Picacio, Toastmaster Elizabeth Moon, Fan Guests of Honor Richard and Michelle Zellich, and special "1632" Guest of Honor Eric Flint. The con chair was Randy Farran. The play was Heroes of the Lost Battlestar. Charity activities during the convention benefited Safari’s Sanctuary, a non-profit 501(c)(3) wildlife refuge with two missions: rescue & education.

=== Conestoga 12 (2008) ===
Conestoga 12 was held July 25-27, 2008, at the Radisson Tulsa in Tulsa, Oklahoma. Featured guests included Guest of Honor Diana Gabaldon, Toastmaster Gordon Van Gelder, Art Guest of Honor Stephen Hickman, and Fan Guest of Honor Tim Miller. The play was You Don't Mess with the Iron Man. Charity activities during the convention benefited Therapetics, a non-profit organization that provides service dogs to care for the disabled.

=== Conestoga 13 (2009) ===
Conestoga 13 was held April 24-26, 2009, at the Radisson Tulsa in Tulsa, Oklahoma. Featured guests included Guest of Honor Robin Hobb, Toastmaster Frank Wu, Art Guest of Honor Real Musgrave, and Fan Guest of Honor Diana Bailey. The play was Botchmen.

=== Conestoga 14 (2010) ===
Conestoga 14 was held April 23-25, 2010, at the Radisson Tulsa in Tulsa, Oklahoma. Featured guests included Guest of Honor S. M. Stirling, Artist Guest of Honor Bob Eggleton, Fan Guest of Honor Leonard Bishop, and Toastmaster Travis S. Taylor. The play was Derivitar.

== Scheduled but eventually canceled ==
Conestoga 15 was originally scheduled to be held April 29-May 1, 2011, at the Radisson Tulsa in Tulsa, Oklahoma. However, due to financial and logistical concerns, Conestoga 15 was postponed indefinitely.
