= Tuckercon =

Tuckercon/Archon31
- Genre: Science fiction/Fantasy
- Venue: Gateway Center and Collinsville Holiday Inn
- Locations: Collinsville, Illinois
- Country: United States
- Inaugurated: August 2–5, 2007
- Attendance: ~1,700
- Organizer: St. Louis Science Fiction Ltd.
- Website: http://www.archonstl.org/31/index2.html

Tuckercon, also known as Archon31, was the ninth North American Science Fiction Convention, held in Collinsville, Illinois, on August 2–5, 2007, at the Gateway Center and Collinsville Holiday Inn. Collinsville is just across the Mississippi River from St Louis, Missouri. This NASFiC was held because Yokohama, Japan, was selected as the location for the 2007 Worldcon.

Tuckercon was dedicated to the memory of Wilson "Bob" Tucker. The convention is also 31st in the series of St. Louis-area conventions known as Archon.

== Guests of honor ==
- Barry & Sally Childs-Helton, Filk
- Bill Corbett, Media
- Elizabeth Covey, Costuming
- James Ernest of Cheapass Games, Gaming
- Barbara Hambly, Featured
- Richard Hatch, Last-Minute Special
- Nancy "Cleo" Hathaway, Fan
- Vic Milan, Masquerade MC
- Kevin Murphy, Media
- Darrell K. Sweet, Artist
- Roger Tener, Toastmaster
- Lani Tupu, Media/Workshop

Kevin Murphy and Bill Corbett replaced Media guest Mira Furlan who was unable to attend.

== Information ==
=== Site selection ===
After "Nippon in 2007" was selected over the Columbus, Ohio bid as the World Science Fiction Convention to be held in 2007 (as "Nippon 2007" in The Hague), the WSFS Business Meeting directed that a written ballot election be held at Cascadia Con, the then-upcoming 2005 NASFiC in Seattle, Washington, to select a NASFiC site for 2007. The St. Louis bid, originally unopposed, defeated a write-in campaign by a San Jose, California bid with 111 of the 161 votes cast.

=== Committee ===
- Co-Chair: Steve Norris
- Co-Chair: Michelle Zellich
- Art Show: Susan Bolhafner
- Charity & Other Auctions: Mike Hatley
- Children's Programming: Steve Bolhafner
- Dealers Room: Jill Lybarger
- Filking: Gary Hanak
- Gaming: Jon Bancroft
- Hospitality Room: Dennis Kleine
- Logistics: Sean Sendlein
- Masquerade: Sheila Lenkman, Scott Corwin
- Program Book & Progress Reports: John Sies
- Programming: Michelle Zellich
- Registration: Maureen Davis
- Special Events: John Mitchell
- Treasurer: Lucinda Gille-Rowley
- Video Rooms: David Schuey
- Volunteers: Jason Halbert
- Webmaster: Rich Zellich

=== Events ===
The Sidewise Awards for Alternate History were presented to Gardner Dozois for his story "Counterfactual" and to Charles Stross for the first three novels in his The Merchant Princes series.

=== Notable program participants ===
Robin Wayne Bailey, Peter S. Beagle, Peter Bradley, Rachel Caine, Eric Flint, Laurell K. Hamilton, Jacqueline Lichtenberg, Lee Martindale, Jack McDevitt, Elizabeth Moon, Jody Lynn Nye, Hank Reinhardt, Selina Rosen, Steven H Silver, The Great Luke Ski, Tom Smith, Toni Weisskopf, Gene Wolfe

== See also ==
- World Science Fiction Society

Preceded by 8th North American Science Fiction Convention; Cascadia Con in Seattle, United States (2005)	List of NASFiCs; 9th North American Science Fiction Convention; Tuckercon in Collinsville, IL, United States (2007)	Succeeded by 10th North American Science Fiction Convention; ReConStruction in Raleigh, NC, United States (2010)
