= Detcon1 =

- convention logo
- Status: Active
- Genre: Science fiction/Fantasy
- Venue: Detroit Marriott at the Renaissance Center
- Locations: Detroit, Michigan
- Country: United States
- Inaugurated: 2014
- Organizer: Driving the Future, Inc.
- Filing status: 501(c)(7)
- Website: detcon1.org

Detcon1 was the 11th occasional North American Science Fiction Convention (NASFiC). It was held in Detroit, Michigan, from July 17–20, 2014, in the Detroit Marriott at the Renaissance Center. This NASFiC was scheduled because London, England, was selected as the location for the 2014 World Science Fiction Convention.

== Guests of honor ==
- Author: Steven Barnes
- Artist: John Picacio
- Fan: Bernadette Bosky, Arthur D. Hlavaty, and Kevin J. Maroney
- Scientist: Helen Greiner
- Music: Bill and Brenda Sutton
- ConChairs Emeritus: Roger Sims and Fred Prophet, co-chairs of Detention, the 17th World Science Fiction Convention, held in Detroit in 1959

== Information ==
=== Site selection ===
After "London in 2014" was selected as the World Science Fiction Convention to be held in 2014 (as "LonCon 3" in London, England), the WSFS Business Meeting directed that a written ballot election be held at LoneStarCon 3, the then-upcoming Worldcon in San Antonio, Texas, to select a NASFiC site for 2014.

Detroit's bid was certified as the winner with 231 votes over a Phoenix bid that garnered 210 votes. Detroit needed at least 223 votes to win in the first round, based on the total of 453 valid votes cast. Minneapolis, None of the Above, and Gnawbone, Indiana, each received single write-in votes.

=== Committee ===
- Chair: Tammy Coxen
- Treasurer: Don Wenzel
- Operations: David Stein
- Programming: Kim Kofmel

=== Events ===
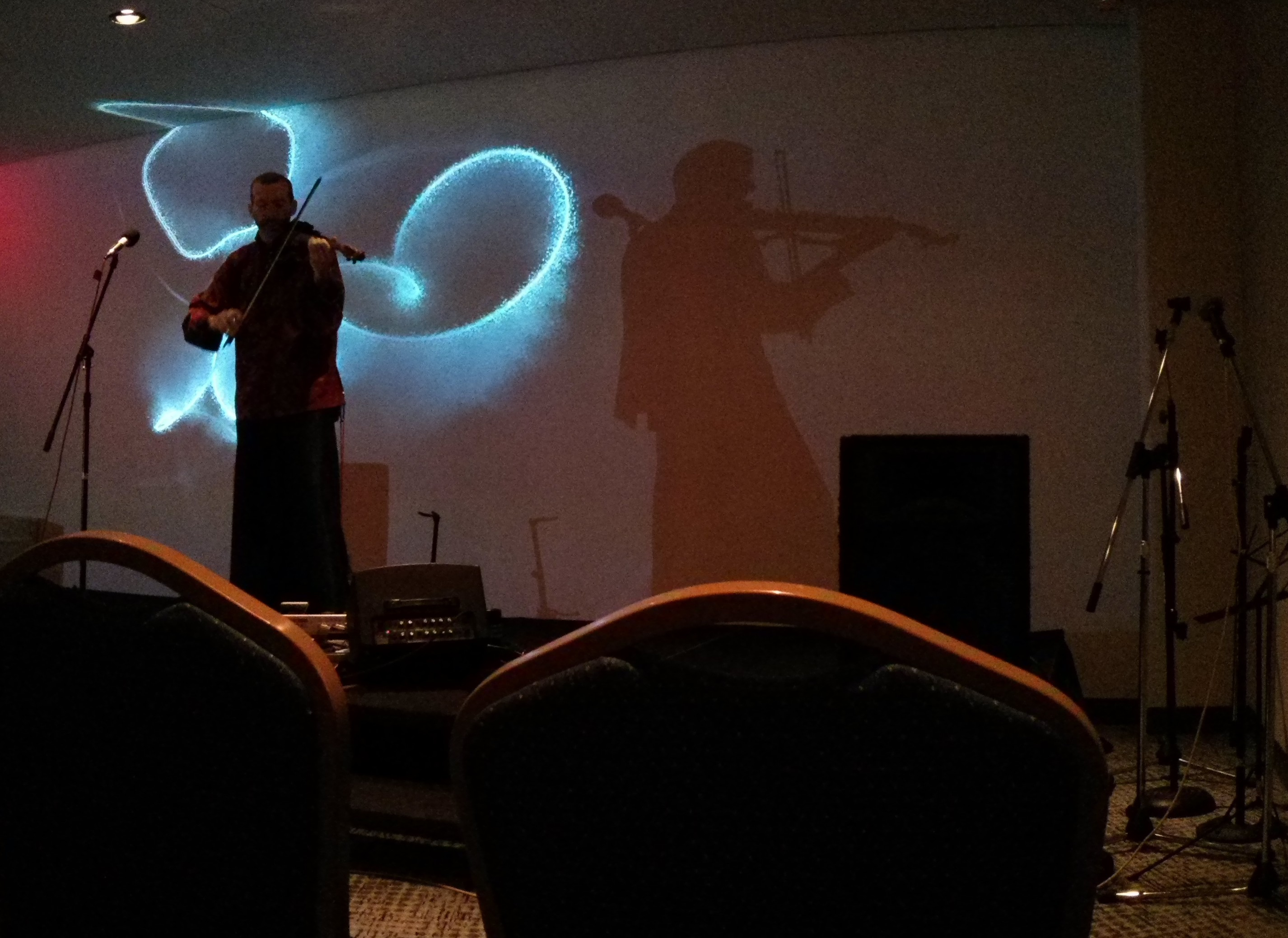
Violin performance at Detcon1, July 2014

The convention shared the weekend in downtown Detroit with Netroots Nation 2014, a political convention for American progressive political activists. Detcon1 offered Netroots Nation attendees a significant discount on weekend memberships.

=== Awards ===
Detcon1 announced in January 2014 that it would host the Golden Duck Awards, juried awards that are presented by Super-Con-Duck-Tivity to recognize excellence in children's and young adult science fiction. Detcon1 also presented its own Detcon1 Awards for Young Adult and Middle Grade Speculative Fiction. Any member of the public could nominate for the awards; members voted to select among the top nominees.

- Detcon1 Award for Middle Grade Speculative Fiction: Handbook for Dragon Slayers by Merrie Haskell
- Detcon1 Choice Award for Young Adult Speculative Fiction: The Dream Thieves by Maggie Stiefvater

== See also ==
- World Science Fiction Society

Preceded by 10th North American Science Fiction Convention; ReConStruction in Raleigh, NC, United States (2010)	List of NASFiCs; 11th North American Science Fiction Convention; Detcon1 in Detroit, MI, United States (2014)	Succeeded by 12th North American Science Fiction Convention; NorthAmeriCon '17 in San Juan, PR, United States (2017)
