= Rule 18 =

1938 work by Clifford D. Simak

- Short story by Clifford D. Simak
- Country: United States
- Language: English
- Genre(s): Science fiction

Publication
- Publisher: Astounding Science Fiction
- Publication date: July 1938

"Rule 18" is a 1938 science fiction novelette by American writer Clifford D. Simak, credited as launching Simak's career and helping inspire the writing style of Isaac Asimov. It won a Retrospective Hugo Award for Best Novelette in 2014.

== Plot summary ==
Because Earthmen in the year 2479 have been made soft by widespread automation and easy living, the coach of Earth's football team uses time travel to build an all-star roster for the annual football match against the normally dominant team from Mars. Rule 18 of this Earth vs Mars contest specifies that players for a team must be natives of the planet for which they play and that his 9 preceding generations must also be natives of that planet.

== Publication history ==
"Rule 18" was originally published in the July 1938 issue of Astounding Science Fiction, and is credited as "the true beginning of his career". The story has been reprinted only once, in a February 1990 British anthology of Simak works titled The Autumn Land and Other Stories from Mandarin Publishing.

== Cultural impact ==
An 18-year-old Isaac Asimov wrote a letter to Astounding criticizing the story as "incoherent". Simak wrote back to Asimov for details on how he thought the story might be improved and, on second reading, Asimov discovered that the story was "not in the least incoherent". Asimov wrote a letter of apology to Simak and began using a similar scene transition method in his own stories, later writing that "among the major influences on my style was Cliff Simak." He named the narrator in "Trends" after Simak.

== Awards and honors ==
In 2014, members of Loncon 3, the 72nd World Science Fiction Convention, awarded "Rule 18" a Retro Hugo Award for Best Novelette. The novelette would have been eligible for a Hugo Award at the 1939 Worldcon, had the awards existed at the time, and this Retrospective Hugo was presented on the 75th anniversary of that convention.
