= ConDiego =

1990 fan convention in San Diego, California

- Genre: Science fiction/Fantasy
- Venue: Omni Hotel San Diego and the San Diego Convention & Performing Arts Center
- Locations: San Diego, California
- Country: United States
- Inaugurated: August 30 – September 3, 1990
- Attendance: 3,000

ConDiego was the fifth North American Science Fiction Convention, held in San Diego, California, on August 30 – September 3, 1990, at the Omni Hotel San Diego and the San Diego Convention & Performing Arts Center. This NASFiC was held because The Hague, Netherlands, was selected as the location for the 1990 Worldcon.

== Guests of honor ==
- Samuel R. Delany, pro
- Ben Yalow, fan

== Information ==
=== Site selection ===
After "Holland in '90" was selected over the Los Angeles bid as the World Science Fiction Convention to be held in 1990 (as "ConFiction" in The Hague), the WSFS Business Meeting directed that a written ballot election be held at CactusCon, the then-upcoming NASFiC in Phoenix, Arizona, to select a NASFiC site for 1990. San Diego, with 155 of the 184 votes cast, became the first NASFiC site to be selected at another NASFiC.

=== Committee ===
- Chair: Albert Lafreniere II

== See also ==
- World Science Fiction Society

Preceded by 4th North American Science Fiction Convention; CactusCon in Phoenix, AZ, United States (1987)	List of NASFiCs; 5th North American Science Fiction Convention; ConDiego in San Diego, CA, United States (1990)	Succeeded by 6th North American Science Fiction Convention; Dragon*Con 1995 in Atlanta, GA, United States (1995)
