= Henry VIII Hotel =

American defunct hotel

Coordinates: 38.759421°N 90.391807°W

The Henry VIII Hotel, also known as The Henry VIII Inn and Lodge, was a hotel of Tudor Revival architecture which was located near the St. Louis Lambert International Airport with an address of 4690 North Lindbergh Boulevard, Bridgeton, Missouri. The hotel remained in business until 2000 when it was removed to expand a runway area for the nearby airport. The Federal Aviation Administration had approved the expansion in 1998 with airport runway planners calling for the demolition of the hotel as far back as 1995.

== Conventions ==
Political election parties and conventions were also held at this location.

=== Archon ===
The Archon multigenre convention hosted by St. Louis Science Fiction, Ltd. was held here for about ten years. The Archon convention was held here 1984 and 1985 and from 1987 until 1992. Many science fiction and fantasy authors and others visited this hotel during these years including the following:

- 1984 L. Sprague de Camp, Catherine Crook de Camp, Jack Gaughan, and C. J. Cherryh
- 1985 R. A. MacAvoy, Rowena Morrill, and Suzette Haden Elgin
- 1987 Glen Cook, James P. Hogan, Keith Berdak, and Nancy Nutt
- 1988 Chelsea Quinn Yarbro, Dennis Etchison, Charles L. Grant, Real Musgrave, and Martha Beck
- 1989 David Brin, Frank Kelly Freas, Julius Schwartz, and Bob Tucker
- 1990 George R. R. Martin, Victor Milán, Ed Bryant, John J. Miller, Melinda Snodgrass, Stephen Leigh, Walter Jon Williams, William F. Wu, Walton Simons, Leanne C. Harper, Gail Miller, and Betsy Mitchell
- 1991 Emma Bull & Will Shetterly, Brian Thomsen & wife Donna Thomsen, Steve & Fran Scherer, and Jim & Kim Elmore
- 1992 John Varley, Don Maitz, Roger Tener, and Ricia Mainhardt

=== Simutronics ===
In 1990, the first Simutronics Corporation's Multiplayer Online Game Players' Convention was held at the King Henry VIII Hotel. The Simutronics Gamer Convention was held here for a few years:

- SimuCon 1990, including Elonka Dunin and David Whatley
- SimuCon 1999
- SimuCon 2000

=== Sports ===
The St. Louis Amateur Boxing Association previously held dinners and boxing shows at the Henry VIII Hotel and Conference Center. Professional boxer William Guthrie won two bouts here in the mid-1990s.
