= Cascadia Con =

2005 North American Science Fiction Convention

- Genre: Science fiction, fantasy
- Venue: Seattle Airport Hilton and Conference Center
- Location: SeaTac, Washington
- Country: United States
- Inaugurated: September 1–5, 2005
- Attendance: 1785/2014
- Organizer: Seattle Westercon Organizing Committee
- Filing status: 501(c)(3)
- Website: http://www.swoc.org/cascadiacon/ (was at cascadiacon.org )

Cascadia Con was the eighth North American Science Fiction Convention, held in SeaTac, Washington, on September 1–5, 2005, at the Seattle Airport Hilton and Conference Center. This NASFiC was held because Glasgow, Scotland, was selected as the location for the 2005 Worldcon.

== Guests of honor ==
- Fred Saberhagen, writer (unable to attend due to illness)
- Liz Danforth, artist
- Kevin Standlee, fan
- Marc Abrahams, science
- Toni Weisskopf, editor
- Uffington Horse, special filk guest
- Hiroaki Inoue, anime
- Harry Harrison, special author guest (unable to attend due to illness)

== Information ==
=== Events ===
- The first American showing of Charlie Jade was presented at Cascadia Con by Jeffrey Pierce and Robert Wertheimer.
- Trailers of Robotech: The Shadow Chronicles were first shown at Cascadia Con, presented by Chase Masterson.
- John and Bjo Trimble, with Marah Searle-Kovacevic, hosted a wake for James Doohan.

=== Heinlein Award ===
The Heinlein Award was presented by the Heinlein Society to Larry Niven and Jerry Pournelle.

=== Site selection ===
After the "UK in 2005" bid was selected, essentially unopposed, as the World Science Fiction Convention to be held in 2005 (as "Interaction" in Glasgow, Scotland, the WSFS Business Meeting directed that a written ballot election be held at TorCon 3, the 2003 Worldcon in Toronto, Ontario, Canada, to select a NASFiC site for 2005. The Seattle bid won by "5 or 6" votes out of the roughly 400 cast.

At Cascadia Con, St. Louis won the vote for the 9th North American Science Fiction Convention in 2007. This is only the second time which a NASFiC site selection vote has been held at a NASFiC.

=== Notable program participants ===
- Marc Abrahams
- Heather Alexander
- C. J. Cherryh
- Julie Czerneda
- William C. Dietz
- Jane Fancher
- Sheila Finch
- Michael F. Flynn
- Robin Hobb
- Chase Masterson
- Larry Niven
- Diana L. Paxson
- John Pelan
- Jerry Pournelle
- Kristine Kathryn Rusch
- Stalking Cat
- Bjo Trimble
- Dan Woren
- Tommy Yune

=== Anthology ===
The anthology Northwest Passages was sponsored by Cascadia Con and released at the convention. It was published by Windstorm Creative and edited by Cris DiMarco. Over 950 authors submitted stories for this anthology, of which 25 were selected for publication.

=== Committee ===
Cascadia Con was held under the auspices of SWOC, the Seattle Westercon Organizing Committee.

- Chair: Bobbie DuFault

==== Division heads ====
- Finance Vice-Chair: Susan Robinson
- Administration Vice-Chair: Pat Porter
- Facilities: Glenn Glazer
- Operations: Marah Searle-Kovacevic, Cheryl Ferguson
- Information Technology Systems: Jerry Gieseke
- Membership Services: Dave Schaber
- Hospitality: Jackie Sherry
- Publications: Allyn Llyr
- Programming: Alex von Thorn
- Special Events: Michael Kemnir
- Video/Film: Bruce E. Durocher II

==== Bid ====
- Bid Chair: Bobbie DuFault
- Bid Vice-Chair: Alex von Thorn

== See also ==
- World Science Fiction Society
- Seattle
- SeaTac

| Preceded by 7th North American Science Fiction Convention; Conucopia in Anaheim, CA, United States (1999) | List of NASFiCs; 8th North American Science Fiction Convention; Cascadia Con in Seattle, United States (2005) | Succeeded by 9th North American Science Fiction Convention; Tuckercon/Archon 31 in Collinsville, IL, United States (2007) |
