= The Water That Falls on You from Nowhere =

2013 short story by John Chu

"The Water That Falls on You from Nowhere" is a 2013 science fiction/magic realism short story by American writer John Chu. It was first published on Tor.com, after being purchased by editor Ann VanderMeer, and subsequently republished in Wilde Stories 2014. As well, Chu has read the story aloud for the StarShipSofa podcast.

== Plot summary ==
Some weeks prior to the beginning of the story, an unexplained phenomenon begins worldwide: whenever a person lies, water falls on that person from nowhere. Phrasing a potential lie as a question does not cause water to fall, while stating an untruth that one believes to be true does. Conversely, profound or universal truths can actually remove moisture from the air.

In the midst of this phenomenon, Matt decides to come out to his traditional Chinese family after his partner, Gus, refuses to marry him until he does.

== Reception ==
"The Water That Falls on You from Nowhere" won the 2014 Hugo Award for Best Short Story. The Guardian called it "deeply personal", while Lambda Literary said it was a "standout". Kirkus Reviews described it as "so beautiful it hurts;" however, the Los Angeles Review of Books described it as "(u)ndoubtedly sweet but also rather sappy."
