= Red River Revel =

Annual festival in Shreveport, Louisiana

- Frequency: Annually
- Location: Shreveport, Louisiana
- Years active: 1976–2019, 2021–
- Founder: Junior League of Shreveport
- Website: www.redriverrevel.com

The Red River Revel (colloquially referred as The Revel by locals) is an annual festival in Shreveport, Louisiana, that occurs every October. The Revel began in 1976 as a bicentennial celebration sponsored by the Junior League of Shreveport. It is a nonprofit festival; any money garnered from sales finances the Revel for next year.

== History ==
No Revel was held in 2020, but it returned the next year.

== Activities ==
Mosaics are produced at the festival. An artist creates a design of the Revel logo, and attendees put colored tiles to match the design. While some mosaics have been removed or blocked due to subsequent construction, others remain visible, including on the base of the Texas Street Bridge. The Revel hosts booths that feature paintings, jewelry and crafts, as well as a children's area that provides visual arts education. The festival also features live music including musicians Benjy Davis Project and Corey Smith.
