= LoneStarCon 1 =

- Genre: Science fiction/Fantasy
- Location: Austin, Texas
- Country: United States
- Inaugurated: August 30-September 2, 1985
- Attendance: 2,800
- Organizer: Fandom Association of Central Texas
- Filing status: 501(c)(3)

LoneStarCon 1 was the third North American Science Fiction Convention, held in Austin, Texas, on August 30-September 2, 1985, at the Hyatt Regency Austin, Sheraton Crest, and Palmer Auditorium. LoneStarCon 1 was also known as "The First Occasional Lone Star Science Fiction Convention & Chili Cook-off" and "ChiliCon". This NASFiC was held because Melbourne, Australia, was selected as the location for the 1985 Worldcon.

== Guests of honor ==
- Jack Vance, Writer
- Richard Powers, Artist
- Joanne Burger, Fan
- Chad Oliver, Toastmaster

== Information ==
=== Site selection ===
After Aussiecon Two in Melbourne, Australia, was selected as the World Science Fiction Convention to be held in 1985, the WSFS Business Meeting directed that a written ballot election be held to select a NASFiC site for that year. In a three-way race, Austin (393 votes) easily bested Detroit, Michigan (132 votes) and Columbus, Ohio (69 votes) as well as a single write-in vote for Highmore, South Dakota.

=== Committee ===
- Chair: Willie Siros
- Vice-Chair: Robert Taylor

== See also ==
- World Science Fiction Society

Preceded by 2nd North American Science Fiction Convention; NorthAmeriCon '79 in Louisville, KY, United States (1979)	List of NASFiCs; 3rd North American Science Fiction Convention; LoneStarCon 1 in Austin, TX, United States (1985)	Succeeded by 4th North American Science Fiction Convention; CactusCon in Phoenix, AZ, United States (1987)
