= CactusCon =

1987 science fiction convention in Phoenix, AZ

- Genre: Science fiction/Fantasy
- Venue: Hyatt Regency Phoenix, Adams Hilton, and Phoenix Convention Center
- Location: Phoenix, Arizona
- Country: United States
- Inaugurated: September 3–7, 1987
- Attendance: 3,000

CactusCon was the fourth North American Science Fiction Convention, held in Phoenix, Arizona, on September 3–7, 1987, at the Hyatt Regency Phoenix, Adams Hilton, and Phoenix Convention Center. This NASFiC was held because Brighton, England, was selected as the location for the 1987 Worldcon.

== Guests of honor ==
- Hal Clement, pro
- Marjii Ellers, fan
- Julius Schwartz, Toastmaster

== Information ==
=== Site selection ===
After "Britain in '87" was selected over the Phoenix bid as the World Science Fiction Convention to be held in 1987 (as "Conspiracy '87" in Brighton, England), the WSFS Business Meeting directed that a written ballot election be held that afternoon to select a NASFiC site for that year. Essentially unopposed, Phoenix was announced as the winner the next day.

=== Committee ===
- Chair: Bruce Farr

== See also ==
- World Science Fiction Society

Preceded by 3rd North American Science Fiction Convention; LoneStarCon 1 in Austin, TX, United States (1985)	List of NASFiCs; 4th North American Science Fiction Convention; CactusCon in Phoenix, AZ, United States (1987)	Succeeded by 5th North American Science Fiction Convention; ConDiego in San Diego, CA, United States (1990)
