= 75th World Science Fiction Convention =

75th Worldcon (2017)

Worldcon 75, the 75th World Science Fiction Convention
- Genre: Science fiction
- Dates: 9–13 August 2017
- Venue: Helsinki Exhibition and Convention Centre
- Location: Helsinki
- Country: Finland
- Attendance: 7,949
- Website: http://www.worldcon.fi

The 75th World Science Fiction Convention (Worldcon), also known as Worldcon 75, was held on 9–13 August 2017 at the Helsinki Exhibition and Convention Centre in Helsinki, Finland.

The convention chair was Jukka Halme, and the vice-chairs were Karo Leikomaa and Colette H. Fozard.

== Participants ==
Attendance was 7,949, out of 10,616 paid memberships and day passes.

=== Guests of honor ===
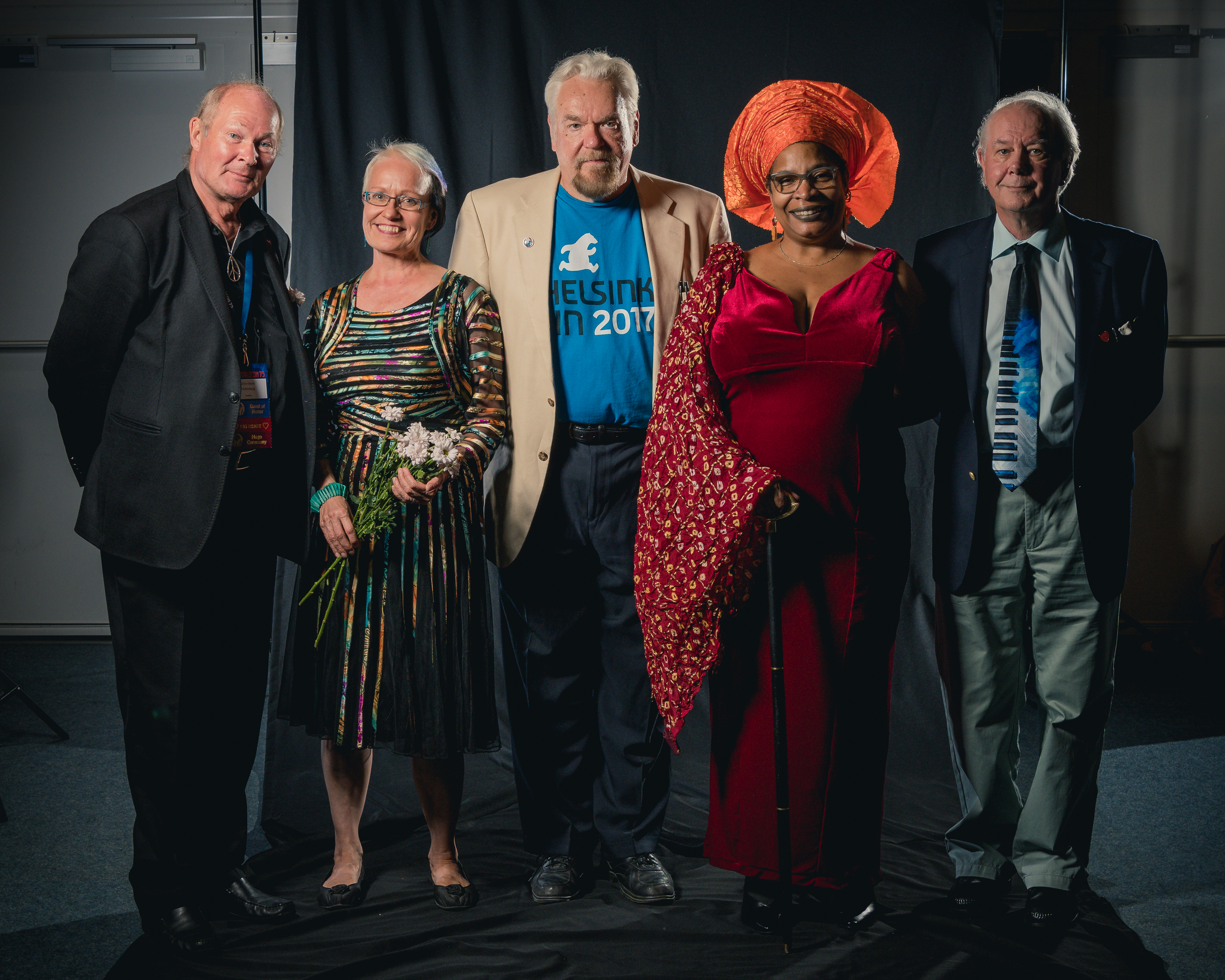
Guests of Honour John-Henri Holmberg, Johanna Sinisalo, Walter Jon Williams, Nalo Hopkinson and science guest Ian Stewart.

- Swedish author and translator John-Henri Holmberg
- Jamaican author Nalo Hopkinson
- Finnish author Johanna Sinisalo
- French artist and illustrator Claire Wendling (absent due to illness)
- American author Walter Jon Williams

== Awards ==
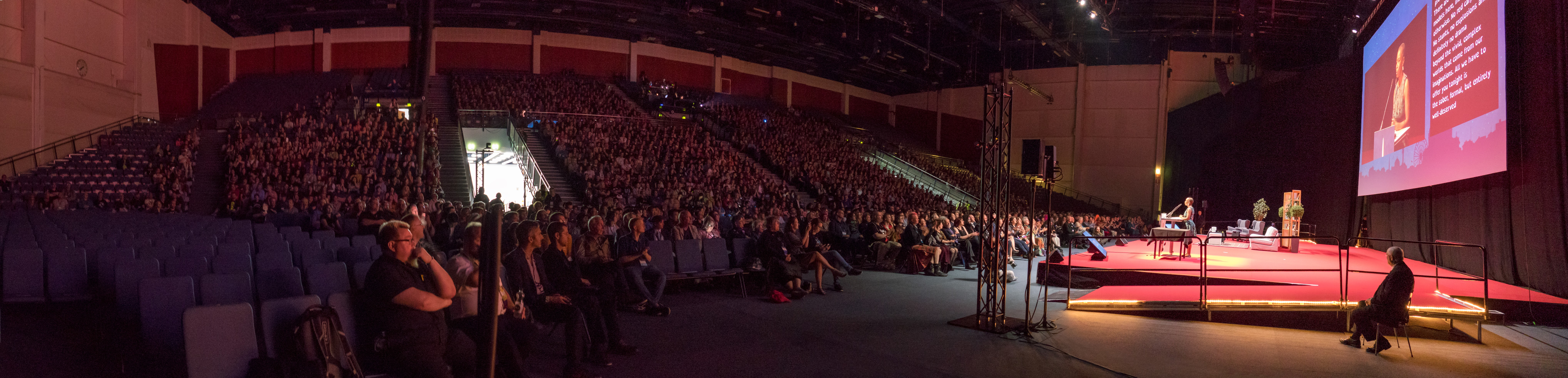
Audience at the awards ceremony.

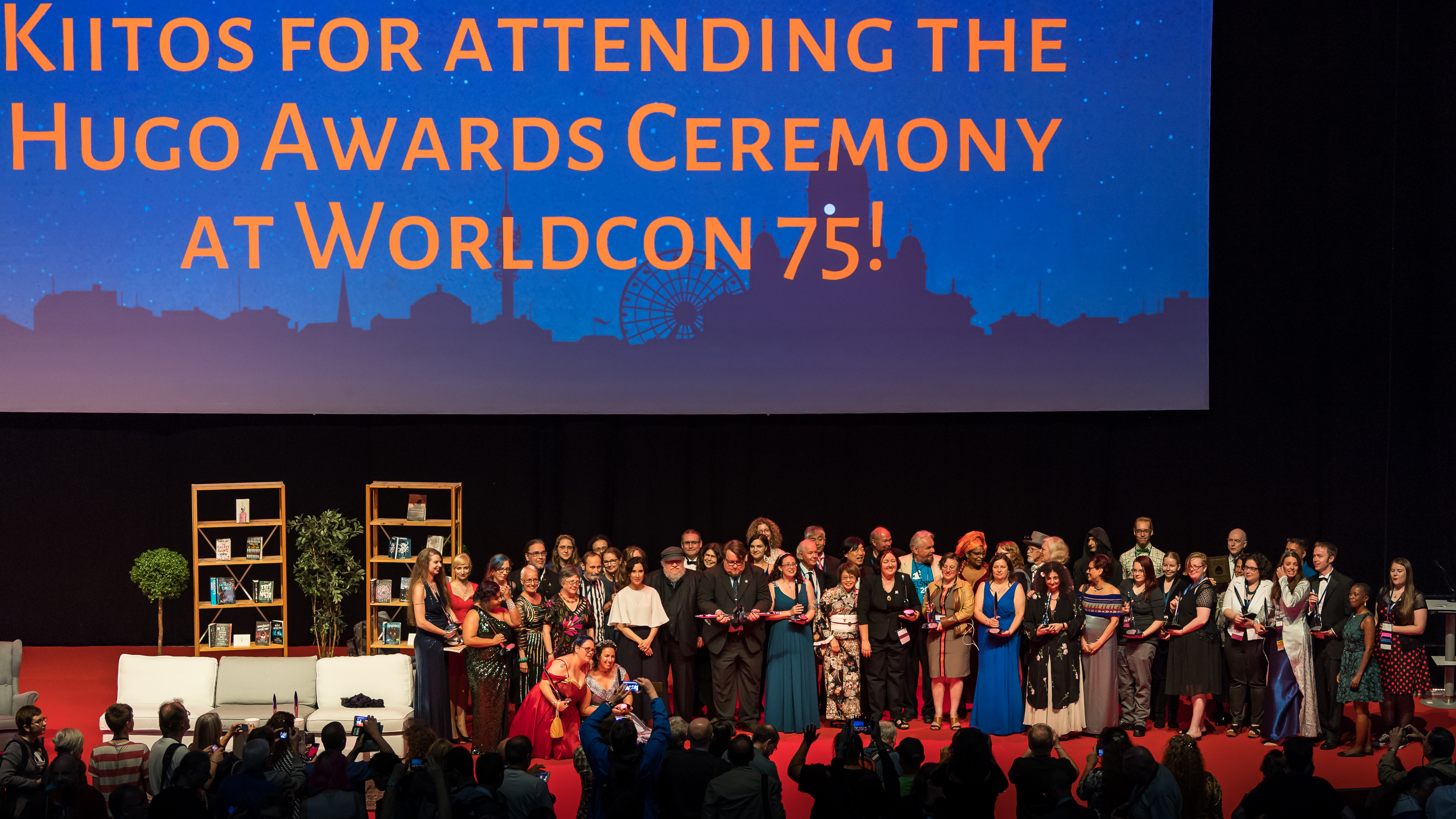
Winners, presenters and other participants in the awards ceremony.

The World Science Fiction Society administers and presents the Hugo Awards, the oldest and most noteworthy award for science fiction. Selection of the recipients is by vote of the Worldcon members. Categories include novels and short fiction, artwork, dramatic presentations, and various professional and fandom activities.

Other awards may be presented at Worldcon at the discretion of the individual convention committee. This has often included the national SF awards of the host country, such as the Japanese Seiun Awards as part of Nippon 2007, and the Prix Aurora Awards as part of Anticipation in 2009. The Astounding Award for Best New Writer and the Sidewise Award, though not sponsored by the Worldcon, are usually presented, as well as the Chesley Awards, the Prometheus Award, and others. In 2021, the Nommo Awards began presenting at Worldcon.

=== 2017 Hugo Awards ===
- Best Novel: The Obelisk Gate by N. K. Jemisin
- Best Novella: "Every Heart a Doorway" by Seanan McGuire
- Best Novelette: "The Tomato Thief" by Ursula Vernon
- Best Short Story: "Seasons of Glass and Iron" by Amal El-Mohtar
- Best Related Work: Words Are My Matter: Writings About Life and Books by Ursula K. Le Guin
- Best Graphic Story: Monstress, Volume 1, written by Marjorie Liu, art by Sana Takeda, colors by ?
- Best Dramatic Presentation, Long Form: Arrival, screenplay by Eric Heisserer; story by Ted Chiang; directed by Denis Villeneuve
- Best Dramatic Presentation, Short Form: The Expanse, "Leviathan Wakes", screenplay by Mark Fergus & Hawk Ostby, directed by Terry McDonough
- Best Professional Editor, Long Form: Liz Gorinsky
- Best Professional Editor, Short Form: Ellen Datlow
- Best Professional Artist: Julie Dillon
- Best Semiprozine: Uncanny Magazine, edited by Lynne M. Thomas and Michael Damian Thomas
- Best Fancast: Tea and Jeopardy, edited by Emma Newman and Peter Newman
- Best Fanzine: Lady Business, edited by ?
- Best Fan Writer: Abigail Nussbaum
- Best Fan Artist: Elizabeth Leggett

=== Other awards ===
- John W. Campbell Award for Best New Writer: Ada Palmer
- Atorox Award: Maiju Ihalainen
- Seiun Award: Yasumi Kobayashi (novel)
- Big Heart Award: Carolina Gómez Lagerlöf

== Site selection ==
The location was selected in August 2015 by the members of the 73rd World Science Fiction Convention (Sasquan) in Spokane, Washington.

The following committees announced bids to host the 75th World Science Fiction Convention and filed all of the required paperwork before the February 2015 filing deadline:

- DC-17, to be held at the Marriott Wardman Park in Washington, D.C., on 16–20 August 2017. The bid co-chairs were Michael Nelson and Warren Buff.
- Helsinki in 2017, to be held at the Helsinki Exhibition and Convention Centre in Helsinki, Finland, on 9–13 August 2017. The bid chair was Eemeli Aro.
- Montréal in 2017, to be held at the Palais des congrès de Montréal in Montréal, Québec, Canada, on 31 August–4 September 2017. The bid chair was Jannie Shea.
- Nippon in 2017, to be held at the Shizuoka Convention & Arts Center in Shizuoka, Japan, on 23–27 August 2017. The bid chair was Hideaki Kawai.

A bid for New York City in 2017 was floated for several years but dropped before reaching the commitment stage. The Montréal bid was originally announced for 2019 but shifted to the earlier date in 2013.

The 2017 site selected by the voters was announced during Sasquan's third World Science Fiction Society business meeting, on Saturday, 22 August 2015. With 1363 votes out of 2625 valid ballots, Helsinki won on the first ballot and will operate as "Worldcon 75". DC17 ran second with 878 votes. Montréal third with 228, and Nippon fourth with 120. Sites receiving write-in votes included Night Vale, Minneapolis in '73. Gallifrey, and All of the Above.

== See also ==
- Hugo Award
- Science fiction
- Speculative fiction
- World Science Fiction Society
- Worldcon

Preceded by 74th World Science Fiction Convention; MidAmericon II in Kansas City, Missouri, United States (2016)	List of Worldcons; 75th World Science Fiction Convention; Worldcon 75 in Helsinki, Finland (2017)	Succeeded by 76th World Science Fiction Convention; Worldcon 76 in San Jose, California, United States (2018)
