= John Chu =

American writer

- Chu at Worldcon 2026
- Occupations: Author, engineer, translator
- Writing career
- Notable works: The Water That Falls on You from Nowhere (2013); If You Find Yourself Speaking to God, Address God with the Informal You (2022)
- Notable awards: Hugo Award for Best Short Story (2014); Nebula Award for Best Novelette (2022); Locus Award for Best Novelette (2023); Ignyte Award for Best Novelette (2023)
- Website: johnchu.net

John Chu (Chinese: 朱中宜) is a Taiwanese-American science fiction writer and computer scientist. His work has won a Nebula award, a Hugo award, an Ignyte award, and a Locus award.

== Personal life and education ==
Chu was born in Taiwan. He moved to the US and began learning English at age six. He read voraciously as a child and credits reading Year’s Best SF volumes as solidifying his love of short science fiction stories. The works of Ted Chiang made Chu realize it was possible to be a working author.

Chu attended the 2006 Viable Paradise workshop. And in 2010 was a graduate of the Clarion science fiction & fantasy workshop.

He has a PhD in computer engineering and works as a microprocessor architect by day. He is gay, a theme that he explores in his writing. Other common themes in Chu's work include family relationships, the limitations of the body, accepting yourself, and the power of food in human connections. Chu is a fan of the theatre.

== Career ==
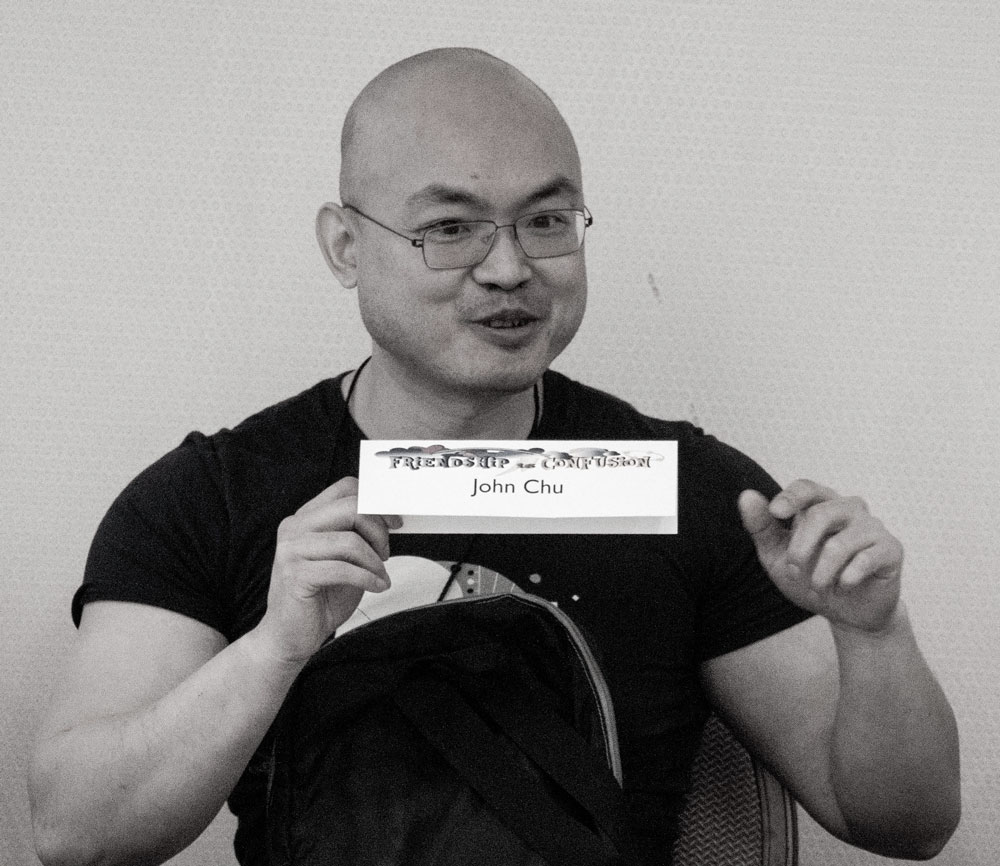
Chu at ConFusion in 2017

Chu published his first story in 2011. As of 2024, he has published over two dozen stories.

In 2014, Chu’s third published story, "The Water That Falls on You from Nowhere," at Tor.com went on to win the 2014 Hugo Award for Best Short Story.

Chu’s story "If You Find Yourself Speaking to God, Address God with the Informal You" won the 2022 Nebula award, the 2023 Ignyte award, and the 2023 Locus award for Best Novelette. The story was runner up for the 2023 Hugo award.

Chu’s stories have appeared on the Locus Recommended reading list four times.

In addition to his work as an author, Chu also reads for podcasts and translates novels and stories from Chinese into English. His interest in translation began after he acted as a beta reader for Ken Liu’s English translation of The Three Body Problem. Chu was offered his first translation job in 2013.

Chu’s debut novel, The Subtle Art of Folding Space, was released April 7, 2026.

== Bibliography ==
=== Novels ===
The Subtle Art of Folding Space. (7 April 2026). Tor. ISBN 978-1250382085.

=== Short fiction ===
Title	Year	First published	Reprinted/collected	Awards/Honors
"Wonderland Is a Parking Lot in Revere"	2024	Uncanny Magazine, July/August 2024		
"Halfway Between Albany and West Point"	2023	The Sunday Morning Transport, October 1st, 2023		
"Equal Forces Opposed in Exquisite Tension"	2023	New Suns 2, Solaris, March 14th, 2023		
"If You Find Yourself Speaking to God, Address God with the Informal You"	2022	Uncanny Magazine, July/August 2022		Winner 2022 Nebula Award For Best Novelette Winner 2023 Ignyte Award For Best Novelette Winner 2023 Locus Award For Best Novelette Finalist 2023 Hugo Award for Best Novelette 2022 Locus Recommended Reading Novelette
"Dancing with Death"	2020	Made to Order: Robots and Revolution, Solaris March 17th, 2020		
"Close Enough for Jazz"	2019	The Mythic Dream, Saga Press September 3, 2019		
"Probabilitea"	2019	Uncanny Magazine, May/June 2019		
"Beyond the El"	2019	Tor.com, January 16, 2019		2019 Locus Recommended Reading: Short Stories
"Quantifying Trust"	2018	Mothers of Invention, Twelve Planet Press, September 2018	Reprinted in The Best Science Fiction of the Year Volume 4, edited by Neil Clarke, published by Night Shade Books.	
"Making the Magic Lightning Strike Me"	2017	Uncanny Magazine, May, 2017	Reprinted in Wilde Stores 2018: The Year's Best Gay Speculative Fiction, edited by Steve Berman, published by Lethe Press	
"The Sentry Branch Predictor Spec: A Fairy Tale"	2016	Clarkesworld, July 2016		
"How to Piss Off a Failed Super-Soldier"	2016	The Book Smugglers' Quarterly Almanac, Volume 1, June, 2016		
"Selected Afterimages of the Fading"	2016	Defying Doomsday, Twelve Planet Press, June 2016		
"The Law and the Profits"	2016	The Revelator, March, 2016		
"Finding Your Slot"	2015	Moozvine, November, 2015		
"Hold-Time Violations"	2015	Tor.com, October 7, 2015	Reprinted in The Best Science Fiction of the Year Volume 1, edited by Neil Clarke, published by Night Shade Books	2015 Locus Recommended Reading: Short Stories
"勢孤取和 (Influence Isolated, Make Peace)"	2015	Lightspeed, June, 2015		
"Restore the Heart into Love"	2015	Uncanny Magazine, May, 2015		
"Repairing the World"	2014	Apex Magazine, April, 2014		
"A Cost-Benefit Analysis of the Proposed Trade-Offs for the Overhaul of the Barricade"	2014	Tor.com, July 30, 2014		
"Double Time"	2014	Kaleidoscope, Twelfth Planet Press		
"Best of All Possible Worlds"	2013	Asimov's Science Fiction, February 2013		
"The Water That Falls on You from Nowhere"	2013	Tor.com, February 20, 2013)	Berman, Steve, ed. (2014). Wilde Stories 2014: The Year's Best Gay Speculative Fiction. Lethe Press.	Winner 2014 Hugo Award for Best Short Story 2013 Locus Recommended Reading: Short Stories
"Incomplete Proofs"	2012	Bloody Fabulous, Prime Books		
"Thirty Seconds from Now"	2011	Boston Review, September/October		

=== Critical reactions ===
Jo Walton reviewed Chu's first novel, The Subtle Art of Folding Space: "This is a story about a family, and rewriting the underlying physics of the universe." Full review: Jo Walton's Reading List: April & May 2025

Library Journal listed this novel as their SFF Debut of the Month, writing that "Chu finds a delightful and poignant intersection between the multiverse, family dysfunction, and dim sum in his debut novel." Review and rating, Dec 10, 2025
