= ReConStruction =

- convention logo
- Genre: Science fiction/Fantasy
- Venue: Raleigh Convention Center
- Locations: Raleigh, North Carolina
- Country: United States
- Inaugurated: 2010
- Attendance: ~1200
- Organizer: Southern Alliance of Fandom Enthusiasts, Inc.
- Filing status: 501(c)(3)

ReConStruction was the tenth occasional North American Science Fiction Convention. It was held in Raleigh, North Carolina, on August 5–8, 2010, at the Raleigh Convention Center, Marriott City Center, and the Downtown Raleigh Sheraton. This NASFiC was held because Melbourne, Australia, was selected as the location for the 2010 Worldcon.

== Guests of honor ==
- Guest of honor: Eric Flint
- Artist guest of honor: Brad W. Foster
- Fan guest of honor: Juanita Coulson
- Toastmaster: Toni Weisskopf

== Information ==
=== Site selection ===
After "Australia in 2010" was selected as the World Science Fiction Convention to be held in 2010 (as "Aussiecon 4" in Melbourne), the WSFS Business Meeting directed that a written ballot election be held at Anticipation, the then-upcoming Worldcon in Montreal, Quebec, Canada, to select a NASFiC site for 2010. Raleigh's bid was certified as the winner with 241 votes out of 276 cast and 3 invalid submissions. Although formally unopposed, the Raleigh bid was not the only location to receive the attention of the voters. Pasadena, California, received 19 votes, Durham, North Carolina, and Ridgecrest, California, each received 1 vote, and joke votes were cast for "Peggy Rae's House" and the fictional planet "Xerps".

=== Committee ===
- Chair: Warren Buff
- Treasurer: Sydnie Krause
- Secretary: Christopher Hensley
- Events: Mike Willmoth
- Facilities: Dina Krause
- Member Services: Russ Miller
- Operations: Chris Ross
- Programming: Mike Willmoth
- Publications: Tim Miller
- Publicity: Stacey Helton McConnell

=== Events ===
Awards presented at this convention included the Golden Duck Awards for children's literature, the Chesley Awards for artistic achievement, and the Sidewise Awards for alternate history fiction.

== See also ==
- World Science Fiction Society

Preceded by 9th North American Science Fiction Convention; Tuckercon/Archon 31 in Collinsville, IL, United States (2007)	List of NASFiCs; 10th North American Science Fiction Convention; ReConStruction in Raleigh, NC, United States (2010)	Succeeded by 11th North American Science Fiction Convention; Detcon1 in Detroit, MI, United States (2014)
