= 57th World Science Fiction Convention =

57th Worldcon (1999)

Aussiecon Three, the 57th World Science Fiction Convention
- Genre: Science fiction
- Dates: 2–6 September 1999
- Venue: Melbourne Convention and Exhibition Centre
- Location: Melbourne
- Country: Australia
- Filing status: Non-profit
- Website: aussiecon3.worldcon.org

The 57th World Science Fiction Convention (Worldcon), also known as Aussiecon Three, was held on 2–6 September 1999 at the Melbourne Convention and Exhibition Centre in Melbourne, Australia.

The convention was chaired by Perry Middlemiss.

== Participants ==
=== Guests of Honour ===
- Gregory Benford, author
- George Turner, author
- Bruce Gillespie, fan

=== Special guest ===
- J. Michael Straczynski, media

=== Noteworthy program participants ===
Russell Blackford
Damien Broderick
Andrew M. Butler
Jack Dann
Keith R. A. DeCandido
Stephen Dedman
Candas Jane Dorsey
Kate Forsyth
Joe Haldeman

David G. Hartwell
Ian Irvine
Sylvia Kelso
Edward E. Kramer
Sean McMullen
Elizabeth Moon
Jonathan Strahan
Gordon Van Gelder
Janeen Webb

== Awards ==
The World Science Fiction Society administers and presents the Hugo Awards, the oldest and most noteworthy award for science fiction. Selection of the recipients is by vote of the Worldcon members. Categories include novels and short fiction, artwork, dramatic presentations, and various professional and fandom activities.

Other awards may be presented at Worldcon at the discretion of the individual convention committee. This has often included the national SF awards of the host country, such as the Japanese Seiun Awards as part of Nippon 2007, and the Prix Aurora Awards as part of Anticipation in 2009. The Astounding Award for Best New Writer and the Sidewise Award, though not sponsored by the Worldcon, are usually presented, as well as the Chesley Awards, the Prometheus Award, and others. In 2021, the Nommo Awards began presenting at Worldcon.

=== 1999 Hugo Awards ===
The Hugo Award ceremony was directed and hosted by Michael Jordan and Executive assistant Paula McGrath.

- Best Novel: To Say Nothing of the Dog by Connie Willis
- Best Novella: "Oceanic" by Greg Egan (Asimov's, August 1998)
- Best Novelette: "Taklamakan" by Bruce Sterling (Asimov's, October/November 1998)
- Best Short Story: "The Very Pulse of the Machine" by Michael Swanwick (Asimov's February 1998)
- Best Related Book: The Dreams Our Stuff is Made Of by Thomas M. Disch
- Best Dramatic Presentation: The Truman Show
- Best Professional Editor: Gardner Dozois
- Best Professional Artist: Bob Eggleton
- Best Semiprozine: Locus, edited by Charles N. Brown
- Best Fanzine: Ansible, edited by Dave Langford
- Best Fan Writer: Dave Langford
- Best Fan Artist: Ian Gunn

=== Other awards ===
- John W. Campbell Award for Best New Writer: Nalo Hopkinson

== Future site selection ==
San Jose, California won the vote for the 62nd World Science Fiction Convention in 2005 by a large majority. A hoax bid for Roswell, New Mexico was the only other bid filed.

=== Committee ===
==== Chair ====
- Perry Middlemiss

==== Division heads ====
- Finance: Rose Mitchell
- Administration: Julian Warner
- Publicity: Alan Stewart
- Major Events: Perry Middlemiss
- Publications: Mark Loney
- Program Operations: Janice Gelb
- Programming: Donna Heenan
- Fixed Functions: Nick Price, Jason Sharples
- Facilities: Stephen Boucher
- WSFS: Stephen Boucher
- InterDivisional Liaison: Michael AJ Jordan

==== Directors ====
- Stephen Boucher
- Christine Dziadosz
- Donna Heenan
- Michael Jordan
- Mark Linneman
- Perry Middlemiss
- Alan Stewart

==== Bid ====
- Bid chair: Alan Stewart

== See also ==
- Aussiecon One (1975)
- Aussiecon Two (1985)
- Hugo Award
- Science fiction
- Speculative fiction
- World Science Fiction Society
- Worldcon

| Preceded by 56th World Science Fiction Convention; Bucconeer in Baltimore, Maryland, United States (1998) | List of Worldcons; 57th World Science Fiction Convention; Aussiecon Three in Melbourne, Australia (1999) | Succeeded by 58th World Science Fiction Convention; Chicon 2000 in Chicago, Illinois, United States (2000) |
