= 33rd World Science Fiction Convention =

33rd Worldcon (1975)

Aussiecon, the 33rd World Science Fiction Convention
- Genre: Science fiction
- Dates: 14–17 August 1975
- Venue: Southern Cross Hotel
- Location: Melbourne
- Country: Australia
- Attendance: 606
- Filing status: non-profit

The 33rd World Science Fiction Convention (Worldcon), also known as Aussiecon, or Aussiecon One, was held on 14–17 August 1975 at the Southern Cross Hotel in Melbourne, Australia.

The chairman was Robin Johnson.

Aussiecon was significant in the development of cohesive Australian activity around science fiction and fantasy fandom.

== Participants ==
Attendance was 606.

=== Guests of Honour ===
- Ursula K. Le Guin (pro)
- Susan Wood (fan)
- Mike Glicksohn (fan)
- Donald Tuck (Australian)
- John Bangsund (toastmaster)

== Awards ==
The World Science Fiction Society administers and presents the Hugo Awards, the oldest and most noteworthy award for science fiction. Selection of the recipients is by vote of the Worldcon members. Categories include novels and short fiction, artwork, dramatic presentations, and various professional and fandom activities.

Other awards may be presented at Worldcon at the discretion of the individual convention committee. This has often included the national SF awards of the host country, such as the Japanese Seiun Awards as part of Nippon 2007, and the Prix Aurora Awards as part of Anticipation in 2009. The Astounding Award for Best New Writer and the Sidewise Award, though not sponsored by the Worldcon, are usually presented, as well as the Chesley Awards, the Prometheus Award, and others. In 2021, the Nommo Awards began presenting at Worldcon.

=== 1975 Hugo Awards ===
- Best Novel: The Dispossessed by Ursula K. Le Guin
- Best Novella: "A Song for Lya" by George R. R. Martin
- Best Novelette: "Adrift Just Off the Islets of Langerhans: Latitude 38° 54′ N, Longitude 77° 00′ 13″ W" by Harlan Ellison
- Best Short Story: "The Hole Man" by Larry Niven
- Best Dramatic Presentation: Young Frankenstein
- Best Professional Editor: Ben Bova
- Best Professional Artist: Frank Kelly Freas
- Best Amateur Magazine: The Alien Critic, edited by Richard E. Geis
- Best Fan Writer: Richard E. Geis
- Best Fan Artist: Bill Rotsler

=== Other awards ===
- Special Award: Donald A. Wollheim as "the fan who has done everything"
- Special Award: Walt Lee for Reference Guide to Fantastic Films
- John W. Campbell Award for Best New Writer: P. J. Plauger
- Gandalf Grand Master Award: Fritz Leiber

== See also ==
- Aussiecon Two (1985)
- Aussiecon Three (1999)
- Aussiecon Four (2010)
- Hugo Award
- Science fiction
- Speculative fiction
- World Science Fiction Society
- Worldcon

Preceded by 32nd World Science Fiction Convention; Discon II in Washington, D.C., United States (1974)	List of Worldcons; 33rd World Science Fiction Convention; Aussiecon in Melbourne, Australia (1975)	Succeeded by 34th World Science Fiction Convention; MidAmeriCon Kansas City, Missouri, United States (1976)
