= 43rd World Science Fiction Convention =

43rd Worldcon (1985)

Aussiecon Two, the 43rd World Science Fiction Convention
- Genre: Science fiction
- Dates: 22–26 August 1985
- Venue: Southern Cross, Victoria, and Sheraton Hotels
- Location: Melbourne
- Country: Australia
- Attendance: 1,599
- Filing status: non-profit

The 43rd World Science Fiction Convention (Worldcon), also known as Aussiecon Two, was held on 22–26 August 1985 at the Southern Cross, Victoria, and Sheraton Hotels in Melbourne, Australia.

The convention was chaired by David Grigg.

== Participants ==
Attendance was 1,599.

=== Guests of Honour ===
- Gene Wolfe (pro)
- Ted White (fan)

== Awards ==
The World Science Fiction Society administers and presents the Hugo Awards, the oldest and most noteworthy award for science fiction. Selection of the recipients is by vote of the Worldcon members. Categories include novels and short fiction, artwork, dramatic presentations, and various professional and fandom activities.

Other awards may be presented at Worldcon at the discretion of the individual convention committee. This has often included the national SF awards of the host country, such as the Japanese Seiun Awards as part of Nippon 2007, and the Prix Aurora Awards as part of Anticipation in 2009. The Astounding Award for Best New Writer and the Sidewise Award, though not sponsored by the Worldcon, are usually presented, as well as the Chesley Awards, the Prometheus Award, and others. In 2021, the Nommo Awards began presenting at Worldcon.

=== 1985 Hugo Awards ===
- Best Novel: Neuromancer by William Gibson
- Best Novella: PRESS ENTER■ by John Varley
- Best Novelette: "Bloodchild" by Octavia Butler
- Best Short Story: "The Crystal Spheres" by David Brin
- Best Non-Fiction Book: Wonder's Child: My Life in Science Fiction by Jack Williamson
- Best Dramatic Presentation: 2010
- Best Professional Editor: Terry Carr
- Best Professional Artist: Michael Whelan
- Best Semiprozine: Locus, edited by Charles N. Brown
- Best Fanzine: File 770, edited by Mike Glyer
- Best Fan Writer: Dave Langford
- Best Fan Artist: Alexis Gilliland

=== Other awards ===
- John W. Campbell Award for Best New Writer: Lucius Shepard

== See also ==
- Aussiecon One (1975)
- Aussiecon Three (1999)
- Hugo Award
- Science fiction
- Speculative fiction
- World Science Fiction Society
- Worldcon

Preceded by 42nd World Science Fiction Convention; L.A.con II in Anaheim, California, United States (1984)	List of Worldcons; 43rd World Science Fiction Convention; Aussiecon Two in Melbourne, Australia (1985)	Succeeded by 44th World Science Fiction Convention; ConFederation in Atlanta, Georgia, United States (1986)
