= Hugo Award for Best Related Work =

Annual awards for science fiction or fantasy non-fiction

- Awarded for: The best work related to the field of science fiction, fantasy, or fandom, published in the prior calendar year and which is either non-fiction or noteworthy primarily for aspects other than the fictional text
- Presented by: World Science Fiction Society
- First award: 1980
- Most recent winner: Ada Palmer (Inventing the Renaissance)
- Website: thehugoawards.org

The Hugo Award for Best Related Work is one of the Hugo Awards given each year for primarily non-fiction works related to science fiction or fantasy, published or translated into English during the previous calendar year. The Hugo Awards have been described as "a fine showcase for speculative fiction" and "the best known literary award for science fiction writing".

It was originally titled the Hugo Award for Best Non-Fiction Book and was first awarded in 1980. In 1998 the Award was retitled to the Hugo Award for Best Related Book, and eligibility was officially expanded to fiction works that were primarily noteworthy for reasons besides their fictional aspects. In 2010, the title of the award was again changed, to the Hugo Award for Best Related Work. In addition to the regular Hugo awards, between 1996 and 2025, Retrospective Hugo Awards or "Retro-Hugos" were available for works published 50, 75, or 100 years prior. Retro-Hugos could only be awarded for years after 1939 in which no awards were originally given. The Retro-Hugo for Best Related Work was awarded for 1945 and 1954.

During the 49 nomination years, 260 individuals and 2 organizations have had works as finalists; 61 people and 1 organization have won, including co-authors and Retro Hugos. John Clute has won four times; once by himself, once with John Grant as a co-author, once with Peter Nicholls, and once with Nicholls, David Langford, and Graham Sleight. Nicholls has won a third time, and Grant has won a second time, sharing the award with his co-authors Elizabeth L. Humphrey and Pamela D. Scoville. Thomas Disch and Ursula K. Le Guin have also won twice, both without co-authors; no other author has won more than once. The Organization for Transformative Works was the organization that won, for its Archive of Our Own fanwork repository, while the Reddit r/Fantasy Bingo team was a finalist for their 2024 Bingo Reading Challenge. Cathy and Arnie Fenner have has final ballot nominations eight times for their work on writing and editing the Spectrum: The Best In Contemporary Fantastic Art series, both the most nominations received by any author/editor and the most nominations without winning. Clute has been nominated seven times and Farah Mendlesohn seven times with one win; Le Guin five times with two wins; Isaac Asimov and Langford four times with one win; and Mike Resnick four times with no wins. The Writing Excuses team, consisting of Brandon Sanderson, Dan Wells, Howard Tayler, Mary Robinette Kowal, and Jordan Sanderson, have been nominated four times and won once. Seven other authors have been nominated three times. Many of these writers, editors, and artists have won Hugos in other categories, from Fan Writer to Best Novel.

== Selection ==
Hugo Award nominees and winners are chosen by supporting or attending members of the annual non-profit World Science Fiction Convention, or Worldcon, and the presentation evening constitutes its central event. The selection process is defined in the World Science Fiction Society Constitution as instant-runoff voting with six finalists, except in the case of a tie. The works on the ballot are the six most-nominated by members that year, with no limit on the number of works that can be nominated. Initial nominations are made by members in January through March, while voting on the ballot of six finalists is performed roughly in April through July, subject to change depending on when that year's Worldcon is held. Prior to 2017, the final ballot was five works; it was changed that year to six, with each initial nominator limited to five nominations. Worldcons are generally held near the start of September, and are held in a different city around the world each year. Members are permitted to vote "no award", if they feel that none of the finalists is deserving of the award that year, and in the case that "no award" takes the majority the Hugo is not given in that category. This happened in the Best Related Work category in 2015 and 2016.

== Winners and finalists ==
In the following table, the years correspond to the date of the ceremony, rather than when the work was first published. Each date links to the "year in literature" article corresponding with when the work was eligible. Entries with a yellow background and an asterisk (*) next to the author's name have won the award; those with a gray background are the finalists on the short-list.

* Winners and joint winners
+ No winner selected

Winners and finalists
Year	Author(s)	Work	Publisher or publication	Ref.
1980	Peter Nicholls*	The Science Fiction Encyclopedia	Doubleday	
1980	Isaac Asimov	In Memory Yet Green	Doubleday	
1980	Wayne Barlowe	Barlowe's Guide to Extraterrestrials	Workman Publishing Company	
1980	Ian Summers	Barlowe's Guide to Extraterrestrials	Workman Publishing Company	
1980	Michael Whelan	Wonderworks	The Donning Company	
1980	Ursula K. Le Guin	The Language of the Night	Putnam Publishing Group	
1980	Susan Wood	The Language of the Night	Putnam Publishing Group	
1981	Carl Sagan*	Cosmos	Random House	
1981	Isaac Asimov	In Joy Still Felt	Doubleday	
1981	Charles Platt	Dream Makers	Berkley Books	
1981	Vincent Di Fate	Di Fate's Catalog of Science Fiction Hardware	Workman Publishing Company	
1981	Ian Summers	Di Fate's Catalog of Science Fiction Hardware	Workman Publishing Company	
1981	Richard Bergeron	Warhoon 28 (The Writings of Walter A. Willis)	Richard Bergeron	
1982	Stephen King*	Danse Macabre	Everest Publishing	
1982	Leo Dillon	The Art of Leo & Diane Dillon	Ballantine Books	
1982	Diane Dillon	The Art of Leo & Diane Dillon	Ballantine Books	
1982	Byron Preiss	The Art of Leo & Diane Dillon	Ballantine Books	
1982	Ron Miller	The Grand Tour	Workman Publishing Company	
1982	William K. Hartmann	The Grand Tour	Workman Publishing Company	
1982	Dougal Dixon	After Man: A Zoology of the Future	Macmillan Publishers	
1982	Neil Barron	Anatomy of Wonder, 2nd Edition	R.R. Bowker	
1983	James Gunn*	Isaac Asimov: The Foundations of Science Fiction	Oxford University Press	
1983	J. J. Llewellyn	The World of the Dark Crystal	Alfred A. Knopf	
1983	Brian Froud	The World of the Dark Crystal	Alfred A. Knopf	
1983	Baird Searles	A Reader's Guide to Fantasy	Avon Publications	
1983	Beth Meacham	A Reader's Guide to Fantasy	Avon Publications	
1983	Michael Franklin	A Reader's Guide to Fantasy	Avon Publications	
1983	Barry N. Malzberg	The Engines of the Night	Doubleday	
1983	Tim Underwood	Fear Itself: The Horror Fiction of Stephen King	Underwood-Miller	
1983	Chuck Miller	Fear Itself: The Horror Fiction of Stephen King	Underwood-Miller	
1984	Donald H. Tuck*	The Encyclopedia of Science Fiction and Fantasy, Vol. 3: Miscellaneous	Advent	
1984	Joy Chant	The High Kings	Bantam Books	
1984	Charles Platt	Dream Makers, Volume II	Berkley Books	
1984	Norman Spinrad	Staying Alive: A Writer's Guide	The Donning Company	
1984	Rowena Morrill	The Fantastic Art of Rowena	Pocket Books	
1985	Jack Williamson*	Wonder's Child: My Life in Science Fiction	Bluejay Books	
1985	Patti Perret	The Faces of Science Fiction	Analog Science Fact & Fiction	
1985	Harlan Ellison	Sleepless Nights in the Procrustean Bed	Borgo Press	
1985	George Turner	In the Heart or in the Head: An Essay in Time Travel	Analog Science Fact & Fiction	
1985	Willis E. McNelly	The Dune Encyclopedia	Berkley Putnam	
1986	Tom Weller*	Science Made Stupid	Houghton Mifflin Harcourt	
1986	Perry A. Chapdelaine, Sr.	The John W. Campbell Letters, Vol. 1	AC Projects	
1986	Tony Chapdelaine	The John W. Campbell Letters, Vol. 1	AC Projects	
1986	George Hay	The John W. Campbell Letters, Vol. 1	AC Projects	
1986	Harlan Ellison	An Edge in My Voice	The Donning Company	
1986	Algis Budrys	Benchmarks: Galaxy Bookshelf	Southern Illinois University Press	
1986	Brian Aldiss	The Pale Shadow of Science	Serconia Press	
1986	Douglas E. Winter	Faces of Fear: Encounters with the Creators of Modern Horror	Berkley Books	
1987	Brian Aldiss*	Trillion Year Spree	Victor Gollancz Ltd	
1987	David Wingrove*	Trillion Year Spree	Victor Gollancz Ltd	
1987	Frank Miller	Batman: The Dark Knight Returns	DC Comics	
1987	Klaus Janson	Batman: The Dark Knight Returns	DC Comics	
1987	Lynn Varley	Batman: The Dark Knight Returns	DC Comics	
1987	Thomas G. Smith	Industrial Light and Magic	Del Rey Books	
1987	Charles N. Brown	Science Fiction In Print: 1985	Locus Press	
1987	William G. Contento	Science Fiction In Print: 1985	Locus Press	
1987	Paul Williams	Only Apparently Real: The World of Philip K. Dick	Arbor House	
1988	Michael Whelan*	Michael Whelan's Works of Wonder	Del Rey Books	
1988	David A. Cherry	Imagination: The Art & Technique of David A. Cherry	Starblaze Graphics	
1988	Jack Matthews	The Battle of Brazil	Crown Publishing Group	
1988	Neil Barron	Anatomy of Wonder, 3rd Edition	R.R. Bowker	
1988	Charles N. Brown	Science Fiction, Fantasy, & Horror: 1986	Locus Press	
1988	William G. Contento	Science Fiction, Fantasy, & Horror: 1986	Locus Press	
1989	Samuel R. Delany*	The Motion of Light in Water: Sex and Science Fiction Writing in the East Village 1957-1965	Arbor House	
1989	Don Maitz	First Maitz	Ursus Publishing	
1989	James Gunn	The New Encyclopedia of Science Fiction	Viking Press	
1989	Robert Weinberg	A Biographical Dictionary of Science Fiction and Fantasy Artists	Greenwood Publishing Group	
1989	Charles N. Brown	Science Fiction, Fantasy, & Horror: 1987	Locus Press	
1989	William G. Contento	Science Fiction, Fantasy, & Horror: 1987	Locus Press	
1990	Alexei Panshin*	The World Beyond the Hill: Science Fiction and the Quest for Transcendence	J. P. Tarcher	
1990	Cory Panshin*	The World Beyond the Hill: Science Fiction and the Quest for Transcendence	J. P. Tarcher	
1990	Robert A. Heinlein	Grumbles from the Grave	Del Rey Books	
1990	Ursula K. Le Guin	Dancing at the Edge of the World	Grove Press	
1990	Arthur C. Clarke	Astounding Days	Victor Gollancz Ltd	
1990	Harlan Ellison	Harlan Ellison's Watching	Underwood-Miller	
1990	Greg Thokar	Noreascon 3 Souvenir Book	Massachusetts Convention Fandom, Inc	
1991	Orson Scott Card*	How to Write Science Fiction and Fantasy	Writer's Digest	
1991	Norman Spinrad	Science Fiction in the Real World	Southern Illinois University Press	
1991	Kristine Kathryn Rusch	Science Fiction Writers of America Handbook	Writer's Notebook Press	
1991	Dean Wesley Smith	Science Fiction Writers of America Handbook	Writer's Notebook Press	
1991	Brian Aldiss	Bury My Heart at W.H. Smith's	Hodder & Stoughton	
1991	David J. Skal	Hollywood Gothic	W. W. Norton & Company	
1992	Charles Addams*	The World of Charles Addams	Alfred A. Knopf	
1992	Everett F. Bleiler	Science-Fiction: The Early Years	Kent State University Press	
1992	Jack L. Chalker	The Science Fantasy Publishers: A Critical and Bibliographic History: Third Edition	Mirage Press	
1992	Mark Owings	The Science Fantasy Publishers: A Critical and Bibliographic History: Third Edition	Mirage Press	
1992	Jeanne Gomoll	The Bakery Men Don't See Cookbook	(SF)^{3}	
1992	Stephen Jones	Clive Barker's Shadows in Eden	Underwood-Miller	
1993	Harry Warner, Jr.*	A Wealth of Fable: An Informal History of Science Fiction Fandom in the 1950s	SCIFI Press	
1993	David Langford	Let's Hear It for the Deaf Man	NESFA Press	
1993	Virgil Finlay	Virgil Finlay's Women of the Ages	Underwood-Miller	
1993	Thom Boswell	The Costumemaker's Art	Lark Books	
1993	Camille Bacon-Smith	Enterprising Women: Television Fandom and the Creation of Popular Myth	University of Pennsylvania Press	
1993	Damon Knight	Monad Number Two	Pulphouse Publishing	
1994	John Clute*	The Encyclopedia of Science Fiction	Orbit Books	
1994	Peter Nicholls*	The Encyclopedia of Science Fiction	Orbit Books	
1994	Michael Whelan	The Art of Michael Whelan: Scenes/Visions	Bantam Spectra	
1994	Robert Bloch	Once Around the Bloch: An Unauthorized Autobiography	Tor Books	
1994	Scott McCloud	Understanding Comics: The Invisible Art	Tundra Books	
1994	Theodore Cogswell	PITFCS: Proceedings of the Institute for Twenty-First Century Studies	Advent	
1995	Isaac Asimov*	I. Asimov: A Memoir	Doubleday	
1995	Christopher Priest	The Book on the Edge of Forever	Fantagraphics Books	
1995	Samuel R. Delany	Silent Interviews: On Language, Race, Sex, Science Fiction, and Some Comics	University Press of New England	
1995	Teresa Nielsen Hayden	Making Book	NESFA Press	
1995	Cathy Fenner	Spectrum: The Best In Contemporary Fantastic Art	Underwood Books	
1995	Arnie Fenner	Spectrum: The Best In Contemporary Fantastic Art	Underwood Books	
1996	John Clute*	Science Fiction: The Illustrated Encyclopedia	Dorling Kindersley	
1996	Isaac Asimov	Yours, Isaac Asimov	Doubleday	
1996	Bob Eggleton	Alien Horizons: The Fantastic Art of Bob Eggleton	Paper Tiger Books	
1996	Cathy Fenner	Spectrum 2: The Best in Contemporary Fantastic Art	Underwood Books	
1996	Arnie Fenner	Spectrum 2: The Best in Contemporary Fantastic Art	Underwood Books	
1996	Joanna Russ	To Write Like a Woman: Essays in Feminism and Science Fiction	Indiana University Press	
1997	L. Sprague de Camp*	Time & Chance: An Autobiography	Donald M. Grant	
1997	Diana Wynne Jones	The Tough Guide To Fantasyland	Vista Books	
1997	John Clute	Look at the Evidence	Serconia Press	
1997	David Langford	The Silence of the Langford	NESFA Press	
1997	Patti Perret	The Faces of Fantasy	Tor Books	
1998	John Clute*	The Encyclopedia of Fantasy	Orbit Books	
1998	John Grant*	The Encyclopedia of Fantasy	Orbit Books	
1998	Vincent Di Fate	Infinite Worlds: The Fantastic Visions of Science Fiction Art	Penguin Studio	
1998	Ben Bova	Space Travel	Writer's Digest Books	
1998	Anthony R. Lewis	Space Travel	Writer's Digest Books	
1998	Robert Silverberg	Reflections and Refractions: Thoughts on Science-Fiction, Science and Other Matters	Underwood Books	
1998	Cathy Fenner	Spectrum 4: The Best in Contemporary Fantastic Art	Underwood Books	
1998	Arnie Fenner	Spectrum 4: The Best in Contemporary Fantastic Art	Underwood Books	
1998	Jim Loehr	Spectrum 4: The Best in Contemporary Fantastic Art	Underwood Books	
1999	Thomas Disch*	The Dreams Our Stuff Is Made Of: How Science Fiction Conquered the World	Free Press	
1999	Richard A. Hauptmann	The Work of Jack Williamson: An Annotated Bibliography and Guide	NESFA Press	
1999	Everett F. Bleiler	Science-Fiction: The Gernsback Years	Kent State University Press	
1999	Howard DeVore	The Hugo, Nebula and World Fantasy Awards	Advent	
1999	Cathy Fenner	Spectrum 5: The Best in Contemporary Fantastic Art	Underwood Books	
1999	Arnie Fenner	Spectrum 5: The Best in Contemporary Fantastic Art	Underwood Books	
2000	Frank M. Robinson*	Science Fiction of the 20th Century	Collector's Press	
2000	Neil Gaiman	The Sandman: The Dream Hunters	Vertigo	
2000	Yoshitaka Amano	The Sandman: The Dream Hunters	Vertigo	
2000	Terry Pratchett	The Science of Discworld	Ebury Publishing	
2000	Ian Stewart	The Science of Discworld	Ebury Publishing	
2000	Jack Cohen	The Science of Discworld	Ebury Publishing	
2000	Cathy Fenner	Spectrum 6: The Best in Contemporary Fantastic Art	Underwood Books	
2000	Arnie Fenner	Spectrum 6: The Best in Contemporary Fantastic Art	Underwood Books	
2000	Karen Cooper	Minicon 34 Restaurant Guide	Rune Press	
2000	Bruce Schneier	Minicon 34 Restaurant Guide	Rune Press	
2001	Bob Eggleton*	Greetings from Earth: The Art of Bob Eggleton	Paper Tiger Books	
2001	Nigel Suckling*	Greetings from Earth: The Art of Bob Eggleton	Paper Tiger Books	
2001	James Gifford	Robert A. Heinlein: A Reader's Companion	Nitrosyncretic Press	
2001	Anthony R. Lewis	Concordance to Cordwainer Smith, Third Edition	NESFA Press	
2001	Andrew M. Butler	Terry Pratchett: Guilty of Literature	Science Fiction Foundation	
2001	Edward James	Terry Pratchett: Guilty of Literature	Science Fiction Foundation	
2001	Farah Mendlesohn	Terry Pratchett: Guilty of Literature	Science Fiction Foundation	
2001	Mike Resnick	Putting It Together: Turning Sow's Ear Drafts Into Silk Purse Stories	Wildside Press	
2002	Ron Miller*	The Art of Chesley Bonestell	Paper Tiger Books	
2002	Frederick C. Durant III*	The Art of Chesley Bonestell	Paper Tiger Books	
2002	Melvin H. Schuetz*	The Art of Chesley Bonestell	Paper Tiger Books	
2002	Michael Swanwick	Being Gardner Dozois	Old Earth Books	
2002	Tom Shippey	J. R. R. Tolkien: Author of the Century	HarperCollins	
2002	Karen Haber	Meditations on Middle-earth	St. Martin's Press	
2002	Jane Frank	The Art of Richard Powers	Paper Tiger Books	
2002	Howard Frank	The Art of Richard Powers	Paper Tiger Books	
2002	Mike Resnick	I Have This Nifty Idea...Now What Do I Do With It?	Wildside Press	
2003	Judith Merril*	Better to Have Loved: The Life of Judith Merril	Between the Lines	
2003	Emily Pohl-Weary*	Better to Have Loved: The Life of Judith Merril	Between the Lines	
2003	Jerry Weist	Ray Bradbury: An Illustrated Life	William Morrow and Company	
2003	Bob Eggleton	Dragonhenge	Paper Tiger Books	
2003	John Grant	Dragonhenge	Paper Tiger Books	
2003	Cathy Fenner	Spectrum 9: The Best in Contemporary Fantastic Art	Underwood Books	
2003	Arnie Fenner	Spectrum 9: The Best in Contemporary Fantastic Art	Underwood Books	
2003	Justine Larbalestier	The Battle of the Sexes in Science Fiction	Wesleyan University Press	
2004	John Grant*	The Chesley Awards for SF & Fantasy Art: A Retrospective	Artist's and Photographer's Press	
2004	Elizabeth L. Humphrey*	The Chesley Awards for SF & Fantasy Art: A Retrospective	Artist's and Photographer's Press	
2004	Pamela D. Scoville*	The Chesley Awards for SF & Fantasy Art: A Retrospective	Artist's and Photographer's Press	
2004	Jeff VanderMeer (editor)	The Thackery T. Lambshead Pocket Guide to Eccentric & Discredited Diseases	Night Shade Books	
2004	Mark Roberts (editor)	The Thackery T. Lambshead Pocket Guide to Eccentric & Discredited Diseases	Night Shade Books	
2004	Cathy Fenner	Spectrum 10: The Best in Contemporary Fantastic Art	Underwood Books	
2004	Arnie Fenner	Spectrum 10: The Best in Contemporary Fantastic Art	Underwood Books	
2004	Brian Herbert	Dreamer of Dune: The Biography of Frank Herbert	Tor Books	
2004	John Clute	Scores: Reviews 1993–2003	Beccon Publications	
2004	William J. Widder	Master Storyteller: An Illustrated Tour of the Fiction of L. Ron Hubbard	Galaxy Press	
2005	Edward James*	The Cambridge Companion to Science Fiction	Cambridge University Press	
2005	Farah Mendlesohn*	The Cambridge Companion to Science Fiction	Cambridge University Press	
2005	Peter Weston	With Stars in My Eyes: My Adventures in British Fandom	NESFA Press	
2005	David A. Hardy	Futures: 50 Years in Space: The Challenge of the Stars	Artists' and Photographers' Press	
2005	Patrick Moore	Futures: 50 Years in Space: The Challenge of the Stars	Artists' and Photographers' Press	
2005	William Tenn	Dancing Naked: The Unexpurgated William Tenn, Volume 3	NESFA Press	
2005	Richard A. Lupoff	The Best of Xero	Tachyon Publications	
2006	Kate Wilhelm*	Storyteller: Writing Lessons and More from 27 Years of the Clarion Writers' Workshop	Small Beer Press	
2006	Mike Ashley	Transformations: The Story of the Science Fiction Magazines from 1950 to 1970	Liverpool University Press	
2006	David Langford	The SEX Column and Other Misprints	Cosmos	
2006	Gary Westfahl	Science Fiction Quotations	Yale University Press	
2006	Gary K. Wolfe	Soundings, Reviews 1992–1996	Beccon Publications	
2007	Julie Phillips*	James Tiptree, Jr.: The Double Life of Alice B. Sheldon	St. Martin's Press	
2007	Mike Resnick	Worldcon Guest of Honor Speeches	ISFiC Press	
2007	Joe Siclari	Worldcon Guest of Honor Speeches	ISFiC Press	
2007	Joseph T. Major	Heinlein's Children: The Juveniles	Advent	
2007	Samuel R. Delany	About Writing: Seven Essays, Four Letters, and Five Interviews	Wesleyan University Press	
2007	John Picacio	Cover Story: The Art of John Picacio	MonkeyBrain Books	
2008	Jeff Prucher*	Brave New Words: the Oxford Dictionary of Science Fiction	Oxford University Press	
2008	Barry N. Malzberg	Breakfast in the Ruins: Science Fiction in the Last Millennium	Baen Books	
2008	Diana Glyer	The Company They Keep: C. S. Lewis and J. R. R. Tolkien as Writers in Community	Kent State University Press	
2008	Luis Ortiz	Emshwiller: Infinity x Two	Nonstop Press	
2008	Shaun Tan	The Arrival	Arthur A. Levine Books	
2009	John Scalzi*	Your Hate Mail Will be Graded: A Decade of Whatever, 1998–2008	Subterranean Press	
2009	Farah Mendlesohn	Rhetorics of Fantasy	Wesleyan University Press	
2009	Paul Kincaid	What Is It We Do When We Read Science Fiction	Beccon Publications	
2009	Lillian Stewart Carl	The Vorkosigan Companion: The Universe of Lois McMaster Bujold	Baen Books	
2009	John Helfers	The Vorkosigan Companion: The Universe of Lois McMaster Bujold	Baen Books	
2009	Cathy Fenner	Spectrum 15: The Best in Contemporary Fantastic Art	Underwood Books	
2009	Arnie Fenner	Spectrum 15: The Best in Contemporary Fantastic Art	Underwood Books	
2010	Jack Vance*	This is Me, Jack Vance! (Or, More Properly, This is "I")	Subterranean Press	
2010	John Clute	Canary Fever: Reviews	Beccon Publications	
2010	Michael Swanwick	Hope-In-The-Mist: The Extraordinary Career and Mysterious Life of Hope Mirrlees	Temporary Culture	
2010	Farah Mendlesohn	The Inter-Galactic Playground: A Critical Study of Children's and Teens' Science Fiction	McFarland & Company	
2010	Farah Mendlesohn	On Joanna Russ	Wesleyan University Press	
2010	Helen Merrick	The Secret Feminist Cabal: A Cultural History of SF Feminisms	Aqueduct Press	
2011	Lynne M. Thomas*	Chicks Dig Time Lords: A Celebration of Doctor Who by the Women Who Love It	Mad Norwegian Press	
2011	Tara O'Shea*	Chicks Dig Time Lords: A Celebration of Doctor Who by the Women Who Love It	Mad Norwegian Press	
2011	Gary K. Wolfe	Bearings: Reviews 1997-2001	Beccon Publications	
2011	Mike Resnick	The Business of Science Fiction: Two Insiders Discuss Writing and Publishing	McFarland & Company	
2011	Barry N. Malzberg	The Business of Science Fiction: Two Insiders Discuss Writing and Publishing	McFarland & Company	
2011	William H. Patterson, Jr.	Robert A. Heinlein: In Dialogue with His Century, Volume 1: (1907–1948): Learning Curve	Tor Books	
2011	Brandon Sanderson	Writing Excuses, Season 4	Writing Excuses	
2011	Jordan Sanderson	Writing Excuses, Season 4	Writing Excuses	
2011	Howard Tayler	Writing Excuses, Season 4	Writing Excuses	
2011	Dan Wells	Writing Excuses, Season 4	Writing Excuses	
2012	John Clute*	The Encyclopedia of Science Fiction, Third Edition	Victor Gollancz Ltd	
2012	David Langford*	The Encyclopedia of Science Fiction, Third Edition	Victor Gollancz Ltd	
2012	Peter Nicholls*	The Encyclopedia of Science Fiction, Third Edition	Victor Gollancz Ltd	
2012	Graham Sleight*	The Encyclopedia of Science Fiction, Third Edition	Victor Gollancz Ltd	
2012	Daniel M. Kimmel	Jar Jar Binks Must Die…and other Observations about Science Fiction Movies	Fantastic Books	
2012	Jeff VanderMeer	The Steampunk Bible: An Illustrated Guide to the World of Imaginary Airships, Corsets and Goggles, Mad Scientists, and Strange Literature	Abrams Image	
2012	S. J. Chambers	The Steampunk Bible: An Illustrated Guide to the World of Imaginary Airships, Corsets and Goggles, Mad Scientists, and Strange Literature	Abrams Image	
2012	Seanan McGuire	Wicked Girls	Seanan McGuire	
2012	Brandon Sanderson	Writing Excuses, Season 6	Writing Excuses	
2012	Dan Wells	Writing Excuses, Season 6	Writing Excuses	
2012	Howard Tayler	Writing Excuses, Season 6	Writing Excuses	
2012	Mary Robinette Kowal	Writing Excuses, Season 6	Writing Excuses	
2012	Jordan Sanderson	Writing Excuses, Season 6	Writing Excuses	
2013	Brandon Sanderson*	Writing Excuses, Season 7	Writing Excuses	
2013	Dan Wells*	Writing Excuses, Season 7	Writing Excuses	
2013	Howard Tayler*	Writing Excuses, Season 7	Writing Excuses	
2013	Mary Robinette Kowal*	Writing Excuses, Season 7	Writing Excuses	
2013	Jordan Sanderson*	Writing Excuses, Season 7	Writing Excuses	
2013	Edward James	The Cambridge Companion to Fantasy Literature	Cambridge University Press	
2013	Farah Mendlesohn	The Cambridge Companion to Fantasy Literature	Cambridge University Press	
2013	Lynne M. Thomas	Chicks Dig Comics: A Celebration of Comic Books by the Women Who Love Them	Mad Norwegian Press	
2013	Sigrid Ellis	Chicks Dig Comics: A Celebration of Comic Books by the Women Who Love Them	Mad Norwegian Press	
2013	Deborah Stanish	Chicks Unravel Time: Women Journey Through Every Season of Doctor Who	Mad Norwegian Press	
2013	L. M. Myles	Chicks Unravel Time: Women Journey Through Every Season of Doctor Who	Mad Norwegian Press	
2013	Martin H. Greenberg	I Have an Idea for a Book... The Bibliography of Martin H. Greenberg	Battered Silicon Dispatch Box	
2013	John Helfers	I Have an Idea for a Book... The Bibliography of Martin H. Greenberg	Battered Silicon Dispatch Box	
2014	Kameron Hurley*	"We Have Always Fought: Challenging the Women, Cattle and Slaves Narrative"	A Dribble of Ink	
2014	Michael Damian Thomas	Queers Dig Time Lords: A Celebration of Doctor Who by the LGBTQ Fans Who Love It	Mad Norwegian Press	
2014	Sigrid Ellis	Queers Dig Time Lords: A Celebration of Doctor Who by the LGBTQ Fans Who Love It	Mad Norwegian Press	
2014	Justin Landon	Speculative Fiction 2012: The Best Online Reviews, Essays and Commentary	Jurassic London	
2014	Jared Shurin	Speculative Fiction 2012: The Best Online Reviews, Essays and Commentary	Jurassic London	
2014	Jeff VanderMeer	Wonderbook: The Illustrated Guide to Creating Imaginative Fiction	Abrams Image	
2014	Jeremy Zerfoss	Wonderbook: The Illustrated Guide to Creating Imaginative Fiction	Abrams Image	
2014	Brandon Sanderson	Writing Excuses, Season 8	Writing Excuses	
2014	Dan Wells	Writing Excuses, Season 8	Writing Excuses	
2014	Howard Tayler	Writing Excuses, Season 8	Writing Excuses	
2014	Mary Robinette Kowal	Writing Excuses, Season 8	Writing Excuses	
2014	Jordan Sanderson	Writing Excuses, Season 8	Writing Excuses	
2015	(no award)+			(Note: Several categories, including Best Related Work, were awarded to "No award" in 2015 and 2016 in response to the Sad Puppies and Rabid Puppies ballot manipulation campaigns.)
2015	Ken Burnside	"The Hot Equations: Thermodynamics and Military SF"	Riding the Red Horse (Castalia House)	
2015	Lou Antonelli	Letters from Gardner	The Merry Blacksmith Press	
2015	John C. Wright	Transhuman and Subhuman: Essays on Science Fiction and Awful Truth	Castalia House	
2015	Tedd Roberts	"Why Science is Never Settled"	Baen.com	
2015	Michael Z. Williamson	Wisdom from My Internet	Patriarchy Press	
2016	(no award)+			
2016	Marc Aramini	Between Light and Shadow: An Exploration of the Fiction of Gene Wolfe, 1951 to 1986	Castalia House	
2016	Jeffro Johnson	"The First Draft of My Appendix N Book"	jeffro.wordpress.com	
2016	Daniel Eness	"Safe Space as Rape Room"	castaliahouse.com	
2016	Vox Day	SJWs Always Lie: Taking Down the Thought Police	Castalia House	
2016	Moira Greyland	"The Story of Moira Greyland"	askthebigot.com	
2017	Ursula K. Le Guin*	Words Are My Matter: Writings About Life and Books, 2000-2016	Small Beer Press	
2017	Kameron Hurley	The Geek Feminist Revolution	Tor Books	
2017	Carrie Fisher	The Princess Diarist	Blue Rider Press	
2017	Robert Silverberg	Traveler of Worlds: Conversations with Robert Silverberg	Fairwood	
2017	Alvaro Zinos-Amaro	Traveler of Worlds: Conversations with Robert Silverberg	Fairwood	
2017	Neil Gaiman	The View From the Cheap Seats	William Morrow	
2017	Sarah Gailey	The Women of Harry Potter posts	Tor.com	
2018	Ursula K. Le Guin*	No Time to Spare: Thinking About What Matters	Houghton Mifflin Harcourt	
2018	Zoe Quinn	Crash Override: How Gamergate (Nearly) Destroyed My Life, and How We Can Win the Fight Against Online Hate	PublicAffairs	
2018	Paul Kincaid	Iain M. Banks (Modern Masters of Science Fiction)	University of Illinois Press	
2018	Nat Segaloff	A Lit Fuse: The Provocative Life of Harlan Ellison	NESFA Press	
2018	Alexandra Pierce	Luminescent Threads: Connections to Octavia E. Butler	Twelfth Planet Press	
2018	Mimi Mondal	Luminescent Threads: Connections to Octavia E. Butler	Twelfth Planet Press	
2018	Liz Bourke	Sleeping with Monsters: Readings and Reactions in Science Fiction and Fantasy	Aqueduct Press	
2019	Organization for Transformative Works*	Archive of Our Own	Self-published	
2019	Alec Nevala-Lee	Astounding: John W. Campbell, Isaac Asimov, Robert A. Heinlein, L. Ron Hubbard, and the Golden Age of Science Fiction	Dey Street Books	
2019	Lindsay Ellis	The Hobbit Duology	Self-published via YouTube	
2019	Angelina Meehan	The Hobbit Duology	Self-published via YouTube	
2019	Jo Walton	An Informal History of the Hugos: A Personal Look Back at the Hugo Awards, 1953-2000	Tor Books	
2019	Julia Rios	www.mexicanxinitiative.com: The Mexicanx Initiative at Worldcon 76	Self-published	
2019	Libia Brenda	www.mexicanxinitiative.com: The Mexicanx Initiative at Worldcon 76	Self-published	
2019	Pablo Defendini	www.mexicanxinitiative.com: The Mexicanx Initiative at Worldcon 76	Self-published	
2019	John Picacio	www.mexicanxinitiative.com: The Mexicanx Initiative at Worldcon 76	Self-published	
2019	Ursula K. Le Guin	Ursula K. Le Guin: Conversations on Writing	Tin House Books	
2019	David Naimon	Ursula K. Le Guin: Conversations on Writing	Tin House Books	
2020	Jeannette Ng*	"2019 John W. Campbell Award Acceptance Speech"	Live presentation	
2020	J. Michael Straczynski	Becoming Superman: My Journey from Poverty to Hollywood	Harper Voyager	
2020	Gwyneth Jones	Joanna Russ	University of Illinois Press	
2020	Mallory O'Meara	The Lady from the Black Lagoon: Hollywood Monsters and the Lost Legacy of Milicent Patrick	Hanover Square Press	
2020	Farah Mendlesohn	The Pleasant Profession of Robert A. Heinlein	Unbound	
2020	Arwen Curry	Worlds of Ursula K. Le Guin	Arwen Curry	
2021	Maria Dahvana Headley*	Beowulf: A New Translation	Farrar, Straus and Giroux	
2021	Claire Rousseau	CoNZealand Fringe	Self-published	
2021	C	CoNZealand Fringe	Self-published	
2021	Cassie Hart	CoNZealand Fringe	Self-published	
2021	Adri Joy	CoNZealand Fringe	Self-published	
2021	Marguerite Kenner	CoNZealand Fringe	Self-published	
2021	Cheryl Morgan	CoNZealand Fringe	Self-published	
2021	Alasdair Stuart	CoNZealand Fringe	Self-published	
2021	L. D. Lewis	FIYAHCON	Self-published	
2021	Brent Lambert	FIYAHCON	Self-published	
2021	Iori Kusano	FIYAHCON	Self-published	
2021	Vida Cruz	FIYAHCON	Self-published	
2021	Natalie Luhrs	"George R.R. Martin Can Fuck Off into the Sun; Or, The 2020 Hugo Awards Ceremony (Rageblog Edition)"	Pretty Terrible	
2021	Lynell George	A Handful of Earth, A Handful of Sky: The World of Octavia E. Butler	Angel City Press	
2021	Jenny Nicholson	The Last Bronycon: A Fandom Autopsy	Self-published via YouTube	
2022	Charlie Jane Anders*	Never Say You Can't Survive	Tordotcom Publishing	
2022	Elsa Sjunneson	Being Seen: One Deafblind Woman's Fight to End Ableism	Tiller Press	
2022	Camestros Felapton	The Complete Debarkle: Saga of a Culture War	Self-published	
2022	Andrew Nette (editor)	Dangerous Visions and New Worlds: Radical Science Fiction, 1950 to 1985	PM Press	
2022	Iain McIntyre (editor)	Dangerous Visions and New Worlds: Radical Science Fiction, 1950 to 1985	PM Press	
2022	Emily St. James	"How Twitter can ruin a life"	Vox	
2022	Josephine Riesman	True Believer: The Rise and Fall of Stan Lee	Crown	
2023	Rob Wilkins*	Terry Pratchett: A Life with Footnotes	Doubleday	
2023	Kyle Buchanan	Blood, Sweat & Chrome: The Wild and True Story of Mad Max: Fury Road	William Morrow	
2023	Lawrence M. Schoen	Buffalito World Outreach Project	Paper Golem	
2023	Yang Feng	Chinese Science Fiction: An Oral History, Volume 1	Chengdu Times Press	
2023	S. L. Huang	"The Ghost of Workshops Past"	Tor.com	
2023	Wil Wheaton	Still Just a Geek: An Annotated Memoir	William Morrow	
2024	Kelly Weinersmith*	A City on Mars	Penguin Press / Particular Books	
2024	Zach Weinersmith*	A City on Mars	Penguin Press / Particular Books	
2024	Niall Harrison	All These Worlds: Reviews & Essays	Briardene Books	
2024	Yang Feng	Chinese Science Fiction: An Oral History, Volumes 2 and 3	8-Light Minutes Culture / Chengdu Time Press	
2024	Iain M. Banks	The Culture: The Drawings	Orbit Books	
2024	Tina Wong	Discover X	Tina Wong	
2024	Maureen Kincaid Speller	A Traveller in Time: The Critical Practice of Maureen Kincaid Speller	Luna Press Publishing	
2024	Nina Allan (editor)	A Traveller in Time: The Critical Practice of Maureen Kincaid Speller	Luna Press Publishing	
2025	Jordan S. Carroll*	Speculative Whiteness: Science Fiction and the Alt-Right	University of Minnesota Press	
2025	Camestros Felapton	Charting the Cliff: An Investigation into the 2023 Hugo Nomination Statistics	File770	
2025	Heather Rose Jones	Charting the Cliff: An Investigation into the 2023 Hugo Nomination Statistics	File770	
2025	the r/Fantasy Bingo team	r/Fantasy's 2024 Bingo Reading Challenge	r/Fantasy on Reddit	
2025	Jenny Nicholson	The Spectacular Failure of the Star Wars Hotel	Self-published via YouTube	
2025	Abigail Nussbaum	Track Changes	Briardene Books	
2025	Chris M. Barkley	The 2023 Hugo Awards: A Report on Censorship and Exclusion	Genre Grapevine/File770	
2025	Jason Sanford	The 2023 Hugo Awards: A Report on Censorship and Exclusion	Genre Grapevine/File770	
2026	Ada Palmer*	Inventing the Renaissance	University of Chicago Press/Head of Zeus	
2026	Ashaya	Ragnarök vs the Long Night	History of Westeros	
2026	Aziz	Ragnarök vs the Long Night	History of Westeros	
2026	Paul Kincaid	Colourfields: Writing About Writing About Science Fiction	Briardene Books	
2026	Susana M. Morris	Positive Obsession: The Life and Times of Octavia Butler	Amistad	
2026	Renay	The Hugo Spreadsheet of Doom	Self-published	
2026	Elizabeth Sandifer	Last War in Albion: “The Cuddled Little Vice (Sandman)”	Eruditorum Press	

=== Retro Hugos ===
Between the 1996 Worldcon and 2025 Worldcon, the World Science Fiction Society had the concept of "Retro-Hugos", in which the Hugo award could be retroactively awarded for 50, 75, or 100 years prior. Retro-Hugos could only be awarded for years after 1939 (the year of the first Worldcon) in which no Hugos were originally awarded. Retro-Hugos were awarded for Best Related Work awarded twice, in 2004 and 2020; all other years it was not on the ballot or was dropped due to insufficient response.

Retro Hugo winners and nominees
Year	Year awarded	Author(s)	Work	Publisher	Ref.
1945	2020	Leigh Brackett*	"The Science-Fiction Field"	Writer's Digest	
1945	2020	Jack Speer	Fancyclopedia	Forrest J. Ackerman	
1945	2020	H. G. Wells	'42 To '44: A Contemporary Memoir Upon Human Behavior During the Crisis of the World Revolution	Secker & Warburg	
1945	2020	George Gamow	Mr. Tompkins Explores the Atom	Cambridge University Press	
1945	2020	Willy Ley	Rockets: The Future of Travel Beyond the Stratosphere	Viking Press	
1945	2020	Fritz Leiber	"The Works of H.P. Lovecraft: Suggestions for a Critical Appraisal"	The Acolyte	
1954	2004	Wernher von Braun*	Conquest of the Moon	Viking Press	
1954	2004	Fred L. Whipple*	Conquest of the Moon	Viking Press	
1954	2004	Willy Ley*	Conquest of the Moon	Viking Press	
1954	2004	L. Sprague de Camp	Science-Fiction Handbook	Hermitage Press	
1954	2004	Reginald Bretnor	Modern Science Fiction: Its Making and Future	Coward-McCann	
