= The Geek Feminist Revolution =

Book by Kameron Hurley

- Author: Kameron Hurley
- Language: English
- Subject: Feminism and geek culture
- Published: 31 May 2016 (Tor Books)
- Publication place: United States
- ISBN: 978-0765386236

The Geek Feminist Revolution is a collection of essays by American science fiction writer Kameron Hurley, published by Tor Books on 31 May 2016.

== Contents ==
The book collects several of Hurley's previously published blog posts, including "We Have Always Fought", which won the 2014 Hugo Award for Best Related Work. It also contains nine new essays written for the collection.

The scope of the writing ranges from "autobiographical reflection to literary criticism to world history and to commentary on the state of the geek world". It particularly examines the circumstances under which women participate in genre fiction in the face of a "cacophony of digital misogyny",, like that made public in the gamergate controversy, as well as the cultural reasons for this misogyny.

== Reception ==
Andrew Liptak of io9 described the "rightfully angry" collection as a "powerful and thoughtful examination of the professional world that helps construct the worlds we take part in". He noted that while Hurley's argument that patriarchal conditions in society allow for the behavior she examines was not new, but that it remained necessary because of the slow rate of change. In The Guardian, Damien Walter summarized the book as a "loving call to arms for geek culture's deconstruction and rebuilding in a new image", written in a combative style reflecting its outsider perspective and its origins in the often hostile atmosphere of Internet fora.

In a starred review, Publishers Weekly highlighted the collection's "exquisitely crafted yet deceptively casual, profanity-laced style", noting that, while Hurley was not the first to point out the "deep misogyny in 21st-century popular culture", she did so in a convincing and inspiring manner. Kirkus Reviews also emphasized the passion and commitment of Hurley's writing, but noted repetition in the book's contents and commented that readers occasionally felt like getting only half the experience from blog posts disconnected from their online context.

The book won the Locus Award for Best Non-fiction in 2016.
