= Glyer =

Glyer is a surname. Notable people with the surname include:

- Diana Pavlac Glyer (born 1956), American author, speaker and teacher
- Mike Glyer (born 1953), American editor and publisher
