= Jar Jar Binks Must Die =

2011 book by Daniel M. Kimmel

- First edition cover
- Author: Daniel M. Kimmel
- Language: English
- Genre: Nonfiction
- Publisher: Fantastic Books
- Publication date: March 2011
- Publication place: United States
- Media type: Trade paperback
- Pages: 191
- ISBN: 978-1-61720-061-8

Jar Jar Binks Must Die (subtitled ...and Other Observations about Science Fiction Movies) is a 2011 collection of 42 essays by film critic Daniel M. Kimmel, published in a trade paperback edition by Fantastic Books in March 2011, with a second printing following five months later.

Jar Jar Binks in the title is an aside to the Star Wars CGI character who was poorly received; the title gives voice to the extent of the lack of warmth his negative critics had over the controversy raised by Binks' characterization and what it was felt to engender.

The collection was a finalist for the Hugo Award for Best Related Work in 2012. Although it tied for first in nominations for eligible works, it placed fifth in the final voting. The essays originally appeared in such publications as Artemis Magazine, The Internet Review of Science Fiction, Clarkesworld and Space & Time.

== Reception ==
Elizabeth Hand wrote in F&SF that "Kimmel's a terrific guide to classic though underappreciated works such as Things to Come, and is especially sharp on 1950s sf movies, David Cronenberg, and the art (or lack of same) of movie remakes. ... [H]is brief essays are addictively readable and yes, a lot more fun than watching Revenge of the Sith."

Analog reviewer Don Sakers also praised the collection, saying, "Whether [Kimmel]'s explaining why Metropolis is such an important film, or joining in with the obligatory George Lucas bashing, his writing is intelligent and entertaining. You may disagree with him (in fact, you almost certainly will on something), but you can't say he doesn't give reasoned arguments in support of his positions. And his knowledge of SF movies is encyclopedic as hell."
