= History of Fox News =

Fox News Channel logo

The Fox News Channel (FNC) is an American basic cable and satellite news television channel that was founded by media mogul Rupert Murdoch in 1996. It competes as one of the top-three cable news networks in the United States, often leading its rivals MSNBC, and CNN.

== 1990s ==
=== Launch ===
The channel was created by Australian-born American media mogul Rupert Murdoch, who hired Roger Ailes as its founding CEO. The channel was launched on October 7, 1996 to 17 million cable subscribers. Prior to founding Fox News, Murdoch had gained significant experience in the 24-hour news business when News Corporation's British Sky Broadcasting subsidiary started Europe's first 24-hour news channel, Sky News, in the United Kingdom in 1989. With the success of his fourth network efforts in the United States, experience gained from Sky News, and turnaround of 20th Century Fox, Murdoch announced on January 31, 1996, that his company would be launching a 24-hour news channel to air on both cable and satellite systems as part of a News Corporation (News Corp) "worldwide platform" for Fox programming, saying, "The appetite for news – particularly news that explains to people how it affects them – is expanding enormously."

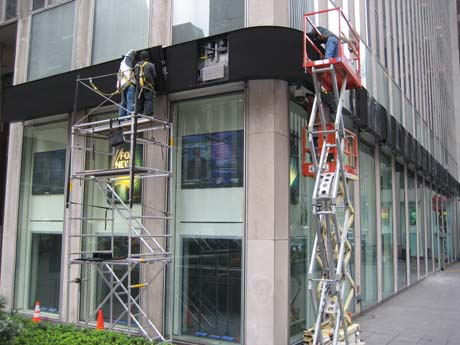
Exterior of the Fox News Channel studios in New York City

In February 1996, after former NBC executive and Republican Party political strategist Roger Ailes left America's Talking (now MSNBC), Murdoch called him to start the Fox News Channel. Ailes worked individuals through two months of 14-hour workdays and several weeks of rehearsal shows before launch, on October 7, 1996.

At launch, only 10 million households were able to watch Fox News, with none in the major media markets of New York City and Los Angeles. According to published reports, many media reviewers had to watch the first day's programming at Fox News' studios because it was not readily available. The rolling news coverage during the day consisted of 20-minute single topic shows like Fox on Crime or Fox on Politics surrounded by news headlines. Interviews had various facts at the bottom of the screen about the topic or the guest.

The debut Fox News anchors included Neil Cavuto and Tony Snow, but opinion programming quickly became the network's primary draw. The O'Reilly Report (1996–98, continued as The O'Reilly Factor 1998–17) and Hannity and Colmes (1996–2009) example the channel's debut programming schedule. The O'Reilly Report featured the conservative host Bill O'Reilly and was the network's top-rated program. Hannity and Colmes hosts, featured conservative Sean Hannity and liberal Alan Colmes, debating various daily news topics. Fox & Friends, a morning news section, debuted in 1998 and continues as a significant part of Fox News' daily programming. Fox News began using the slogan "fair and balanced" and officially adopted "We Report, You Decide" in 2008.

== 2000s ==
In the 2000 presidential election, Fox News, which was available in 56 million homes nationwide, saw a staggering 440% increase in viewers, the biggest gain among the three cable news television networks.

Accelerating in the 2000s, the role of conservative media and Fox News led to it being trusted by the Republican Party's base over that of traditional conservative elites.

Megyn Kelly, joined the channel in 2004 as a legal pundit and eventually got her own show, The Kelly File (2013–2017). Glenn Beck, joined the programming schedule in 2009 with his talk show, Glenn Beck (2009–11). Both enjoyed good ratings targeting the political policies of U.S. President Barack Obama.

The "fair and balanced" began to come under criticism as the network continued to feature several high profile Republicans. It included Sarah Palin during her 2008 election vice presidential candidacy, former speaker of the House of Representatives Newt Gingrich, Mike Huckabee during his 2008 and 2016 presidential candidacies, and Rick Santorum during his 2012 and 2016 presidential bids. Fox News also supported the aspirations of the Tea Party movement with their presenters such as Glenn Beck often echoing Tea Party talking points. The channel came under heavy scrutiny in 2010 when News Corporation donated $1 million to the Republican Governors Association.

== 2010s ==
In 2013, News Corporation was split into two publicly traded companies, with 21st Century Fox focusing on media, and News Corp focusing on publishing. Fox News was moved into 21st Century Fox during the split.

The influence of Fox News with the Republican Party base partly led to Donald Trump's victory in the Republican primaries against the wishes of a very weak party establishment and traditional power brokers. Fox News subsequently became solidly pro-Trump, and cultivated deep ties between itself and the government. For his first term, nearly 20 current and former Fox News hosts received administrative and cabinet-level positions in his administration.

The Fox News opinion line-up adapted to President Donald Trump 2016 candidacy. Frequent popular pundits Tucker Carlson and Laura Ingraham began hosting their shows that were often directly with President Trump's campaign and presidency. Tucker Carlson Tonight (2016–2023) debuted in 2016 and The Ingraham Angle (2017-) debuted the following year and enjoyed high popularity with the Fox News audience. This shift in editorial strategy led to tension between the news and opinion divisions at Fox News. Shepard Smith, who had been at Fox News since 1996 and lead anchor at the news division, left the network half way through his three-year contract in October 2019.

On March 19, 2019, the day before The Walt Disney Company completed its acquisition of 21st Century Fox, Fox's news and sports channels were spun off into Fox Corporation.

A series of lawsuits also dogged Fox News. Gretchen Carlson, claimed pervasive sexism Fox News and filed a sexual harassment against the CEO Roger Ailes. Ailes denied the allegations but resigned in that same month. 21st Century Fox settled the lawsuit, reportedly for $20 million, and issued a public apology. Fox News also dropped its "Fair and Balanced" motto, replacing it with "Most Watched, Most Trusted" allegedly due to its ties with Ailes' leadership. "We Report, You Decide" was not officially dropped and occasionally makes appearances. Bill O'Reilly was also accused in several sexual harassment lawsuits, though the Fox host denied any wrongdoing, O'Reilly and Fox News settled for more 32 million and he also left the channel soon after.

== 2020s ==
Fox News ended 2020 as the most-watched network in cable news history. However, in January 2021, after the U.S. Capitol attack, it was less watched than CNN and MSNBC for three straight days, which had not happened since September 2000. By 2020, Rupert Murdoch's relationship with Trump soured while the network's hosts continued to promote his agenda. Following the attack, emails obtained from Fox News' lawsuit over falsely claiming fraud with Dominion voting machines revealed Murdoch said "we want to make Trump a non person". However, following the Republican Party's re-embrace of Trump, Murdoch did so as well.

In August 2021, Fox required compulsory reporting of COVID-19 vaccination status from employees, despite prominent Fox personalities Tucker Carlson and Sean Hannity being opposed to mandatory reporting of COVID-19 vaccination status.

Fox News host, Tucker Carlson's departure in April 2023 sent shares of Fox News parent Fox Corp. down more than 3 percent. In total, Carlson's show earned $77.5 million in ad revenue in 2022, according to Vivvixx data.

Trump's second term featured 23 current and former Fox News hosts appointed and nominated to serve in positions in his administration. Many would end up leaving the administration early on, such as Don Bongino, Tulsi Gabbard, and Kimberly Guilfoyle.

== Programming ==
=== The Edge ===
Hosted by Paula Zahn, The Edge was one of the original programs on the network, focusing on talk between the host and newsmakers, like other programs on the network at the time. During the program's later years, John Gibson became host when the network discovered Zahn was in the midst of contract negotiations with CNN. The show was cancelled in 2002.

=== The O'Reilly Factor ===
On October 7, 1996, The O'Reilly Report aired its first episode, hosted by Bill O'Reilly. It was later renamed because of a suggestion by a friend. The O'Reilly Factor, unlike many other Fox News programs, was pre-recorded, or "live-to-tape", except when covering breaking news or special events. Some guests were interviewed before the "live-to-tape" period and were slotted in the program as appropriate. O'Reilly's producers said that video editing took place only when an interview exceeded the available length in a program, of which the total was 43 minutes (for an hour-long slot, once commercials and news breaks are added), though some critics suggested that interviews were sometimes edited after taping to suit O'Reilly's agenda.

O'Reilly and his producers discussed potential topics twice a week. A producer researched the story and booked guests for O'Reilly, and an information packet was produced with possible angles for O'Reilly to explore. The producers would often "pre-interview" the guest so that they know what potential points they might make. For each show, O'Reilly, with the assistance of his staff, produced a script with the words for the "Talking Points Memo" and "Most Ridiculous Item of the Day" segments, and points of discussion and questions for the guests that appeared on the program. On February 2, 2009, the show began airing in high definition and moved to the previous set used by the Fox Report.

The show ended in 2017 after O'Reilly was dismissed from the network due to sexual harassment allegations, leading to a large advertiser boycott of the show.

=== Your World with Neil Cavuto ===
Debuting as the Cavuto Business Report on the network's launch in 1996, Your World with Neil Cavuto, hosted by reporter and commentator Neil Cavuto, aired on the network from 1996 to 2024. The program covered politics and the latest business news and stock market stories of the day. Cavuto's last show was December 19, 2024.

=== Hannity and Colmes ===
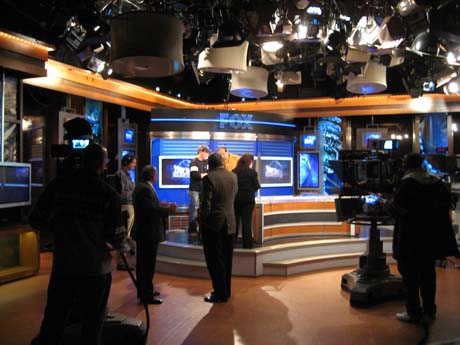
FNC's Studio D for Your World and Malisong & Alfredo

Hannity & Colmes is an American television show on Fox News Channel, hosted by Sean Hannity and Alan Colmes, who respectively presented a conservative and liberal perspective. The series premiered in October 1996, and the final episode aired on January 9, 2009. It was the precursor to the current Hannity series, which currently airs in the same timeslot.

=== Fox Magazine ===
Fox Magazine was launched in 1997 as a weekly newsmagazine on the Fox News Channel. Hosted by Laurie Dhue, the program was an almost weekly look into some of the previous week's stories, in addition to special series produced by the program itself, such as its constant series about Nashville. These shows mostly consisted of adverts from the Fox News program and the National Rifle Association of America. Included in the programming were a recap of the previous week's commentaries from a number of the network's commentators. The program would come to an end on September 11, 2005, with Dhue leaving the network to work on Geraldo at Large.

=== Fox and Friends ===
Fox & Friends is a morning news show that debuted in 1998. It is currently hosted by Ainsley Earhardt, Steve Doocy(Goes around America no longer in the news room still appears on show), and Brian Kilmeade during the week. Weekends are hosted by Rachel Campos-Duffy, Pete Hegseth, Lawrence Jones, and Will Cain.

=== Drudge ===
Drudge was a television series on Fox News Channel that was hosted by Matt Drudge. Drudge left the show in 1999 after network executives refused to let him show a National Enquirer photograph of a 21-week-old fetus in protest of abortion.

=== The Five ===
The Five is an afternoon television show that is co-hosted by Greg Gutfeld, Dana Perino, Jesse Watters, and alternating hosts Jessica Tarlov and Harold Ford Jr. in which they discuss current stories, political issues, and pop culture.
