= Eight Episodes =

- Short story by Robert Reed
- Cover of ebook edition
- Country: United States
- Language: English
- Genre(s): Science fiction short story

Publication
- Published in: Asimov's Science Fiction
- Publication type: Periodical
- Publisher: Dell Magazines
- Media type: Print (Magazine)
- Publication date: June 2006

"Eight Episodes" is a science fiction short story by Robert Reed. It was first published in the June 2006 issue of Asimov's Science Fiction.

== Synopsis ==
The story follows the lifespan of Invasion of a Small World, a near-future low budget web series (one created with virtual actors and sets using online software) about an Indian astronomer working in South Africa. When one of his graduate students discovers a tiny metal ball in an ancient rock, the world’s scientific community comes alive with excitement. Further episodes of the doomed series reveal information about Earth and the Solar System that is extremely accurate, and ignites speculation about alien life in the universe. There is even suggestion that the whole series itself was created by aliens in an attempt to explain the workings of the galaxy and civilizations to mankind.

== Reception ==
The Internet Review of Science Fiction's Lois Tilton reviewed Eight Episodes as "an odd, thought-provoking work, that raises more questions than answers. Sometimes, we never find the answers."

== Awards ==
Eight Episodes was nominated for the 2007 Hugo Award for Best Short Story and received ninth place in the Locus Award for the Best Short Story of 2007.
