= The Light Brigade (novel) =

2019 novel by Kameron Hurley

- Author: Kameron Hurley
- Genre: Science fiction, Time travel
- Publisher: Saga Press
- Publication date: March 19, 2019
- Publication place: United States

The Light Brigade is a 2019 science fiction novel by Kameron Hurley, in which brutal descriptions of war and economic exploitation in a dystopian future are used to provide strongly critical commentary on the nature of warfare and capitalism. It was nominated for both Hugo and Locus awards for 2020.

== Plot summary ==
In a dystopian and post-apocalyptic future, the world is ruled by six mega-corporations. Members of society are either corporate citizens bound to serve corporate goals, or "ghouls" who are dispossessed and lack status. The corporate private armies are at war with the separatists of Mars, who allegedly disappeared the entire population of São Paulo using unknown technology, in an offensive called "the Blink". Soldiers, better known as "grunts", are broken down into light and sent to distant battlefronts. Some of them come back different, but are punished if they try to talk about what they experienced, so everyone learns that it's better to remain silent.

Dietz is newly enlisted to the infantry of Tene-Silvia, one of the Big Six corporations fighting Mars. Dietz joined to get revenge, having lost home, friends, lover, and family in the Blink, but begins to experience combat drops that don't sync up with the rest of the platoon's. Dietz encounters events that seem out of sequence, lands in unfamiliar missions, and fights alongside grunts that know Dietz but whom Dietz has never met. Along the way, Dietz learns things that contradict what the corporate brass claims is real.

Dietz struggles to determine whether there is a real difference or if the perceptions is caused by combat madness. Parsing what is real, understanding when and where events occurred, and surviving the brutal, violent war become Dietz's main challenges.

== Reception ==
In a starred review, Kirkus Reviews posits that The Light Brigade is a "fascinating and brilliantly confusing journey that ultimately ends, as is appropriate, in illumination. Rereads will be both necessary and desirable." In its verdict, Library Journal concludes that The Light Brigade is an "absorbing and gritty story" by an "accomplished author". Booklist's starred review compares the novel to Philip K. Dick’s Now Wait for Last Year, and calls it "an enthralling portrait of a devastated near future" that is "highly recommended for not only SF fans but anyone interested in a thrilling and troubling vision of the future".

In its "PW Picks" starred review, Publishers Weekly calls The Light Brigade a "smart, brutal, and structurally sophisticated military science fiction tale with a time travel twist". The review compares the book to Joe Haldeman’s The Forever War as a "gripping story of future warfare and an incisive antiwar fable", while promising that readers will "savor this striking novel’s ambitious structure and critique of rapacious, militarized capitalism". Andrew Liptak, in The Verge, also compares The Light Brigade to a classic its review, this time to Robert Heinlein's Starship Troopers, calling it "a worthy successor" and "one of the rare ones that equals" the book that "struck the mold for military science fiction". Liptak calls Hurley's commentary on capitalism and war "scathing", noting the future described in which corporations "control all aspects of the lives of the citizens, from the information they have access to, to how they’re educated and where they live, their lives given up to supporting whatever unknowable corporate goals their overlords have planned".

== Awards ==
- Hugo Award for Best Novel Nominee (2020)
- Locus Award for Best Science Fiction Novel Nominee (2020)
- Arthur C. Clarke Award Nominee (2020)
- Premio Ignotus for Mejor Novela Extranjera (2020)
- Goodreads Choice Award Nominee for Science Fiction (2019)
- Dragon Award Nominee for Best Military Science Fiction or Fantasy Novel (2019)
