= Robert Reed (author) =

American science fiction author (born 1956)

- Born: Robert David Reed; October 9, 1956 (age 70); Omaha, Nebraska, U.S.
- Education: Nebraska Wesleyan University (BS)
- Occupation: Writer
- Writing career
- Period: 1986–present
- Genres: Science fiction, fantasy
- Website: www.robertreedwriter.com

Robert David Reed (born October 9, 1956, in Omaha, Nebraska) is a Hugo Award-winning American science fiction author. He has a Bachelor of Science in biology from the Nebraska Wesleyan University. Reed is an "extraordinarily prolific" genre short-fiction writer with "Alone" being his 200th professional sale. His work regularly appears in Asimov's, Fantasy & Science Fiction, and Sci Fiction. He has also published eleven novels. As of 2010, Reed lived in Lincoln, Nebraska with his wife and daughter.

== Awards ==
- "Mudpuppies" (1986) (First Writers of the Future Grand Prize winner)
- la Voie terrestre (1994), the French translation of Down the Bright Way (1991) (Grand Prix de l'Imaginaire for foreign novel)
- "Decency" (1996) (Asimov's Science Fiction reader poll, short story)
- "Marrow" (1997) (Science Fiction Age reader poll, novella)
- "She Sees My Monsters Now" (2002) (Asimov's Science Fiction reader poll, short story)
- "A Billion Eves" (2006): Hugo Award for Best Novella, 2007

He was nominated for the John W. Campbell Award for Best New Writer in Science Fiction in 1987.

== Bibliography ==
=== Marrow / Great Ship Series ===
1. Marrow (2000)
2. The Well of Stars (2004)
3. The Greatship (2013) (collection)
4. The Memory of Sky (2014)
5. The Dragons of Marrow (2018)
6. Hammerwing (2023)

=== Novels ===
- The Leeshore (1987)
- The Hormone Jungle (1987)
- Black milk (1989)
- Down the Bright Way (1991). Review by Jo Walton.
- The Remarkables (1992)
- Beyond the Veil of Stars (1994)
- An Exaltation of Larks (1995)
- Beneath the Gated Sky (1997)
- Sister Alice (2003)

=== Collections ===
- The Dragons of Springplace (1999)
- Chrysalide (2002) (French-language translations)
- The Cuckoo's Boys (2005)

=== Chapbooks ===
- Mere (2004) (Set in the world of the Great Ship/Marrow)
- Flavors of My Genius (2006)

=== Stories ===
1989	"Totipotent"
1990	"Chaff" [Lc1991 n]; "Bushwhacker"; "The Utility Man" [Hu1991 n] [Lc1991 n]
1991	"Pipes" [Lc1992 n]
1992	"After All"; "Birth Day"; "Burger Love"; "Coffins"
1993	"On the Brink of that Bright New World"; "Do I Know You?"; "Blind"; "Guest of Honor"; "The Toad of Heaven"; "Migration Patterns"; "Fable Blue"; "Sister Alice" [Ar1994 n] [Hu1994 x] [Lc1994 n]; "To Know Each Other All the Better"
1994	"The Remoras"; "The Shape of Everything"; "Stride" [Hu1995 x] [Lc1995 n]; "The Dimensions of the Deed"; "Waging Good" [Ar1996 n] [Hu1996 x] [Lc1996 n]
1995	"Dreams from a Severed Heart"; "We Are All Superheroes"; "A Place With Shade"; "At the 'Me' Shop"; "Our Prayers Are With You"; "Worthy"; "Brother Perfect"; "The Tournament"; "Aeon's Child"; "Mrs. Greasy"; "The Myrtle Man"; "Tongues" [Ar1996 n]
1996	"Killing the Morrow" [Hu1997 x]; "The Apollo Man"; "First Tuesday" [Lc1997 n]; "Little Miss Trashcan"; "Water Colors"; "Decency" [Ar1997] [Sc1997 n] [Hu1997 n] [Lc1997 x]; "334 Manchester Lane"; "Once Green"; "Chrysalis" [Ar1997 n] [Hu1997 x] [Lc1997 x] [Ne1997 x]
1997	"Blooming Ice" [Lc1998 n]; "The Dragons of Springplace" [Lc1998 n]; "Graffiti"; "Marrow" [Hu1998 n] [Lc1998 n]; "Goo Fish"; "Mind's Eye"; "To Church with Mr. Multhiford"
1998	"Mother Death" [Ar1999 x] [Lc1999 n]; "Savior" [Lc1999 n]; "The Cuckoo's Boys" [Lc1999 n]; "Whiptail" [Hu1999 n] [Lc1999 x] [Tp1998 x]; "Building the Building of the World" [Ar1999 n] [Hm1998 x]; "The New System"
1999	"Will Be"; "Mac and Me"; "The Challenger"; "Game of the Century" [Hu2000 x] [Lc2000 n]; "Human Bay" [Ar2000 n] [Lc2000 n] [Wf2000 x]; "Baby's Fire" [Ar2000 n] [Hu2000 x] [Lc2000 n]; "Winemaster" [Lc2000 x] [Su2000 x]; "Nodaway" [Hu2000 x] [Lc2000 n]; "What It Is"; "At the Corner of Darwin and Eternity" [Lc2000 x]; "Apothecary Blue"
2000	"Due"; "Frank" [Lc2001 x]; "Grandma's Jumpman" [Lc2001 x]; "The Prophet Ugly" [Lc2001 n]; "Two Sams"; "In the Valley of the Thunder Quail"; "When It Ends" [Ar2001 x]; "Birdy Girl" [Lc2001 x] (available online); "Father to the Man" [Ar2001 x]; "The Gulf" [Lc2001 n]
2001	"Mirror" [Hu2002 x] [Lc2002 n]; "Past Imperfect"; "Hero"; "Sparks"; "One Last Game" [Lc2002 x]; "The Boy" [Lc2002 n]; "Raven Dream" [Lc2002 x]
2002	"Oracles" [Ar2003 n]; "Coelacanths" [Su2003 x]; "The Children's Crusade" [Lc2003 n] (available online); "Trouble Is"; "She Sees My Monsters Now" [Ar2003] [Lc2003 n]; "Veritas" [Ar2003 x] [Lc2003 n]; "Melodies Played upon Cold, Dark Worlds" (available online); "The Majesty of Angels"; "The Sleeping Woman"; "Lying to Dogs" [Ar2003 n] [Lc2003 n]
2003	"Rejection"; "Buffalo Wolf"; "Aux sources du génie" ("The Wellsprings of Creation") Only published in French translation.; "555"; "Night of Time"; "Hexagons" (available online); "Like, Need, Deserve" (available online); "Like Minds"
2004	"River of the Queen"; "A Plague of Life"; "Wealth"; "How it Feels"; "Daily Reports"; "The Condor's Green-Eyed Child"; "Designing With Souls"; Mere; "Opal Ball"; "A Change of Mind"; "The Dragons of Summer Gulch" (available online)
2005	"From Above"; "Hidden Paradise" (available online); "Veterans of the War"; "Dallas: An Essay"; "The New Deity"; "Poet Snow"; "Camouflage"; "Think So?"; "Pure Vision"; "Finished"; "Abducted Souls"; "The Cure"; "Man for the Job" (available online)
2006	"Less Than Nothing"; "Good Mountain"; "Intolerance"Fifty Dinosaurs; "Starbuck"; "Rwanda"; "Show Me Yours"; "Misjudgement Day"; "A Billion Eves"; "Plausible"; "Pills Forever"
2007	"Eight Episodes" (available narrated online); "X-Country"; "Magic with Thirteen-Year-Old Boys"; "Roxie"
2008	"The Man With the Golden Balloon"; "Fifty Dinosaurs"; "Five Thrillers"; "The House Left Empty"; "Reunion"; "Weapons of Discretion"; "Character Flu"; "Blackbird"; "Old Man Waiting"; "Six Foot Easy"; "Truth"; "Floating Over Time"; "American Cheetah"; "Leave"; "Dewey Smith and the Meaning of All"; "A Woman's Best Friend"
2010	"Alone" (65 pgs.; a "Great Ship" work); "A History of Terraforming"

Title	Year	First published	Reprinted/collected	Notes
The armistice	1986	Reed, Robert (1986). "The armistice". In Pournelle, Jerry & Jim Baen (eds.). Far frontiers VII. Baen.		
The bird looking in	1988			
Mudpuppies	1986			
Treading in the afterglow	1986			
Aeries	1987			
Goodness	1988			
Oort Cloud	1989			
Busybody	1990			
Treasure buried	1994	Reed, Robert (February 1994). "Treasure buried". F&SF. 86 (2).		Novelette
Hybrid	2000	Reed, Robert (Jul 2000). "Hybrid". F&SF. 99 (1): 110–128.		Novelette
Crooked Creek	2001	Reed, Robert (Jan 2001). "Crooked Creek". F&SF. 100 (1): 42–58.		
Market Day	2001	Reed, Robert (March 2001). "Market Day". F&SF. 100 (3): 89–103.		
Season to taste	2001	Reed, Robert (April 2001). "Season to taste". F&SF. 100 (4): 104–111.		
Salad for two	2008	Reed, Robert (Sep 2008). "Salad for two". F&SF. 115 (3): 137–152.		
The visionaries	2008	Reed, Robert (October–November 2008). "The visionaries". F&SF. 115 (4&5): 126–148.		Novelette
Firehorn	2009	Reed, Robert (June–July 2009). "Firehorn". F&SF. 116 (6&7): 6–32.		Novelette
Mantis	2010	Reed, Robert (2010). "Mantis". In Strahan, Jonathan (ed.). Engineering infinity. Solaris.		
The long retreat	2010	Reed, Robert (January–February 2010). "The long retreat". F&SF. 118 (1&2): 5–27.		
The ants of Flanders : a tale of five adventures	2011	Reed, Robert (July–August 2011). "The ants of Flanders : a tale of five adventures". F&SF. 121 (1&2): 84–135.		Novella
Swingers	2011			
Noumenon	2012	Reed, Robert (Sep 2012). "Noumenon". Asimov's Science Fiction. 36 (9): 56–69.		
The pipes of Pan	2012	Reed, Robert (December 2012). "The pipes of Pan". Asimov's Science Fiction. 36 (12): 66–73.		
The Golden Age of Story	2013	Reed, Robert (February 2013). "The Golden Age of Story". Asimov's Science Fiction. 37 (2): 56–67.		
Precious mental	2013	Reed, Robert (Jun 2013). "Precious mental". Asimov's Science Fiction. 37 (6): 62–106.		Novella
The principles	2014	Reed, Robert (April–May 2014). "The principles". Asimov's Science Fiction. 38 (4&5): 142–185.		Novella
Blood wedding	2014	Reed, Robert (July 2014). "Blood wedding". Asimov's Science Fiction. 38 (7): 10–28.		Novelette
The Cryptic Age	2014	Reed, Robert (December 2014). "The Cryptic Age". Asimov's Science Fiction. 38 (12): 10–24.		Novelette; The Great Ship
What I intend	2015	Reed, Robert (April–May 2015). "What I intend". Asimov's Science Fiction. 39 (4–5): 83–95.		

=== Nonfiction ===
- "Read This" in The New York Review of Science Fiction, July 1992.
- "Improbable Journeys" (2004), the afterword to Mere, which detailed the development of the stories set in the Marrow universe.
- "Afterword" to The Cuckoo's Boys, a short fiction collection.
