= The Well of Stars =

2004 novel by Robert Reed

The Well of Stars is a science fiction novel written by Robert Reed. It was published in 2004 (ISBN 0765308606) and is the sequel to Marrow, published in 2000.

== Synopsis ==
The Well of Stars features the same universe and the same characters as the earlier novel Marrow. In The Well of Stars, the ship is entering a dark nebula, dubbed the Ink Well, which turns out to be inhabited by an intelligent and hostile entity which calls itself "polyponds". The ship fights for its existence, while at the same time it is suggested that the enemies of the ship's creators are in pursuit.

== Translations ==
- French: "Un puits dans les étoiles" Bragelonne, 2007
- Chinese: 星井, 四川科学技术出版社, 2024, ISBN 9787572713002
