= We Have Always Fought =

"'We Have Always Fought': Challenging the 'Women, Cattle and Slaves' Narrative"
- Short story by Kameron Hurley
- Country: United States
- Language: English
- Genre: Essay

Publication
- Published in: A Dribble of Ink
- Publication type: Fanzine
- Publisher: Aidan Moher
- Media type: Online
- Publication date: May 20, 2013

"'We Have Always Fought': Challenging the 'Women, Cattle and Slaves' Narrative" is an essay by science fiction writer Kameron Hurley, addressing the portrayal of women in science fiction, and in general. It was first published as a post to A Dribble of Ink in May 2013, and was republished in Lightspeed's special issue "Women Destroy Science Fiction".

In 2014, it won the Hugo Award for Best Related Work, the same year that Hurley won Hugo for Best Fan Writer.
