= Beneath the Gated Sky =

1997 book by Robert Reed

- Author: Robert Reed
- Language: English
- Genre: Science fiction novel
- Publication date: 1997
- Publication place: United States
- Preceded by: Beyond the Veil of Stars

Beneath the Gated Sky is a science-fiction novel by Robert Reed, first published in 1997. It describes a world in which the sky undergoes a transformation that prevents people from seeing the stars, giving them instead a view of the other side of the world, as if the Earth had been turned inside out. The entire universe seems to have been rebuilt by an intelligence so that each body of matter exists in a structure that connects all matter together allowing travel between worlds using "quantum intrusions". The intrusions only allow minds, or as some would maintain, souls to pass through, emerging on the other side as a fully formed member of whatever species exists on the new world.

The novel is a sequel to Beyond the Veil of Stars, and follows that novel's protagonists, Cornell Novak and Porsche Neal, as they deal with their new relationship, the secret activities of the government agency that they worked for, and the possibility that some visitors from other worlds are working to destroy human society so they can take over.

== Plot summary ==
Cornell Novak and Porsche Neal have moved to an isolated property that happens to contain one of the many black glass disks that appeared all over the world shortly before the sky changed. The disks mark the sites of quantum intrusions, or gateways, that have been locked down by travelers from other worlds to prevent humans from opening them. Porsche herself is a traveler, as are her extended family. Cornell was born on Earth, but suspects that his ancestors were travelers.

Their initial purpose is to gather information and prepare to expose their former employer, the Cosmic Event Agency, to the world via the Internet, while having an escape route ready should the CEA attempt to capture them. However Cornell has to come to terms with Porsche's past, and the emotional relationships she formed with beings on other worlds. Porsche herself has a guilty secret. It was because of her rash revelation of her family's origins to her lover that they had to leave their previous home on the planet Jarrtree and come to Earth. The first part of the novel describes Porsche's childhood on Jarrtree and her arrival on Earth. Her extended family is part of "The Few", who have become part of societies across the universe.

On Earth, Porsche and Cornell have been working with a computer expert to create their presentation to the world. Porsche, working with her cousin Trinidad and advanced technology created by the Few, has set up a network of hidden alarms and booby trap devices around the farm. Suddenly they find themselves under attack by the CEA, who seem to be aiming to kidnap them. For some reason their defenses have failed. Porsche escapes with Cornell's father through the portal into a world of intelligent apes who live in a jungle environment. Another portal from there brings them back to Tasmania from where they travel to Australia, only to find that Trinidad is working with the CEA. Their objective was to kidnap Porsche and return her to Jarrtree. Her former lover there, Jey-im, is now in a position to help the CEA kidnap the best minds of Porsche's home city. He has been manipulated over a long period by Trinidad, impersonating Porsche over the data network. Now Porsche must appear in person to complete the deception. The CEA holds her relatives and their children as hostages.

The scheme appears to work and the CEA flee with their victims from the city. They come under fire from the local militia but threaten to kill the abductees unless allowed to escape. Trinidad's father, using resources still hidden on Jarrtree, intervenes and lures the entire CEA convoy into a portal which results in all their hardware being destroyed. They are forced to come to terms with the Few.

It begins to become clear that some travelers are not content to live in the societies they inhabit, but work to disrupt them so they can take over. Jarrtree itself is in turmoil thanks to a new religion. Porsche suspects members of her own extended family of being part of this group that they call "The Others".

Forced to choose sides, Porsche offers a deal to the CEA: her people can provide technology that would allow humans to colonize the Solar System at minimal cost using the gateways. In exchange the government would have to shut down its plans to get technology from other worlds and turn over any members of the Others who have been helping it.

The cost of this deal is the apparent death of Porsche's favorite cousin, Trinidad, who throws himself out of an airborne helicopter. Subsequently Trinidad's mother disappears, as does Porsche's sister-in-law, and many other spouses who married into the Few and were believed to be natives of the worlds they came from. All their children disappear with them. Porsche is left in shock, realizing how extensive the reach of the "Others" was. However Trinidad had cast doubt on who the real villains really might be.

== Sequels ==
The novel appeared to leave room for a sequel, but apart from a novelette entitled Apothecary Blue, printed in 1999 in Science Fiction Age, no other related work has been published.
