= Graham Sleight =

British writer, editor and critic

- Born: 1972 (age 53–54); England
- Occupations: Writer and editor

Graham Sleight (born 1972) is a British writer, editor and critic, who specialise in healthcare and science fiction. He is Head of Governance and Contracts at the Royal College of Paediatrics and Child Health, as well as the editor of the science fiction peer-reviewed literary magazine, Foundation. His criticism has appeared in Strange Horizons, The New York Review Of Science Fiction, and Vector. He also writes a column for Locus. Several volumes in the Gollancz SF Masterworks series contain introductions written by Sleight. Between 2005 and 2006, he was a judge of the Arthur C. Clarke Award. Additionally, he is the Managing Editor of the third edition of The Encyclopedia of Science Fiction (SFE3).

The 2012 Hugo Award for Best Related Work was given to the SFE3. Sleight accepted the award from emcee John Scalzi on behalf of the editors, saying, "We set out to build this really for the whole of the SF community... for any and all who are hungry for information about science fiction."

Sleight frequently writes about Doctor Who. He co-edited The Unsilent Library, a collection of essays about the Russell T Davies era of the show, and provided commentary on the 2011 BBC DVD release of "The Ark." His book The Doctor's Monsters: Meanings of the Monstrous in Doctor Who was published in 2012 by I.B. Tauris.
