= Beyond the Veil of Stars =

1994 novel by Robert Reed

- Author: Robert Reed
- Language: English
- Genre: Science fiction novel
- Publication date: 1994
- Publication place: United States
- Followed by: Beneath the Gated Sky

Beyond the Veil of Stars is a science-fiction novel by Robert Reed, first published in 1994. It describes a world in which the sky undergoes a transformation that prevents people from seeing the stars, giving them instead a view of the other side of the world, as if the Earth had been turned inside out. Accompanying this transformation are increased reports of UFO activity and the appearance of large circles of black glass at thousands of locations across the planet. Once the panic dies down, people resume their normal lives. Meanwhile, a shadowy government agency begins experiments using "quantum intrusions" to travel to other worlds.

== Plot summary ==
Cornell Novak grows up with his father, a UFO investigator, who travels frequently to investigate reports of lights in the sky, alien abductions, and the continuing appearances of circles of black glass at random locations, including Central Park in New York City. Cornell's mother disappeared when he was four, an event that his father says was alien abduction. They live in a slightly seedy suburban cul-de-sac with fortunately tolerant neighbors, who turn a blind eye to Cornell's father's unwillingness to carry out the usual suburban chores.

One night when Cornell is about 11 years old, he is out looking at the night sky when the stars disappear and are replaced by a view of the daylight side of the Earth. It quickly becomes apparent that the entire planet has a similar view. Politicians and scientists rush to control the situation, assuring people that the effect is some kind of illusion, since spacecraft in orbit are unaffected and can still see the stars and planets normally.

However, one Russian mathematician proposes an alternative theory. According to this, the entire universe was restructured by other intelligences long ago. The infinite universe that was previously visible is only one way of looking at spacetime. Other ways exist that see the universe as a connected set of structures that enclose each planet. At some point, the observation of the sky by the inhabitants of each planet causes the view of infinity to "evert", replacing one view of the universe with another equally valid one.

Cornell grows up to become a drifter of sorts. He moves from job to job, city to city. His father becomes moderately famous for a while during the period after the sky eversion. Cornell signs up for a pharmaceutical testing program to earn some money, but quickly realizes it is a cover for something else. He is recruited by the "CEA" or Cosmic Event Agency to travel to other worlds through "quantum intrusions". These act like portals with one special property. Anybody passing through to the other side is transformed into a copy of the closest matching species on the other side. No artifacts of any kind can be carried through. In effect, only the mind travels to the other world and back.

Cornell befriends a woman called Porsche Neal, a former professional basketball player. She is part of an expedition to a world referred to as "High Desert". In that world, the major intelligent species appears to consist of individuals with seven separate bodies: six mobile bipeds with limbs and a single limbless sphere containing the brain that controls the other bodies telepathically. The bipeds drag the brain around using its long hair. Humans have to learn to deal with senses that give them six different views of the world simultaneously. Some go mad in the process.

In High Desert, no actual members of the native species have been encountered. The team from Earth is kept busy constructing buildings using Stone Age technology, since there are no metals for them to use. They are also trying to construct bridges across the canyons that confine them to a high plateau, moving towards a place where their telepathic senses tell them there is some kind alien habitation. The work is dangerous and occasionally claims the life of one or more of an individual's selves, and sometimes even the brain.

Porsche and Cornell become close and fall in love. At the same time, Logan, the expedition leader, is becoming erratic. Eventually he falls under the influence of the telepathic presence they all feel. It consists of a giant brain that controls thousands of bodies in a city in the lowlands. All the expedition are transported to the city where the brain intends to absorb them. However, Porsche is able to communicate with the brain and persuade it to let a few of them return to prevent others coming to the world. They are allowed just enough bodies to drag their brains back to the portal, many kilometers away.

At this point Cornell confesses his suspicions to Porsche. She is not just another explorer from Earth, but originally came from another planet altogether using a portal. Porsche admits that this is true. Her people wander from world to world gaining knowledge of different cultures. She joined the project to locate others with the talent to use the portals. The glass disks represent portals to safe worlds, but they can only be opened by equipment that her people know how to make. The portals used by the CEA are not safe but can be opened by the brute force of the equipment that the CEA has made. The CEA has been growing rich and influential by exploiting technological knowledge found on other worlds but is becoming aware that others like Porsche know how to use the portals. The knowledge of the portals is being kept secret, which makes it dangerous for Porsche's people to reveal themselves.

Porsche and Cornell manage to get themselves discharged from the project after the High Desert debacle. The casualties are covered up by staging a plane crash at sea. Cornell seeks out his father, from whom he has been estranged since he discovered that his mother simply left and had not been abducted as his father claimed. His father is living on some land he bought that has one of the glass disks on it. Cornell tries to tell him about the intrusions but finds he has been conditioned to be unable to do this. However, Porsche can reveal the truth about the glass disk. Placing a few innocent-looking tools on the disk activates it. Standing on the center Cornell can look up and see all the other disks as points of light across the world.

== Sequel ==
This novel is followed by Beneath the Gated Sky, in which Porsche and Cornell have to deal with the CEA and other alien visitors who do not simply explore other worlds, but try to disrupt their societies so they can take over.
