= Daniel M. Kimmel =

American film critic and author (born 1955)

- Born: 1955 (age 70–71); United States
- Education: University of Rochester; Boston University
- Occupations: Film critic, writer
- Years active: 1984–present

Daniel M. Kimmel (born 1955) is an American film critic and author.

In September 2014, he became editor of The Jewish Advocate where he served through December 2015. He received a B.A. from the University of Rochester and a degree in law from Boston University.

Kimmel was the Boston correspondent for Variety from 1986 to 2013, and has been a TV columnist for The Boston Herald. From 1984 to 2009, he was a film reviewer for the Telegram & Gazette in Worcester, Massachusetts. His reviews can be found at NorthShoreMovies.net and the Sci-Fi Movie Page. Until his promotion he was the "Movie Maven" for The Jewish Advocate. His essays on classic science fiction films were being published in The Internet Review of Science Fiction from 2005–2010 and are now in Space and Time magazine.

He is a past president and current member of the Boston Society of Film Critics. In May 2012, he became founding co-chair of the Boston Online Film Critics Association.

Kimmel is the author of several books and has co-written a play The Waldorf Conference about the Hollywood blacklist. His 2004 history of Fox, The Fourth Network, received the Cable Center Award for best book of the year. His collection of essays titled Jar Jar Binks Must Die was nominated for a Hugo Award in the category "Best Related Work". His novel Shh! It's a Secret was on the shortlist for the Compton Crook Award given to best first novel by the Baltimore Science Fiction Society. His latest is A Talent to Amuse. He is the 2018 recipient of the Skylark Award given by the New England Science Fiction Association.

== Books ==
- The Fourth Network: How FOX Broke the Rules and Reinvented Television
- Love Stories: Hollywood's Most Romantic Movies
- Isn't It Romantic
- The Dream Team – The Rise and Fall of DreamWorks: Lessons from the New Hollywood
- I'll Have What She's Having: Behind the Scenes of the Great Romantic Comedies
- Jar Jar Binks Must Die ... And Other Observations About Science Fiction Films
- Shh! It's a Secret – A Novel About Aliens, Hollywood, and the Bartender's Guide
- Time on My Hands: My Misadventures in Time Travel
- Father of the Bride of Frankenstein
- Banned in Boston (co-author with Deborah Hand-Cutler)
- Can Your Heart Stand the Shocking Facts?
- A Talent to Amuse
