= Sister Alice =

2003 novel by Robert Reed

- First edition cover
- Author: Robert Reed
- Genre: Science fiction
- Publisher: Tor Books
- Publication date: December 1, 2003
- ISBN: 0-765-30225-X

Sister Alice is a 2003 science fiction novel by American writer Robert Reed. It was a finalist for the 2004 John W. Campbell Memorial Award.

The five sections of the novel originally appeared in a different form in the magazine Asimov's Science Fiction:

- "Sister Alice" (November 1993)
- "Brother Perfect" (September 1995)
- "Mother Death" (January 1998)
- "Baby's Fire" (July 1999)
- "Father to the Man" (September 2000)

== Story ==
The story is about a child growing up in a cold planet Earth around 10 million years from now. He travels from being a young boy playing war with his friends to a semi-god still playing war, but with a universe at stake.

Godlike powers were withdrawn from most humans after a catastrophic war between 'human gods' almost destroyed humanity itself. A small subset of selected families were permitted to retain these powers in the service of humanity. Each family was born from a small number of individuals, chosen after competitive selection and extensive and exhaustive vetting. Each family had psychological tendencies that predisposed its work for humanity to follow certain directions. The tensions between families erupt when the drive to 'improve' unleashes forces which threaten death and destruction on a galactic scale. Born of one of these god like families, one boy is forced into the role of saviour or destroyer, hunted and vilified, he must save himself, his family, and the galaxy.
