= The Company They Keep =

2007 book by Diana Pavlac Glyer

The Company They Keep: C. S. Lewis and J. R. R. Tolkien as Writers in Community
- Cover of the first edition
- Author: Diana Pavlac Glyer
- Language: English
- Subject: J.R.R. Tolkien, C.S. Lewis, Charles Williams, Inklings
- Genre: Non-fiction; Literary history
- Publisher: Kent State University Press
- Publication date: March 1, 2007
- Pages: 293 (hardcover)
- ISBN: 978-0-87338-890-0
- OCLC: 70265586
- Dewey Decimal: 823/.912 B 22
- LC Class: PR6023.E926 Z6642 2007

The Company They Keep: C. S. Lewis and J. R. R. Tolkien as Writers in Community (2007) is a non-fiction book written by Diana Pavlac Glyer, an Inklings scholar and English professor at Azusa Pacific University. The Company They Keep challenges the commonly held belief that the Inklings did not influence each other through a detailed and engaging examination of both published and unpublished works, papers, and letters written by J.R.R. Tolkien, C.S. Lewis, Charles Williams, Owen Barfield, Warren Lewis and the lesser-known writers who comprised the Inklings.

Dr. Glyer provides the historical context for C.S. Lewis' famous statement that one doesn't influence Tolkien, one "might as well try to influence a bandersnatch!" and examines the ways the Inklings both inspired and provoked each other into writing better, more distinctly individual works than they would have without the group.

== Awards ==
The Company They Keep: C. S. Lewis and J. R. R. Tolkien as Writers in Community is the winner of the 2008 Mythopoeic Scholarship Award in Inklings Studies; and the NETS 2006/2007 Imperishable Flame Award. It was also nominated for the Hugo Award for Best Related Book at Denvention 3, the 66th World Science Fiction Convention, held in Denver, Colorado.
