= Marrow (novel) =

2000 novel by Robert Reed

- Author: Robert Reed
- Language: English
- Genre: Science fiction novel
- Publisher: Tor Books
- Publication date: 2000
- Publication place: United States
- Media type: Print (hardback & paperback)
- Pages: 351 pp
- ISBN: 0-312-86801-4
- OCLC: 43615783
- Dewey Decimal: 813/.54 21
- LC Class: PS3568.E3696 M37 2000
- Followed by: The Well of Stars

Marrow is a science fiction novel by American writer Robert Reed published in 2000.

== Plot ==
When a jovian-sized, artificially-created structure enters the galaxy, a society of technologically advanced humans (capable of interstellar flight and functionally immortal) are the first to intercept and investigate it. Finding it to be an intergalactic ship, they decide to convert it into a cruise ship, inviting alien races to join them in its massive, uncharted interior as it makes a slow circumnavigation of the Milky Way.

After thousands of years, with over 200 billion creatures living in its upper levels, a group of explorers discover a planet hidden in the core of the Great Ship. As they explore it, however, an ionic blast cuts them off from the rest of the ship and destroys much of their technology. Because this planet, Marrow, is slowly expanding, the explorers reason that a new bridge can be built in another 5,000 years. They thus begin a civilization on the surface of Marrow.

The descendants of these original explorers come to believe that the large superstructure has been built to contain the Bleak, a race of nearly unstoppable insect-like creatures. Calling themselves the Wayward, they take over the ship when the bridge is completed and attempt to steer it towards a black hole to destroy the Bleak.

One of the original explorers sees a vision of the Builders of the ship fighting the Bleak, containing them within the heart of Marrow and constructing the ship around it as a prison. The Bleak, it is concluded, have twisted the Wayward into destroying the ship so that they may escape. They stop the Wayward's plan by undermining the ship's control and command systems to divert the engines' thrust just enough to skim past the black hole.

The book ends with the suggestion that, with Marrow being a prison for the Bleak and the Great Ship an extension of that prison, the universe itself could be a further layer constructed by the Builders.

== Reviews and criticism ==
While many readers had generally positive reactions to the novel, numerous criticisms were drawn. Some reviewers argue that the novel, while grand in premise, ends up muddled. Many note that Robert Reed visited on the Marrow planet/ship concept in three of his earlier works, "The Remoras", "Aeon's Child", and a short story also named "Marrow". Claude Lalumière viewed Marrow as essentially a world-building exercise unnaturally constrained into the novel form and would rather have seen a collection of short stories flesh out the world he'd created. Peter Tillman felt the novel had too many scientific errors to be true sci-fi and would be better classified as sci-fantasy. Nevertheless, most reviewers agreed the book is entertaining and novel in its scope and premise. Reed himself defends his non-strict approach to science in his sci-fi writings, and seems to have intentionally left much of his work in the realm of fantasy.

== Sequels ==
The sequel to Marrow is The Well of Stars (2004).

== Translations ==
- French: "Le Grand vaisseau" ("The Great Ship"), Bragelonne, 2006, ISBN 2-9155496-8-0
- Russian: "Жизненная сила" ("The Vital Force"), AST, 2003, ISBN 5-17-016662-1.
- Spanish: Médula ("Marrow"), La Factoría de Ideas, 2007, ISBN 84-9800-254-0
- Chinese: 星髓 ("Star Marrow"), 四川科学技术出版社, 2019, ISBN 9787536489806
