= Kameron Hurley =

American science-fiction writer

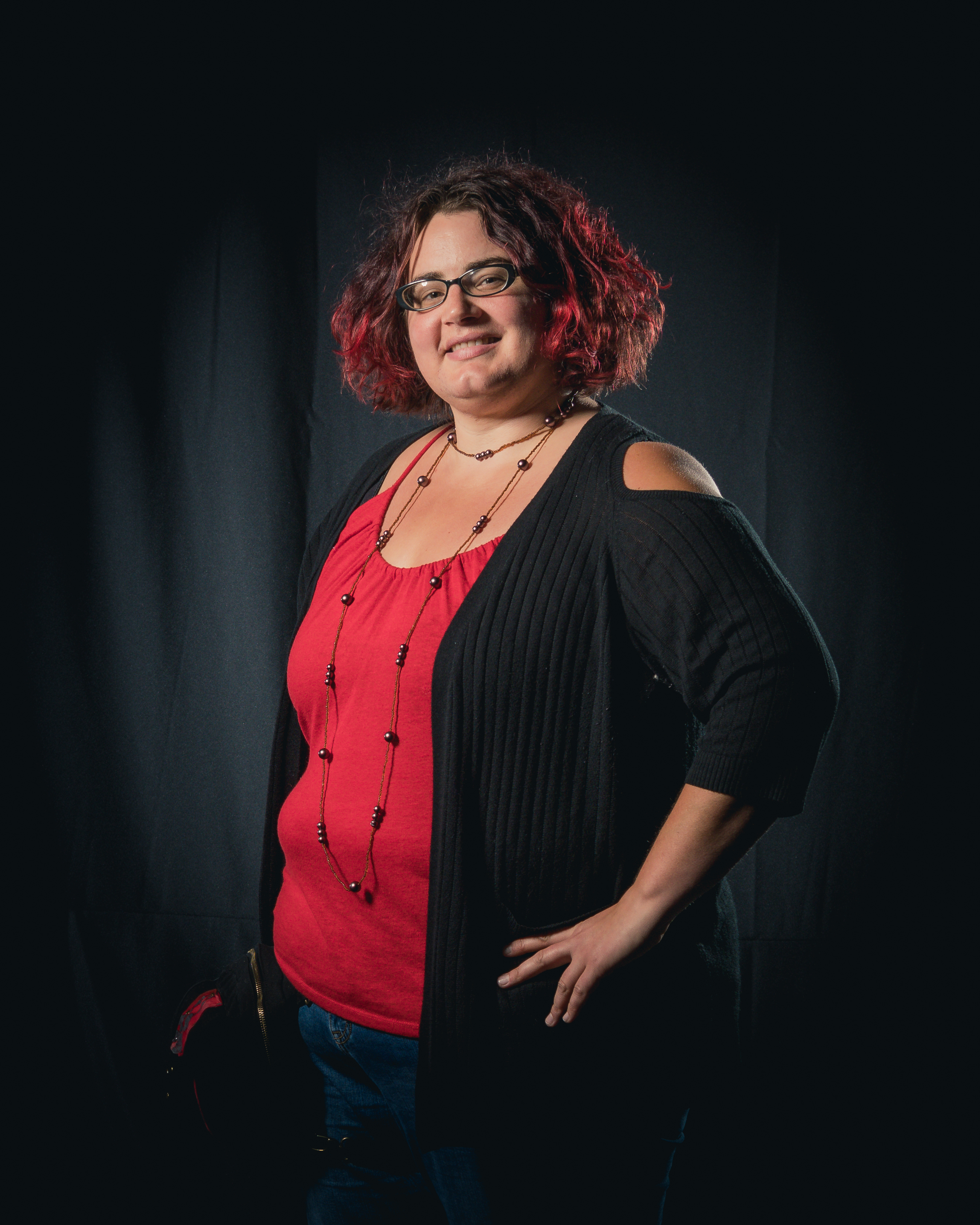
- Kameron Hurley, at Worldcon in Helsinki in 2017.
- Born: Washington state, United States
- Occupation: Author
- Writing career
- Genres: Science fiction, fantasy
- Notable awards: Sydney J. Bounds Award (2011) Best Newcomer; Kitschies (2011) Best Debut Novel; Hugo Award (2014) Best Related Work; Hugo Award (2014) Best Fan Writer
- Website: kameronhurley.com

Kameron Hurley is an American science fiction and fantasy writer.

== Biography ==
Hurley was born in Washington state and has lived in Fairbanks, Alaska, Durban, South Africa, and Chicago. She currently resides in Dayton, Ohio.

Hurley has been publishing short fiction since 1998 and novels since 2011. From 2013 to 2021 Hurley wrote regular columns for Locus magazine about the craft and business of fiction writing and has published non-fiction pieces in The Atlantic, Boing Boing, Entertainment Weekly, Bitch, Tor.com, Uncanny Magazine, HuffPost, The Mary Sue, Female First, Writer's Digest, and LA Weekly. Hurley is a graduate of Clarion West.

Her first novel trilogy, the Bel Dame Apocrypha, is what Hurley called "bugpunk": set on a far-future desert planet whose technology is based on insects and whose matriarchal, Islam-inspired cultures are locked in perpetual war. Her second trilogy, the Worldbreaker Saga, is grimdark epic fantasy that aims to subvert the genre's tropes such as the hero's journey. She has also published a standalone space opera novel, The Stars are Legion, in 2017, and the military science fiction time travel novel, The Light Brigade, in 2019.

Her first nonfiction book, the essay collection The Geek Feminist Revolution, was published in 2016.

== Awards and nominations ==
Awards for Kameron Hurley
Year	Work	Award	Category	Result	Ref.
2011	"Afterbirth"	BSFA Award	Best Short Fiction	Nominated	
2011	God's War	Otherwise Award	Honor List	Nominated	
2011	God's War	Kitschies	Golden Tentacle (Best Debut Novel)	Won	
2011	God's War	Nebula Award	Best Novel	Nominated	
2012	God's War	British Fantasy Award	The Sydney J. Bounds Award for Best Newcomer	Won	
2012	God's War	Locus Award	Best First Novel	Nominated	
2013	God's War	BSFA Award	Best Novel	Nominated	
2014	God's War	Arthur C. Clarke Award	Best Science Fiction Novel	Nominated	
2014	N/A	Hugo Award	Best Fan Writer	Won	
2014	"We Have Always Fought: Challenging the Women, Cattle and Slaves Narrative"	Hugo Award	Best Related Work	Won	
2014	"We Have Always Fought: Challenging the Women, Cattle and Slaves Narrative"	British Fantasy Award	Best Non-Fiction	Nominated	
2015	The Mirror Empire	Locus Award	Best Fantasy Novel	Nominated	
2015	The Mirror Empire	Gemmell Award	Morningstar Award	Nominated	
2017	The Geek Feminist Revolution	Locus Award	Best Non-Fiction	Won	
2017	The Geek Feminist Revolution	British Fantasy Award	Best Non-Fiction	Won	
2017	The Geek Feminist Revolution	Hugo Award	Best Related Work	Nominated	
2018	The Stars Are Legion	Locus Award	Best Science Fiction Novel	Nominated	
2018	The Stars Are Legion	Campbell Memorial Award	Best Science Fiction Novel	Nominated	
2018	Las estrellas son legión (The Stars Are Legion)	Premio Ignotus	Best Foreign Novel	Won	
2019	Meet Me in the Future	Otherwise Award	Honor List	Nominated	
2020	Meet Me in the Future	Locus Award	Best Collection	Nominated	
2019	The Light Brigade	Dragon Award	Best Military Science Fiction or Fantasy Novel	Nominated	
2020	The Light Brigade	Hugo Award	Best Novel	Nominated	
2020	The Light Brigade	Locus Award	Best Science Fiction Novel	Nominated	
2020	The Light Brigade	Arthur C. Clarke Award	Best Science Fiction Novel	Nominated	
2020	La brigada de luz (The Light Brigade)	Premio Ignotus	Best Foreign Novel	Won	

David Palumbo's cover art for Hurley's novel God's War (part of the Bel Dame Apocrypha series) was nominated for the Chesley Award for Best Cover Illustration – Paperback and won Gold in the 2011 Spectrum Award – Books.

== Bibliography ==
=== Novels ===
- The Stars Are Legion, Saga Press, 2017
- The Light Brigade, Saga Press, 2019

==== The Bel Dame Apocrypha ====
1. God's War, Night Shade Books, 2011
2. Infidel, Night Shade Books, 2011
3. Rapture, Night Shade Books, 2012

==== Worldbreaker Saga ====
1. The Mirror Empire, Angry Robot, 2014
2. Empire Ascendant, Angry Robot, 2015
3. The Broken Heavens, Angry Robot, 2020

=== Short fiction ===
==== Collections ====
- Brutal Women: Short Stories, 2010
- Apocalypse Nyx, Tachyon Publications, 2018 (The Bel Dame Apocrypha)
- Meet Me in the Future: Stories, Tachyon Publications, 2019
- Future Artifacts, Apex Books, 2022

==== Stories ====
Title	Year	First published	Reprinted/collected	Notes
"Brutal women"	1998	The Boundless Realm		Online journal
"If Women Do Fall They Lie"	2001	Deep Outside SFFH		
"Holding Onto Ghosts"	2003	Talebones, issue No. 26, Fairwood Press		
"Once, There Were Wolves"	2003	Leading Edge, April 2003, Brigham Young University		
"Genderbending at the Madhattered"	2004	Strange Horizons, issue 23 Feb 2004		
"The Women of Our Occupation"	2006	Strange Horizons, issue 31 July 2006	Year's Best SF 12 ed. David G. Hartwell and Kathryn Cramer, Harper Voyager, 2007; Nova science fiction, nummer 17 ed. John-Henri Holmberg, Gafiac, 2008; Sci-Fi Magazin, martie 2008 ed. George Lazăr and Cătălin Moraru, Mediapress, Botoșani, 2008; Escape Pod, ep. 462 ed. Norm Sherman, Escape Artists, Inc., 2014; Meet Me in the Future by Kameron Hurley, Tachyon Publications, 2019; Meet Me in the Future by Kameron Hurley, Highbridge Audio, 2019; Escape Pod No. 740 ed. Divya Breed and Mur Lafferty, Escape Artists, Inc., 2020	
"Wonder Maul Doll"	2007	From the Trenches: An Anthology of Speculative War Stories ed. Joseph Paul Haines and Samantha Henderson, Carnifex Press, 2007	Escape Pod, ep. 207 ed. Steve Eley, Escape Artists, Inc., 2009; Warrior Women ed. Paula Guran, Prime Books, 2015; Future Artifacts by Kameron Hurley, Apex Publications, 2022; Future Artifacts by Kameron Hurley, Recorded Books, 2022	
"Afterbirth"	2011	Self-published on Kameron Hurley's website	BSFA Awards 2011, BSFA Awards Annual Collections, 2012; "Afterbirth", Kameron Hurley, 2014	Bel Dame Apocrypha
"Enyo-Enyo"	2013	The Lowest Heaven ed. Anne C. Perry and Jared Shurin, Jurassic London, 2013	Lightspeed, issue 41 ed. John Joseph Adams, Lightspeed Magazine, 2013; The Mammoth Book of SF Stories by Women ed. Alex Dally MacFarlane, Running Press, 2014; StarShipSofa, No. 490, ed. Tony C. Smith, District of Wonders, 2017; Meet Me in the Future by Kameron Hurley, Tachyon Publications, 2019; Meet Me in the Future by Kameron Hurley, Highbridge Audio, 2019	
The Body Project	2014	The Body Project, Kameron Hurley, 2014	Apocalypse Nyx by Kameron Hurley, Tachyon Publications, 2018; Apocalypse Nyx by Kameron Hurley, Recorded Books and Blackstone Publishing, 2018	Bel Dame Apocrypha
"The Seams Between the Stars"	2014	"The Seams Between the Stars", Kameron Hurley, 2014		Bel Dame Apocrypha
"It's About Ethics in Revolution"	2015	Terraform, 4 May 2015, ed. Claire L. Evans and Brian Merchant, Vice, 2015		
"The Corpse Archives"	2015	"The Corpse Archives", Kameron Hurley, 2015	Meet Me in the Future by Kameron Hurley, Tachyon Publications, 2019; Meet Me in the Future by Kameron Hurley, Highbridge Audio, 2019	Bel Dame Apocrypha
"Elephants and Corpses"	2015	Tor.com, May 13, 2015 ed. Carl Engle-Laird, Tor Books, 2015	"Elephants and Corpses": A Tor.com Original, Tor Books, 2015; Some of the Best from Tor.com: 2015 Edition, ed. Ellen Datlow, Claire Eddy, Carl Engle-Laird, David G. Hartwell, Beth Meacham, Patrick Nielsen Hayden, Marco Palmieri, and Ann VanderMeer, Tor Books, 2016; Worlds Seen in Passing: Ten Years of Tor.com Short Fiction, ed. Irene Gallo, Tor.com, 2018; Meet Me in the Future by Kameron Hurley, Tachyon Publications, 2019; Meet Me in the Future by Kameron Hurley, Highbridge Audio, 2019	
"The Plague Givers"	2015	Uncanny Magazine, issue 10, ed. Lynne M. Thomas and Michael Damian Thomas, Uncanny Magazine, 2016	Swords Against Darkness ed. Paula Guran, Prime Books, 2017; The Year's Best Science Fiction & Fantasy 2017 ed. Rich Horton, Prime Books, 2017; Meet Me in the Future by Kameron Hurley, Tachyon Publications, 2019; Meet Me in the Future by Kameron Hurley, Highbridge Audio, 2019	
"The Improbable War"	2015	Popular Science, August 2015, ed. Editors of Popular Science, Bonnier Corp, 2015	Meet Me in the Future by Kameron Hurley, Tachyon Publications, 2019; Meet Me in the Future by Kameron Hurley, Highbridge Audio, 2019	
"Body Politic"	2015	Meeting Infinity ed. Jonathan Strahan, Solaris Books, 2015	Future Artifacts by Kameron Hurley, Apex Publications, 2022; Future Artifacts by Kameron Hurley, Recorded Books, 2022	
"The Light Brigade"	2015	Lightspeed, issue 66, ed. John Joseph Adams, Lightspeed Magazine, 2015	Pwning Tomorrow: An Anthology of Short Fiction from the Electronic Frontier ed. Dave Maass, Electronic Frontier Foundation, 2015; Orson Scott Card's Intergalactic Medicine Show, issue No. 51, ed. Edmund R. Schubert, Hatrack River Enterprises, 2016; Meet Me in the Future by Kameron Hurley, Tachyon Publications, 2019; Meet Me in the Future by Kameron Hurley, Highbridge Audio, 2019	
"The Heart Is Eaten Last"	2016	Forever. issue 22 ed. Neil Clarke, Wyrm Publishing, 2016	Apocalypse Nyx by Kameron Hurley, Tachyon Publications, 2018; Apocalypse Nyx by Kameron Hurley, Recorded Books and Blackstone Publishing, 2018	Bel Dame Apocrypha
"Soulbound"	2016	Self-published on Kameron Hurley's Patreon	Apocalypse Nyx by Kameron Hurley, Tachyon Publications, 2018; Apocalypse Nyx by Kameron Hurley, Recorded Books and Blackstone Publishing, 2018	Bel Dame Apocrypha
"The Sinners and the Sea"	2016	Self-published on Kameron Hurley's Patreon	Meet Me in the Future by Kameron Hurley, Tachyon Publications, 2019; Meet Me in the Future by Kameron Hurley, Highbridge Audio, 2019	
"The War of Heroes"	2016	Lightspeed, issue 75, ed. John Joseph Adams, Lightspeed Magazine, 2016	Meet Me in the Future by Kameron Hurley, Tachyon Publications, 2019; Meet Me in the Future by Kameron Hurley, Highbridge Audio, 2019	
"The Judgement of Gods and Monsters"	2016	Beneath Ceaseless Skies, issue 200, ed. Scott H. Andrews, Scott H. Andrews, 2016	Future Artifacts by Kameron Hurley, Apex Publications, 2022; Future Artifacts by Kameron Hurley, Recorded Books, 2022	
"The Red Secretary"	2016	Self-published on Kameron Hurley's Patreon	Uncanny Magazine, issue 15, ed. Lynne M. Thomas and Michael Damian Thomas, Uncanny Magazine, 2017; Meet Me in the Future by Kameron Hurley, Tachyon Publications, 2019; Meet Me in the Future by Kameron Hurley, Highbridge Audio, 2019	
"Crossroads at Jannah"	2017	Self-published on Kameron Hurley's Patreon	Apocalypse Nyx by Kameron Hurley, Tachyon Publications, 2018; Apocalypse Nyx by Kameron Hurley, Recorded Books and Blackstone Publishing, 2018	Bel Dame Apocrypha
"Paint it Red"	2017	Self-published on Kameron Hurley's Patreon	Apocalypse Nyx by Kameron Hurley, Tachyon Publications, 2018; Apocalypse Nyx by Kameron Hurley, Recorded Books and Blackstone Publishing, 2018	Bel Dame Apocrypha
"Our Faces, Radiant Sisters, Our Faces Full of Light!"	2017	Tor.com March 8, 2017, ed. Marco Palmieri, Tor.com, 2017	Meet Me in the Future by Kameron Hurley, Tachyon Publications, 2019; Meet Me in the Future by Kameron Hurley, Highbridge Audio, 2019; Nevertheless, She Persisted: Flash Fiction Project: A Tor.com Original, Tor Books, 2020	
"Warped Passages"	2017	Cosmic Powers ed. John Joseph Adams, Saga Press, 2017	Meet Me in the Future by Kameron Hurley, Tachyon Publications, 2019; Meet Me in the Future by Kameron Hurley, Highbridge Audio, 2019	
"Tumbledown"	2017	Apex Magazine, September 2017, ed. Jason Sizemore, Apex Publications, 2017	Meet Me in the Future by Kameron Hurley, Tachyon Publications, 2019; Meet Me in the Future by Kameron Hurley, Highbridge Audio, 2019	
"The Fisherman and the Pig"	2017	Beneath Ceaseless Skies, issue 235, ed. Scott H. Andrews, Scott H. Andrews, 2017	The Year's Best Science Fiction & Fantasy, 2018 Edition ed. Rich Horton, Prime Books, 2018; Meet Me in the Future by Kameron Hurley, Tachyon Publications, 2019; Meet Me in the Future by Kameron Hurley, Highbridge Audio, 2019	
"Sister Solveig and Mr. Denial"	2018	Amazing Stories, Fall/Worldcon 2018, ed. Ira Nayman, Experimenter Publishing Company, 2018		
"When We Fall"	2018	Escape Pod, No. 611, ed. Divya Breed and Mur Lafferty, Escape Artists, Inc., 2018	Meet Me in the Future by Kameron Hurley, Tachyon Publications, 2019; Meet Me in the Future by Kameron Hurley, Highbridge Audio, 2019	
"Garda"	2018	"Garda", Kameron Hurley, Barnes & Noble Books (B&N SFF Originals), 2018	Meet Me in the Future by Kameron Hurley, Tachyon Publications, 2019; Meet Me in the Future by Kameron Hurley, Highbridge Audio, 2019	
"After the End of the World"	2018	Particulates ed. Nalo Hopkinson, Dia Art Foundation, 2018		
"Corpse Soldier"	2019	Uncanny Magazine, issue 28, ed. ed. Lynne M. Thomas and Michael Damian Thomas, Uncanny Magazine, 2019	Future Artifacts by Kameron Hurley, Apex Publications, 2022; Future Artifacts by Kameron Hurley, Recorded Books, 2022	
"The Body Remembers"	2019	Current Futures: A Sci-fi Ocean Anthology ed. Ann VanderMeer, XPRIZE, 2019	Future Artifacts by Kameron Hurley, Apex Publications, 2022; Future Artifacts by Kameron Hurley, Recorded Books, 2022	
"Coda" (The Worldbreaker Saga)	2021	The Worldbreaker Saga Kameron Hurley, Angry Robot, 2021		The Worldbreaker Saga
"The Tomb of the Flesh Dealer"	2021	Grimdark Magazine ed. Adrian Collins, Grimdark Magazine, 2021		
"Antibodies"	2022	Future Artifacts by Kameron Hurley, Apex Publications, 2022; Future Artifacts by Kameron Hurley, Recorded Books, 2022		
"Broker of Souls"	2022	Future Artifacts by Kameron Hurley, Apex Publications, 2022; Future Artifacts by Kameron Hurley, Recorded Books, 2022		
"Citizens of Elsewhere"	2022	Future Artifacts by Kameron Hurley, Apex Publications, 2022; Future Artifacts by Kameron Hurley, Recorded Books, 2022		
"Leviathan"	2022	Future Artifacts by Kameron Hurley, Apex Publications, 2022; Future Artifacts by Kameron Hurley, Recorded Books, 2022		
"Moontide"	2022	Future Artifacts by Kameron Hurley, Apex Publications, 2022; Future Artifacts by Kameron Hurley, Recorded Books, 2022		
"Our Prisoners, the Stars	2022	Future Artifacts by Kameron Hurley, Apex Publications, 2022; Future Artifacts by Kameron Hurley, Recorded Books, 2022		
"Overdark"	2022	Future Artifacts by Kameron Hurley, Apex Publications, 2022; Future Artifacts by Kameron Hurley, Recorded Books, 2022		
"Sky Boys"	2022	Future Artifacts by Kameron Hurley, Apex Publications, 2022; Future Artifacts by Kameron Hurley, Recorded Books, 2022		
"The One We Feed"	2022	Future Artifacts by Kameron Hurley, Apex Publications, 2022; Future Artifacts by Kameron Hurley, Recorded Books, 2022		
"The Skulls of Our Fathers"	2022	Future Artifacts by Kameron Hurley, Apex Publications, 2022; Future Artifacts by Kameron Hurley, Recorded Books, 2022		
"The Traitor Lords"	2022	Future Artifacts by Kameron Hurley, Apex Publications, 2022; Future Artifacts by Kameron Hurley, Recorded Books, 2022		
"Unblooded"	2022	Future Artifacts by Kameron Hurley, Apex Publications, 2022; Future Artifacts by Kameron Hurley, Recorded Books, 2022		
"We Burn"	2022	Future Artifacts by Kameron Hurley, Apex Publications, 2022; Future Artifacts by Kameron Hurley, Recorded Books, 2022		

=== Nonfiction ===
- "Locus Commentary" series, Locus, Locus Publications, 2013–2018
- "On the Business of Writing, Creativity, and Burnout", Journey Planet, issue No. 15, ed. James Bacon, Christopher J. Garcia, and Lynda E. Rucker, 2013
- "Making excuses for science fiction". Locus (635): 25. Dec 2013.
- "We Have Always Fought: Challenging the Women, Cattle and Slave Narrative", Lightspeed, issue 49, ed. Christie Yant, Lightspeed Magazine, 2014
- "Language and Imaginative Resistance in Epic Fantasy", Fantasy Magazine, issue 58, ed. Cat Rambo, Fantasy Magazine, 2014
- "I Don't Care About Your MFA: On Writing vs. Storytelling", Uncanny Magazine, issue 4, ed. Lynne M. Thomas and Michael Damian Thomas, Uncanny Magazine, 2015
- "Creating Better Fantasy Economies", Fantasy-Faction Anthology ed. Marc Aplin and Jennie Ivins, Fantasy-Faction, 2015
- The Geek Feminist Revolution, Tor Books, 2016
- "The Sad Economics of Writing Short Fiction", Locus, ed. Liza Groen Trombi, Locus Publications, 2016
- "Why I'm Not Afraid of the Internet", Orson Scott Card's Intergalactic Medicine Show, issue No. 51, ed. Edmund R. Schubert, Hatrack River Enterprises, 2016
- "Fear, Procrastination, and the Thorny Problem of Demanding What You're Worth", Locus, ed. Liza Groen Trombi, Locus Publications, 2017
- "On Patience, Goal-setting, and Gardening", Locus, ed. Liza Groen Trombi, Locus Publications, 2018
- "An Introduction: Meet Me in the Future", Meet Me in the Future by Kameron Hurley, Tachyon Publications, 2019
- "It's Okay if This Email Finds You Well", Locus, ed. Liza Groen Trombi, Locus Publications, 2020
