= The Fourth Network =

2004 book by Daniel M. Kimmel

- Hardcover
- Author: Daniel M. Kimmel
- Language: English
- Genre: Non-fiction, journalism, television
- Published: 2004
- Publication place: United States
- Media type: Print (hardcover, paperback)
- ISBN: 1-566-63572-1

The Fourth Network: How Fox Broke the Rules and Reinvented Television (ISBN 1-566-63572-1) is a non-fiction book about the history of the Fox television network. It was written by Daniel M. Kimmel and published in 2004. The Fourth Network details the history of Fox up until the 1999-2000 broadcast season, with events happening afterward included in an epilogue.

Many times throughout the book Kimmel makes a point of how Fox, during its first 20 years of existence, radically changed the standards by which network television stations in America operate, such as putting an emphasis on looking at demographics in show ratings as opposed to overall viewership, and working with cable television suppliers in order to attain a broader audience.

While much of the book, which is laden with interviews of former network executives, deals with the network's prime time programming, some material is left to the network's other endeavors, both successful and unsuccessful, such as Fox's stunning acquisition of the rights to NFL games, the start-up of the Fox Kids Saturday morning cartoon block, as well Fox's failed attempts at a morning show and late-night talk shows.

== Reception ==
In 2005, the book won the Goddard Book Award from the Cable Center for best book of 2004. Publishers Weekly called the book "a solid but rather dry account of the birth of a network and its impact on TV".

== See also ==
- Fourth television network
