= Diana Pavlac Glyer =

American author, speaker, and teacher (born 1956)

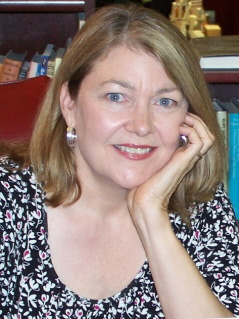
- Born: January 21, 1956 (age 70); Aberdeen, Maryland
- Education: Bowling Green University (BS, BA); Northern Illinois University (MS); University of Illinois at Chicago (PhD)
- Occupations: Author, speaker, teacher
- Spouse(s): Ross Pavlac (div.); Mike Glyer
- Children: Sierra Glyer

Diana Pavlac Glyer (born January 21, 1956 in Aberdeen, Maryland) is an American author, speaker and teacher whose work centers on C. S. Lewis, J. R. R. Tolkien and the Inklings. She teaches in the Honors College at Azusa Pacific University in California.

== Education ==
Glyer received a B.S. in education and a B.A. in English and fine arts from Bowling Green State University. She received her M.S. in education from Northern Illinois University and her PhD in English from the University of Illinois at Chicago.

Glyer also did coursework in composition studies at Purdue University and the University of New Hampshire, where she studied under Robert J. Connors and Donald Murray.

== Career ==
Glyer has published widely, including contributions to dozens of books and periodicals. Her best-known work is The Company They Keep, which describes the interaction and creative influence of C.S. Lewis, J.R.R. Tolkien and the Inklings. It has an appendix by the scholar David Bratman. Published in 2007, the book overturned assumptions held for more than 30 years. It was recognized as a landmark study. The Company They Keep won the Mythopoeic Scholarship Award (Inklings Studies) and was a finalist for the 2008 Hugo Award for Best Related Work at Denvention 3, the 66th World Science Fiction Convention.

Glyer is also the author of Clay in the Potter's Hands (2011), Clay in the Potter’s Hands Second Edition (2020), Clay in the Potter’s Hands Workbook: Second Edition (2020), Clay in the Potter’s Hands Revised and Expanded (2025), Clay in the Potter's Hands Workbook/Barro en Las Del Alfaro LIBRO de TRABAJO: English/Spanish Edition, The Major and the Missionary: The Letters Of Warren Hamilton Lewis And Blanche Biggs (2023), A Compass for Deep Heaven: Navigating the C.S. Lewis Ransom Trilogy (2021), Barro en Las Manos Del Alfarero: Second Edition (Spanish Edition) (2020), Journey Back Again: Reasons to Revisit Middle-earth (2022), and The Liberal Arts in Higher Education, Letters from Jack: Practical Advice from the Pen of C.S. Lewis (2023), A Merrier World: Unsung Vrtues in Tolkien’s Middle-earth (2020), C.S. Lewis: Friends and Foes (2021), Relevant Then, Relevant Now: The Timeless Wisdom of C.S. Lewis (2021), Solving Divine Problems: Perspectives on the Toughest Questions Posed by Dante’s Masterpiece (2018), A Restless Heart Finds Home: Pivotal Concepts in St. Augustine’s Confessions (2025), Bandersnatch: C.S. Lewis, J. R. R. Tolkien, and the Creative Collaboration of the Inklings (2016). Bandersnatch, published in 2016, applies the scholarly work of The Company They Keep to creative writing groups, encouraging them to function collaboratively just as the Inklings did.

== Awards ==
The Company They Keep won the Mythopoeic Scholarship Award (Inklings Studies), the APU Scholarly Achievement Award (2008) and the Imperishable Flame Award for Tolkien Studies. It was a finalist for the 2008 Hugo Award for Best Related Work at Denvention 3, the 66th World Science Fiction Convention.

For her work, Glyer has received many awards, including the Marion E. Wade Center's Clyde S. Kilby Research Grant (1997), Azusa Pacific University's Chase Sawtell Inspirational Teaching Award (2002), APU's Scholarly Achievement Award (2008) and APU's Teaching Excellence and Campus Leadership Award (2014), and APU’s Mary Hill Award (2024). She was the Scholar Guest of Honor for the 40th Annual Mythopoeic Conference, UCLA 2009. In 2019, Glyer was awarded the Paul F. Ford Award for Excellence in the C.S. Lewis Scholarship.

== Science fiction activity ==
Glyer has been active in science fiction fandom since 1973 and has worked on dozens of conventions. In 1985, she chaired Mythcon XVI at Wheaton College in Wheaton, Illinois. In 1998, she chaired Mythcon XXIX, the C.S. Lewis Centenary Celebration at Wheaton College.
