= Staying Alive: A Writer's Guide =

Staying Alive: A Writer's Guide is a book by Norman Spinrad published in 1983.

== Contents ==
Staying Alive: A Writer's Guide is a book which details the economics of how the publication industry works.

== Reception ==
Dave Langford reviewed Staying Alive: A Writer's Guide for White Dwarf #46, and stated that "even as he denounces the hideous effects of corporate politics and accountancy on SF publishing, he plainly relishes and can't stop using the soulless jargon of Big Money and Big Hype with all its horrid incantatory value Illuminating, but a pain to read."

== Reviews ==
- Review by Christopher Priest (1983) in Foundation, #29 November 1983
- Review by John Silbersack (1984) in Heavy Metal, February 1984
- Review by Robert Coulson (1984) in Amazing Science Fiction, March 1984
