= Willis E. McNelly =

Willis E. McNelly

Willis Everett McNelly (December 16, 1920 – April 7, 2003) was an American literature professor and writer who authored The Dune Encyclopedia, the 1984 companion to Frank Herbert's Dune series of science fiction novels.

The son of an avid science fiction reader of the same name, McNelly grew up immersed in science fiction, which he later preferred to call "speculative fiction." Securing a doctorate in English literature from Northwestern University, McNelly later edited the first university-level textbooks on science fiction as literature in the mid-1960s, in particular Above the Human Landscape and Mars, We Love You, co-edited with his fellow teacher, Jane Hipolito.

An "internationally recognized scholar and authority on the writings of Geoffrey Chaucer, T. S. Eliot, James Joyce, William Shakespeare and William Butler Yeats," McNelly was "best known for his pioneering efforts to win acceptance of science fiction as a serious form of modern literature."

Named California State University, Fullerton professor of the year in 1975, McNelly received the California State University Outstanding Professor of the Year award in 1976. McNelly fostered the science fiction wing of the Cal State Fullerton Pollak Library where original manuscripts of many science fiction authors, including Philip K. Dick and Frank Herbert, are located. McNelly was appointed the Curator of the library's Science Fiction Collection in Spring 2000. Most of the over 5,000 science fiction books contained in the wing are from the combined collection of Willis Jr. and his father.

McNelly wrote the eulogy for close friend Frank Herbert in 1986; following Herbert's death, McNelly tried to reprint The Dune Encyclopedia—itself originally approved by Herbert—but the Herbert Estate (currently named the Herbert Limited Trust) refused to allow it.

McNelly died of cancer on April 7, 2003, at St. Jude Medical Center in Fullerton, California.
