= The Dune Encyclopedia =

Book by Willis E. McNelly

- First edition cover
- Author: Willis E. McNelly
- Illustrator: Matt Howarth, et al.
- Language: English
- Series: Dune franchise
- Genre: Science fiction Non-fiction
- Published: 1984
- Publisher: Berkley
- Publication place: United States
- Media type: Print (Paperback)
- Pages: 526
- ISBN: 0-425-06813-7
- OCLC: 10836869

The Dune Encyclopedia is a 1984 collection of essays written by Willis E. McNelly and multiple other contributors as a companion to Frank Herbert's Dune series of science fiction novels.

== Overview ==
The Dune Encyclopedia, written by McNelly and 43 other contributors as a companion to the Dune series, was published in paperback in 1984. It describes in great detail many aspects of the Dune universe not covered in the novels themselves, such as character biographies and explanations of key elements, including planets, factions like the Bene Gesserit and Mentats, the spice melange, and technology such as heighliners and stillsuits.

== Publication ==
The Dune Encyclopedia was published by Berkley Books, an imprint of Putnam, the publisher of all of Frank Herbert's Dune novels. The cover called the work "complete" and "authorized". Additionally, Frank Herbert approved the book, considering it "amusing" and "fascinating". The Encyclopedia was compiled and published between God Emperor of Dune (1981) and Heretics of Dune (1984), and Herbert "read large portions of God Emperor of Dune, then in the final stages, to McNelly during the compiling of the volume so that McNelly could keep abreast of developments." Herbert himself wrote the foreword for the Encyclopedia (dated November 1983), which noted:

Here is a rich background (and foreground) for the Dune Chronicles, including scholarly bypaths and amusing sidelights. Some of the contributions are sure to arouse controversy, based as they are on questionable sources ... I must confess that I found it fascinating to re-enter here some of the sources on which the Chronicles are built. As the first "Dune fan", I give this encyclopedia my delighted approval, although I hold my own counsel on some of the issues still to be explored as the Chronicles unfold.

The Dune Encyclopedia is written as an encyclopedia published within the Dune universe itself, edited by "Hadi Benotto", a fictional archaeologist mentioned by Frank Herbert in his novels God Emperor of Dune and Heretics of Dune. Rather than claiming to contain absolute fact about this universe, the introduction by Benotto notes that "readers of The Dune Encyclopedia should understand its limitations: it is not designed as a definitive study of the entire eras encompassed by the Atreides Imperium" and that a portion of the (fictional) source material is shaped by the interests and influences of the God Emperor Leto II.

In 1999, McNelly stated that he had proposed to Frank Herbert that they collaborate on a Dune prequel novel, expanding upon the Butlerian Jihad story presented in The Dune Encyclopedia. He noted, "FH and I had discussed writing it together and he agreed with my general plot outline, completed first chapter, and so on but his untimely death prevented us from continuing."

Beginning in 1999, Frank Herbert's son Brian Herbert and novelist Kevin J. Anderson began writing and publishing a series of Dune prequel novels, leading to a renewed interest in an expanded Dune universe. Around this time McNelly made efforts to have The Dune Encyclopedia reprinted, however the Herbert Estate (now known as the Herbert Limited Trust) would not authorize it. The Dune Encyclopedia was subsequently declared non-canon on the official Dune website in a letter credited to Brian Herbert, Anderson and McNelly:

The Dune Encyclopedia reflects an alternate "Dune universe" which did not necessarily represent the "canon" created by Frank Herbert. Frank Herbert's son, Brian Herbert, writing with Kevin J. Anderson, IS continuing to establish the canon of the Dune universe. This is being done with the full approval of the owner of the Dune copyright, the Herbert Limited Partnership.
While Frank Herbert himself considered The Dune Encyclopedia interesting and entertaining, he did not refer to Dr. McNelly's derivative work while writing any of his Dune novels. Likewise, in writing their Dune novels (beginning with Dune: House Atreides), Brian Herbert and Kevin J. Anderson have exclusively used, and will continue to use, Frank Herbert's original notes as well as their own imaginations, and not The Dune Encyclopedia.

== Contributors ==
Entries in the encyclopedia were written by multiple contributors: Joan Bouchelle, Edgar L. Chapman, Judith A. Clark, Michael Clayton, Grace W. Eckley, Greta Eisner, Peter Facione, J.L. Germain, J.H. Gervais, Stephen Goldman, Lee Granell, Jane Hipolito, William Hornaday, Wesley D. Ives, Edward M. Jennings, Alan Kaye, Dorothy Kilker, Gillian Kitrick, Linda R. Levy, Gregory Lichtenberg, Victoria Lustbader, Michael W. McClintock, Willis McNelly, Douglas J. McReynolds, Walter E. Meyers, Frederic H. Miler, Myron Orleans, Charles A. Povlovich, John Quijada, Julia Reed, R. Reginald, Thomas E. Roberts, John A. Ryan, Roger Schlobin, Maureen A. Shifflett, Ray C. Shifflett, Joyce Tally, Stephen Tobias, Michael Tolley, Robert Trowbridge, John A. Turner, Christine Watson, and Carl B. Yoke. Matt Howarth created the illustrations appearing in many of the entries.

== Reception ==
Dave Langford reviewed The Dune Encyclopaedia for White Dwarf #61, and stated that "The production is quite impressive, though real or faked photos instead of line-drawings would have added greatly to the 'encyclopaedia' look. Whether it's of interest to mere readers is debatable, but game-players and trivia hounds will be fascinated."

Colin Greenland reviewed The Dune Encyclopedia for Imagine magazine, and stated, "Unlike existing reader's guides to the worlds of Tolkien and others, The Dune Encyclopedia is itself a work of fiction, rich in imaginary footnotes and learned sources, and 'newly discovered information'. Herbert himself is (of course) delighted, but promises 'Issues still to be explored as the Chronicles unfold'. Where will it end?"

The work also received additional reviews:

- Review by Arthur O. Lewis (1984) in Fantasy Review, September 1984
- Review by Don D'Ammassa (1984) in Science Fiction Chronicle, #61 October 1984
- Review by Alma Jo Williams (1984) in Science Fiction Review, Winter 1984
- Review by Thomas A. Easton [as by Tom Easton] (1984) in Analog Science Fiction/Science Fact, November 1984
- Review by Algis Budrys (1984) in The Magazine of Fantasy & Science Fiction, November 1984
- Review by Gene DeWeese (1984) in Science Fiction Review, Winter 1984
- Review by Patricia Matthews (1984) in Thrust, #21, Fall 1984/Winter 1985
- Review by Robert Coulson (1985) in Amazing Science Fiction, January 1985
- Review by Joseph Nicholas (1985) in Paperback Inferno, #52
