= The Internet Review of Science Fiction =

- Owner: Bluejack
- Website: www.irosf.com
- Commercial: No
- Launched: 2004
- Current status: Defunct (2010)

The Internet Review of Science Fiction was an American webzine devoted to science fiction criticism. It featured critical articles as well as reviews of short fiction and novels.

== History ==
The magazine was published from 2004 to 2010 and published articles, essays, interviews, reviews, and criticism on work in the genres of science fiction and fantasy. Notable authors include John Joseph Adams, Jay Lake, and Kristine Kathryn Rusch, as well as a monthly short fiction review written by Lois Tilton. Asimov's Science Fiction writer rated the website as one of the best science fiction opinion sites in 2005. From 2007 to 2009, the Internet Review of Science Fiction was ranked within the top 25 science fiction magazines by the Locus Awards.

In 2008, the magazine partnered with Romania SF Online to publish selected articles in Romanian. The magazine's last issue was in February 2010. Financial shortcomings were cited as the reason for the magazine folding.

== Editors ==
It was largely the concept and creation of John Frost, who was also the first editor in chief. The last editor was Stacey Janssen.
