= 1974 in science fiction =

The year 1974 was marked, in science fiction, by the following:

== Events ==
- The 32nd annual Worldcon, Discon II, is held in Washington, D.C., USA

== Births and deaths ==
=== Births ===
- Nnedi Okorafor

=== Deaths ===
- P. Schuyler Miller
- Charles R. Tanner

== Literary releases ==
=== Novels ===
- Dhalgren, by Samuel R. Delany
- Flow My Tears, the Policeman Said, by Philip K. Dick
- The Forever War, by Joe Haldeman
- The Dispossessed, by Ursula K. Le Guin
- The Mote in God's Eye, by Larry Niven and Jerry Pournelle

=== Comics ===
- First issue of Métal Hurlant published
- First issue of Star Reach published

== Movies ==
- Dark Star
- Space is the Place
- The Terminal Man
- Zardoz

== Television ==
- Space Battleship Yamato

== Video games ==
- Star Trader

== Awards ==
=== Hugos ===
- Best novel: Rendezvous with Rama, by Arthur C. Clarke
- Best novella: The Girl Who Was Plugged In, by James Tiptree Jr.
- Best novelette: "The Deathbird", by Harlan Ellison
- Best short story: "The Ones Who Walk Away from Omelas", by Ursula K. Le Guin
- Best dramatic presentation: Sleeper, dir. by Woody Allen; based on a screenplay by Woody Allen and Marshall Brickman
- Best professional editor: Ben Bova
- Best professional artist: Frank Kelly Freas
- Best fanzine: The Alien Critic, ed. by Richard E. Geis and Algol, ed. by Andrew I. Porter (tie)
- Best fan writer: Susan Wood
- Best fan artist: Tim Kirk

=== Nebulas ===
- Best novel: The Dispossessed, by Ursula K. Le Guin
- Best novella: Born with the Dead, by Robert Silverberg
- Best novelette: "If the Stars are Gods", by Gregory Benford and Gordon Eklund
- Best short story: "The Day Before the Revolution" by Ursula K. Le Guin
- Best Dramatic Presentation: Sleeper, by Woody Allen

=== Other awards ===
- BSFA Award for Best Novel: Inverted World, by Christopher Priest
