= 40th World Science Fiction Convention =

40th Worldcon (1982)

Chicon IV, the 40th World Science Fiction Convention
- Genre: Science fiction
- Dates: 2–6 September 1982
- Venue: Hyatt Regency Chicago
- Location: Chicago, Illinois
- Country: United States
- Attendance: 4,275
- Filing status: non-profit

The 40th World Science Fiction Convention (Worldcon), also known as Chicon IV, was held on 2–6 September 1982 at the Hyatt Regency Chicago in Chicago, Illinois, United States.

The chairmen were Ross Pavlac and Larry Propp; Larry Smith and Bob Hillis were vice-chairmen.

== Participants ==
Attendance was 4,275.

=== Guests of honor ===
- A. Bertram Chandler (pro)
- Frank Kelly Freas (pro)
- Lee Hoffman (fan).
- Marta Randall (toastmaster)

=== Other notable participants ===
Other notable attendees included Muppets creator Jim Henson and actor Jeff Pomerantz.

== Awards ==
The World Science Fiction Society administers and presents the Hugo Awards, the oldest and most noteworthy award for science fiction. Selection of the recipients is by vote of the Worldcon members. Categories include novels and short fiction, artwork, dramatic presentations, and various professional and fandom activities.

Other awards may be presented at Worldcon at the discretion of the individual convention committee. This has often included the national SF awards of the host country, such as the Japanese Seiun Awards as part of Nippon 2007, and the Prix Aurora Awards as part of Anticipation in 2009. The Astounding Award for Best New Writer and the Sidewise Award, though not sponsored by the Worldcon, are usually presented, as well as the Chesley Awards, the Prometheus Award, and others. In 2021, the Nommo Awards began presenting at Worldcon.

=== 1982 Hugo Awards ===
At Chicon IV, the Hugo Awards were made of a lucite rocket on a wooden base. This is the only time lucite was used for the award.

- Best Novel: Downbelow Station by C. J. Cherryh
- Best Novella: "The Saturn Game" by Poul Anderson
- Best Novelette: "Unicorn Variations" by Roger Zelazny
- Best Short Story: "The Pusher" by John Varley
- Best Non-Fiction Book: Danse Macabre by Stephen King
- Best Dramatic Presentation: Raiders of the Lost Ark
- Best Professional Editor: Edward L. Ferman
- Best Professional Artist: Michael Whelan
- Best Fanzine: Locus, edited by Charles N. Brown
- Best Fan Writer: Richard E. Geis
- Best Fan Artist: Victoria Poyser

=== Other awards ===
- Special Award: Mike Glyer for "keeping the fan in fanzine publishing"
- John W. Campbell Award for Best New Writer: Alexis A. Gilliland

== See also ==
- Hugo Award
- Science fiction
- Speculative fiction
- World Science Fiction Society
- Worldcon

Preceded by 39th World Science Fiction Convention; Denvention Two in Denver, Colorado, United States (1981)	List of Worldcons; 40th World Science Fiction Convention; Chicon IV in Chicago, Illinois, United States (1982)	Succeeded by 41st World Science Fiction Convention; ConStellation in Baltimore, Maryland, United States (1983)
