= 1966 in science fiction =

The year 1966 was marked, in science fiction, by the following:

== Events ==
- The 24th annual Worldcon, Tricon, was held in Cleveland, USA

== Births and deaths ==
=== Births ===
- Catherine Dufour
- Ann Leckie

=== Deaths ===
- Cordwainer Smith

== Literary releases ==
=== Novels ===
- Babel-17, by Samuel R. Delany
- Do Androids Dream of Electric Sheep?, by Philip K. Dick
- Make Room! Make Room!, by Harry Harrison
- The Moon is a Harsh Mistress, by Robert A. Heinlein
- Rocannon's World, by Ursula K. Le Guin

=== Short stories ===
- "We Can Remember It for You Wholesale", by Philip K. Dick
- "When I Was Miss Dow", by Sonya Dorman

==== Anthologies ====
- Orbit 1, ed. by Damon Knight

=== Comics ===
- Le Mystère des Abîmes, by Phillippe Druillet (first appearance of Lone Sloane)

== Movies ==
- Ebirah, Horror of the Deep
- Fahrenheit 451
- Fantastic Voyage
- The War of the Gargantuas

== Television ==
- Raumpatrouille
- Star Trek
- Ultraman

== Awards ==
=== Hugos ===
- Best novel: Tie between Dune, by Frank Herbert; and This Immortal by Roger Zelazny
- Best short fiction: ""Repent, Harlequin!" Said the Ticktockman", by Harlan Ellison
- Best dramatic presentation: no nominees
- Best Professional magazine: if, ed. by Frederik Pohl
- Best professional artist: Frank Frazetta
- Best fanzine: ERB-dom, by Camille Cazedessus Jr.
- Best all-time series: Foundation, by Isaac Asimov

=== Nebulas ===
- Best novel: Tie between Flowers for Algernon, by Daniel Keyes; and Babel-17, by Samuel R. Delaney
- Best novella: The Last Castle, by Jack Vance
- Best novelette: "Call Him Lord", by Gordon R. Dickson
- Best short story: " The Secret Place", by Richard McKenna
