= 1992 in science fiction =

The year 1992 was marked, in science fiction, by the following:

== Events ==
- The Chandler Award, for Australian science fiction, is established
- The Sci-Fi Channel is launched
- The 50th annual Worldcon, MagiCon, is held in Orlando, USA

== Births and deaths ==
=== Deaths ===
- Isaac Asimov
- Fritz Lieber

== Literary releases ==
=== Novels ===
- The Children of Men, by P. D. James
- A Fire Upon the Deep, by Vernor Vinge
- Poor Things, by Alasdair Gray
- Red Mars, by Kim Stanley Robinson
- Snow Crash, by Neal Stephenson

== Movies ==
- Alien 3, dir. by David Fincher
- The Lawnmower Man, dir. by Brett Leonard
- Universal Soldier, dir. by Roland Emmerich

== Video games ==
- Dune II
- Flashback

== Other media ==
- The Voyage - opera by Philip Glass

== Awards ==
=== Hugos ===
- Best novel: Barrayar, by Lois McMaster Bujold
- Best novella: Beggars in Spain, by Nancy Kress
- Best novelette: "Gold", by Isaac Asimov
- Best short story: "A Walk in the Sun", by Geoffrey A. Landis
- Best related work: The World of Charles Addams, by Charles Addams
- Best dramatic presentation: Terminator 2: Judgment Day, dir. by James Cameron; written by James Cameron and William Wisher, Jr.
- Best professional editor: Gardner Dozois
- Best professional artist: Michael Whelan
- Best original art work: The cover of The Summer Queen, illustrated by Michael Whelan
- Best Semiprozine: Locus, ed. by Charles N. Brown
- Best fanzine: Mimosa, ed. by Dick Lynch and Nicki Lynch
- Best fan writer: Dave Langford
- Best fan artist: Brad W. Foster

=== Nebulas ===
- Best novel: Doomsday Book, by Connie Willis
- Best novella: City of Truth, by James Morrow
- Best novelette: "Danny Goes to Mars", by Pamela Sargent
- Best short story: "Even the Queen", by Connie Willis

=== Other awards ===
- BSFA Award for Best Novel: Red Mars, by Kim Stanley Robinson
- Locus Award for Best Science Fiction Novel: Barrayar, by Lois McMaster Bujold
- Saturn Award for Best Science Fiction Film: Star Trek VI: The Undiscovered Country
