= Fantasy Amateur Press Association =

The Fantasy Amateur Press Association or FAPA ("FAP-uh") is science fiction fandom's longest-established amateur press association ("apa"). It was founded in 1937 by Donald A. Wollheim, John B. Michel and others to facilitate the circulation of fanzines. They were inspired to create FAPA by their memberships in some of the non-science fiction amateur press associations, which they learned about from H. P. Lovecraft. (It is also fandom's longest-running organization of any kind, preceding the founding of the runner-up, the National Fantasy Fan Federation, by nearly four years.)

Like other APAs, FAPA is primarily an agency for distributing to its members publications published by its members at their own expense. FAPA has "mailings" every three months. Members are required to be active in some way — writing or publishing — and produce at least eight pages of activity a year. When needed, there are elections (in August) of a secretary-treasurer and official editor. Other officials have included Official Critics, a Laureate Committee, President, Vice-President, and ballot counters. The first two positions were abandoned by the mid-1940s, and in 2009 the positions of President and Vice-President were also eliminated. The President Emeritus is the author Robert Silverberg, who was the last serving President and who has been an active member of FAPA longer than any other current member. When necessary, a teller for the annual officer elections was appointed by the secretary-treasurer.

FAPA's original constitutional limit was 50 members to accommodate publishers using hectographs. There were 21 members listed on the roster of the first mailing in August 1937; it took until the November 1938 mailing to fill the 50-member roster. The membership limit was raised to 65 in 1943 and has remained at that level ever since.

The early years of FAPA were stormy with party politics and sociological feuds (as recounted in the late Jack Speer's pioneering fan history, Up to Now). In 1947, Speer reformed the constitution, and the Insurgents quashed the last inactive OE, Elmer Perdue. Since then official troubles have mostly not disturbed FAPA, and red tape has been held to a minimum. The constitution was again revised in 1958 (also by Speer) to incorporate amendments, bylaws, and practices adopted since 1947. Another major revision occurred in 2001 under the oversight of Robert Lichtman (Secretary-Treasurer since 1986 and still holding that office), clarifying and conforming constitutional requirements with actual practice.

During the 1950s and 1960s FAPA was so popular and membership so sought after that the waiting list grew to monumental proportions, for a period of time exceeding the number of membership slots on the FAPA roster. A waiting list fee was instituted to cover the cost of sending the Fantasy Amateur to so many fans awaiting membership, and a requirement that waiting listers periodically acknowledge receipt of the Fantasy Amateur was begun in order to weed out those who lost interest during the long wait. By the '70s the waiting list became much smaller, and in more recent years (since the mid 1990s) has disappeared altogether. Additionally, the number of members has also shrunk as existing members died or otherwise dropped off the roster. As of August 2019, there were 17 active participants.

FAPA continues to operate in the 21st Century as a connection to fandom's past, and a way for fans to timebind with those who came before. Find the Facebook Group called "FAPA - SF Fandom's Oldest Apa" for contact and membership information.

== Members ==
Notable members over the years have included:

- Forrest J Ackerman
- Gregory Benford
- John D. Berry
- James Blish
- Robert Bloch
- Marion Zimmer Bradley
- Charles Burbee
- F.M. Busby & his wife Elinor
- Terry Carr
- Jack Chalker
- Louis Russell Chauvenet
- Willis Conover
- Gordon Eklund
- E. Everett Evans
- Ken Forman
- Richard E. Geis
- Steve Green
- Dean Grennell
- Jim Harmon
- Lee Hoffman
- John-Henri Holmberg
- Ben Indick
- Virginia Kidd
- Damon Knight
- Francis Towner Laney
- David Langford
- Bob Leman
- Robert Lichtman
- Robert A.W. Lowndes
- Richard Lupoff & his wife Pat
- David McDaniel aka "Ted Johnstone"
- Daniel L. McPhail
- Judith Merril (under maiden name Judy Zissman)
- John Michel
- Morojo
- Sam Moskowitz
- Bruce Pelz
- Elmer Perdue
- Frederik Pohl
- Frank M. Robinson
- Milton A. Rothman
- William Rotsler
- Julius Schwartz
- George Scithers
- A. Langley Searles
- Robert Silverberg
- Dick Smith
- Jack Speer
- James Taurasi
- Bjo Trimble & her husband John
- Wilson Tucker
- Harry Warner, Jr.
- Charles Wells
- Ted White
- Donald A. Wollheim
