= 1st World Science Fiction Convention =

1st Worldcon (1939)

NyCon I, the 1st World Science Fiction Convention
- Genre: Science fiction
- Dates: 2–4 July 1939
- Venue: Caravan Hall
- Location: New York City
- Country: United States
- Attendance: ~200

The 1st World Science Fiction Convention (Worldcon) was held on 2–4 July 1939 in the Caravan Hall in New York City, New York, in conjunction with the New York World's Fair, which was themed as "The World of Tomorrow". It was later retroactively named "NyCon I" by Forrest J Ackerman.

The convention was chaired by Sam Moskowitz. Along with Moskowitz, other organizers were James V. Taurasi, Sr. and Will Sykora.

== Participants ==
Attendance was approximately 200.

=== Guests of honor ===
The Guest of Honor at the first Worldcon was Frank R. Paul.

=== Other notable participants ===
Also attending were John W. Campbell, Isaac Asimov, L. Sprague de Camp, Ray Bradbury, Hannes Bok, Milton A. Rothman, John D. Clark, Jack Williamson, and Harry Harrison.

=== Controversy ===
In addition to its groundbreaking role as the first of its kind, the convention was noteworthy for the exclusion of a number of politicized Futurians by convention chair Sam Moskowitz; those excluded were Donald A. Wollheim, Frederik Pohl, John Michel, Robert A. W. Lowndes, Cyril M. Kornbluth, and Jack Gillespie, an event known to fannish historians as "The Great Exclusion Act."

According to Pohl, in his autobiography The Way the Future Was, the Futurians held their own counter-convention which was attended by several who went to the regular convention. He also downplayed the aspect that politics played, himself believing that it was a personality conflict between the convention organizers and the Futurians and said "We pretty nearly had it coming," continuing with "What we Futurians made very clear to the rest of New York fandom was that we thought we were better than they were. For some reason that annoyed them."

== Programming and events ==
Ackerman and Morojo at the 1st Worldcon (1939, NYC), in the "futuristicostumes" she created for them

Ackerman and his girlfriend and fellow fanzine editor Myrtle R Douglas (Morojo) attended the convention in "futuristicostumes" designed and sewn by Douglas: this is considered a forerunner to modern fan costuming (which is known as "cosplay").

In 1994, the International Costumers' Guild (ICG) presented a special award to Ackerman recognizing him as the "Father of Convention Costuming" at Conadian, the 52nd Worldcon. In 2016, the ICG recognized Morojo as the “Mother of Convention Costuming” with a video award presentation at MidAmeriCon II, the 74th Worldcon.

== Awards ==
=== 1939 Retro Hugo Awards ===
Hugo Awards were not presented, as the first ones were awarded in 1953. However, in 2014 at the 72nd World Science Fiction Convention held in London, a set of Retro Hugo Awards were presented to honor work that would have been Hugo-eligible had the award existed in 1939:

- Best Novel: The Sword in the Stone by T. H. White
- Best Novella: "Who Goes There?" by John W. Campbell (as "Don A. Stuart")
- Best Novelette: "Rule 18" by Clifford D. Simak
- Best Short Story: "How We Went to Mars" by Arthur C. Clarke
- Best Dramatic Presentation: The War of the Worlds by H. G. Wells, written for radio by Howard E. Koch and Anne Froelick, directed by Orson Welles (The Mercury Theatre on the Air/CBS)
- Best Professional Editor: John W. Campbell
- Best Professional Artist: Virgil Finlay
- Best Fanzine: Imagination!, edited by Forrest J Ackerman, Myrtle Rebecca "Morojo" Douglas, and T. Bruce Yerke
- Best Fan Writer: Ray Bradbury
- Special Committee Award: Jerry Siegel and Joe Shuster, creators of Superman

== See also ==
- World Science Fiction Society

Preceded by (inaugural convention)	List of Worldcons; 1st World Science Fiction Convention; NyCon I in New York City, United States (1939)	Succeeded by 2nd World Science Fiction Convention; Chicon I in Chicago, Illinois, United States (1940)
