= 51st World Science Fiction Convention =

51st Worldcon (1993)

ConFrancisco, the 51st World Science Fiction Convention
- Genre: Science fiction
- Dates: 2–6 September 1993
- Venue: Moscone Convention Center
- Location: San Francisco, California
- Country: United States
- Attendance: 6,602
- Organizer: San Francisco Science Fiction Conventions, Inc.
- Filing status: Non-profit

The 51st World Science Fiction Convention (Worldcon), also known as ConFrancisco, was held on 2–6 September 1993 at the ANA Hotel, Parc Fifty Five, and Nikko Hotels and the Moscone Convention Center in San Francisco, California, United States.

The supporting organization was San Francisco Science Fiction Conventions, Inc. The chairman was David W. Clark.

== Participants ==
Attendance was 6,602, out of 7,725 paid memberships.

=== Guests of honor ===
The guests of honor were called "Honored Guests".

- Larry Niven
- Alicia Austin
- Tom Digby
- Jan Howard Finder
- Mark Twain (Dead GoH; "channeled" by Jon DeCles)
- Guy Gavriel Kay (toastmaster)

At this convention, as one of the "Honored Guests", Larry Niven was carried around the convention in a sedan chair by his fans while wearing a crown.

== Awards ==
The World Science Fiction Society administers and presents the Hugo Awards, the oldest and most noteworthy award for science fiction. Selection of the recipients is by vote of the Worldcon members. Categories include novels and short fiction, artwork, dramatic presentations, and various professional and fandom activities.

Other awards may be presented at Worldcon at the discretion of the individual convention committee. This has often included the national SF awards of the host country, such as the Japanese Seiun Awards as part of Nippon 2007, and the Prix Aurora Awards as part of Anticipation in 2009. The Astounding Award for Best New Writer and the Sidewise Award, though not sponsored by the Worldcon, are usually presented, as well as the Chesley Awards, the Prometheus Award, and others. In 2021, the Nommo Awards began presenting at Worldcon.

=== 1993 Hugo Awards ===
- Best Novel:
  - A Fire Upon the Deep by Vernor Vinge
  - and Doomsday Book by Connie Willis (tie)
- Best Novella: "Barnacle Bill the Spacer" by Lucius Shepard
- Best Novelette: "The Nutcracker Coup" by Janet Kagan
- Best Short Story: "Even the Queen" by Connie Willis
- Best Non-Fiction Book: A Wealth of Fable: An Informal History of Science Fiction in the 1950s by Harry Warner, Jr.
- Best Dramatic Presentation: "The Inner Light" (Star Trek: The Next Generation episode)
- Best Professional Editor: Gardner Dozois
- Best Professional Artist: Don Maitz
- Best Original Artwork: Dinotopia by James Gurney
- Best Semiprozine: Science Fiction Chronicle, edited by Andrew I. Porter
- Best Fanzine: Mimosa, edited by Dick Lynch & Nicki Lynch
- Best Fan Writer: Dave Langford
- Best Fan Artist: Peggy Ranson

=== Other awards ===
- Special Award: Takumi Shibano
- John W. Campbell Award for Best New Writer: Laura Resnick

== Notes ==
ConFrancisco was the last Worldcon not to have its own official website.

The original plan of San Francisco Science Fiction Conventions, Inc. was to hold the convention at the futuristic San Francisco Marriott Marquis, designed by the noted architect Anthony J. Lumsden, which is topped with a jukebox shaped glass tower that makes it look like a skyscraper from a Flash Gordon comic strip by Alex Raymond. This building is a notable example of futurist architecture. However, the hotel backed out of the contract when a more lucrative larger convention wanted to schedule there on the same weekend.

== See also ==
- Hugo Award
- Science fiction
- Speculative fiction
- World Science Fiction Society
- Worldcon

Preceded by 50th World Science Fiction Convention; MagiCon in Orlando, Florida, United States (1992)	List of Worldcons; 51st World Science Fiction Convention; ConFrancisco in San Francisco, California, United States (1993)	Succeeded by 52nd World Science Fiction Convention; ConAdian in Winnipeg, Manitoba, Canada (1994)
