= Holier Than Thou (fanzine) =

Holier Than Thou was a science fiction fanzine edited by Marty Cantor and Robbie Cantor. It was nominated for the 1984, 1985 and 1986 Hugo Awards for Best Fanzine, losing in the first two years to File 770 and in the last to Lan's Lantern.
