= Habakkuk (fanzine) =

Science fiction fanzine

Habakkuk was a science fiction fanzine based in Berkeley, California, and edited by Bill Donaho. It was nominated for the 1961, 1967 and 1995 Hugo Awards for Best Fanzine.

Habakkuk (named after the editor's cat) was published in three phases, which Donaho referred to as "Chapters". Chapter I consisted of six issues (referred to as "Verses") published from February 1960 to July 1961, included illustrations by Trina Robbins, Bjo Trimble, Bill Rotsler, and George Metzger; and articles by Donaho, Art Castillo, Ray Nelson, Ted White, Rich Brown and Kris Neville. This version earned Habakkuk its first Hugo nomination. Chapter II was three issues and ran from May 1966 to February 1967 in FAPA. It included art by Steve Stiles, and articles by Donaho, Castillo, White, Nelson, Alva Rogers, Colin Cameron and Gordon Eklund. This "Chapter" earned Donaho a nomination for the Hugo Award for Best Fan Writer, and a second Hugo nomination for Habakkuk. Chapter III consisted of four issues from Fall 1993 (an 8-page "con report" on Confrancisco) to Fall 1994. The final Chapter included a cover by Robbins (by then mostly known for her work as an underground cartoonist), articles by White, and book reviews by Deb Notkin. This iteration of Habakkuk earned it its third Hugo nomination.
