= Niekas =

American science fiction fanzine

Niekas 20 (cover by Vaughn Bodē)

Niekas (from Lithuanian: nothing or nobody) was a science fiction fanzine published from 1962–1998 by Ed Meskys – also spelled Meškys – of New Hampshire. It won the 1967 Hugo Award for Best Fanzine, and was nominated two other times, losing in 1966 to ERB-dom and in 1989 to File 770.

For the initial five issues, Meskys – at the time a professor and a member of The Tolkien Society at the now-defunct Belknap College in Center Harbor, New Hampshire – edited Niekas by himself, after which he was joined by Felice Rolfe and Anne Chatland. The latter left after issue #8. By the late 1980s he was editing the fanzine by himself. It originated as an apazine before being expanding to a full-fledged fanzine. Meskys continued publication when his employment moved to Mankato State University (now Minnesota State University, Mankato) in Mankato, Minnesota.

Meskys later wrote, "I started a separate mailing-comments zine for the APA, and changed its name to Niekas and started the numbering over again with the June 1962 issue.... Since there was no Tolkien fanzine being published I decided to devote Niekas to Tolkien and try to run at least one Tolkien related piece in each issue." The fanzine played a prominent role in the early development of Tolkien fandom in the United States. Issue #7 included a letter from C. S. Lewis to Meskys that mentions The Lord of the Rings.

In coming years, contributors included Piers Anthony, Isaac Asimov, John Boardman, Vaughn Bodē, Anthony Boucher, Marion Zimmer Bradley ("Bloodthirsty for Power: Vampirism in Hambly’s Those Who Hunt the Night"), Charles N. Brown, Algis Budrys, Avram Davidson, Philip K. Dick ("Naziism and the High Castle"), Raymond Z. Gallun, Jack Gaughan, Harry Harrison, S. T. Joshi, Clyde Kilby, Tim Kirk, Sam Moskowitz, Andre Norton, Andrew J. Offutt, Alexei Panshin, Diana Paxson, Jerry Pournelle, Darrell Schweitzer, Arthur Thompson (ATom), Bjo Trimble, Donald A. Wollheim, Roger Zelazny ("Song of the Ring", a poem).

A "Glossary of Middle Earth" by Al Halevy was an ongoing feature, as was material by Robert Foster, who later published The Complete Guide to Middle-earth,

In 1968, Niekas ceased publication after issue #20, but was revived in 1977 for issue #21. By 1995, Meskys – who had become blind – was the fanzine's editor-in-chief, with Mike Bastrow listed as editor and designer. The final issue of Niekas, #48, described itself as published by Meskys and edited by Joe R. Christopher.
