= Redd Boggs =

American science fiction fan

Dean Walter "Redd" Boggs (2 April 1921 – 9 May 1996) was a science fiction fanzine writer, editor and publisher from Los Angeles, California.

Beginning with his editing of the 1948 Fantasy Annual, and through his fanzines such as Sky Hook, he raising the standards for fan writing and fanzine production. Sky Hook published both fannish and critical material, including early criticism by James Blish. His fanzine Discord was nominated for the Best Fanzine Hugo in 1961. His personal fanzine Spirochete for the Fantasy Amateur Press Association lasted for 76 issues. Boggs was nominated for the Retro Hugo for Best Fan Writer, and Sky Hook was nominated for Best Fanzine. Boggs was also a member of First Fandom.
