= Mainstream (fanzine) =

Mainstream was a science fiction fanzine founded in 1978, headquartered in Seattle and edited by Jerry Kaufman and Suzanne Tompkins. It was nominated for the 1991 Hugo Award for Best Fanzine, losing to Lan's Lantern. It ceased publication in December 1998 with #17.
