= Imagination! =

Imagination! can refer to:

- Imagination! (Epcot pavilion), at Walt Disney World
- Imagination!, a Retro Hugo Award-winning fanzine edited by Forrest J Ackerman and T. Bruce Yerke.
