= 50th World Science Fiction Convention =

50th Worldcon (1992)

MagiCon, the 50th World Science Fiction Convention
- Genre: Science fiction
- Dates: 3–7 September 1992
- Venue: The Peabody Orlando, Clarion Hotel, and the Orange County Convention Center
- Location: Orlando, Florida
- Country: United States
- Attendance: 5,319
- Filing status: non-profit

The 50th World Science Fiction Convention (Worldcon), also known as MagiCon, was held on 3–7 September 1992 at the Clarion Hotel, The Peabody Orlando, and the Orange County Convention Center in Orlando, Florida, United States.

The chairman was Joe Siclari. The vice-chairman was Becky Thomson.

== Participants ==
Attendance was 5,319, out of 6,368 paid memberships.

=== Guests of honor ===
- Jack Vance (pro)
- Vincent Di Fate (artist)
- Walter A. Willis (fan)
- Spider Robinson (toastmaster)
- Mike Resnick (oastmaster for the Meet-the-Pros party)

== Awards ==
The World Science Fiction Society administers and presents the Hugo Awards, the oldest and most noteworthy award for science fiction. Selection of the recipients is by vote of the Worldcon members. Categories include novels and short fiction, artwork, dramatic presentations, and various professional and fandom activities.

Other awards may be presented at Worldcon at the discretion of the individual convention committee. This has often included the national SF awards of the host country, such as the Japanese Seiun Awards as part of Nippon 2007, and the Prix Aurora Awards as part of Anticipation in 2009. The Astounding Award for Best New Writer and the Sidewise Award, though not sponsored by the Worldcon, are usually presented, as well as the Chesley Awards, the Prometheus Award, and others. In 2021, the Nommo Awards began presenting at Worldcon.

=== 1992 Hugo Awards ===
The 1992 Hugo Award base included a black stone backdrop featuring an astronomical scene hand-painted by base designer Phil Tortoricci. The base included orange grating from Cape Canaveral's Pad 29, launch site of America's first successful space satellite, Explorer I.

- Best Novel: Barrayar by Lois McMaster Bujold
- Best Novella: "Beggars in Spain" by Nancy Kress
- Best Novelette: "Gold" by Isaac Asimov
- Best Short Story: "A Walk in the Sun" by Geoffrey A. Landis
- Best Non-Fiction Book: The World of Charles Addams by Charles Addams
- Best Dramatic Presentation: Terminator 2: Judgment Day
- Best Professional Editor: Gardner Dozois
- Best Professional Artist: Michael Whelan
- Best Original Artwork: cover of The Summer Queen by Michael Whelan
- Best Semiprozine: Locus, edited by Charles N. Brown
- Best Fanzine: Mimosa, edited by Dick Lynch & Nicki Lynch
- Best Fan Writer: Dave Langford
- Best Fan Artist: Brad W. Foster

=== Other awards ===
- John W. Campbell Award for Best New Writer: Ted Chiang

== See also ==
- Hugo Award
- Science fiction
- Speculative fiction
- World Science Fiction Society
- Worldcon

Preceded by 49th World Science Fiction Convention; Chicon V in Chicago, Illinois, United States (1991)	List of Worldcons; 50th World Science Fiction Convention; MagiCon in Orlando, Florida, United States (1992)	Succeeded by 51st World Science Fiction Convention; ConFrancisco in San Francisco, California, United States (1993)
