= Sky Hook =

American sci-fi magazine (1948–1957)

Sky Hook was a science fiction fanzine published by Redd Boggs from 1948 to 1957. It was nominated for the 1954 Retro-Hugo for Best Fanzine.

Contributors included Poul Anderson, James Blish, Philip José Farmer, Dean Grennell, David Keller, Virginia Kidd (as "Virginia Blish"), Sam Moskowitz, William Rotsler, and Jack Speer.
