= Apparatchik (disambiguation) =

The term Apparatchik may refer to:

- Apparatchik, a functionary in the Soviet Union
- Apparatchik (fanzine), a fanzine
- Apparatjik, an electronic musical group
