= Stet (fanzine) =

Stet is a science fiction fanzine, which has been published intermittently from Wheeling, Illinois by the married couple Leah and Dick Smith since the early 1990s. It was nominated for the Hugo Award in 1993, 1994 and 2001.

Notable for the mimeograph reproduction and long lettercol of most issues, Stet achieved its highest acclaim for the 2000 issue, a parody of The Old Farmer's Almanac full of extensive reference material on science fiction fandom.

The fanzine was named partly because Leah Zeldes Smith, a journalist, author and editor by trade, had an abiding acquaintance with the proofreader's term stet; partly in affectionate tribute to historic, typographically titled fanzines such as Hyphen and Slant; and partly in punning reference to the Gestetner machines most issues were printed on.
