= Argentus =

- Editor: Steven H Silver
- Categories: Fanzine
- Frequency: Annual
- First issue: September 12, 2001
- Final issue: 2014
- Based in: Deerfield, Illinois
- Language: English
- Website: Argentus website
- ISSN: 2159-6727 (print); 2159-6735 (web)

Argentus was a science fiction fanzine edited by Steven H Silver. It won the Chronic Rift Roundtable Award for Best Fanzine in 2009 and was nominated for the Hugo Award for Best Fanzine three times (2008–2010). The magazine ended publication in 2014.

== Description ==
Published in paper and on-line annually beginning in 2001, Argentus is a general science fiction 'zine. Occasionally an on-line only "Special Edition" is published which focuses on a specific theme. So far these have included science fiction fans and authors on game shows (2005), con-running (2009), and the completion of Neptune's first orbit (2011).

Contributors include Gregory Benford, Julie E. Czerneda, Mike Glyer, Janis Ian, Jay Lake, David Langford, Jack McDevitt, Mike Resnick, Stanley Schmidt, Robert Silverberg, Ted White, and Gene Wolfe.

The cartoonists and illustrators who contributed to Argentus include Sheryl Birkhead, Kurt Erichsen, Stu Shiffman, Maureen Starkey, Steve Stiles, delphyne woods, and Frank Wu.

Each issue contains numerous articles on a variety of topics, which can range from a look at silent film comedians to the tolerance of science fiction fans. The final section of each issue is entitled a "mock section," in which writers are asked to write an entry based on a theme, such as reviewing a fictitious version of a film based on a favorite book. The mock section is separated from the main body of the 'zine by a letter column.
