= 2nd World Science Fiction Convention =

2nd Worldcon (1940)

Chicon I, the 2nd World Science Fiction Convention
- Genre: Science fiction
- Dates: 1–2 September 1940
- Venue: Hotel Chicagoan
- Location: Chicago, Illinois
- Country: United States
- Attendance: 128

The 2nd World Science Fiction Convention (Worldcon), also known as Chicon I, was held on 1–2 September 1940 at the Hotel Chicagoan in Chicago, Illinois, United States.

The convention was chaired by Mark Reinsberg with Erle Korshak (secretary) and Bob Tucker (treasurer) as equal partners. It was organized by fans Russ Hodgkins, T. Bruce Yerke, and Walt Daugherty.

== Participants ==
Attendance was 128.

=== Guests of honor ===
- E. E. "Doc" Smith

=== Other notable participants ===
Also attending were Jack Williamson and Forrest J Ackerman.

== Programming and events ==
=== Masquerade ===
This was the first Worldcon to include a masquerade.

Chicon featured two masquerades, an unofficial event held in Myrtle R. Douglas' hotel room and an official masquerade as part of the program. The official event, called the "Science Fiction Masquerade Party", was held in the evening of the first day, with Jack Speer and Milton A. Rothman as the co-masters of ceremonies. This was the first Worldcon to include an official masquerade.

The winner of the Masquerade Party was David Kyle wearing a Ming the Merciless costume, for which he won an Amazing Stories original cover painting. The Ming costume was created by Leslie Perri, originally for Donald A. Wollheim. However, he considered it too undignified but brought it with him to the convention and Kyle wore it instead. In second place was Robert A. W. Lowndes wearing a Bar Senestro costume (from the novel The Blind Spot by Austin Hall and Homer Eon Flint).

Other costumed attendees included guest of honor E. E. "Doc" Smith as Northwest Smith (from C. L. Moore's series of short stories), Smith's daughter Honey as Clarissa MacDougal (from Smith's own Lensman series), George Tullis as Johnny Black (from L. Sprague de Camp's series of short stories), Cyril M. Kornbluth as The Invisible Man (from H. G. Wells' novella of the same name, wrapped in bandages as in the 1933 film version), three versions of Buck Rogers (Jack Speer, plus convention organizers Erle Korshak and Mark Reinsberg), and both Forrest J Ackerman and Myrtle R. Douglas wearing the "futuristicostumes" they had previously worn to the first Worldcon.

== See also ==
- Hugo Award
- Science fiction
- Speculative fiction
- World Science Fiction Society
- Worldcon

Preceded by 1st World Science Fiction Convention; NyCon I in New York City, United States (1939)	List of Worldcons; 2nd World Science Fiction Convention; Chicon I in Chicago, Illinois, United States (1940)	Succeeded by 3rd World Science Fiction Convention; Denvention I in Denver, Colorado, United States (1941)
