= First Fandom =

Organization for longstanding science fiction fans

First Fandom is an informal association of early, active and well-known science fiction fans.

In 1958, a number of fans at Midwestcon realized amid table-talk that they all had been active in fandom for more than 20 years. This inspired the creation of an organization for longstanding fans under the initial chairmanship of Robert A. Madle, who "in 1958 suggested the idea of forming an organization called First Fandom". Originally, only those fans who were known to have been active in fandom before the cutoff date, January 1, 1938, were eligible. Such fannish activity (or "fanac") including writing to letter columns in science fiction magazines, having been published in fanzines, or having participated in science fiction oriented clubs, or just generally doing fannish things.

The term itself is an oblique reference to Olaf Stapledon's classic science fiction epic Last and First Men. In this book the stages of mankind are enumerated. Thus early 1950s historian of fandom Jack Speer began to label successive generations of fans as First Fandom, Second Fandom, Third Fandom, and so forth... all the way to Seventh Fandom and beyond.

Those applying to membership of the organization must prove they have had 30 years of continuous activity in science fiction fandom. If a person is not selected for membership, they may still become a Sustaining Patron. Patrons are not able to participate in the awards process.

First Fandom annually presents its First Fandom Hall of Fame Award, posthumous award, and Sam Moskowitz Archive Award for excellence in science fiction collecting, at the beginning of the Hugo Awards Ceremony at Worldcon (World Science Fiction Convention).

There is an analogous informal society in Finnish fandom called the Dinosaur Club; the cutoff being the first major Finnish con Kingcon.

== Awards ==
First Fandom recognizes people for their work within the science-fiction community.

=== First Fandom Hall of Fame Award ===
This award "is presented annually for contributions to the field of science fiction dating back more than 30 years. Contributions can be as a fan, writer, editor, artist, agent, or any combination of the five." It is usually presented at the Hugo Awards.

=== Posthumous Hall of Fame Award ===
This award "is presented for contributions to the field of science fiction dating back more than 30 years. The Posthumous Hall of Fame award was established as a separate and equal award with unique criteria in 1994 at Rivercon XIX" and is also usually presented at the Hugos.

=== 1990s ===
1994

- Gerry de la Ree

1995

- Cyril Kornbluth
- Mort Weisinger

1996

- Henry Kuttner

1997

- Mark Reinsberg

1998

- Oswald V. Train
- Tom L. Sherred

1999

- Lynn Hickman

=== 2000s ===
2000

- Theodore R. Cogswell
- Mark Schulzinger

2001

- Gordon R. Dickson

2002

- Martha Beck

2003

- Philip Francis Nowlan

2004

- Edgar Rice Burroughs

2007

- Don H. Dailey

2008

- Isaac Asimov

2009

- Walter J. Daugherty

=== 2010s ===
2010

- Ray Cummings

2011

- Oliver Saari

2012

- James "Rusty" Hevelin

2013

- Ted Dikty
- Raymond A. Palmer

2014

- John 'Ted' Carnell
- Walter H. Gillings

2016

- Olon F. Wiggin
- Lew Martin
- Roy V. Hunt

2017

- Jim Harmon

2018

- June Moffatt
- Len Moffatt

2019

- Bob Shaw
- James White
- Walt Willis

=== 2020s ===
2020

- Chad Oliver

2021

- Richard and Pat Lupoff

2022

- August Derleth

2023

- Ken Kelly
- Conrad H. Ruppert

2024

- Alfred Bester
- Michael David Glicksohn
- Mike Resnick
- Peter Weston

2025

- Damon Knight
- Kate Wilhelm

2026

- Fredric Brown
- Myrtle R. Douglas

=== Sam Moskowitz Award Winners ===
This award, named after the American writer, critic, and historian of science fiction Sam Moskowitz, is "for excellence in science fiction collecting". Most years, the award is presented at the World Science Fiction Convention.

=== 1990s ===
1998

- Christine Moskowitz

1999

- Forrest J Ackerman

=== 2000s ===
2000

- Ray Beam

2001

- Robert Weinberg

2002

- Robert A. Madle

2003

- Rusty Hevelin

2004

- No award given

2005

- No award given

2006

- No award given

2007

- No award given

2008

- Robert C. Peterson
- Frank M. Robinson

2009

- Joseph Wrzos

=== 2010s ===
2010

- No award given

2011

- No award given

2012

- Donn Albright

2013

- Howard Frank

2014

- Mike Ashley

2015

- David Aronovitz

2016

- Stephen D. Korshak
- Ned Brooks

2017

- Jon D. Swartz

2018

- Hal W. Hall

2019

- Dr. Bradford Lyau

=== 2020s ===
2020

- John C. Tibbetts

2021

- Kevin L. Cook

2022

- Doug Ellis
- Deb Fulton

2023

- John L. Coker III

2024

- Joe Siclari
- Edie Stern

2025

- Rob Hansen

2026

- Andrew Porter
- David Ritter
