= BeABohema =

Old science fiction fanzine

BeABohema was a science fiction fanzine edited by Frank Lunney of Quakertown, Pennsylvania. It lasted for twenty issues from 1968 to December 1971, and was nominated for the 1970 Hugo Award for Best Fanzine, losing to Richard E. Geis' Science Fiction Review.

It was known for controversies over such topics as the relationship between the Science Fiction Writers of America and Amazing Stories publisher Ultimate Publishing; and New Wave science fiction.

Among the better-known contributors were Dean Koontz, Piers Anthony (who did a column titled "Babble" for a while), Bill Rotsler, Ted White, Philip José Farmer, James Blish, David Gerrold, Sam Moskowitz, Jay Kinney, Terry Carr, David R. Bunch, and a then-obscure fan named "Gene Klein" who would later become famous as Gene Simmons of KISS.
