= Slant (fanzine) =

Irish fanzine, winner of a 1954 Retrospective Hugo Award

Slant was a science fiction fanzine edited by Walt Willis in collaboration with James White. It was in circulation between 1948 and 1953.

Slant won the retro-Hugo for Best Fanzine of 1954, awarded in 2004.
