= Juanita Coulson =

American novelist (born 1933)

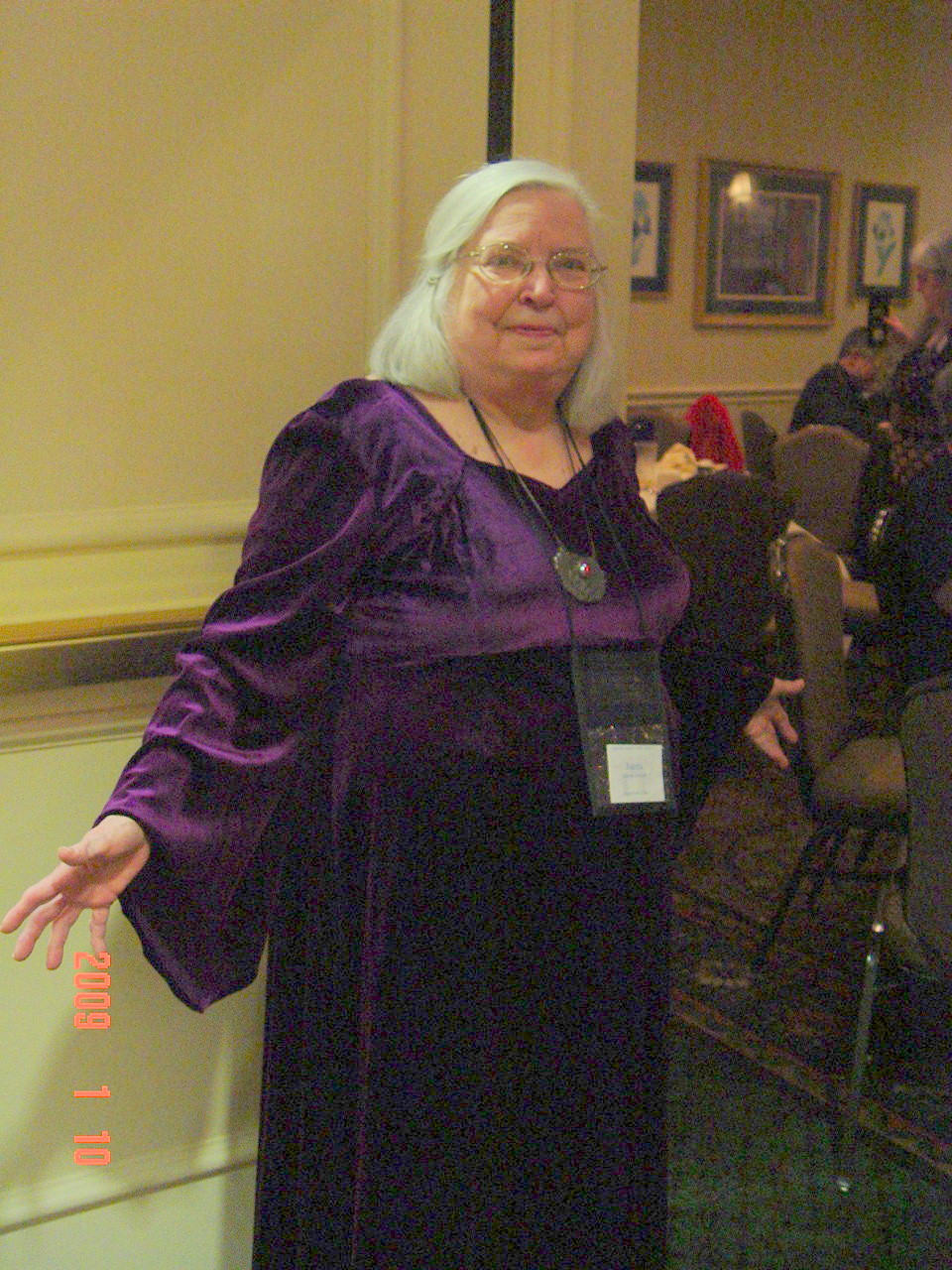
- GAFilk 2009 (convention)
- Born: Juanita Ruth Wellons; February 12, 1933 (age 93) Indiana, United States
- Language: English
- Genre: Science fiction, Fantasy
- Years active: 1957–present
- Spouse: Robert "Buck" Coulson (m. 1954; d. 1999)

Juanita Ruth Coulson (née Wellons) (born February 12, 1933) is an American science fiction and fantasy writer most well known for her Children of the Stars books, published from 1981 to 1989. She was a longtime editor of the science fiction fanzine Yandro.

She is also known for her filk music, receiving numerous awards for her songwriting.

== Career ==
Coulson published her first novel, Crisis on Cheiron, in 1967. She has collaborated with numerous authors including Marion Zimmer Bradley.

Several of her novels concern the exploitation of primitive intelligent species, human expansion, and first contact.

Coulson has also written gothic novels, such as Door Into Terror (1972) about a Satanist cult.

=== Fannish activity ===
She edited the science fiction fanzine Yandro, with her husband Robert Coulson, from 1953 to 1986. Yandro was nominated for the Hugo Award for Best Fanzine every year from 1958 to 1967. The magazine won in 1965, thus making Coulson one of the first women editors to be so honored.

Coulson was a guest of honor at the 2010 NASFiC ReConStruction. She received the "Big Heart Award" for fan activism at Chicon 7 in 2012. In May 2014, Coulson was elected the delegate for the Down Under Fan Fund, and would be attending Continuum X, the 53rd annual Australian national science fiction convention.

=== Filk awards ===
She was inducted into the Filk Hall of Fame in 1996. She was nominated for several Pegasus Awards for filk music, winning the award for Best Writer/Composer in 2012.

== Bibliography ==
Below is an incomplete bibliography:

- "Another Rib," The Magazine of Fantasy & Science Fiction - as John J. Wells, with Marion Zimmer Bradley (1963)
- Crisis on Cheiron (1967)
- The Singing Stones (1968)
- Door into Terror (1972)
- The Secret of Seven Oaks (1972)
- Unto the Last Generation (1975)
- Space Trap (1976)
- Dark Priestess (1977) (historical fantasy set in Babylon during the reign of Hammurabi)
- Fire of the Andes (1979) (Historical romance set during the Spanish conquest of the Inca Empire)
- Star Sister (1990)
- Shadow over Scorpio (2004)
- Witch World: Dictionary - Commissioned in the 1990s by Andre Norton so she could write "Warding of the Witch World" - Never published but it is posted in its entirety at http://andre-norton-books.com/the-witch-world/ww-dictionary

=== Birthstone Gothic series ===
- Stone of Blood (1975)

=== Zodiac Gothic series ===
- Fear Stalks the Bayou (1976)

=== Krantin series ===
- The Web of Wizardry (1978)
- The Death God's Citadel (1980)

=== Children of the Stars series ===
1. Tomorrow's Heritage (1981)
2. Outward Bound (1982)
3. Legacy of Earth (1989)
4. The Past of Forever (1989)

== Discography ==
Below is an incomplete discography:

- Live at Filkcon West (1982)
- Rifles and Rhymes (1984)
- Past and Future Tense (1989)
