= Galactic Journey =

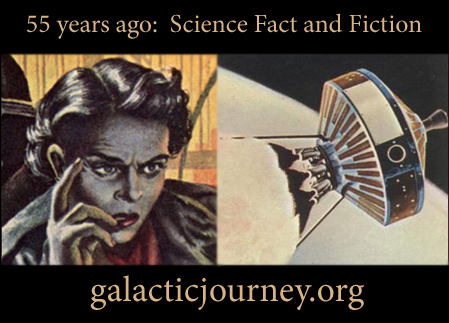
- Owner: Gideon Marcus
- Website: www.galacticjourney.org
- Launched: October 21, 2013; 13 years ago

Galactic Journey is a science fiction blog and fanzine.

Published from October 21, 2013, it is a time-shifted web presence, documenting science fact and fiction from the perspective of fans living exactly 55 years ago, day by day. Focused on science fiction and fantasy literature, film, and television, it also covers life in general, including politics and news. Its mission is to document the past in context rather than from the present looking backward. Despite this, Galactic Journey has a strong progressive bent, spotlighting women and minority creators and characters.

Originally a solo undertaking founded by Gideon Marcus, Galactic Journey began bringing on associate writers to broaden the geographical and genre scope of its articles by 2016. That same year, Galactic Journey was awarded The Serling Award by the Rod Serling Memorial Foundation for its work documenting The Twilight Zone and other science fiction, "...at times [providing] a Serlingesque breakdown of its ties to allegory."

Galactic Journey was a finalist for the Hugo Award for Best Fanzine in 2018, 2019, 2020, 2022, 2023, 2025, and 2026.

== Awards ==
- Serling Award (2016; won)
- Hugo Award for Best Fanzine (2018, 2019, 2020, 2022, 2023, 2025, 2026; finalist)
