= Morojo =

American cosplay pioneer (1904–1964)

- Morojo in 1939, wearing the "futuricostume" she made for the 1st World Science Fiction Convention
- Born: Myrtle Rebecca Douglas; June 20, 1904; Phoenix, Arizona Territory, U.S.
- Died: November 30, 1964 (aged 60); Patton, California, U.S.

Myrtle Rebecca Smith Gray Nolan (née Douglas; June 20, 1904 – November 30, 1964), known to science fiction history as Morojo or sometimes Myrtle R Douglas, was a science fiction fan, fanzine publisher, and cosplay pioneer from Los Angeles.

== Fandom and fanzines ==
Morojo, along with Forrest J Ackerman, was heavily involved in the production of Voice of the Imagi-Nation (which in 1996 would be awarded the Retro Hugo for Best Fanzine of 1946; and has also been nominated for the 1939, 1941 and 1943 Best Fanzine Retro Hugos) and Novacious (nominated for the 1941 Retro Hugo), as well as Jack Speer's Fancyclopedia. She contributed to fanzines by Ackerman and others, and published her own fanzine Guteto from 1941 until 1958 for the Fantasy Amateur Press Association (of which she was a founding member).

Her niece and fellow fan, Patti Gray, known by the Esperanto nickname of "Pogo", in 1940 edited what is credited as "what appears to be the first all-female zine (or femmefan zine), Pogo's STF-ETTE", whose contributors included Morojo and (in its second issue) Leigh Brackett. Morojo served as treasurer and in other roles for the Los Angeles Science Fantasy Society for many years.

=== Esperanto ===
Like Ackerman, Morojo was an avid Esperantist (they met through the Esperanto movement), and the name by which she was known in fandom is a variation of her initials as spelled out in Esperanto, plus Ackerman's middle initial "J".. In Esperanto the names of the consonants consist of the consonant itself plus the letter "o"; thus "Morojo" = "M.R.J."

Morojo and Ackerman broke up in the early 1940s (originally over her continuing to smoke, though that spat was quickly settled) and remained estranged until her death.

== Costuming ==
Together with then-boyfriend Ackerman, she attended the 1939 1st World Science Fiction Convention (Nycon or 1st Worldcon) in New York City dressed in "futuristicostumes", including green cape and breeches, based on the pulp magazine artwork of Frank R. Paul and the 1936 film Things to Come, which were designed, created and sewn by Douglas. Ackerman later stated that he thought everyone was supposed to wear a costume at a science fiction convention, although only he and Douglas did. (At the convention she also distributed copies of her own fanzine Stephan the STFan, created especially for the Nycon.)

Fans liked the concept, and the 2nd Worldcon, in Chicago in 1940, had both an unofficial masquerade held in Morojo's room and an official masquerade as part of the program, with participants (besides Ackerman and Morojo, who performed a brief skit in the costumes they had premiered the year before) including E. E. Smith, Cyril M. Kornbluth, Jack Speer, Wilson Tucker, Robert Lowndes and David Kyle. In 1941, at the Denvention (3rd WorldCon) she wore a frog-faced mask devised for her by a young Ray Harryhausen.

In 2016, the International Costumers' Guild (ICG) recognized Morojo as the “Mother of Convention Costuming” with a video award presentation at MidAmeriCon II, the 74th Worldcon.

== Personal life ==
Douglas was born June 20, 1904, in Phoenix, Arizona to Robert Douglas and Lillie Dell (Kilpatrick) Schutz.

She was married three times: to Virgil Van Buren Smith, Henry Willis Gray, and, lastly, to John Arthur Nolan. She had a son, Virgil Roger Douglas (né Smith). She died November 30, 1964, aged 60, in Patton, California, from undisclosed causes, and was buried at Twentynine Palms Cemetery.
