= Guy H. Lillian III =

American lawyer

Guy Herbert Lillian III
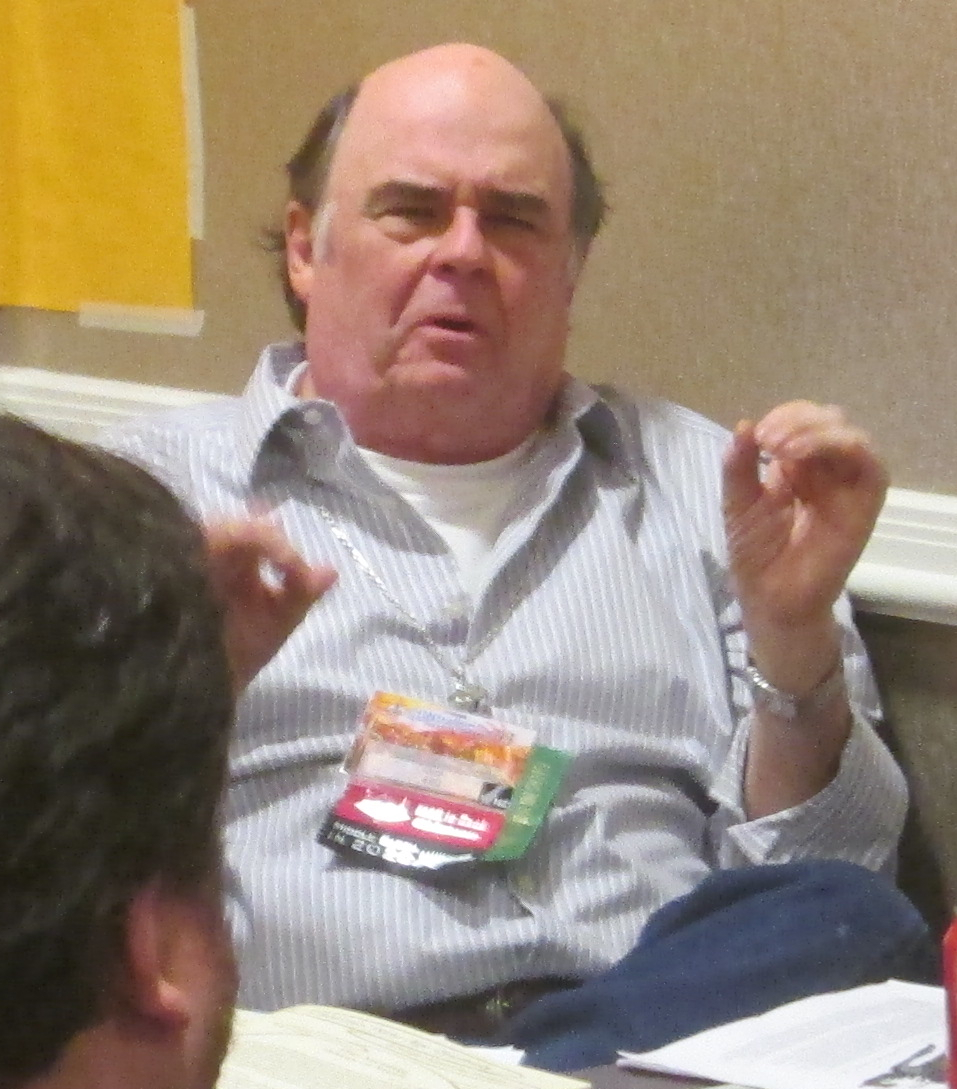
- Lillian at CONtraflow V/DeepSouthCon 53, 2015.
- Born: July 20, 1949; Kern County, California
- Died: August 23, 2025 (aged 76)
- Occupation(s): Lawyer, editor

Guy Herbert Lillian III (20 July 1949 - 23 August 2025) was a Louisiana lawyer, former letterhack and science fiction fanzine publisher notable for having been twice nominated for a Hugo Award as best fan writer and having had a row of 12 nominations (without winning) for the Hugo Award for Best Fanzine for Challenger, which he had published since 1993. He was the 1984 recipient of Southern fandom's Rebel Award.

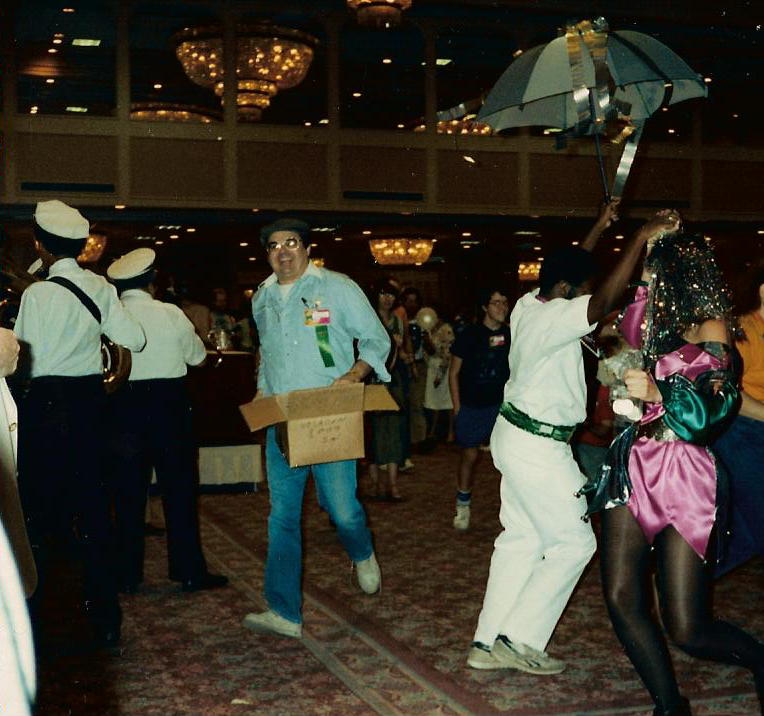
Guy Lillian carrying a box of party supplies at the opening ceremonies of Nolacon II, 1988

Having studied English at Berkeley, writing at the Greensboro, and law at New Orleans, he practiced as a defense lawyer in the field of criminal law in Louisiana as his day job. As of 2015, Lillian was a resident of Florida.

As a noted letterhack and fan of the comic book Green Lantern, Lillian's name was supposedly tributized for the title's character Guy Gardner.
