= The Acolyte (fanzine) =

Science fiction fan magazine

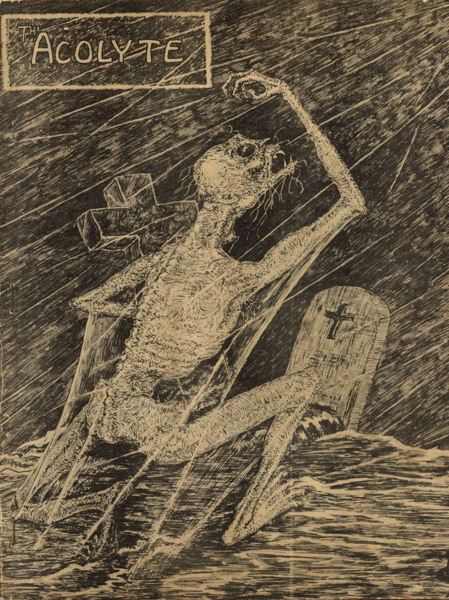
Cover of The Acolyte 13, 1946, drawn by W. Robert Gibson

The Acolyte was a science fiction fanzine edited by Francis Towner Laney from 1942 to 1946 (a total of 14 issues), dedicated to articles about fantasy fiction, with particular emphasis on H. P. Lovecraft and his circle. (Laney's essay, "The Cthulhu Mythology: A Glossary", initially published in the Winter 1942 issue, was expanded at the request of August Derleth and became part of the 1943 Arkham House Lovecraft anthology Beyond the Wall of Sleep.) Later issues were co-edited and published by Samuel D. Russell.

Contributors included Clark Ashton Smith and Donald Wandrei. The first two issues were hectographed, the remainder were mimeographed. Due to its influential role in the field, it is indexed in the Science Fiction, Fantasy, & Weird Fiction Magazine Index compiled by Stephen T. Miller & William G. Contento., as well as fanzine indexes.

It was nominated for the 1946 Retrospective Hugo Award for Best Fanzine, losing to Forrest J Ackerman's Voice of the Imagi-Nation.
