= Hyphen (fanzine) =

Irish science fiction periodical

Hyphen was an Irish science fiction fanzine, published from 1952-1965 by Walt Willis in collaboration with James White, Bob Shaw and various others (Chuck Harris, Vincent Clarke, Arthur Thomson, Ian McAuley and Madeleine Willis). Over that period, they published 36 issues (one including a separate 'Literary Supplement'). In addition, a 37th issue was created by the Willises in 1987 to celebrate the 40th anniversary of Irish science fiction fandom.

Hyphen was nominated for the Hugo Award for Best Fanzine in 1957 and 1959; and for the 1954 Retro-Hugo (In 1958 editor Willis was awarded 1958 Hugo Award as 'Outstanding Actifan' [active fan], which replaced the Best Fanzine category that year.)

Hyphen was considered one of the pivotal fanzines of its era for its humour and wit contributed by writers such as Willis and illustrators such as Thomson (a.k.a. 'ATom'). Science fiction fan, critic and author Damon Knight wrote in a letter of comment on issue #10: "The reason Hyphen is so good, I take it, apart from the accidental assemblage of half a dozen geniuses in Britain, and the reason so many serious and constructive fanzines are so ghastly dull, is that the former is an original contribution, and the latter are self-consciously second-hand. I would like you to ponder this thought though, if it hasn't already occurred to you: it's exactly the fun-loving fanzines like Hyphen, Bradbury's Futuria Fantasia, and Snide (not a plug—the mag's 2nd and final issue was published 14 years ago) which have profoundly influenced science fiction."
