= Yandro =

Science fiction magazine

Yandro was an influential science fiction fanzine published from 1953-1986 by Buck and Juanita Coulson. Over that period, they published 259 issues, the final issue not being distributed until 1991. The headquarters was in North Manchester, Indiana. Yandro's content covered a broad spectrum of topics. It won the Hugo Award for Best Fanzine in 1965, and was a nominee for the Hugo Award 10 years in a row, from 1959 through 1968.

Among other articles, Yandro featured Coulson's incisive reviews of books and, especially, fanzines.

Film critic and one-time fan Roger Ebert wrote: "Locs (letters of comment) were the currency of payment for fanzine contributors; you wrote, and in the next issue got to read about what you had written. Today I can see my name on a full-page ad for a movie with disinterest, but what Harry Warner or Buck Coulson had to say about me — well, that was important."

Yandro's title came from the works of Manly Wade Wellman, who took it from the traditional folk song "He's Gone Away." Yandro is the name of a mountain in North Carolina, whose exact location has been lost. Some believe Yandro (the mountain) never existed at all, and was just another name for one of the other mountains in the region. The song itself talks about a lady whose lover has gone on a journey somewhere past Yandro.
