= Letterhack =

Fan who is regularly published in magazine letter columns

A letterhack is a fan who is regularly published in magazine and American comic book letter columns.

== Origin ==
The term comes from fanspeak, the slang of science fiction fans, and originally referred to prolific writers of letters to fanzines and professional science fiction magazines of the early twentieth century. It was considered to be an important part of fanac ("fan activity").

== Celebrity and recognition ==
Many letterhacks became well known throughout the industry. Writer Mark Engblom describes the phenomenon this way:

Chosen by the title's editor (or, in some cases, the writer), a few lucky fans would get the opportunity to share their opinion with not only the creators, but a captive audience of fellow fans as well. In fact, some of the most prolific fans had letters printed almost every month in a variety of titles, becoming minor celebrities in their own right.

- Jerry Bails — the "father of comics fandom"
- Reed Beebe — over 300 letters published since 2010
- Olav Beemer — became one of the most prolific Dutch comic book translators
- Len Biehl
- Malcolm Bourne
- Brian Earl Brown
- Dale L. Coe
- Augie De Blieck Jr. — claims to have published over 400 letters (184 confirmed through Grand Comics Database)
- Brett Downard
- Joe Frank
- Paul Gambaccini
- Shirley A. Gorman
- Elizabeth Holden
- Paul Dale Roberts — published over 1,000 letters
- Jana C. Hollingsworth
- Kashif "Blue Panther" Husain

- Guy H. Lillian III — omnipresent 1960s letterhack
- Marc Lucas
- T.M. Maple (aka Jim Burke) — published over 3,000 letters
- Joey Marchese
- Rich Morrissey
- "Uncle Elvis" Orten
- Melissa Page
- Kent A. Phenis
- Peter Sanderson
- Bill Schelly — comic book historian
- Al Schroeder III
- Charles J. Sperling
- Irene Vartanoff— omnipresent 1960s letterhack who ended up working behind the scenes for Marvel in the 1970s and 1980s
- Delmo Walters Jr.

David S. Goyer is an example of a fan who later wrote comic book films. Some letterhacks gained entrée into an actual career in comics because of their letter-writing experience. For instance, Bob Rozakis parlayed his frequent published letters to DC comics during the late 1960s and early 1970s into a job as DC's "Answer Man" and eventually a solid career as a DC writer. Kurt Busiek, Mary Jo Duffy, Mike Friedrich, Mark Gruenwald, Fred Hembeck, Harlan Ellison, Tony Isabella, Paul Levitz, Ralph Macchio, Dean Mullaney, Martin Pasko, Diana Schutz, Beau Smith, Roy Thomas, Peter B. Gillis, George R.R. Martin, and Kim Thompson are just a few of the many comic book professionals who got their starts as young letterhacks.

== See also ==
- Comic book letter column
- Fan mail
- Letter to the editor
