= ERB-dom =

ERB-dom, The Fantasy Collector and Pulpdom
- Editor: Camille Cazedessus Jr.
- Categories: Science fiction fanzine
- Frequency: Varies
- First issue: May 1960
- Final issue: 1976
- Country: USA
- Based in: Los Angeles
- Language: English
- Website: pulpdom.com

ERB-dom was a magazine devoted to the works of Edgar Rice Burroughs created by Al Guillory, Jr. and Camille Cazedessus Jr. ("Caz"). It began publication in May 1960 as a mimeographed science-fiction fanzine.

Guillory was killed in a car-train collision, but Cazedessus continued publishing ERB-dom. It won the Hugo Award for Best Fanzine in 1966.

ERB-dom was eventually printed in color, containing Russ Manning's Tarzan newspaper comic strip pages in color and the daily strips. It went to monthly publication in 1970 and then back to five times per year. It ceased publication with issue #89 in late 1976. However a special issue #90 was released in June 1978.

== Successor titles ==
Cazedessus renewed his publishing efforts with The Fantasy Collector (later The Fantastic Collector) in December 1988. The Fantasy Collector had been an ad-zine, running only ads. This new The Fantasy Collector, starting with #201, reprinted fiction. It was renamed The Fantastic Collector with #227.

He soon re-incorporated ERB-dom-type articles into the magazine, which was tending more towards pulp fiction in general (not just fantasy). With #248 it was double named/numbered with ERB-dom #90. This continued until Fantastic Collector #262/ERB-dom #104.

The title was changed to Pulpdom, Son of ERB-dom by Cazedessus in 1997. It continued under that name featuring articles and illustrations on almost all the pulp authors, from Edgar Rice Burroughs to H. Bedford-Jones, et al. It "concentrates on the pre-1932 pulps, obscure authors of the 'fantastic,' and particularly Argosy, All-Story and the early Blue Book." It would end with #100 in October 2020.
