= Mike Glyer =

Science fiction journalist (born 1953)

Michael Glyer
- Born: February 16, 1953 (age 73)
- Occupations: Author, editor
- Spouse: Diana Pavlac Glyer
- Children: Sierra Glyer

Mike Glyer (born February 16, 1953) is both the editor and publisher of the long-running science fiction fan newszine File 770. He has won the Hugo Award 12 times in two categories: File 770 won the Best Fanzine Hugo in 1984, 1985, 1989, 2000, 2001, 2008, 2016 and 2018. Glyer won the Best Fan Writer Hugo in 1984, 1986, 1988, and 2016. The 1982 World Science Fiction Convention (Worldcon) committee presented Glyer a special award in 1982 for "Keeping the Fan in Fanzine Publishing."

== Career ==
Glyer has edited a number of fanzines, including the award-winning File 770. The newszine takes its name from the legendary party that ran continuously for two days in Room 770 at Nolacon, the 9th World Science Fiction Convention in 1951, that upstaged that convention and entered fannish lore as a result. File 770 is a paper fanzine that appears once or twice a year and is also available in e-form; it also has a regular daily on-line presence in the fannish blogosphere with the latest in news from around science fiction and fandom. Glyer started the fanzine in 1978 to report on clubs, conventions, fannish projects, fans, fanzines, awards, and to publish articles like "Is Your Club Dead Yet?", written in what has been described as a "no-nonsense style".

Glyer's one professional fiction sale appeared in the book Alternate Worldcons, edited by Mike Resnick. That short story, "The Men Who Corflued Mohammed," is a fannish homage to Alfred Bester's "The Men Who Murdered Mohammed."

Glyer chaired the 1996 Worldcon, L.A.con III, the 54th World Science Fiction Convention, held in Anaheim, CA. He previously co-chaired the science fiction convention Westercon 31, held in Los Angeles in 1978, that was inspired by its Baskin-Robbins-esque number to hold the first "Ice Cream Social" at a regional science fiction convention; a similar ice cream social had been held in 1969 at St. Louiscon, the 27th World Science Fiction Convention in St. Louis, MO.

Glyer has been active in LASFS, the Los Angeles Science Fantasy Society since 1970, frequently serving as club secretary. Mike was made a fan guest of honor for the first time at the 1981 DeepSouthCon in Atlanta, partly because the con committee thought his LASFS minutes were so amusing that they had to be made up. Glyer protested that funny things were happening all round him and he just wrote them down – rather like Vincent van Gogh claiming "I just paint what I see."

== Awards ==
Besides numerous nominations, File 770 won the Hugo Award for Best Fanzine in 1984, 1985, 1989, 2000, 2001, 2008, 2016 and 2018. Glyer has also won the Hugo Award for Best Fan Writer in 1984, 1986, 1988 and 2016. The 1982 World Science Fiction Convention (Worldcon) committee presented Glyer a special award in 1982 for "Keeping the Fan in Fanzine Publishing."

In 2008 both Mike Glyer and his wife Diana Pavlac Glyer were nominated for Hugo Awards: File 770 for Best Fanzine and The Company They Keep: C.S. Lewis and J.R.R. Tolkien as Writers in Community for Best Related Book.

LASFS selected Mike Glyer as the 2011 recipient of their Forry Award for Lifetime Achievement in the Field of Science Fiction. The award, named for Forrest J Ackerman, long-time fan, literary agent, and well known in science fiction fandom as "Mr. LASFS", has been presented annually since 1966. Previous winners include such eminent figures as Isaac Asimov, Leigh Brackett, Ray Bradbury, and Andre Norton.

In 2016 Glyer was a Hugo finalist and winner in the Best Fan Writer category, and File 770 was also a Hugo finalist in the Best Fanzine category. Both won the Hugo in their categories, Glyer's second double-win in the same year, the first coming in 1984.
