= Apparatchik (fanzine) =

American magazine

Apparatchik (APPAЯATCHIK), nicknamed Apak, was a science fiction fanzine by Andrew Hooper, Carl Juarez, and Victor Gonzalez. It was headquartered in Seattle, Washington. The first issue appeared in March 1994. Initially it was published weekly and became bi-weekly with #11. Then, its frequency was switched to tri-weekly with #65. It was a nominee for the 1996 Hugo Award for Best Fanzine. The final, 80th, issue was dated June 20, 1997.
