= Robert Coulson =

American novelist (1928–1999)

- Born: Robert Stratton Coulson; May 12, 1928; Sullivan, Indiana, U.S.
- Died: February 19, 1999 (aged 70)
- Occupations: Writer, filk songwriter
- Writing career
- Pen name: Thomas Stratton
- Genre: science fiction

Robert Stratton "Buck" Coulson (May 12, 1928 – February 19, 1999) was an American science fiction writer, well-known fan, filk songwriter, fanzine editor and bookseller from Indiana.

== Biography ==
He served as Secretary of the Science Fiction and Fantasy Writers of America from 1972 to 1974.

Coulson and his wife, writer and filker Juanita Coulson, edited the mimeographed fanzine Yandro, which was nominated for the Hugo Award 10 years in a row, from 1959 through 1968, and won in 1965. Yandro featured Coulson's incisive reviews of books and, especially, fanzines.

Film critic and one-time active fan Roger Ebert wrote: "Locs (letters of comment) were the currency of payment for fanzine contributors; you wrote, and in the next issue got to read about what you had written. Today I can see my name on a full-page ad for a movie with disinterest, but what Harry Warner or Buck Coulson had to say about me – well, that was important."

Buck was a regular attendee, panelist, and bookseller at several Midwest science fiction conventions, including InConJunction and Chambanacon, as well as frequently attending Capricon, DucKon, Windycon, and Wiscon. He was frequently seen wearing a skunkskin cap. Characters modelled on and named after him appear in two novels by Wilson Tucker, To the Tombaugh Station and Resurrection Days.

Outside of science fiction, he worked as a technical writer. Coulson died on February 19, 1999, following a long illness.

== Bibliography ==
Coulson's novels include But What of Earth? (1976, ISBN 0-373-72044-0) (with Piers Anthony), To Renew the Ages (1976, ISBN 0-373-72026-2), and Lazer Tag: Adventure No 1: High Spy (1987, ISBN 0-88038-515-4).

With Gene DeWeese, he wrote two novels set in science fiction fandom, Now You See It/Him/Them... (1975, ISBN 0-385-05624-9) and Charles Fort Never Mentioned Wombats (1977, ISBN 0-385-12111-3); and two Man from U.N.C.L.E novels under the pseudonym of Thomas Stratton, The Invisibility Affair and The Mind-Twisters Affair (both 1967). Thomas Stratton may be the only author to have a book accepted and the dedication rejected (the editor thought 'To my wives and child' was too risque for the intended audience).
