= Algol (fanzine) =

Algol: The Magazine About Science Fiction was published from 1963 to 1984 by Andrew Porter. The headquarters was in New York City. The name was changed to Starship in 1979. Science Fiction Chronicle, founded in 1978, was initially a "department" of Algol) and was spun off it as an independent magazine in 1979.

It won a Hugo Award for Best Fanzine in 1974, in a tie with Richard E. Geis' Science Fiction Review; and received five other nominations for the Hugo (1973, 1975, 1976, and 1981). Initially a two-page fanzine printed by spirit duplicator, it expanded rapidly, moving to offset covers, then adding mimeographed contents, ultimately becoming a printed publication with the 16th issue. It went to a full color cover with the 24th issue; ultimately the circulation rose to 7,000. Columnists at various times included Ted White, Richard A. Lupoff, Susan Wood, Vincent Di Fate, Robert Silverberg, Frederik Pohl, Joe Sanders, and Bhob Stewart.

Starship ended its publication with its twentieth-anniversary issue (#44, Winter/Spring 1984).
