= A. Langley Searles =

American chemist

Arthur Langley Searles (August 8, 1920 - May 7, 2009) was an American chemist, a science fiction enthusiast and bibliographer and historian of the field, from Bronxville, New York.

Searles is best known for the scholarly science fiction fanzine Fantasy Commentator, which he published and edited. Searles published twenty-eight issues of Fantasy Commentator between 1943 and 1953, then resumed publication in 1978 with number 29; the last issue appeared in 2004. It was nominated for the 1946 Hugo Award for Hugo Award for Best Fanzine. The Immortal Storm, 1954, Sam Moskowitz' pioneering history of science fiction fandom, was originally serialized in Fantasy Commentator between 1945 and 1952. It was also the venue for publication of Searles' bibliographies of topics such as "Science Fiction in Blue Book" and "Science Fiction in the Munsey Magazines". Following the 1978 revival of his journal, he published it annually until 1990 and semi-annually thereafter. This incarnation of the Commentator was noted for the series of articles which eventually became two works on the genre by Eric Leif Davin, Pioneers of Wonder: Conversations With the Founders of Science Fiction, in 1999, and Partners in Wonder: Women and the Birth of Science Fiction, 1926-1965, 2006.

Searles was a chemist and professor of chemistry, having obtained his B.A. and Ph.D. degrees from New York University, the latter in 1946. He began teaching at the College of Mount Saint Vincent in Riverdale, The Bronx in 1956, and taught there until his retirement. He married Elizabeth Dew, a librarian, in September 1946; he divorced her in 1969 and married Mary Alice McFall Becker, a former student, on July 20, 1969. He died on May 7, 2009, of prostate cancer.
