= Richard H. E. Smith II =

American software engineer

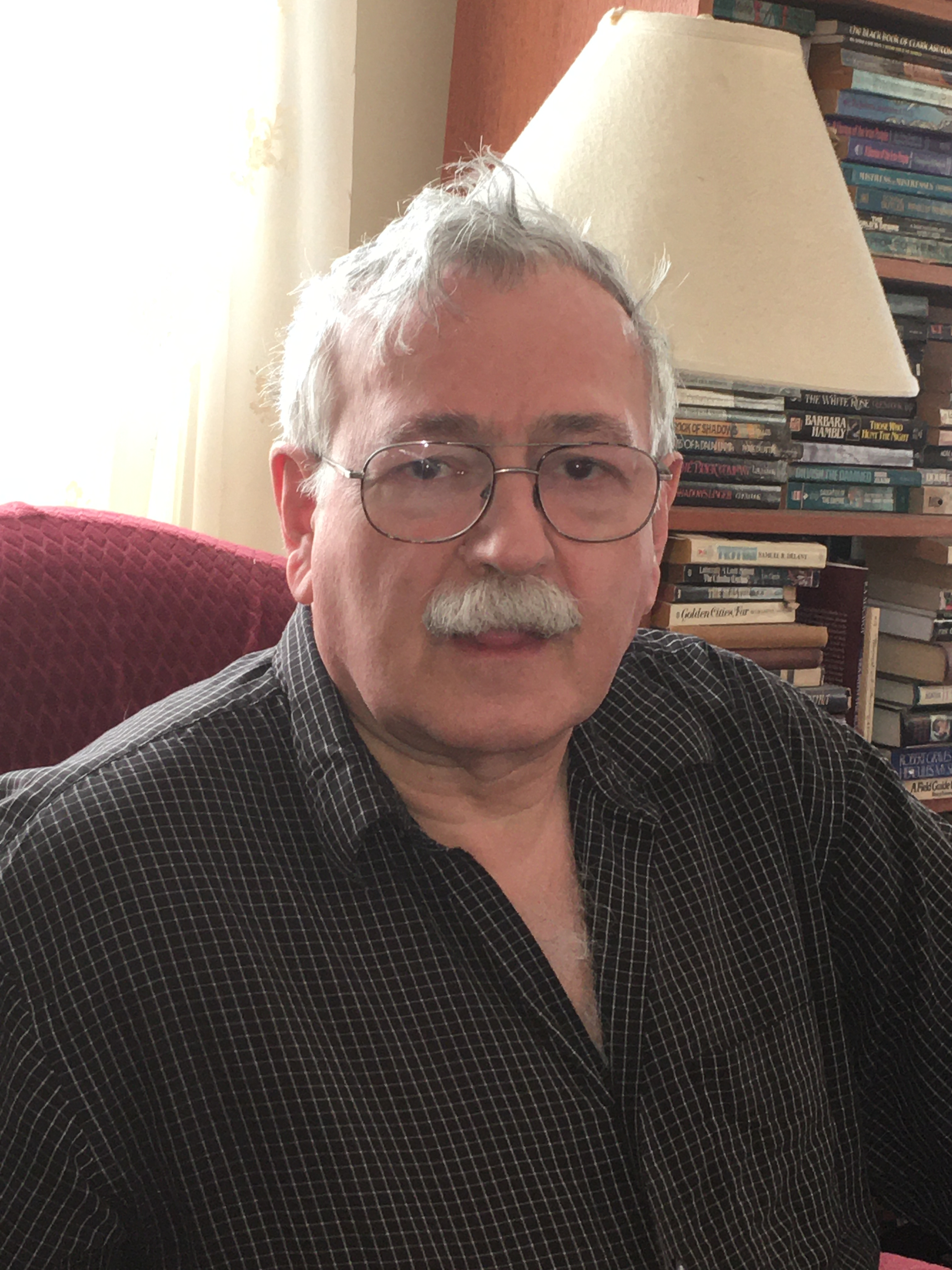
Dick Smith at February 2020 collation of MilwApa

Richard H. E. Smith II is a Chicago, Illinois- and Milwaukee, Wisconsin-based software engineer, computer consultant and a science fiction fanzine publisher.

== Science fiction fandom ==
As a science fiction fan, Smith, with his wife, Leah Zeldes Smith, was 1993 winner of the Down Under Fan Fund and delegate to Swancon 18, the Australian National Science Fiction Convention in Perth, Western Australia, as well as to fan centers throughout the country. He has been selected as fan guest of honor by numerous science fiction conventions, including Windycon (1995), ArmadilloCon (1995), First Contact (1998), ConQuesT (2000), Whatcon (1985) and Corflu (1991), and has been a toastmaster at such conventions as ConFusion and a frequent speaker and panelist on subjects related to fandom, fan publishing, science fiction and technology.

The Smiths' fanzine STET was a three-time Hugo Award nominee. In the 1980s, Smith published the Hogu Award-winning title, Uncle Dick's Little Thing. He was extensively active in numerous amateur press associations during the 1970s and '80s, including the Fantasy Amateur Press Association and The Cult.; he co-founded Windyapa. The Smiths are currently members of the Milwaukee-based MilwApa. Dick was a recipient of the Peter J. Vorzimer Award.

Smith and his wife organized ditto, a fanzine convention, in 1990 and 2001, and have worked on many Worldcons and other science fiction conventions, including the 2014 NASFiC and the 2015 Sasquan.

They were the U.S. agents who spearheaded bidding efforts for Aussiecon Three, and he was appointed Aussiecon's representative to the World Science Fiction Society's Mark Protection Committee. Smith is a member of the Los Angeles Science Fantasy Society, the Cincinnati Fantasy Group and General Technics.

Smith is known within fandom for his interest in and collection of antique printing techniques and devices, such as hectographs, letterpresses, spirit duplicators, mimeographs and obsolete computers.

== Personal and professional life ==
Smith is founder and president of Dick Smith Software, a comprehensive computer consulting and network engineering firm in the Chicago area. Prior to that, he developed software for such companies as Northrop Grumman, USRobotics and 3Com.

In his professional work, Smith contributes to science fiction, serving as a consultant to such authors as Frederik Pohl and Mike Resnick.

Smith was one of the inventors of a "Method and protocol for connecting data calls using R2 signaling" granted U.S. Patent 6,233,237 in 2001. He contributed to the textbook LAN Times Guide to Telephony (Osborne/McGraw-Hill).

=== Personal life ===
Smith was born in Milwaukee and reared in West Bend, Wisconsin, the eldest of the three sons of Richard H. E. Smith and Marilyn R. J. Smith. He graduated from the University of Wisconsin.

He has been married to Leah Zeldes Smith since 1985; an incident at their wedding inspired Mike Resnick's novel The Dark Lady.
