= File 770 =

American science fiction fanzine

- Editor: Mike Glyer
- Frequency: Daily (online)
- Format: Blog
- Founder: Mike Glyer
- First issue: 1978; 48 years ago
- Country: United States
- Language: English
- Website: file770.com

File 770 is a long-running science-fiction fanzine, newszine, and blog site published and administered by Mike Glyer. It has been published every year since 1978, and has won a record eight Hugo Awards for Best Fanzine, with the first win in 1984 and the latest in 2018. (Note: This is a joint record shared with Locus magazine.)

File 770 is named after a legendary room party held in Room 770 at Nolacon, the 9th World Science Fiction Convention, in New Orleans in 1951. (Note: Harry Warner Jr. writes: "This was a St. Charles Hotel room registered to fans Max Keasler, Roger Sims, Rich Elsberry and Ed Kuss at the 9th Worldcon -- nicknamed NOLacon -- held in New Orleans in 1951. Frank Dietz had been hosting a room party which was asked to quiet down by a hotel detective, and Dietz resolved the matter by taking everyone to room 770 circa 11:00 PM Saturday night, whereupon a massive party developed which lasted till 11:00 AM the next morning. [...] Time has transformed the room 770 party into an iconic fannish emblem, but the truth is it did have a pervasive impact on fandom right from the beginning, it was an instant legend in the making. [...] Room 770 played a part in the philosophy and orientation of a substantial part of fandom for years thereafter". So much so that Mike Glyer chose it as the title for his newszine, presumably because it strikes the right note of fannish fun".) Glyer started File 770 in 1978 as a mimeographed print fanzine to report on fan clubs, conventions, fannish projects, fans, fanzines and SF awards. In the 1990s, Glyer moved production of the fanzine to computer desktop publishing, and in January 2008, he began publishing File 770 as a blog on the internet.

A print version of File 770 was produced until 2016. eFanzines.com began hosting PDF versions of the paper issues in 2005.

== Awards ==
File 770 has won the Hugo Award for Best Fanzine eight times, in 1984, 1985, 1989, 2000, 2001, 2008, 2016, and 2018. It has received a total of thirty-one nominations over four decades. Glyer himself has also won the Hugo Award for Best Fan Writer four times for his work on File 770. Writing in The Encyclopedia of Science Fiction, Rob Hansen and David Langford described the zine as evoking a strong feeling of community.

Hugo Award for Best Fanzine: File 770

1980s
Year	Result
1980	Nominated
1981	Nominated
1982	Nominated
1983	Nominated
1984	Won
1985	Won
1986	—
1987	Nominated
1988	Nominated
1989	Won

1990s
Year	Result
1990	Nominated
1991	Nominated
1992	Nominated
1993	Nominated
1994	Nominated
1995	Nominated
1996	—
1997	Nominated
1998	Nominated
1999	Nominated

2000s
Year	Result
2000	Won
2001	Won
2002	Nominated
2003	Nominated
2004	Nominated
2005	—
2006	Nominated
2007	—
2008	Won
2009	Nominated

2010s
Year	Result
2010	Nominated
2011	Nominated
2012	Nominated
2013	—
2014	—
2015	—
2016	Won
2017	—
2018	Won

In his 2018 Hugo acceptance speech, Glyer recused himself and File 770 from future nominations. The next year, File 770 received enough votes to qualify for the Hugo ballot, but it was not listed due to the recusal.
