= Mimosa (magazine) =

Defunct science fiction fanzine

Dan Steffan cover illustration for Mimosa 16: "Dan's Satyr" (1994)

Mimosa was a science fiction fanzine edited by Richard Lynch and Nicki Lynch. It won six Hugo Awards for Best Fanzine (in 1992, 1993, 1994, 1997, 1998 and 2003) and was nominated a total of 14 times (1991-2004). The headquarters was in Gaithersburg, Maryland.

Published from 1982 until 2003, Mimosa focused on discussions of the history and impact of science fiction fandom. Contributors included Forrest J Ackerman, Ron Bennett, John Berry, Vin¢ Clarke, Sharon N. Farber, Dave Kyle, Mike Resnick, Bob Shaw, Harry Warner, Jr., Ted White and Walt Willis.

== Illustrators ==
The cartoonists and illustrators who contributed to Mimosa included Sheryl Birkhead, Kurt Erichsen, Debbie Hughes, Julia Morgan-Scott, Peggy Ranson, Stu Shiffman, Dan Steffan, Steve Stiles, Charlie Williams and Kip Williams. Covers by Hugo Award for Best Fan Artist winners included Brad W. Foster, Ian Gunn, Teddy Harvia and Joe Mayhew.

Issues 1-16 were produced via mimeograph, while issues 17-30 were printed commercially. The two-volume A Mimosa Fanthology collected the best from the first 27 issues.

The last article in the final issue (#30) of Mimosa (August 2003), "Footprints in the Sand" by Michael A. Burstein, is one of several articles published during the late 1990s and early 2000s pondering the possibility of science fiction fandom's eventual death.
