= Andrew I. Porter =

American science fiction editor

Andrew Porter with the Best Semiprozine Hugo Award at the 1993 Worldcon

Andrew Ian Porter (born March 24, 1946) is an American editor, publisher and active science fiction fan.

== Background ==
Born Andrew Ian Silverberg on March 24, 1946, in Detroit, Michigan, he moved to New York City with his mother and brother in 1956 upon the death of his father the previous year. His name was legally changed in 1964 when his mother remarried. He was a student at Milford Academy, which at the time was operating as a boys' prep school.

== Fandom ==
Porter entered science fiction fandom in 1960. He had been calling science fiction writers in the Bronx and Manhattan telephone books to discuss science fiction, and Donald Wollheim put him in touch with local science fiction fandom in New York City. He became active in fan groups including the Lunarians, FISTFA (the Fannish Insurgent, Scientifiction Association) and the Fanoclasts, then hosted by Ted White. In 1960 he had his first news-related column on upcoming paperbacks, printed in James V. Taurasi's Science Fiction Times.

He published many different fanzines, beginning with Algol, including the newszine S.F.Weekly from 1966 to 1968. He started his semiprozine Science Fiction Chronicle in 1979. He has attended hundreds of science fiction conventions and nearly 40 World Science Fiction Conventions (Worldcons) since his first in 1963. He worked on conventions in the US, Canada and overseas, and was on the central committee of the 1967 Worldcon, NYCon 3. With John Bangsund, he was responsible for Australia hosting its first Worldcon. He was Fan Guest of Honor at several conventions, most notably the 1990 Worldcon, ConFiction. He won the fanzine Hugo in 1974 for his fanzine/semiprozine Algol (later renamed Starship), and the semiprozine Hugo in 1993 and 1994 for Science Fiction Chronicle. He has a total of twenty-three additional nominations for Best Fanzine or Best Semipro Zine. In 1991, he received a Special Committee Award at the Worldcon, for Distinguished Semiprozine Work; in 1992 he received a Special British Fantasy Award. He sold Science Fiction Chronicle to DNA Publications in May 2000 and was fired in 2002. In 2006, he was diagnosed with liver bile duct cancer, for which he was operated on successfully in 2007, followed by five months of chemotherapy. He is now cancer free. At the 2009 Worldcon in Montreal, Anticipation, he received the Big Heart Award. In 2010, he finally realized his dream of going to an Australian WorldCon, AussieCon IV.

== Professional work ==
In publishing, he was a proofreader and copy editor, was assistant editor on The Magazine of Fantasy & Science Fiction from 1966 to 1974, associate editor at the paperback publisher Lancer Books in the late 1960s, and was a trade magazine editor and advertising production manager on such titles as Rudder, Quick Frozen Foods (under editor Sam Moskowitz), QFF International, Construction Equipment, and Electro-Procurement. He was editor/designer/publisher of The Book of Ellison, a hardcover/trade paperback published to honor Harlan Ellison’s 1978 stint as Worldcon Pro Guest of Honor. His other publications, under the Algol Press imprint, are Dreams Must Explain Themselves by Ursula K. Le Guin, Exploring Cordwainer Smith, Experiment Perilous: The Art and Science of Anguish In Science Fiction (with essays by Marion Zimmer Bradley, Alfred Bester and Norman Spinrad), and The Fiction of James Tiptree, Jr. by Gardner Dozois. He has sold articles and photos to Publishers Weekly, Omni, and The New York Times. He is a New York City resident.

== Sources ==
- The Encyclopedia of Science Fiction page 949
