= Camille Cazedessus Jr. =

American editor and publisher

Camille Cazedessus II
- Born: December 8, 1938 (age 86); Baton Rouge, Louisiana

Camille Cazedessus II (born December 8, 1938), also known as "Caz", is an American editor and publisher. Known for his works about Edgar Rice Burroughs and pulp fiction, he has published over 250 periodicals on the topics since 1960 under the titles ERB-dom, The Fantasy Collector and, since 1997, Pulpdom. He has also written about Kit Carson and taught Western history.

== Biography ==
=== Early life ===
Cazedessus was born December 8, 1938, in Baton Rouge, Louisiana, the only child of engineer Camille Cazedessus. He graduated from Baton Rouge High School in 1957 and Spring Hill College in 1961. He also attended Louisiana State University in Baton Rouge, Louisiana, and New Mexico Highlands College in Las Vegas, New Mexico, and Fort Lewis College, in each case studying American and South West history.

=== Career ===
Cazedessus organized and led the first teenage rock and roll band in Baton Rouge, Louisiana, in the autumn of 1956: The Dots. He was lead singer and rhythm guitar until the autumn of 1957, when he relinquished the band to Lenny Capella and enrolled in Spring Hill College, Mobile, Alabama.

Later, as fans of the works of Edgar Rice Burroughs, Cazedessus and Alfred Guillory Jr. launched the fanzine ERB-dom in May, 1960. Following Guillory's death the following year, Caz became the magazine's sole editor and publisher. ERB-dom was nominated for the Hugo Award for Best Fanzine in 1964 and 1966, winning the award in 1966. ERB-dom went monthly in January 1970 with full color covers. In 1974 it returned to less frequent publication, and the "final" issue, no. 89, was published in November 1976.

In December 1988, Caz revived his old ad-zine, The Fantasy Collector in Dec 1988 with #201, now reprinting fiction. It retitled as The Fantastic Collector with #228 (March 1991). It would later incorporate ERB-dom in December 1993, with each issue being double named & numbered ("Fantastic Collector #248/ERB-dom #90), and in January 1997 changed the name to Pulpdom, which continued for 75 issues, the last in August 2013. All these issues of The Fantasy Collector and Pulpdom contain illustrated articles on pulp magazines, and reviews of and fiction by popular authors of the early 20th century. Ultimately, Pulpdom Online was inaugurated in December, 2013 with a new number one until it returned to the original number with the last two issues in 2020: #99 and #100.

During the 1960s and 1970s, Cazedessus published books as Opar Press. After living in Taos, New Mexico, during the 1980s, he began publishing books as Rendezvous Books. He continues to publish and write while living part-time in Chimney Rock, Colorado.

Cazedessus has written several books about Kit Carson and others are underway.

In May 2010, Caz's old band, The Dots, was inducted into the Louisiana Music Hall of Fame by the State of Louisiana, authorized by the governor, Bobby Jindal.

== Works ==
- (publisher) The Literature of Burroughsiana (1963), John Harwood
- (publisher) Tarzan, Lord of the Jungle (1968), Edgar Rice Burroughs, illus. Burne Hogarth
- (publisher) Frank Frazetta Portfolio (1968)
- A Review of Dell's Early Tarzan, 1948-1953 (1971)
- (publisher) The Hero-Pulp Index (1971), Lohr McKinstry and Robert Weinberg
- (publisher) The Weird Menace (1972), Robert K. Jones
- (publisher) Ghost Stories (1973), Sam Moskowitz & James R. Seiger
- (publisher) Zdeněk Burian Portfolio (1976)
- (publisher) Roy Krenkel Portfolio (1979)
- Mountain Men : An Informal Bibliography (1981)
- The Rough Riders and New Mexico (1994)
- Teddy Roosevelt and the Rough Riders : A Hundred Years of Glory, 1898-1998 (1994)
- (editor) Abiquiu, Chama And Pagosa Springs - 1859 (2000), John N. Macomb and J.S. Newberry
- Meet Kit Carson (2006)
- The UNreal Kit Carson (2006)
- Old Pagosa, Views from the Past (2007)
- Kit Carson, Hero of the Backwoods (2009)

Serial publications:

- Voyage (1976-?)
- Pulpdom, ERB-dom & The Fantasy Collector (1960–2020) (OCLC 37862745)

== Awards ==
- 1966: Hugo Award for Best Fanzine (for ERB-dom)
- Honorary Member of the"Edgar Rice Burroughs Amateur Press Association". Archived from the original on 2009-10-27.
