= Lan's Lantern =

Former science fiction fanzine

Lan's Lantern was a science fiction fanzine edited by George "Lan" Laskowski. It was nominated for the Hugo Award for Best Fanzine from 1986 through 1996, winning in 1986 and 1991. It is called an appreciation zine because it specialized in issues celebrating a single science fiction author, such as issue #11 on Clifford D. Simak or issue #9 about the writings of Jack Williamson which appeared in Amazing Stories in the early 1950s. Issues ranged from 30 to 120 pages. The first was published in April 1976 and the last (#47) in December 1998. Mike Resnick wrote in 2002:

"Lan's Lantern not only runs the best articles and most thoughtful reviews of any fanzine around, but also has become the Rand McNally of the fannish community."

Laskowski died in 1999 and a memorial website was launched by the Science Fiction and Fantasy Writers of America.
