= Hugo Award for Best Fanzine =

Annual award for science fiction or fantasy

- Awarded for: The best non-professional magazine devoted primarily to science fiction or fantasy
- Presented by: World Science Fiction Society
- First award: 1955
- Most recent winner: nerds of a feather, flock together (Roseanna Pendlebury, Arturo Serrano, Paul Weimer; senior editors Joe Sherry, G. Brown, Vance Kotrla)
- Website: thehugoawards.org

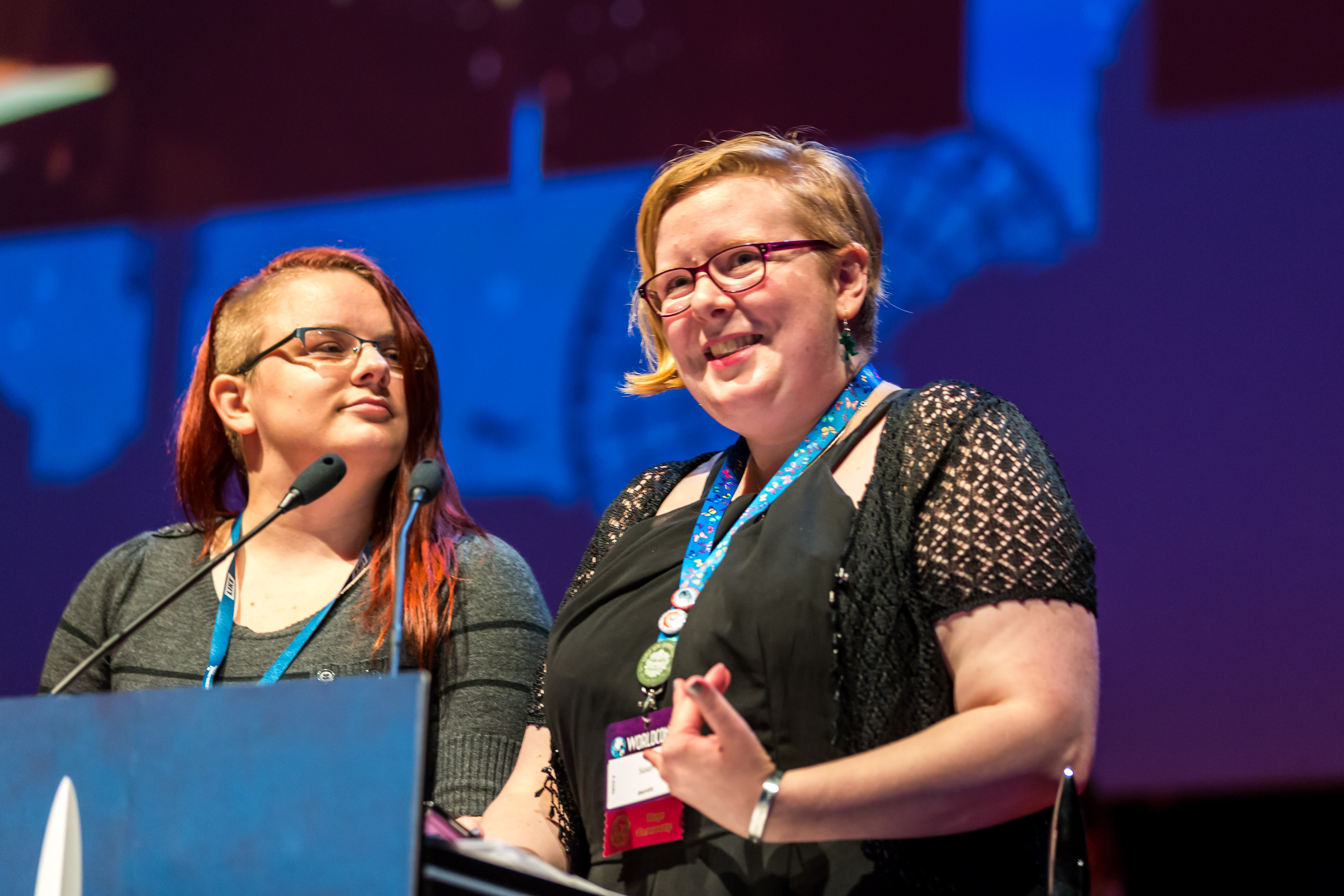
Ira and Susan accepting the 2017 Hugo Award for Best Fanzine for Lady Business

The Hugo Award for Best Fanzine is given each year for non professionally edited magazines, or "fanzines", related to science fiction or fantasy which has published four or more issues with at least one issue appearing in the previous calendar year. Awards were also once given out for professional magazines in the professional magazine category, and since 1984 have been awarded for semi-professional magazines in the semiprozine category; several magazines that were finalist in or won the fanzine category have gone on to be finalists in or win the semiprozine category since it was established. The Hugo Awards have been described as "a fine showcase for speculative fiction" and "the best known literary award for science fiction writing".

The award was first presented in 1955, and has been given annually since except for in 1958. A "fanzine" is defined for the award as a magazine that does not meet the Hugo award's criteria for a professional or semi-professional magazine. Specifically, it must meet less than two of the five Hugo criteria for consideration as a semiprozine: that the magazine had an average press run of at least one thousand copies per issue, paid its contributors and/or staff in other than copies of the publication, provided at least half the income of any one person, had at least fifteen percent of its total space occupied by advertising, and announced itself to be a semiprozine. This is the oldest long-running Hugo award for fan activity; in 1967 Hugo Awards were added specifically for fan writing and fan art. In addition to the regular Hugo awards, between 1996 and 2025, Retrospective Hugo Awards or "Retro-Hugos" were available for works published 50, 75, or 100 years prior. Retro-Hugos could only be awarded for years after 1939 in which no awards were originally given. Retro-Hugo awards were awarded for 1939, 1941, 1943–1946, 1951, and 1954, and the fanzine category was included each year.

During the 79 nomination years, including Retro Hugo years, 144 magazines run by hundreds of editors have been finalists. Of these, 45 magazines have won, including ties. File 770 and Locus have each won 8 times, the most wins of any magazine. File 770 also holds the record for most final ballot nominations at 31; Locus has been a finalist 13 times. Mimosa has won 6 of 14 nominations, Ansible has won 5 out of 11, Science Fiction Review has won 4 of 12, and nerds of a feather, flock together has won 3 of 8; they are the only other magazines to win more than twice. Challenger has the most nominations without winning at 12; the next highest is FOSFAX with 7. As editor of Locus Charles N. Brown has won 8 of 13 nominations, though he shared 8 of those awards with Dena Brown. Richard E. Geis has won 6 of 15 nominations for his work on Science Fiction Review, Psychotic, and The Alien Critic; Mike Glyer has won 8 of 31 for editing File 770; David Langford has won 5 of 12 for work on Ansible and Twil-Ddu; and Richard Lynch and Nicki Lynch have both won 6 of 14 nominations for Mimosa; Christopher J Garcia has been nominated 18 times for both The Drink Tank and Journey Planet, winning once for each, with James Bacon appearing on 15 of those nominations. Guy H. Lillian III has the most nominations without winning at 12 for Challenger.

== Selection ==
Hugo Award nominees and winners are chosen by supporting or attending members of the annual World Science Fiction Convention (Worldcon), and the presentation evening constitutes its central event. The selection process is defined in the World Science Fiction Society Constitution as instant-runoff voting with six finalists, except in the case of a tie. The works on the ballot are the six most-nominated by members that year, with no limit on the number of works that can be nominated. The 1955 and 1956 awards did not include any recognition of runner-up magazines, but since 1957 all of the candidates were recorded. Initial nominations are made by members in January through March, while voting on the ballot of six finalists is performed roughly in April through July, subject to change depending on when that year's Worldcon is held. Prior to 2017, the final ballot was five works; it was changed that year to six, with each initial nominator limited to five nominations. Worldcons are generally held near the start of September, and are held in a different city around the world each year.

== Winners and finalists ==
In the following table, the years correspond to the date of the ceremony, rather than when the work was first published. Each date links to the "year in literature" article corresponding with when the work was eligible. Entries with a yellow background won the award for that year; those with a gray background are the other finalists on the short-list.

Note that six magazines are listed under multiple names: Psychotic was later renamed to Science Fiction Review, Zenith was renamed to Zenith Speculation and later to Speculation, Algol was renamed to Starship, Tangent was renamed to Tangent Online when it switched from a print magazine to an online one, and Cry of the Nameless, a club bulletin for "The Nameless Ones", was renamed to Cry when it began publishing more general material. No other magazines have been a finalist under multiple names. Those magazines are sorted under the first name they were nominated as.

* Winners and joint winners

Winners and finalists
Year	Work	Editor(s)	Ref.
1955	Fantasy-Times*	James V. Taurasi, Sr. and Ray Van Houten	
1956	Inside*	Ron Smith	
1956	Science Fiction Advertiser*	Ron Smith	
1956	A Bas	Boyd Raeburn	
1956	Fantasy-Times	James V. Taurasi, Sr. and Ray Van Houten	
1956	Grue	Dean Grennell	
1956	Hyphen	Walt Willis and Chuck Harris	
1956	Oblique	Cliff Gould	
1956	Peon	Charles Lee Riddle	
1956	Psychotic	Richard E. Geis	
1956	Sky Hook	Redd Boggs	
1957	Science-Fiction Times*	James V. Taurasi, Sr., Ray Van Houten and Frank R. Prieto Jr.	
1957	Hyphen	Walt Willis and Chuck Harris	
1957	Inside	Ron Smith	
1959	Fanac*	Terry Carr and Ron Ellik	
1959	Cry of the Nameless	F. M. Busby, Elinor Busby, Burnett Toskey and Wally Weber	
1959	Hyphen	Walt Willis and Chuck Harris	
1959	JD-Argassy	Lynn A. Hickman	
1959	Science-Fiction Times	James V. Taurasi, Sr., Ray Van Houten and Frank R. Prieto Jr.	
1959	Yandro	Robert Coulson and Juanita Coulson	
1960	Cry of the Nameless*	F. M. Busby, Elinor Busby, Burnett Toskey and Wally Weber	
1960	Fanac	Terry Carr and Ron Ellik	
1960	JD-Argassy	Lynn A. Hickman	
1960	Science-Fiction Times	James V. Taurasi, Sr., Ray Van Houten and Frank R. Prieto Jr.	
1960	Yandro	Robert Coulson and Juanita Coulson	
1961	Who Killed Science Fiction?*	Earl Kemp	
1961	Discord	Redd Boggs	
1961	Fanac	Terry Carr and Ron Ellik	
1961	Habakkuk	Bill Donaho	
1961	Shangri L'Affaires	Bjo Trimble and John Trimble	
1961	Yandro	Robert Coulson and Juanita Coulson	
1962	Warhoon*	Richard Bergeron	
1962	Amra	George H. Scithers	
1962	Axe	Larry T. Shaw and Noreen Shaw	
1962	Cry	F. M. Busby, Elinor Busby, and Wally Weber	
1962	Yandro	Robert Coulson and Juanita Coulson	
1963	Xero*	Richard A. Lupoff and Pat Lupoff	
1963	Mirage	Jack L. Chalker	
1963	Shangri L'Affaires	Fred Patten, Albert Lewis, Bjo Trimble, and John Trimble	
1963	Warhoon	Richard Bergeron	
1963	Yandro	Robert Coulson and Juanita Coulson	
1964	Amra*	George H. Scithers	
1964	ERB-dom	Camille Cazedessus, Jr.	
1964	Starspinkle	Ron Ellik	
1964	Yandro	Robert Coulson and Juanita Coulson	
1965	Yandro*	Robert Coulson and Juanita Coulson	
1965	Double: Bill	Bill Bowers and Bill Mallardi	
1965	Zenith	Peter Weston	
1966	ERB-dom*	Camille Cazedessus, Jr.	
1966	Double: Bill	Bill Bowers and Bill Mallardi	
1966	Niekas	Edmund R. Meskys and Felice Rolfe	
1966	Yandro	Robert Coulson and Juanita Coulson	
1966	Zenith Speculation	Peter Weston	
1967	Niekas*	Edmund R. Meskys and Felice Rolfe	
1967	Australian SF Review	John Bangsund	
1967	Lighthouse	Terry Carr	
1967	Habakkuk	Bill Donaho	
1967	Riverside Quarterly	Leland Sapiro	
1967	Trumpet	Tom Reamy	
1967	Yandro	Robert Coulson and Juanita Coulson	
1968	Amra*	George H. Scithers	
1968	Australian SF Review	John Bangsund	
1968	Lighthouse	Terry Carr	
1968	ODD	Raymond Fisher	
1968	Psychotic	Richard E. Geis	
1968	Yandro	Robert Coulson and Juanita Coulson	
1969	Science Fiction Review*	Richard E. Geis	
1969	Riverside Quarterly	Leland Sapiro	
1969	Shangri L'Affaires	Ken Rudolph	
1969	Trumpet	Tom Reamy	
1969	Warhoon	Richard Bergeron	
1970	Science Fiction Review*	Richard E. Geis	
1970	BeABohema	Frank Lunney	
1970	Locus	Charles N. Brown	
1970	Riverside Quarterly	Leland Sapiro	
1970	Speculation	Peter Weston	
1971	Locus*	Charles N. Brown and Dena Brown	
1971	Energumen	Michael Glicksohn and Susan Wood Glicksohn	
1971	Outworlds	Bill Bowers and Joan Bowers	
1971	Science Fiction Review	Richard E. Geis	
1971	Speculation	Peter Weston	
1972	Locus*	Charles N. Brown and Dena Brown	
1972	Energumen	Michael Glicksohn and Susan Wood Glicksohn	
1972	Granfalloon	Ron Bushyager and Linda Bushyager	
1972	SF Commentary	Bruce Gillespie	
1973	Energumen*	Michael Glicksohn and Susan Wood Glicksohn	
1973	Algol	Andrew I. Porter	
1973	Granfalloon	Ron Bushyager and Linda Bushyager	
1973	Locus	Charles N. Brown and Dena Brown	
1973	SF Commentary	Bruce Gillespie	
1974	The Alien Critic*	Richard E. Geis	
1974	Algol*	Andrew I. Porter	
1974	Locus	Charles N. Brown and Dena Brown	
1974	Outworlds	Bill Bowers and Joan Bowers	
1975	The Alien Critic*	Richard E. Geis	
1975	Algol	Andrew I. Porter	
1975	Locus	Charles N. Brown and Dena Brown	
1975	Outworlds	Bill Bowers and Joan Bowers	
1975	SF Commentary	Bruce Gillespie	
1975	Starling	Hank Luttrell and Lesleigh Luttrell	
1976	Locus*	Charles N. Brown and Dena Brown	
1976	Algol	Andrew I. Porter	
1976	Don-O-Saur	Don C. Thompson	
1976	Outworlds	Bill Bowers	
1976	Science Fiction Review	Richard E. Geis	
1977	Science Fiction Review*	Richard E. Geis	
1977	Locus	Charles N. Brown and Dena Brown	
1977	Mythologies	Don D'Ammassa	
1977	Outworlds	Bill Bowers	
1977	The Spanish Inquisition	Suzanne Tompkins and Jerry Kaufman	
1978	Locus*	Charles N. Brown and Dena Brown	
1978	Don-O-Saur	Don C. Thompson	
1978	Janus	Janice Bogstad and Jeanne Gomoll	
1978	Maya	Rob Jackson	
1978	Science Fiction Review	Richard E. Geis	
1979	Science Fiction Review*	Richard E. Geis	
1979	Janus	Janice Bogstad and Jeanne Gomoll	
1979	Maya	Rob Jackson	
1979	Mota	Terry Hughes	
1979	Twll-Ddu	David Langford	
1980	Locus*	Charles N. Brown	
1980	File 770	Mike Glyer	
1980	Janus	Janice Bogstad and Jeanne Gomoll	
1980	Science Fiction Review	Richard E. Geis	
1980	Thrust	Doug Fratz	
1981	Locus*	Charles N. Brown	
1981	File 770	Mike Glyer	
1981	Science Fiction Chronicle	Andrew I. Porter	
1981	Science Fiction Review	Richard E. Geis	
1981	Starship	Andrew I. Porter	
1982	Locus*	Charles N. Brown	
1982	File 770	Mike Glyer	
1982	Science Fiction Chronicle	Andrew I. Porter	
1982	Science Fiction Review	Richard E. Geis	
1983	Locus*	Charles N. Brown	
1983	Fantasy Newsletter	Robert A. Collins	
1983	File 770	Mike Glyer	
1983	Science Fiction Chronicle	Andrew I. Porter	
1983	Science Fiction Review	Richard E. Geis	
1984	File 770*	Mike Glyer	
1984	Ansible	David Langford	
1984	Holier Than Thou	Marty Cantor and Robbie Cantor	
1984	Izzard	Patrick Nielsen Hayden and Teresa Nielsen Hayden	
1984	The Philk Fee-Nom-Ee-Non	Paul J. Willett	
1985	File 770*	Mike Glyer	
1985	Ansible	David Langford	
1985	Holier Than Thou	Marty Cantor and Robbie Cantor	
1985	Mythologies	Don D'Ammassa	
1985	Rataplan	Leigh Edmonds	
1986	Lan's Lantern*	George "Lan" Laskowski	
1986	Anvil	Charlotte Proctor	
1986	Greater Columbia Fantasy Costumers Guild Newsletter	Bobby Gear	
1986	Holier Than Thou	Marty Cantor and Robbie Cantor	
1986	Universal Translator	Susan Bridges	
1987	Ansible*	David Langford	
1987	File 770	Mike Glyer	
1987	Lan's Lantern	George "Lan" Laskowski	
1987	Texas SF Inquirer	Pat Mueller	
1987	Trap Door	Robert Lichtman	
1988	Texas SF Inquirer*	Pat Mueller	
1988	File 770	Mike Glyer	
1988	FOSFAX	Timothy Lane	
1988	Lan's Lantern	George "Lan" Laskowski	
1988	The Mad 3 Party	Leslie Turek	
1989	File 770*	Mike Glyer	
1989	FOSFAX	Timothy Lane	
1989	Lan's Lantern	George "Lan" Laskowski	
1989	Niekas	Edmund R. Meskys	
1989	OtherRealms	Chuq Von Rospach	
1990	The Mad 3 Party*	Leslie Turek	
1990	File 770	Mike Glyer	
1990	FOSFAX	Timothy Lane	
1990	Lan's Lantern	George "Lan" Laskowski	
1990	Pirate Jenny	Pat Mueller	
1991	Lan's Lantern*	George "Lan" Laskowski	
1991	File 770	Mike Glyer	
1991	FOSFAX	Timothy Lane and Janice Moore	
1991	Mainstream	Jerry Kaufman and Suzanne Tompkins	
1991	Mimosa	Richard Lynch and Nicki Lynch	
1992	Mimosa*	Richard Lynch and Nicki Lynch	
1992	File 770	Mike Glyer	
1992	FOSFAX	Timothy Lane and Janice Moore	
1992	Lan's Lantern	George "Lan" Laskowski	
1992	Trap Door	Robert Lichtman	
1993	Mimosa*	Richard Lynch and Nicki Lynch	
1993	File 770	Mike Glyer	
1993	FOSFAX	Timothy Lane and Janice Moore	
1993	Lan's Lantern	George "Lan" Laskowski	
1993	STET	Leah Zeldes Smith and Dick Smith	
1994	Mimosa*	Richard Lynch and Nicki Lynch	
1994	Ansible	David Langford	
1994	File 770	Mike Glyer	
1994	Lan's Lantern	George "Lan" Laskowski	
1994	STET	Leah Zeldes Smith and Dick Smith	
1995	Ansible*	David Langford	
1995	File 770	Mike Glyer	
1995	Habakkuk	Bill Donaho	
1995	Lan's Lantern	George "Lan" Laskowski	
1995	Mimosa	Richard Lynch and Nicki Lynch	
1996	Ansible*	David Langford	
1996	Apparatchik	Andrew Hooper and Victor Gonzalez	
1996	Attitude	Michael Abbott, John Dallman, and Pam Wells	
1996	FOSFAX	Timothy Lane and Elizabeth Garrott	
1996	Lan's Lantern	George "Lan" Laskowski	
1996	Mimosa	Richard Lynch and Nicki Lynch	
1997	Mimosa*	Richard Lynch and Nicki Lynch	
1997	Ansible	David Langford	
1997	File 770	Mike Glyer	
1997	Nova Express	Lawrence Person	
1997	Tangent	David Truesdale	
1998	Mimosa*	Richard Lynch and Nicki Lynch	
1998	Ansible	David Langford	
1998	Attitude	Michael Abbott, John Dallman, and Pam Wells	
1998	File 770	Mike Glyer	
1998	Tangent	David Truesdale	
1999	Ansible*	David Langford	
1999	File 770	Mike Glyer	
1999	Mimosa	Richard Lynch and Nicki Lynch	
1999	Plokta	Alison Scott, Steve Davies, and Mike Scott	
1999	Tangent	David Truesdale	
1999	Thyme	Alan Stewart	
2000	File 770*	Mike Glyer	
2000	Ansible	David Langford	
2000	Challenger	Guy H. Lillian III	
2000	Mimosa	Richard Lynch and Nicki Lynch	
2000	Plokta	Alison Scott, Steve Davies, and Mike Scott	
2001	File 770*	Mike Glyer	
2001	Challenger	Guy H. Lillian III	
2001	Mimosa	Richard Lynch and Nicki Lynch	
2001	Plokta	Alison Scott, Steve Davies, and Mike Scott	
2001	STET	Leah Zeldes Smith and Dick Smith	
2002	Ansible*	David Langford	
2002	Challenger	Guy H. Lillian III	
2002	File 770	Mike Glyer	
2002	Mimosa	Richard Lynch and Nicki Lynch	
2002	Plokta	Alison Scott, Steve Davies, and Mike Scott	
2003	Mimosa*	Richard Lynch and Nicki Lynch	
2003	Challenger	Guy H. Lillian III	
2003	Emerald City	Cheryl Morgan	
2003	File 770	Mike Glyer	
2003	Plokta	Alison Scott, Steve Davies, and Mike Scott	
2004	Emerald City*	Cheryl Morgan	
2004	Challenger	Guy H. Lillian III	
2004	File 770	Mike Glyer	
2004	Mimosa	Richard Lynch and Nicki Lynch	
2004	Plokta	Alison Scott, Steve Davies, and Mike Scott	
2005	Plokta*	Alison Scott, Steve Davies, and Mike Scott	
2005	Banana Wings	Claire Brialey and Mark Plummer	
2005	Challenger	Guy H. Lillian III	
2005	Chunga	Randy Byers, Andy Hooper, and Carl Juarez	
2005	Emerald City	Cheryl Morgan	
2006	Plokta*	Alison Scott, Steve Davies, and Mike Scott	
2006	Banana Wings	Claire Brialey and Mark Plummer	
2006	Challenger	Guy H. Lillian III	
2006	Chunga	Randy Byers, Andy Hooper, and Carl Juarez	
2006	File 770	Mike Glyer	
2007	Science-Fiction Five-Yearly*	Lee Hoffman, Geri Sullivan, and Randy Byers	
2007	Banana Wings	Claire Brialey and Mark Plummer	
2007	Challenger	Guy H. Lillian III	
2007	The Drink Tank	Christopher Garcia	
2007	Plokta	Alison Scott, Steve Davies, and Mike Scott	
2008	File 770*	Mike Glyer	
2008	Argentus	Steven H Silver	
2008	Challenger	Guy H. Lillian III	
2008	The Drink Tank	Christopher Garcia	
2008	Plokta	Alison Scott, Steve Davies, and Mike Scott	
2009	Electric Velocipede*	John Klima	
2009	Argentus	Steven H Silver	
2009	Banana Wings	Claire Brialey and Mark Plummer	
2009	Challenger	Guy H. Lillian III	
2009	The Drink Tank	Christopher Garcia	
2009	File 770	Mike Glyer	
2010	StarShipSofa*	Tony C. Smith	
2010	Argentus	Steven H Silver	
2010	Banana Wings	Claire Brialey and Mark Plummer	
2010	Challenger	Guy H. Lillian III	
2010	The Drink Tank	Christopher Garcia and James Bacon	
2010	File 770	Mike Glyer	
2011	The Drink Tank*	Christopher Garcia and James Bacon	
2011	Banana Wings	Claire Brialey and Mark Plummer	
2011	Challenger	Guy H. Lillian III	
2011	File 770	Mike Glyer	
2011	StarShipSofa	Tony C. Smith	
2012	SF Signal*	John DeNardo	
2012	Banana Wings	Claire Brialey and Mark Plummer	
2012	The Drink Tank	Christopher Garcia and James Bacon	
2012	File 770	Mike Glyer	
2012	Journey Planet	James Bacon and Christopher Garcia	
2013	SF Signal*	John DeNardo, JP Frantz, and Patrick Hester	
2013	Banana Wings	Claire Brialey and Mark Plummer	
2013	The Drink Tank	Christopher Garcia and James Bacon	
2013	Elitist Book Reviews	Steven Diamond	
2013	Journey Planet	James Bacon, Christopher Garcia, Emma J. King, Helen J. Montgomery, and Pete Young	
2014	A Dribble of Ink*	Aidan Moher	
2014	The Book Smugglers	Ana Grilo and Thea James	
2014	Elitist Book Reviews	Steven Diamond	
2014	Journey Planet	James Bacon, Christopher Garcia, Lynda E. Rucker, Pete Young, Colin Harris, and Helen J. Montgomery	
2014	Pornokitsch	Anne C. Perry and Jared Shurin	
2015	Journey Planet*	James Bacon, Christopher J Garcia, Colin Harris, Alissa McKersie, and Helen J. Montgomery	
2015	Black Gate (Note: Black Gate attempted to withdraw themselves from the 2015 ballot, stating that the prevalence of nominees that year from voting slates, including one which the fanzine had been on, de-legitimized the nominations. While other nominees that year in other categories also withdrew for the same reason, Black Gate's request came after the ballot was finalized and was not accepted, though a note of their intention to withdraw was made on the ballot itself.)	John O'Neill	
2015	Elitist Book Reviews	Steven Diamond	
2015	The Revenge of Hump Day	Tim Bolgeo	
2015	Tangent Online	Dave Truesdale	
2016	File 770*	Mike Glyer	
2016	Castalia House Blog	Jeffro Johnson	
2016	Lady Business	Clare, Ira, Jodie, KJ, Renay, and Susan	
2016	Superversive SF	Jason Rennie	
2016	Tangent Online	Dave Truesdale	
2017	Lady Business*	Clare, Ira, Jodie, KJ, Renay, and Susan	
2017	Castalia House Blog	Jeffro Johnson	
2017	Journey Planet	James Bacon, Christopher J Garcia, Esther MacCallum-Stewart, Helena Nash, Errick Nunnally, Pádraig Ó Méalóid, Chuck Serface, and Erin Underwood	
2017	Nerds of a feather, flock together	The G, Vance Kotrla, and Joe Sherry	
2017	Rocket Stack Rank	Greg Hullender and Eric Wong	
2017	SF Bluestocking	Bridget McKinney	
2018	File 770*	Mike Glyer	
2018	Galactic Journey	Gideon Marcus	
2018	Journey Planet	Team Journey Planet	
2018	Nerds of a feather, flock together	The G, Vance Kotrla, and Joe Sherry	
2018	Rocket Stack Rank	Greg Hullender and Eric Wong	
2018	SF Bluestocking	Bridget McKinney	
2019	Lady Business*	Ira, Jodie, KJ, Renay, and Susan	
2019	Galactic Journey	Gideon Marcus and Janice Marcus	
2019	Journey Planet	Team Journey Planet	
2019	Nerds of a feather, flock together	Joe Sherry, Vance Kotrla, and The G	
2019	Quick Sip Reviews	Charles Payseur	
2019	Rocket Stack Rank	Greg Hullender and Eric Wong	
2020	The Book Smugglers*	Ana Grilo and Thea James	
2020	Galactic Journey	Gideon Marcus, Janice Marcus, Rosemary Benton, Lorelei Marcus, Victoria Silverwolf	
2020	Journey Planet	James Bacon, Christopher J. Garcia, Alissa McKersie, Ann Gry, Chuck Serface, John Coxon, Steven H Silver	
2020	Nerds of a feather, flock together	Adri Joy, Joe Sherry, Vance Kotrla, The G	
2020	Quick Sip Reviews	Charles Payseur	
2020	The Rec Center	Elizabeth Minkel, Gavia Baker-Whitelaw	
2021	Nerds of a feather, flock together*	Adri Joy, Joe Sherry, Vance Kotrla, The G	
2021	The Full Lid	Alasdair Stuart, Marguerite Kenner	
2021	Journey Planet	Michael Carroll et al.	
2021	Lady Business	Ira, Jodie, KJ, Renay, and Susan	
2021	Quick Sip Reviews	Charles Payseur	
2021	Unofficial Hugo Book Club Blog	Amanda Wakaruk, Olav Rokne	
2022	Small Gods*	Lee Moyer, Seanan McGuire	
2022	The Full Lid	Alasdair Stuart, Marguerite Kenner	
2022	Galactic Journey	Gideon Marcus Janice L. Newman, Gwyn Conaway, Jason Sacks, John Boston	
2022	Journey Planet	Erin Underwood et al.	
2022	Quick Sip Reviews	Charles Payseur	
2022	Unofficial Hugo Book Club Blog	Amanda Wakaruk, Olav Rokne	
2023	Zero Gravity Newspaper*	RiverFlow, Ling Shizhen	
2023	Chinese Academic SF Express	Latssep, Tianluo_Qi	
2023	Galactic Journey	Gideon Marcus, Janice Marcus, Tammi Bozich, Erica Frank, Arel Lucas, Mark Yon	
2023	Journey Planet	Regina Kanyu Wang, Yen Ooi, Arthur Liu, Jean Martin, Erin Underwood, Steven H Silver, Pádraig Ó Méalóid et al.	
2023	Nerds of a feather, flock together	Roseanna Pendlebury, Arturo Serrano, Paul Weimer, Adri Joy, Joe Sherry, Vance Kotrla, G. Brown	
2023	Unofficial Hugo Book Club Blog	Olav Rokne, Amanda Wakaruk	
2024	Nerds of a feather, flock together*	Roseanna Pendlebury, Arturo Serrano, Paul Weimer, Joe Sherry, Adri Joy, G. Brown, Vance Kotrla	
2024	Black Nerd Problems	Omar Holmon, William Evans	
2024	The Full Lid	Alasdair Stuart, Marguerite Kenner	
2024	Idea	Geri Sullivan	
2024	Journey Planet	Michael Carroll, Vincent Docherty, Sara Felix, Ann Gry, Sarah Gulde, Allison Hartman Adams, Arthur Liu et al.	
2024	Unofficial Hugo Book Club Blog	Olav Rokne, Amanda Wakaruk	
2025	Black Nerd Problems*	Omar Holmon, William Evans	
2025	Ancillary Review of Books	Jake Casella Brookins, Zachary Gillan, Lane Gillespie, Misha Grifka Wander, Gareth A. Reeves, Bianca Skrinyár, Cynthia Zhang	
2025	The Full Lid	Alasdair Stuart, Marguerite Kenner	
2025	Galactic Journey	Gideon Marcus, Janice L. Newman, Cora Buhlert, Jessica Holmes, Kerrie Dougherty, Kris Vyas-Myall, Natalie Devitt, and the rest of the Journey team	
2025	Journey Planet	Allison Hartman Adams, Amanda Wakaruk, Ann Gry, Jean Martin, Sara Felix, Sarah Gulde, Chuck Serface, David Ferguson, Olav Rokne, Paul Weimer, Steven H Silver, Christopher J. Garcia and James Bacon	
2025	Unofficial Hugo Book Club Blog	Olav Rokne, Amanda Wakaruk	
2026	nerds of a feather, flock together*	Roseanna Pendlebury, Arturo Serrano, Paul Weimer, Joe Sherry, G. Brown, Vance Kotrla	
2026	Ancillary Review of Books	Jake Casella Brookins, Misha Grifka Wander, Bianca Skrinyár, Zachary Gillan, Cynthia Zhang, Lyz Bush-Peel	
2026	Unofficial Hugo Book Club Blog	Olav Rokne, Amanda Wakaruk	
2026	Galactic Journey	Gideon Marcus, Janice L. Newman, David Levinson, Jessica Dickinson Goodman, Tam Phan, Andi Dukleth	
2026	Intergalactic Mixtape	Renay	
2026	Journey Planet	Allison Hartman Adams, Jean Martin, Steven H Silver, Christopher J. Garcia, James Bacon	

=== Retro Hugos ===
Between the 1996 Worldcon and 2025 Worldcon, the World Science Fiction Society had the concept of "Retro-Hugos", in which the Hugo award could be retroactively awarded for 50, 75, or 100 years prior. Retro-Hugos could only be awarded for years after 1939 (the year of the first Worldcon) in which no Hugos were originally awarded. Retro Hugos were awarded eight times, for 1939, 1941, 1943–1946, 1951, and 1954. (Note: Although no "Best Fanzine" Hugo was awarded at the 1958 convention, Hugos were awarded in other categories, hence there was no "Retro Hugo" for 1958 awarded in 2008.)

Retro Hugo winners and nominees
Year	Year awarded	Work	Editor(s)	Ref.
1939	2014	Imagination!*	Forrest J Ackerman, Morojo, and T. Bruce Yerke	
1939	2014	Fantascience Digest	Robert A. Madle	
1939	2014	Fantasy News	James V. Taurasi	
1939	2014	Novae Terrae	Maurice K. Hanson	
1939	2014	Tomorrow	Douglas W. F. Mayer	
1941	2016	Futuria Fantasia*	Ray Bradbury	
1941	2016	Le Zombie	Wilson Tucker	
1941	2016	Novacious	Forrest J Ackerman, Morojo	
1941	2016	Spaceways	Harry Warner, Jr.	
1941	2016	Voice of the Imagi-Nation	Forrest J Ackerman, Myrtle R. Douglas	
1943	2018	Le Zombie*	Wilson Tucker	
1943	2018	Futurian War Digest	J. Michael Rosenblum	
1943	2018	Inspiration	Lynn Bridges	
1943	2018	The Phantagraph	Donald A. Wollheim	
1943	2018	Spaceways	Harry Warner, Jr.	
1943	2018	Voice of the Imagi-Nation	Forrest J Ackerman, Myrtle R. Douglas	
1944	2019	Le Zombie*	Wilson Tucker	
1944	2019	Futurian War Digest	J. Michael Rosenblum	
1944	2019	Guteto	Myrtle R. Douglas	
1944	2019	The Phantagraph	Donald A. Wollheim	
1944	2019	Voice of the Imagi-Nation	Forrest J Ackerman, Myrtle R. Douglas	
1944	2019	YHOS	Art Widner	
1945	2020	Voice of the Imagi-Nation*	Forrest J Ackerman, Myrtle R. Douglas	
1945	2020	The Acolyte	Francis Towner Laney, Samuel D. Russell	
1945	2020	Diablerie	Bill Watson	
1945	2020	Futurian War Digest	J. Michael Rosenblum	
1945	2020	Shangri L'Affaires	Charles E. Burbee	
1945	2020	Le Zombie	Wilson Tucker, E. E. Evans	
1946	1996	Voice of the Imagi-Nation*	Forrest J Ackerman	
1946	1996	The Acolyte	Francis Towner Laney	
1946	1996	Chanticleer	Walt Liebscher	
1946	1996	Fantasy Commentator	A. Langley Searles	
1946	1996	Shangri L'Affaires	Charles E. Burbee and Gerald Hewitt	
1951	2001	Science Fiction Newsletter*	Wilson Tucker	
1951	2001	The Fanscient	Donald B. Day	
1951	2001	Quandry	Lee Hoffman	
1951	2001	Sky Hook	Redd Boggs	
1951	2001	Slant	Walt Willis and James White	
1951	2001	Spacewarp	Art Rapp	
1954	2004	Slant*	Walt Willis and James White	
1954	2004	Hyphen	Walt Willis and Chuck Harris	
1954	2004	Quandry	Lee Hoffman	
1954	2004	Science Fiction Newsletter	Wilson Tucker	
1954	2004	Sky Hook	Redd Boggs	
