= Jack Speer =

American politician and science fiction fan (1920–2008)

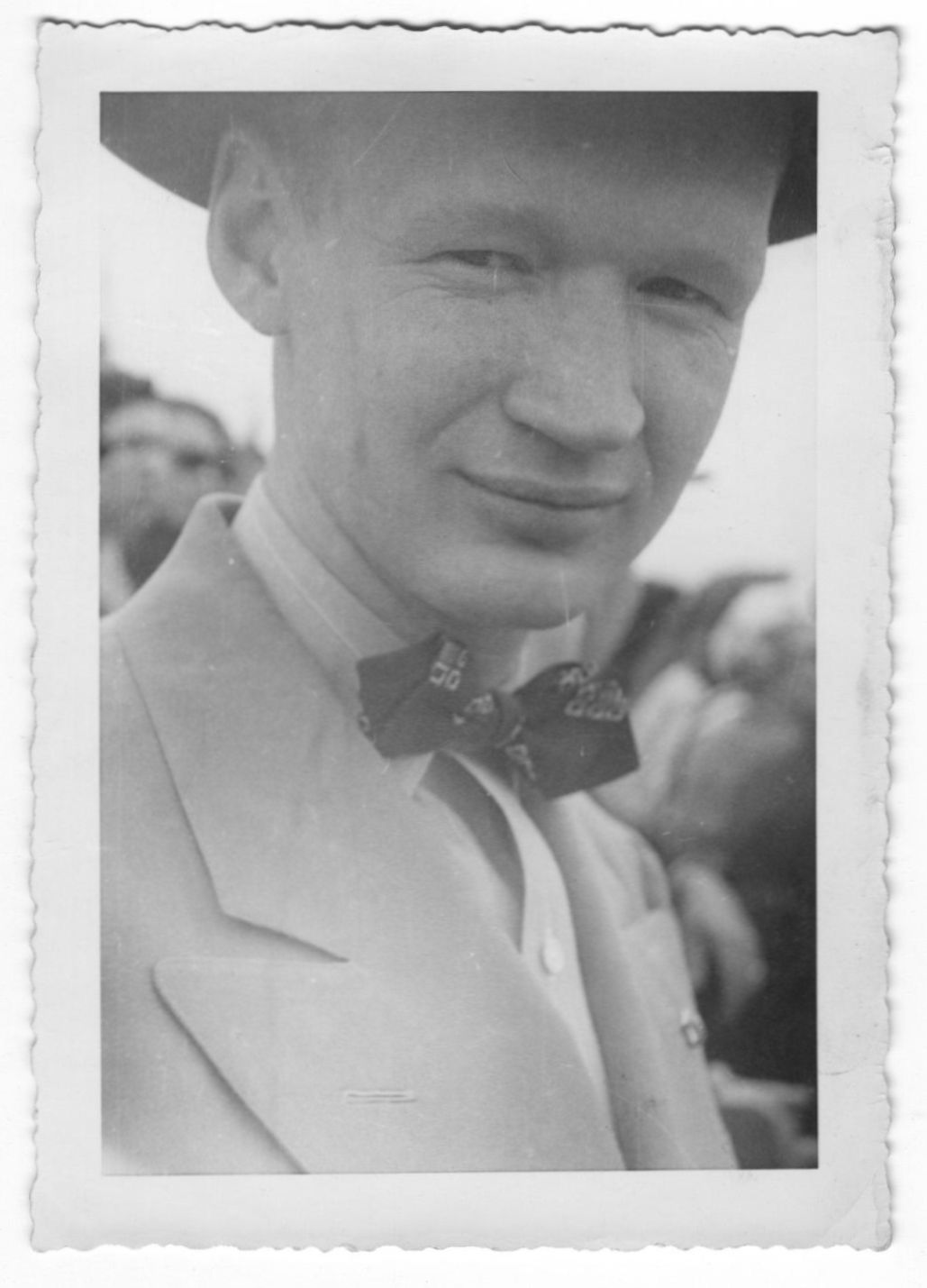
- Jack Speer, ca. 1938

Member of the Washington House of Representatives from the 47th district
- In office 1959–1961

Personal details
- Born: August 8, 1929 Comanche, Oklahoma
- Died: June 28, 2008 (aged 78) Albuquerque, New Mexico
- Party: Democratic

John Bristol Speer (August 9, 1920 – June 28, 2008) was an attorney, practicing law for over 60 years; a judge; and a Washington House of Representatives member.

A long-term science fiction fan, he was described as by Harry Warner, Jr as a pivotal early historian of the science fiction fandom. Speer authored both Up to Now: A History of Science Fiction Fandom and Fancyclopedia.

== Life and career ==
Speer was born in Comanche, Oklahoma. He received his bachelor's degree from George Washington University and, after World War II, his law degree from the University of Washington. During WWII, he worked for the Lend Lease Administration as an administrative aide for the American Food Mission to French North Africa. After the war, he began practicing law in North Bend, Washington.

Speer married his wife of 57 years, Myrtle Ruth Speer, in 1951. The couple had two children, Margaret Ann (now Abercrombie), and Edward.

From 1959 to 1961, he served a term as a Democratic legislator in the Washington state House of Representatives, representing a district in King County.

In 1962, Speer moved to Santa Fe, New Mexico. He continued to practice law and served two terms as the judge of the Bernalillo County Small Claims Court.

He developed a Civil War board game, which was notable in that it followed the actual course of the war. A registered Parliamentarian, he judged high school debates throughout the state of New Mexico.

On 28 June 2008, Speer, 87, died in his home in Albuquerque, New Mexico. He was interred in Santa Fe National Cemetery. He rests near his long-time friend Roy Tackett.

== Contributions to science fiction fandom ==
Speer became infatuated with Buck Rogers, Flash Gordon, and others at an early age. Speer related that he became a dedicated fan in 1934. In his early years in fandom, he sometimes went by the name of John Bristol.

Speer wrote and published fandom's first history, Up to Now: A History of Science Fiction Fandom, in 1939. He was first to formulate a system of "Numerical Fandoms," which was expanded on by other fan historians, including Robert Silverberg; it remained in use until the mid-1950s and is still used to describe early fan eras. In 1944, he followed Up to Now with the first edition of Fancyclopedia, an encyclopedia of fan culture and history and the jargon used in fanzines. Both works are still used as references. However, Fancyclopedia was superseded by an expanded second edition published by Dick Eney in 1959. (There is now a Fancyclopedia 3, which is maintained as a wiki.)

Fan historian Harry Warner, Jr. commented that Speer was "the first to stress (fandom's) subcultural aspects. Single-handedly, he made fandom's ayjays something entirely different from the mundane amateur journalism groups" by introducing the "mailing comment," which has its successor in today's blog comment. Warner considered Speer to be "one of the pioneer historians of fandom".

Speer was also an accomplished photographer. "His collection of photos of fannish faces is an excellent window on early fandom."

In 1940, at Chicon 1, the second Worldcon, Speer distributed a set of science fiction songs. Such songs are now known as filk. These earliest of filk songs were reprinted under the pseudonym John Bristol in Xenofilkia no. 18, as Various Songs, and in no. 19, as Twilight Prelude.

At Chicon, Speer and Milt Rothman suggested a costume party or masquerade. Their suggestion was readily adopted and is still popular with today's fandom.

In the mid-1940s, after founding editor E.E. Evans stepped down, Speer became the editor of the National Fantasy Fan Federation's official journal, The National Fantasy Fan.

In 1995, Speer was inducted into the First Fandom Hall of Fame. In 2004, Speer was one of two Worldcon Fan Guests of Honor at NoreasCon 4 in Boston, Massachusetts.

For over 70 years, Speer published his own amateur science fiction fanzine, which encouraged lively debates and demanded a high standard of literacy in the field.

== Bibliography ==
- Up to Now, 1939
- Fancyclopedia, 1944
- Fancestral Voices, edited by Fred Lerner, NESFA Press, 2004, ISBN 1-886778-56-6
- Last and First Fen, a play, 2004
