= Lee Hoffman =

American novelist

- Lee Hoffman, undated.
- Born: Shirley Bell Hoffman; August 14, 1932; Chicago, Illinois
- Died: February 6, 2007 (aged 74); Port Charlotte, Florida
- Occupation: Author

Shirley Bell Hoffman (1932–2007) was an American science fiction fan, an editor of early folk music fanzines, and an author of science fiction, Western and romance novels. She wrote as Lee Hoffman.

== Career ==
In 1950–53, she edited and published the highly regarded science fiction fanzine, Quandry. In November 1951, she began publication of Science-Fiction Five-Yearly, which appeared regularly since then (the 2006 issue ran 58 pages). Hoffman used a gender-neutral name within science fiction fandom, and many believed that she was a man. In 1951, she 'came out' as a leading editor of the science fiction fanzine Quandry at the 1951 World Science Fiction Convention. Briefly married to editor Larry Shaw from 1956 to 1958, she was the assistant editor on the science fiction magazines he edited, Infinity Science Fiction and Science Fiction Adventures. During that same time, she began editing and publishing her folk music publications, Caravan and Gardyloo, which found a readership through Izzy Young's Folklore Center as the folk music scene expanded during the late 1950s.

Hoffman won the Western Writers of America Spur Award for her novel The Valdez Horses (Doubleday, 1967). In Spain, John Sturges directed the 1973 film adaptation, The Valdez Horses/Valdez, il Mezzosangue (a.k.a. Chino), starring Charles Bronson and Jill Ireland. Under the pseudonym Georgia York, she wrote historical romances for Fawcett Books during the years 1979 to 1983.

In her autobiographical writings, she described the mid-1960s events that led to her Western novels:

Ted White became a very good friend. He was great company, interested in just about everything. He was an excellent artist and an expert in jazz and comic books as well as any number of other subjects. He'd started writing science-fiction professionally, and shared his enthusiasm, inspiring me to try writing a book myself. A Western came most naturally to me. It was a typical horse opera very much in the tradition of the Western paperbacks I'd enjoyed for so long. Don and Jo Meisner critiqued the manuscript for me. Ted read it and encouraged me to submit it.

Another friend, Terry Carr, was assistant to the editor, Don Wollheim, at Ace Books. Ace had a reputation for giving new writers a break. I submitted my manuscript to Terry. I hadn't yet gotten a response on it, when Terry phoned and asked me if I "had time" to write a comic Western. I had plenty of time, but wasn't sure I had the ability. Terry had faith that I did. I wrote some chapters and an outline. Ace bought it, and published it ahead of the action Western I'd done first. I couldn't think of titles, so Terry provided names for both of them, The Legend of Blackjack Sam for the comic one, and Gunfight at Laramie for the horse opera.

The literary agent, Henry Morrison, was a longtime fan. He handled Ted White and some other friends who had become professional writers. He accepted me as a client. With two sales, and another book in the works I quit working regular hours for other people.

She went on to write seventeen Western novels between the years 1966 and 1977 for several publishers—Ace, Avon, Ballantine, Dell, Doubleday, Dell, NAL/Signet—with various editions in Germany, Italy and the UK.

During that same time period, she wrote four science fiction novels: Telepower (Belmont, 1967), The Caves of Karst (Ballantine, 1969), Always the Black Knight (Avon, 1970) and Change Song (Doubleday, 1972). Her short stories include "Soundless Evening", published in Harlan Ellison's Again, Dangerous Visions (1972).

Some of her works have been translated into French, German, Italian, Japanese, Norwegian, Serbo-Croatian, and Swedish.

In 1987, Hoffman was presented the Rebel Award, a lifetime achievement award for a science fiction fan "who has done a great deal for Southern Fandom." Her fanzine The Science-Fiction Half-Yearly was awarded the Hugo Award for Best Fanzine in 2007.

== Death ==
She died in Port Charlotte, Florida of a massive heart attack on February 6, 2007.

== Bibliography ==
=== Science fiction ===
==== Novels ====
- Telepower (Belmont Books, 1967)
- The Caves of Karst (Ballantine Books, 1969)
- Always the Black Knight (Avon Books, 1970)
- Change Song (Doubleday, 1972)

==== Short stories ====
- "A Terrifying Tale (1950)
- "The Tragedy of Fannius McCainius" (in Science-Fiction Five-Yearly #1, November1951)
- "Willis Visits Savanah" (in Slant, Winter 1951)
- "He Died a Terrible Death" (in Grue #27, February 1956)
- "The Ether Jiggles" (in Science-Fiction Five-Yearly #2, November/December 1956)
- "The Wheeled Whollbies of Wilson’s World" (in Science-Fiction Five-Yearly #2, November/December 1956)
- "Dialogue" (1962)
- "The Truth About Steam" (1962)
- "Lost in the Marigolds" (with Robert E. Toomey, Jr.) (in Orbit 9 (Putnam, 1971))
- "Soundless Evening" (in Again, Dangerous Visions (Doubleday, 1972))
- "Once More" (in MagicCon Original Bookmark Anthology, August 1989))
- "Water" (in Grails: Quests, Visitations and Other Occurrences (Unnameable Press, 1992))
- "The Third Nation" (in Confederacy of the Dead (ROC Books, 1993))

==== Miscellaneous ====
- Quandry (fanzine, 30 issues, 1950-1953)
- Science-Fiction Five-Yearly (fanzine, 12 issues, 1951-2006)
- Many Sunsets (poetry collection) (Gafia Press, 1952)
- Some of the Best from Quandry (collection of fanzine pieces) (privately printed, 1960)
- In and Out of Quandry (collection of fanzine pieces) (New England Science Fiction Assn., 1982))

=== Westerns ===
- The Legend of Blackjack Sam (Ace Books, 1966)
- Gunfight at Laramie (Ace Books, 1966)
- Bred to Kill (Ballantine Books, 1967)
- The Valdez Horses (Doubleday, 1967)
- Dead Man's Gold (Ace Books, 1968)
- The Yarborough Brand (Avon Books, 1968)
- Return to Broken Crossing (Ace Books, 1969)
- Wild Riders (NAL/Signet, 1969)
- West of Cheyenne (Doubleday, 1969)
- Loco (Doubleday, 1969)
- Wiley's Move (Dell Books, 1973)
- The Truth About the Cannonball Kid (Dell Books, 1975)
- Trouble Valley (Ballantine Books, 1976)
- Nothing But a Drifter (Doubleday, 1976)
- Fox (Doubleday, 1976)
- Sheriff of Jack Hollow (Dell Books, 1977)
- The Land Killer (Doubleday, 1978)

=== Historical romances (as Georgia York) ===
- Savage Key (Fawcett, 1979)
- Savannah Grey (Fawcett, 1981)
- Savage Conquest (Fawcett, 1983)

=== Nonfiction ===
- "Dots & Dashes" (in Savannah All-Amusement Monthly (May 1948))
- "The Foxes of Endy Bros" (in Savannah All-Amusement Monthly (May 1948))
- "Form a Kart Club" (as Lee Green, with Richard Greenhaus) (in Custom Rodding Magazine (March 1960))
- "Karts – New Trends at Nassau" (in Cars Magazine May 1960))
- "Karts – Keep Moving With a Clutch" (as Mel Marvin) (in Cars Magazine)
- "An Inlaid Checkerboard to Make" (in Miniatures & Dollhouse World (Oct 1979))
- "Essence of Ellison" (in The Book of Ellison (1978))
- "Autobiography" (in Contemporary Authors Autobiography Series - Vol 10 (Gale Research Inc, 1989))
