= Walt Willis =

Irish writer (1919–1999)

Walter Alexander Willis (1919–1999) was a well-known Irish science fiction fan, resident in Belfast.

== Work ==
Willis was awarded a 1958 Hugo Award as "Outstanding Actifan" (active fan), which replaced the Best Fanzine category that year. He was nominated for a best fan writer Hugo in 1969 and two retro-Hugos in the same category (in 2001, 2004 for work in 1951, 1954). In 1959 and 1957 he was nominated in the fanzine category for Hyphen, and he received fanzine retro-Hugo nominations in 2004 for Slant and Hyphen. He shared a retro-Hugo for Slant with that fanzine's art editor James White.

His best known single work is The Enchanted Duplicator (1954), co-written with Bob Shaw, an allegory of a fan's quest to produce the perfect fanzine. This appeared to be closely modeled on The Pilgrim's Progress by John Bunyan (though Willis and Shaw denied having read it beforehand).

Along with White, Shaw, George Charters, Ian McAulay, and John Berry (an English policeman then with the Belfast force), Willis represented the influential Irish Fandom, also known as the Wheels of IF (named after the L. Sprague de Camp fantasy story and collection). Willis, White and Shaw were also referred to as the Belfast Triangle.

Willis was known for his droll, humorous writing, especially in a column "The Harp That Once or Twice" that began in the US fanzine Quandry edited by Lee Hoffman in 1951. This led to Willis's fame in US science fiction fandom and to his attending the 1952 Worldcon in Chicago as a special guest, recipient of travel funds raised by fans, under the leadership of fan Shelby Vick, who called the fund-raising "the Willis Campaign," with the slogan, "WAW with the crew in '52!" which led to the establishment of the annual TransAtlantic Fan Fund. Willis published the founding document for TAFF in "Hyphen 4" (October 1953) following a discussion with "the available leaders of British fandom" at that year's Coroncon. This in turn inspired funds such as the Down Under Fan Fund between Australia and the United States and the Get Up and over Fan Fund (GUFF) between Britain and Australia. Willis's humorous articles about his trip (later collected in a single volume as The Harp Stateside (1957)) established the tradition of fund-winners (and other fan travelers) writing trip reports, usually as separate chapters printed in different fanzines on both sides of the funded trip. The Willis Campaign was not the first attempt by fans to arrange such a visit, but its huge success in promoting international good will encouraged the regular fan funds and also various one-off individual travel funds.

From 1952 to 1959 Willis wrote the Fanorama column in the British science fiction magazine Nebula.

He attended the 1992 Worldcon in Orlando, Florida, as the Fan Guest of Honor.

He published one book professionally, under the pseudonym Walter Bryan: The Improbable Irish (1969), a linked sequence of mostly humorous essays about Ireland, its history and its people.

In 1980, Richard Bergeron, also a former publisher of Willis's fan writing, produced a 600-page hardcover mimeographed fanzine, issue 28 of his fanzine Warhoon, devoted to collecting most of Willis's fannish writings.
