= T. Bruce Yerke =

American science fiction author and editor (1923-1998)

T. (Theodore) Bruce Yerke (1923–1998) was an American science fiction author and editor. A member of "an extensive network of active enthusiasts", he was an early and active member of the Los Angeles Science Fantasy Society, serving as its secretary for many years, and recruited Ray Bradbury as a member. With Forrest J Ackerman he edited the Hugo Award-winning fanzine Imagination!. His unfinished biography, Memoirs of a Superfluous Fan provides great insight into the early days of science fiction fandom in Los Angeles.

He also occasionally wrote under the name Carlton J. Fassbinder.
