= Richard E. Geis =

American novelist

- Born: July 19, 1927
- Died: February 4, 2013 (aged 85)
- Occupations: Writer of science fiction and erotica
- Writing career
- Notable work: Science Fiction Review
- Notable awards: Hugo Awards for Best Fanzine, 1969, 1970, 1977, 1979

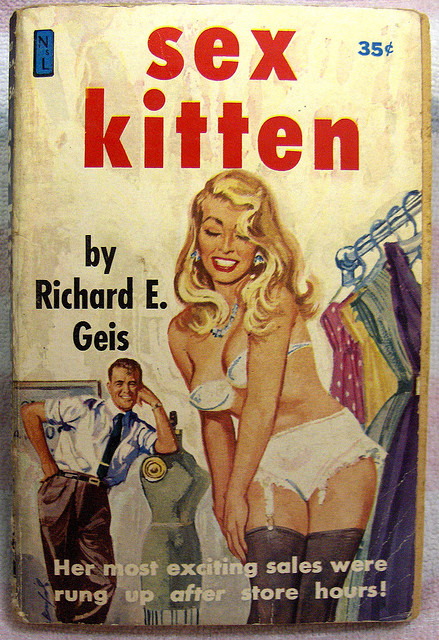
Cover of Sex Kitten, a book by Richard E. Geis

Richard E. Geis (July 19, 1927 – February 4, 2013) was an American science fiction fan and writer, and erotica writer, from Portland, Oregon, who won the Hugo Award for Best Fan Writer in 1971, 1975, 1976, 1977 (tied with Susan Wood), 1978, 1982 and 1983; and whose science fiction fanzine Science Fiction Review won the 1969, 1970, 1977 and 1979 Hugo Awards for Best Fanzine. His The Alien Critic won the Best Fanzine Hugo in 1974 (in a tie with Algol), and in 1975 as sole first place.

He was nominated for the Hugo for Best Fan Writer from 1970 to 1971 and 1973-1986 inclusive; his science fiction fanzines were nominated for the Hugo for Best Fanzine from 1968 to 1971 and 1974-1983 inclusive: a total of 30 Hugo nominations and 13 Hugos. Many of his recent SF-related writings may be read on his page at eFanzines.com.

As of 2005, Geis said he had published 114 books, "110 of them soft-core porn".
