= Spectrum Award for Grand Master =

Spectrum Grand Master Award
- Awarded for: The best in contemporary fantasy, science fiction, and horror artwork.
- Presented by: Spectrum Fantastic Art
- First award: 1995
- Website: http://spectrumfantasticart.com/

The Spectrum Award for Grand Master was awarded annually from 1995 to 2019 by the Spectrum Fantastic Art Advisory Board, which now appears to be defunct. The award is commemorated in the periodic volumes of Spectrum: The Best In Contemporary Fantastic Art, along with other awards, award nominees, artist biographies, and a collection of their art.

A Grand Master, as Arnie Fenner (SFA Advisory Board member) has explained, is an artist who has worked for at least twenty years at a consistently high level of quality; who has influenced and inspired other artists; and who has left his or her mark on the field as a whole. "Craft alone" he writes, " is not sufficient to receive the honor: There are many painters who produce solid professional work. But (and this is the key) it fails to resonate. It is admired in the moment and immediately forgotten. A Grand Master's art, on the other hand, gets stuck in the viewer's heart and memory.

Arnie Fenner also states "At the time of the designation is given the artist must be living. Recently, two GM honorees died prior to the announcement --Al Williamson and Ralph McQuarrie-- which confused a few people, but...both were still with us when the Board bestowed the honor."

== Winners ==
Year	Grand Master	Spectrum Volume	Ref	Awarded At
2020	Terryl Whitlatch	Spectrum 27		
2019	Donato Giancola	Spectrum 26		Spectrum Fantastic Art Live 6 - Kansas City, MO
2018	Claire Wendling	Spectrum 25		Brookledge Theater - Los Angeles, CA
2017	Bill Sienkiewicz	Spectrum 24		Spectrum Fantastic Art Live 5 - Kansas City, MO
2016	Mike Mignola	Spectrum 23		Society of Illustrators - New York City, NY
2015	Scott Gustafson	Spectrum 22		Spectrum Fantastic Art Live 4 - Kansas City, MO
2014	Iain McCaig	Spectrum 21		Spectrum Fantastic Art Live 3 - Kansas City, MO
2013	Gerald Brom	Spectrum 20		Spectrum Fantastic Art Live 2 - Kansas City, MO
2012	James Gurney	Spectrum 19		Spectrum Fantastic Art Live - Kansas City, MO
2011	Ralph McQuarrie	Spectrum 18		
2010	Al Williamson	Spectrum 17		
2009	Richard Corben	Spectrum 16		
2008	John Jude Palencar	Spectrum 15		
2007	Syd Mead	Spectrum 14		
2006	Jeffrey Jones	Spectrum 13		
2005	H. R. Giger	Spectrum 12		
2004	Michael Whelan	Spectrum 11		
2003	Michael William Kaluta	Spectrum 10		
2002	Kinuko Y. Craft	Spectrum 9		
2001	Jean Giraud	Spectrum 8		
2000	Alan Lee	Spectrum 7		
1999	John Berkey	Spectrum 6		
1998	James Bama	Spectrum 5		
1997	Diane Dillon & Leo Dillon	Spectrum 4		
1996	Don Ivan Punchatz	Spectrum 3		
1995	Frank Frazetta	Spectrum 2		
1994	No Award	Spectrum 1		

== See also ==
- Spectrum: The Best In Contemporary Fantastic Art
