= Spectrum: The Best In Contemporary Fantastic Art =

American book series

Spectrum: The Best In Contemporary Fantastic Art is an American large full color book series which showcases fantasy, science fiction, and horror-themed art in eight categories as selected by a rotating jury from an annual competition.

== History ==
Spectrum was initially conceived by Arnie Fenner and Cathy Fenner. Inspired by the popularity of Tomorrow and Beyond, an image anthology edited by Ian Summers in 1978, the annual publication from The Society of Illustrators, and with very successful exhibitions devoted to fantastic art at the New Britain Museum of American Art (1980), and at the Society of Illustrators (1984), the Fenners decided that a volume focusing on the popular genre was justified.

A Call For Entries was mailed to the arts community and a jury of professional artists convened to make selections from the work submitted in initially six categories: Advertising, Book, Comics, Editorial, Institutional, and Unpublished; the results appeared in the first full color book, Spectrum 1, published by Underwood Books in 1994. Later two additional categories were added: Dimensional and Concept Art. A new installment in the Spectrum series has appeared every year since. Underwood Books produced the first twenty volumes.

Feature articles and reviews have been written about the series in such industry publications such as Locus, Realms of Fantasy and Airbrush Art & Action as well as general publications such as the Kansas City Star newspaper and The Post Newspapers - Medina Edition

In 2013, the Fenners semi-retired and licensed the competition and book to John Fleskes, who continues to edit and publish the series under the Flesk Publications imprint.

== Awards ==
Spectrum has had nominations for, and has won, many industry awards over its history. Among them are:

Won the Locus Award for Best Illustrated and Art Book 15 times.

Nominated eight times for the Hugo Award for Best Related Work.

Won the Chesley Award for Art Direction.

Won the World Fantasy Award for Special Award, Professional.

== Selection process ==
Every year, a Call For Entries poster is sent out to anyone who requests it; a different popular illustrator provides the poster art each year. Among past poster artists are Frank Frazetta, Phil Hale, Rebecca Guay, and Brom. Notice of the competition is also made via the internet, social media and through email. Submissions are made to the website in digital form by an announced deadline.

A jury of award-winning artists and art directors physically assembles in Kansas City to view and judge the submissions rather than have them vote in isolation from home via the internet.

The jury casts anonymous votes on all of the submissions and simultaneously nominates works for award consideration; a group discussion follows the conclusion of voting to present a Gold and a Silver award in each category. Artworks that receive a simple majority of votes—3 out of 5—are included in the book.

All artists selected for publication receive a copy of the book at no expense to them; Spectrum was the first annual to give each included artist a book.

== Spectrum Fantastic Art Live! ==
The Spectrum series also inspired a semi-annual event, Spectrum Fantastic Art Live! (SFAL) beginning in 2012 in Kansas City. Intended as a combination convention/art fair for the fantasy and science fiction art community, it has attracted artists, industry professionals and fans from around the world.

The event features booths and tables for artists to sell originals and prints to the public along with programming that includes panel discussions, workshops, live painting demonstrations, and portfolio reviews by art directors from the book, comics, gaming, and entertainment industries. The Spectrum Awards have also been presented at an evening ceremony during the convention.

In 2019 Spectrum Fantastic Art Live! Collaborated with Planet Comicon Kansas City, one of the midwest's largest pop-culture conventions, for the event.

The first Spectrum Fantastic Art Live! was held in Kansas City, May 18–20, 2012. A commemorative hardcover book showcasing the art of the five special guests was produced.

== Volumes ==
=== Spectrum 1 ===
Pages	Artworks	Artists	Essays	Front Cover	Back Cover	Jury Members	Notes
152	195	91	Chairman's Message - Cathy Burnett; Introduction - Lee Stuart	James Gurney	Joseph DeVito	Rick Berry, Arnie Fenner, Tim Kirk; Don Ivan Punchatz, Dave Stevens; Lisa Tallarico-Robertson and Michael R. Whelan	The First Edition editor was credited to Cathy Burnett. Later editions were credited to Cathy Fenner after she and Arnie Fenner were married. There was a hardcover edition signed by all of the jurors, limited to 500 copies that was also published. This first volume did not have Gold or Silver awards, but Merit Awards were given to the Artists. The winners of The Chesley Awards by the Association of Science Fiction & Fantasy Artists organization were also listed.

Spectrum 1 Awards
Advertising	Book	Comics	Editorial	Institutional	Unpublished
Nick Gaetano; Jerry Lofaro	Garry Ruddell; Richard Bernal	Simon Bisley; Ray Lago; Bill Sienkiewicz	Herb Davidson; Rick Berry; Darrel Anderson	Scott Gustafson; John Rush; Hap Henrikson; James Gurney; Thomas Blackshea II	Phil Hale; Myles Pinkney; Michael R. Whelan

=== Spectrum 2 ===
Pages	Artworks	Artists	Essays	Front Cover	Back Cover	Jury Members	Notes
134	230	133	Chairman's Message - Cathy Burnett and Arnie Fenner	First Edition: Rick Berry; Later editions: Steven Assel	Phil Hale	Rick Berry, Terri Windling, Charles Vess, David Cherry, and Kerig Pope	The First Edition editor was credited to Cathy Burnett. Later editions were credited to Cathy Fenner after she and Arnie Fenner were married. On this volume, the original cover was Rick Berry's digital painting of "Death" done for DC Comics. DC Comics asked to change it on reprints since Spectrum was not a part of DC. The winners of The Chesley Awards by the Association of Science Fiction & Fantasy Artists organization were also listed.

Spectrum 2 Awards
GRAND MASTER AWARD	Award	Advertising	Book	Comics	Editorial	Institutional	Unpublished
Frank Frazetta	Gold	Steve Armes	Dean Morrissey	Joe Chiodo	Marshall Arisman	Stephen Hickman; Thomas Blackshear II	Phil Hale
	Silver	Jerry Lofaro	Donato Giancola	Charles Vess	Rosh Ruppel	Rick Berry; Scott Mack; Joseph DeVito	Dennis Nolan
	Certificate Of Merit		Brian Froud; James Gurney	John Bolton; Gary Gianni	Kinuko Y. Craft; Nick Gaetano	Ezra Tucker; Scott Gustafson	William Stout; John Rush

=== Spectrum 3 ===
Pages	Artworks	Artists	Essays	Front Cover	Back Cover	Jury Members	Notes
141	228	148	Chairman's Message - Cathy Burnett and Arnie Fenner; The Year In Review - Arnie Fenner	Frank Frazetta	Donato Giancola	Gary Ruddell, Harlan Ellison, Bill Nelson, Mike Mignola, Teri Czeczko, Jill Bauman, and Dennis Kitchen	The First Edition editor was credited to Cathy Burnett. Later editions were credited to Cathy Fenner after she and Arnie Fenner were married. The Dimensional category was added with this volume. The winners of The Chesley Awards by the Association of Science Fiction & Fantasy Artists organization were also listed.

Spectrum 3 Awards
GRAND MASTER AWARD	Award	Advertising	Book	Comics	Dimensional	Editorial	Institutional	Unpublished
Don Ivan Punchatz	Gold	John Rush	John Jude Palencar	Mark Chiarello	Randy Bowen	Mel Odom	James Gurney	Steven Assael
	Silver	Doug Beekman	Brom	John Mueller	Mark Newman	Luis Royo	Scott Gustafson	Tim O'Brien
	Certificate Of Merit	Stu Suchit; Garry Ruddell	Donato Giancola; Bruce Jensen	Doug Beekman; Glen Orbik, Laurel Blechman, & Shawn Zents	Tom Taggart; Pedro Martin	James Warhola; Robh Ruppel	Frank Frazetta; Jay Hong	Walter Velez; John Foster

=== Spectrum 4 ===
Pages	Artworks	Artists	Essays	Front Cover	Back Cover	Jury Members	Notes
141	245	171	Chairman's Message - Cathy Fenner and Arnie Fenner; The Year In Review - Arnie Fenner	James C. Christensen	Yuri Bartoli	Gary Kelly, Sue Ann Harkey, Maria Carbado, Vincent DiFate, Bud Plant, and Vern Dufford	The winners of The Chesley Awards by the Association of Science Fiction & Fantasy Artists organization were listed.

Spectrum 4 Awards
GRAND MASTER AWARD	Award	Advertising	Book	Comics	Dimensional	Editorial	Institutional	Unpublished
Leo & Diane Dillon	Gold	Rafal Olbinski	John Jude Palencar	Doug Beekman	Joseph DeVito	Rick Berry	Phil Hale	Michael R. Whelan
	Silver	Stephan "Cricket" Martiniere	James C. Christensen	Mark Schultz	J.A. Pippett	Brad Holland	Petar Meseldzija	Jeff Miracola

=== Spectrum 5 ===
Pages	Artworks	Artists	Essays	Front Cover	Back Cover	Jury Members
165	318	199	Editor's Message - Cathy & Arnie Fenner; The Year In Review - Arnie Fenner	Donato Giancola	Kent Williams	Terry Lee, Joe Kubert, Tom Dolphins, John English, Joseph DeVito, and Donato Giancola

Spectrum 5 Awards
GRAND MASTER AWARD	Award	Advertising	Book	Comics	Dimensional	Editorial	Institutional	Unpublished
James Bama	Gold	Greg Spalenka	Dave McKean	Travis Charest	Lawrence Northey	Thorn Ang	Jeffrey Catherine Jones	Phil Hale
	Silver	Ezra Tucker	Richard Bernal	Vincent Evans	The Shiflett Bros.	James Gurney	David DeVries	Kirk Reinert

=== Spectrum 6 ===
Pages	Artworks	Artists	Essays	Front Cover	Back Cover	Jury Members	Notes
173	282	200	Chairman's Message - Cathy Fenner and Arnie Fenner; The Year In Review - Arnie Fenner	Jim Burns	Scott Gustafson	Steve Mark, Phil Reynolds, George Diggs, Ken Westphal, Susan Sifers, John Jude Palencar, Bud Plant, and Phil Hale	This year held a Spectrum Student Competition which awarded scholarships.

Spectrum 6 Awards
GRAND MASTER AWARD	Award	Advertising	Book	Comics	Dimensional	Editorial	Institutional	Unpublished
John Berkey	Gold	Jerry Lofaro	Shaun Tan	Dave DeVries	Lawrence Northey	Gary Kelly	Eric Bowman	Stephen Hickman
	Silver	Ashley Wood	Gary Gianni	Dave McKean	Miles Teves	Donato Giancola	Oddworld Inhabitants	Patrick Arrasmith

Spectrum Student Competition	$1,000 Scholarship	$500 Scholarship	$300 Scholarship
	Jin N. Lee	Eric Fortune	Thomas L. Hicke II

=== Spectrum 7 ===
Pages	Artworks	Artists	Essays	Front Cover	Back Cover	Jury Members
195	330	226	Chairman's Message - Cathy Fenner and Arnie Fenner; The Year In Review - Arnie Fenner	Cliff Nielsen	Jon Foster	Rick Berry, Vern Dufford, Scott Gustafson, Bob Haas, Bud Plant, Toby Schwartz, and Greg Spalenka

Spectrum 7 Awards
GRAND MASTER AWARD	Award	Advertising	Book	Comics	Dimensional	Editorial	Institutional	Unpublished
Alan Lee	Gold	Rafal Olbinski	Kinuko Y. Craft	Phil Hale	Sharon Matsumoto	Jody Hewgill	Greg Spalenka	Michael R. Whelan
	Silver	Dave McKean	David Ho	Michael William Kaluta	Greg Polutanovich	Wes Benscoter	John Foster	David Ho

=== Spectrum 8 ===
Pages	Artworks	Artists	Essays	Front Cover	Back Cover	Jury Members
173	298	211	Chairman's Message - Cathy Fenner and Arnie Fenner; The Year In Review - Arnie Fenner	Alan Pollack	Michael R. Whelan	Brom, Harlan Ellison, Irene Gallo, Guy Giunta, Gregory Manchess, and John Jude Palencar

Spectrum 8 Awards
GRAND MASTER AWARD	Award	Advertising	Book	Comics	Dimensional	Editorial	Institutional	Unpublished
Jean Giraud	Gold	Kinuko Y. Craft	David Bowers	Dave McKean	Jean-Louis Crinon	Donato Giancola	Eric Bowman	Jason Nobriga
	Silver	Matt Stawicki	Shaun Tan	Phil Hale	Joel Harlow	James Gurney	Oddworld Inhabitants	Gregory Manchess

=== Spectrum 9 ===
Pages	Artworks	Artists	Essays	Front Cover	Back Cover	Jury Members
173	322	216	Chairman's Message - Cathy Fenner and Arnie Fenner; The Year In Review - Arnie Fenner	Daniael R. Horne	Donato Giancola	Rick Berry, Terese Nielsen, Bob Haas, Phil Hale, David DeVries, and Tim Holter Bruckner

Spectrum 9 Awards
GRAND MASTER AWARD	Award	Advertising	Book	Comics	Dimensional	Editorial	Institutional	Unpublished
Kinuko Y. Craft	Gold	Ashley Wood	Phil Hale	Ashley Wood	Tim Holter Bruckner	Phil Hale	Justin Sweet	Eric Bowman
	Silver	Greg Spalenka	Shaun Tan; Kent Williams	Dave McKean; Rick Berry	Lawrence Northey	Jon Foster	Rick Berry	Nilson

=== Spectrum 10 ===
Pages	Artworks	Artists	Essays	Front Cover	Back Cover	Jury Members
173	303	221	Chairman's Message - Cathy Fenner and Arnie Fenner; The Year In Review - Arnie Fenner	Christophe Vacher	Raymond Swanland	Mark Chiarello, Bob Eggleton, C.F. Payne, Bud Plant, Kelly Seda, and Michael R. Whelan

Spectrum 10 Awards
GRAND MASTER AWARD	Award	Advertising	Book	Comics	Dimensional	Editorial	Institutional	Unpublished
Michael William Kaluta	Gold	Dave McKean	Charles Vess	Jon Foster	Lawrence Northey	James Gurney	Peter De Sève	Eric Joyner
	Silver	Donato Giancola	Kinuko Y. Craft	Christopher Moeller	William Basso	Omar Rayyan	Eric Bowman	Petar Meseldžija

=== Spectrum 11 ===
Pages	Artworks	Artists	Essays	Front Cover	Back Cover	Jury Members	Notes
205	401	272	Chairman's Message - Cathy Fenner; The Year In Review - Arnie Fenner	Eric Joyner	Paul Bonner	Gary Brewer, Joseph DeVito, Gary Gianni, John Jude Palencar, Greg Spalenka, and Roxana Villa	Starting with this volume, the books were published in a larger 9 by 12 inch format.

Spectrum 11 Awards
GRAND MASTER AWARD	Award	Advertising	Book	Comics	Dimensional	Editorial	Institutional	Unpublished
Michael R. Whelan	Gold	Rene Milot	David Bowers	Stephan "Cricket" Martiniere	Thomas S. Kuebler	Michael Gibbs	Todd Schorr	Raymond Swanland
	Silver	William Stout	Greg Swearingen	Phil Hale	Thomas s. Kuebler	Peter de Sève	Brian Despain	Patrick Arrasmith

=== Spectrum 12 ===
Pages	Artworks	Artists	Essays	Front Cover	Back Cover	Jury Members
205	387	273	Chairman's Message - Cathy Fenner; The Year In Review - Arnie Fenner; Grand Master Award essay - Harlan Ellison	David Bowers	Manchu	Jon Foster, Irene Gallo, Anita Kunz, Karen Palinko, David Stevenson, and William Stout

Spectrum 12 Awards
GRAND MASTER AWARD	Award	Advertising	Book	Comics	Dimensional	Editorial	Institutional	Unpublished
H. R. Giger	Gold	Brom	Brad Holland	Greg Ruth	Lawrence Northey	Thomas L. Fluharty	Arthur Suydam	Travis A. Louie
	Silver	Justin Sweet	Paul Bonner	Mike Huddleston	Ryan K. Peterson	Shaun Tan	Dave DeVries	Matt Gaser

=== Spectrum 13 ===
Pages	Artworks	Artists	Essays	Front Cover	Back Cover	Jury Members
221	404	300	Chairman's Message - Cathy Fenner; The Year In Review - Arnie Fenner; Spectrum: The Exhibition; Katrinarita - William Joyce	Donato Giancola	Jason Chan	Brom, Bruce Jnsen, Christopher Klein, Heidi MacDonald, Stephan Martiniere, and Meg Walsh

Spectrum 13 Awards
GRAND MASTER AWARD	Award	Advertising	Book	Comics	Dimensional	Editorial	Institutional	Unpublished
Jeffrey Catherine Jones	Gold	Donato Giancola	Jon Foster	Jeremy Geddes	Tim Bruckner	William Stout	Cos Koniotis	August Hall
	Silver	Andrew Jones	Michael J. Deas	David Hartman	Andrew Sinclair	Yuko Shimizu	Daniel Dociu	William Carman

=== Spectrum 14 ===
Pages	Artworks	Artists	Essays	Front Cover	Back Cover	Jury Members	Notes
248	454	317	Chairman's Message - Cathy Fenner; The Year In Review - Arnie Fenner	Andrew Jones	Aleksi Briclot	Mark Chiarello, Dan dos Santos, Marc Gabbana, Dawn Murin, Ragnar, and Adam Rex	This volume introduced the category of Concept Art.

Spectrum 14 Awards
GRAND MASTER AWARD	Award	Advertising	Book	Comics	Concept Art	Dimensional	Editorial	Institutional	Unpublished
Syd Mead	Gold	James Jean	Jon Foster	Adam Hughes	Daniel Dociu	Cam De Leon	James Jean	William Basso	Joao Ruas
	Silver	Donato Giancola	Shaun Tan	James Jean	Jonny Duddle	Rich Klink	Joao Ruas	Todd Lockwood	Johnny Yanok

=== Spectrum 15 ===
Pages	Artworks	Artists	Essays	Front Cover	Back Cover	Jury Members	Notes
264	456	322	Chairman's Message - Cathy Fenner; The Year In Review - Arnie Fenner	Michael R. Whelan	Omar Rayyan	Daren Bader, Tim Bodendistel, Kelly Seda, Justin Sweet, and Frank Cho	To mark the 15th Anniversary of the competition and annual, a special "Best In Show" award was designated.

Spectrum 15 Awards
GRAND MASTER AWARD	Award	Advertising	Book	Comics	Concept Art	Dimensional	Editorial	Institutional	Unpublished
John Jude Palencar	Gold	Johnny Yanok	Sam Weber	James Jean	Daniel Dociu	A. Brent Armstrong	Phil Hale	Robh Ruppel	Omar Rayyan
Best In Show; James Jean	Silver	Brom	Stephan Martiniere	Adam Hughes	Daniel Dociu	Akihito Ikeda	Kurt Huggins & Zelda Devon	Larry MacDougall	Brom

=== Spectrum 16 ===
Pages	Artworks	Artists	Essays	Front Cover	Back Cover	Jury Members
264	439	303	Chairman's Message - Cathy Fenner; The Year In Review - Arnie Fenner	Melanie Delon	Eric Fortune	Kevin Brimmer, David Dorman, Donato Giancola, Steven Sanders, and Bob Self

Spectrum 16 Awards
GRAND MASTER AWARD	Award	Advertising	Book	Comics	Concept Art	Dimensional	Editorial	Institutional	Unpublished
Richard V. Corben	Gold	Ryohei Hase	Petar Meseldžija	Jon Foster	Daniel Dociu	Akiito Ikeda	Craig Elliott	James Gurney	Jeremy Enecio
	Silver	Yuko Shimizu	Jean-Baptiste Monge	Aleksi Briclot	Kekai Kotaki	David Meng	Nate Van Dyke	Jaime Jones	Dave Laub

=== Spectrum 17 ===
Pages	Artworks	Artists	Essays	Front Cover	Back Cover	Jury Members
288	486	339	Chairman's Message - Cathy Fenner; The Year In Review - Arnie Fenner; Grand Master Award essay - John Fleskes	Gregory Manchess	Jean-Sebastien Rossbach	Kerry Callen, Bill Carman, John Fleskes, Rebecca Guay, and Iain McCaig

Spectrum 17 Awards
GRAND MASTER AWARD	Award	Advertising	Book	Comics	Concept Art	Dimensional	Editorial	Institutional	Unpublished
Al Wiliamson	Gold	Sam Weber	Omar Rayyan	Steven Tabbutt	Daniel Dociu	Mark Newman	Chris Buzelli	Ed Binkley	Eric Fortune
	Silver	Craig Elliott	Scott Gustafson	Eric Orchard	Ritchie Sacilioc	Jack Mathews; Virginie Ropars	Sam Weber	Michael J. Deas	Donato Giancola; Heather Theurer

=== Spectrum 18 ===
Pages	Artworks	Artists	Essays	Front Cover	Back Cover	Jury Members
304	497	340	Chairman's Message - Cathy Fenner; Looking Forward, Looking Back - Arnie Fenner; Grand Master Award essay - Jane Frank	Jean-Sebastien Rossbach	William Stout	Julie Bell, Nathan Fox, Gregory Manchess, Grandon Shiflett & Jarrod Shiflett, Boris Vallejo, and Shena Wolf

Spectrum 18 Awards
GRAND MASTER AWARD	Award	Advertising	Book	Comics	Concept Art	Dimensional	Editorial	Institutional	Unpublished
Ralph McQuarrie	Gold	Ryohei Hase	David Palumbo	Rebecca Guay	Kekai Kolaki	David Meng	Android Jones	Richard Anderson	Rebecca Guay
	Silver	Sam Weber	Dan dos Santos	Joao Ruas; David Palumbo	Tomasz Jedruszek	Akihito	Brom	Donato Giancola	S.S. Rossbach

=== Spectrum 19 ===
Pages	Artworks	Artists	Essays	Front Cover	Back Cover	Jury Members	Notes
304	506	345	Chairman's Message - Cathy Fenner; 2011, Briefly Noted - Arnie Fenner	Brom	Lisa Falkenstern	Scott Gustafson (Jury Chairman), Jeremy Cranford, Peter de Sève, Dawn Rivera, and Jon Schindehette	Writeup and photos of The Spectrum 19 Awards Ceremony held at Spectrum Fantastic Art Live!

Spectrum 19 Awards
GRAND MASTER AWARD	Award	Advertising	Book	Comics	Concept Art	Dimensional	Editorial	Institutional	Unpublished
James Gurney	Gold	Tyler Jacobson	Edward Kinsella III	Alex Alice	Justin Sweet	Virginie Ropars	Jean-Baptiste Monge	Raoul Vitale	Michael R. Whelan
	Silver	Android Jones	Jean-Baptiste Monge	Jim Murray	Daniel Dociu	Thomas S. Kuebler	James Gurney	Android Jones	Justin Gerard

=== Spectrum 20 ===
Pages	Artworks	Artists	Essays	Front Cover	Back Cover	Jury Members
304	456	340	Chairman's Message - Cathy Fenner; Hello, I Must Be Going - Arnie Fenner	Donato Giancola	Bill Mayer	Tim Bruckner, Irene Gallo, Tim Kirk, Mark A. Nelson, and Michael R. Whelan

Spectrum 20 Awards
GRAND MASTER AWARD	Award	Advertising	Book	Comics	Concept Art	Dimensional	Editorial	Institutional	Unpublished
Brom	Gold	Dan dos Santos	David Palumbo	Paolo Rivera	Allen Williams	Virginie Ropars	Sam Bosma	Kekai Kotaki	Cory Godbey
	Silver	Android Jones	Charles Vess	David Petersen	Daniel Dociu	David Meng	Sam Weber	Lucas Graciano	Andrew Mar

=== Spectrum 21 ===
Pages	Artworks	Artists	Essays	Featured Artist	Front Cover	Back Cover	Jury Members	Notes
304	553	264	Grand Master Award essay - Terri Windling; The Year In Review - John Fleskes; Ray Harryhausen Remembered - William Stout	Android Jones	Rebecca Léveillé-Guay	Gabriel Verdon	Cory Godbey, George Pratt, J. Anthony Kosar, Shelly Wan, and Allen Williams	This was the first volume to be edited by John Fleskes, taking over for Arnie and Cathy Fenner.

Spectrum 21 Awards
GRAND MASTER AWARD	Award	Advertising	Book	Comics	Concept Art	Dimensional	Editorial	Institutional	Unpublished
Iain McCaig	Gold	Kent Williams	Nicholas Delort	Thomas Campi	Theo Prins	The Shiflett Bros.	Tran Nguyen	Bill Carman	Omar Rayyan
	Silver	Victo Ngai	Scott Gustafson	Mark A. Nelson	Vance Kovacs	Colin & Kristine Poole	Yuko Shimizu	Justin Sweet	Yukari Masuike

=== Spectrum 22 ===
Pages	Artworks	Artists	Essays	Front Cover	Back Cover	Jury Members	Notes
304	482	241	The Grand Master Award essay - Gary Gianni; The Year In Review - John Fleskes	Bastien Lecouffe Deharme	Tran Nguyen	Justin Gerard, Virginie Ropars, Greg Ruth, Annie Stegg Gerard, and Dice Tsutsumi	Short articles were The Spectrum Muse and an overview of Spectrum Fantastic Art Live.

Spectrum 22 Awards
GRAND MASTER AWARD	Award	Advertising	Book	Comics	Concept Art	Dimensional	Editorial	Institutional	Unpublished
Scott Gustafson	Gold	Taylor Wessling	Dan dos Santos	Audrey Benjaminsen	Sung Choi	Forest Rogers	Tran Nguyen	Rovina Cai	Cynthia Sheppard
	Silver	Yuko Shimizu	Scott Gustafson	Alex Alice	Audrey Benjaminsen	David Silva	Sam Bosma	Laura Lee Brom	Paul Bonner
Rising Star Award
Wylie Beckert

=== Spectrum 23 ===
Pages	Artworks	Artists	Essays	Front Cover	Back Cover	Jury Members
304	513	281	Grand Master Award essay - Rebecca Léveillé-Guay; Spectrum 23 Award Ceremony and Year In Review - John Fleskes	Android Jones	Julie Bell	David Palumbo, Cynthia Sheppard, Kirk Thatcher, Charlie Wen, and Terryl Whitlatch

Spectrum 23 Awards
GRAND MASTER AWARD	Award	Advertising	Book	Comics	Concept Art	Dimensional	Editorial	Institutional	Unpublished
Mike Mignola	Gold	Nico Delort	Rovina Cai	Daren Bader	Vance Kovacs	Forest Rogers	Tran Nguyen	Tyler Jacobson	Rob Rey
	Silver	Joseph Qiu	Karla Ortiz	Nic Klein	Te Hu	Thomas Kuebler	Chris Seaman	Julie Bell	Wayne Haag
Rising Star Award
Victor Maury

=== Spectrum 24 ===
Pages	Artworks	Artists	Essays	Front Cover	Back Cover	Jury Members
304	527	296	Grand Master Award essay - George Pratt; Spectrum 24 Awards - J. Anthony Kosar; Year In Review - John Fleskes	Iain McCaig	Emily Chen	Christian Alzmann, Laura Lee Brom, Mark Newman, Victo Ngai, and John Picaclo

Spectrum 24 Awards
GRAND MASTER AWARD	Award	Advertising	Book	Comics	Concept Art	Dimensional	Editorial	Institutional	Unpublished
Bill Sienkiewicz	Gold	Bayard Wu	Brom	Jeremy Wilson	Sean Andrew Murray	Jesse Thompson	Tim O'Brien	Bill Carman	Karla Ortiz
	Silver	Greg Ruth	Edward Kinsella III	Dave McKean	Iain McCaig	Akihito (Ikeda)	Galen Dara	Ed Binkley	Jeffery Alan Love
Rising Star Award
Alessandra Pisano

=== Spectrum 25 ===
Pages	Artworks	Artists	Essays	Front Cover	Back Cover	Jury Members
303	435	269	Grand Master Award essay - Arnie Fenner; Year In Review - John Fleskes	Paul Bonner	Wesley Burt	Terry Dodson, Tyler Jacobson, Tran Nguyen, Karla Ortiz, and Chuck Pyle

Spectrum 25 Awards
GRAND MASTER AWARD	Award	Advertising	Book	Comics	Concept Art	Dimensional	Editorial	Institutional	Unpublished
Claire Wendling	Gold	Greg Ruth	Victo Ngai	Alex Alice	Wangjie Li	Forest Rogers	Edward Kinsella III	Seb McKinnon	Andrew Hem
	Silver	Laurel Blechman	Petar Meseldžija	Gary Gianni	Anthony Francisco	Jessica Dalva	Tim O'Brien	Piotr Jablonski	Michael Macrae
Rising Star Award
Miranda Meeks

=== Spectrum 26 ===
Pages	Artworks	Artists	Essays	Front Cover	Back Cover	Jury Members
336	?	335	Grand Master Award essay - Dan dos Santos; Year In Review - John Fleskes	Audrey Benjaminsen	Scott Gustafson	Kei Acedera, Wesley Burt, Bobby Chiu, Edward Kinsella III, Colin Poole, Kristine Poole

Spectrum 26 Awards
GRAND MASTER AWARD	Award	Advertising	Book	Comics	Concept Art	Dimensional	Editorial	Institutional	Unpublished
Donato Giancola	Gold	Greg Ruth	Francis Vallejo	Alex Alice	Abe Taraky	Patrick Masson	Qiuxin Mao	Jesper Ejsing	Konstantin Kostadinov
	Silver	Valentin Kopetzki	Chase Stone	Jeffrey Alan Love	Danny Moll	Paul Komoda	Leonardo Santamaria	John Jude Palencar	Annie Stegg Gerard
Rising Star Award
Ki "Gawki" Kline

=== Spectrum 27 ===
Pages	Artworks	Artists	Essays	Front Cover	Back Cover	Jury Members	Notes
303	?	217	Grand Master Award essay - John Fleskes; Year In Review - John Fleskes	Tommy Arnold	Wylie Beckert, Ed Binkley, Galen Dara, Petar Meseldžija, Alex Alice	Alice A. Carter, Craig Elliott, Anthony Francisco, Courtney Granner, Forest Rogers, Chie Yoshii	Renamed Rising Star Award to the Muse award. Created and presented by sculptors Colin and Kristine Poole and intended to encourage a young artist.

Spectrum 27 Awards
GRAND MASTER AWARD	Award	Advertising	Book	Comics	Concept Art	Dimensional	Editorial	Institutional	Unpublished
Terryl Whitlatch	Gold	Bartosz Kosowski	Rovina Cai	Tim Probert	Tooth Wu	Dug Stanat	Red Nose Studio	John Jude Palencar	Diego Fernandez
	Silver	Brom	Sija Hong	Claudya Schmidt	Ian Jun Wei Chiew	Michihiro Matsuoka	Sam Araya	Iain McCaig	Daniel Zrom
Muse Award
Alex Dos Diaz
