= Locus Award for Best Illustrated and Art Book =

The Locus Award for Best Art Book is one of the annual Locus Awards presented by the science fiction and fantasy magazine Locus. Awards presented in a given year are for works published in the previous calendar year. The award for Best Art Book was given out for two years 1979-1980 and then revived in 1994.

In 2009-2010 the Art Book and Non-Fiction categories were merged. In 2009 a graphic novel won, and is listed below, while in 2010 the winner was a prose non-fiction work and is not mentioned here.

== Winners ==
| Year | Nominated work | Creator(s) | Ref. |
|---|---|---|---|
| 1979 | Tomorrow and Beyond | Ian Summers | |
| 1980 | Barlowe's Guide to Extraterrestrials | Wayne Douglas Barlowe, Ian Summers | |
| 1994 | The Art of Michael Whelan: Scenes/Visions | Michael Whelan | |
| 1995 | Spectrum: The Best In Contemporary Fantastic Art | Cathy Burnett & Arnie Fenner | |
| 1996 | Spectrum 2: The Best in Contemporary Fantastic Art | Cathy Burnett & Arnie Fenner | |
| 1997 | Spectrum 3: The Best in Contemporary Fantastic Art | Cathy Burnett & Arnie Fenner | |
| 1998 | Infinite Worlds: The Fantastic Visions of Science Fiction Art | Vincent Di Fate | |
| 1999 | Spectrum 5: The Best in Contemporary Fantastic Art | Cathy Burnett & Arnie Fenner | |
| 2000 | Science Fiction of the 20th Century | Frank M. Robinson | |
| 2001 | Spectrum 7: The Best in Contemporary Fantastic Art | Cathy Burnett & Arnie Fenner | |
| 2002 | Spectrum 8: The Best in Contemporary Fantastic Art | Cathy Fenner & Arnie Fenner | |
| 2003 | Spectrum 9: The Best in Contemporary Fantastic Art | Cathy Fenner & Arnie Fenner | |
| 2004 | The Sandman: Endless Nights | Neil Gaiman et al. | |
| 2005 | Spectrum 11: The Best in Contemporary Fantastic Art | Cathy Fenner & Arnie Fenner | |
| 2006 | Spectrum 12: The Best in Contemporary Fantastic Art | Cathy Fenner & Arnie Fenner | |
| 2007 | Spectrum 13: The Best in Contemporary Fantastic Art | Cathy Fenner & Arnie Fenner | |
| 2008 | The Arrival | Shaun Tan | |
| 2009 | Coraline: The Graphic Novel | Neil Gaiman, P. Craig Russell | |
| 2010 | Art book not honoured | | |
| 2011 | Spectrum 17: The Best in Contemporary Fantastic Art | Cathy Fenner & Arnie Fenner | |
| 2012 | No award made | | |
| 2013 | Spectrum 18: The Best in Contemporary Fantastic Art | Cathy Fenner & Arnie Fenner | |
| 2014 | Spectrum 19: The Best in Contemporary Fantastic Art | Cathy Fenner & Arnie Fenner | |
| 2015 | Spectrum 20: The Best in Contemporary Fantastic Art | Cathy Fenner & Arnie Fenner | |
| 2016 | Julie Dillon's Imagined Realms, Book 2: Earth and Sky | Julie Dillon | |
| 2017 | Walking Through the Landscape of Faerie | Charles Vess | |
| 2018 | The Art of the Pulps: An Illustrated History | Douglas Ellis, Ed Hulse & Robert Weinberg | |
| 2019 | The Books of Earthsea: The Complete Illustrated Edition | Ursula K. Le Guin, illustrated by Charles Vess | |
| 2020 | Spectrum 26: The Best in Contemporary Fantastic Art | John Fleskes | |
| 2021 | The Art of NASA: The Illustrations that Sold the Missions | Piers Bizony | |
| 2022 | The Art of Neil Gaiman & Charles Vess's Stardust | Charles Vess | |
| 2023 | Chivalry | Neil Gaiman, Colleen Doran | |
| 2024 | The Culture: The Drawings | Iain M. Banks | |
| 2025 | The Last Unicorn | Peter S. Beagle, Tom Kidd | |
| 2026 | The Space Cat | Nnedi Okorafor, Tana Ford | |
