= Distant Stars =

1981 collection of short stories by Samuel R. Delany

- Cover from the first edition
- Author: Samuel R. Delany
- Illustrator: John Pierard, John Collier, John Jude Palencar, Jeannette Adams, John Coffey, John Pound and Michael Sorkin
- Cover artist: Michael Whelan
- Language: English
- Genre: Science fiction, fantasy
- Publisher: Bantam Books
- Publication date: 1981
- Publication place: United States
- Media type: Print (paperback)
- Pages: 352
- ISBN: 0-553-01336-X

Distant Stars is a 1981 collection of science fiction and fantasy short stories by American writer Samuel R. Delany. Many of the stories originally appeared in the magazines The Magazine of Fantasy & Science Fiction, Algol and New Worlds, while the novella Empire Star was originally published as an Ace Double with Tree Lord of Imeten by Tom Purdom.

== Contents ==
- Of Doubts and Dreams
- "Prismatica"
- "Corona"
- "Empire Star"
- "Time Considered as a Helix of Semi-Precious Stones"
- "Omegahelm"
- "Ruins"
- "We, in Some Strange Power’s Employ, Move on a Rigorous Line"

== Sources ==
- "The Internet Speculative Fiction Database".
- Contento, William G. "Index to Science Fiction Anthologies and Collections". Archived from the original on December 30, 2007.
