= Jean-Baptiste Monge =

French fantasy author and illustrator (born 1971)

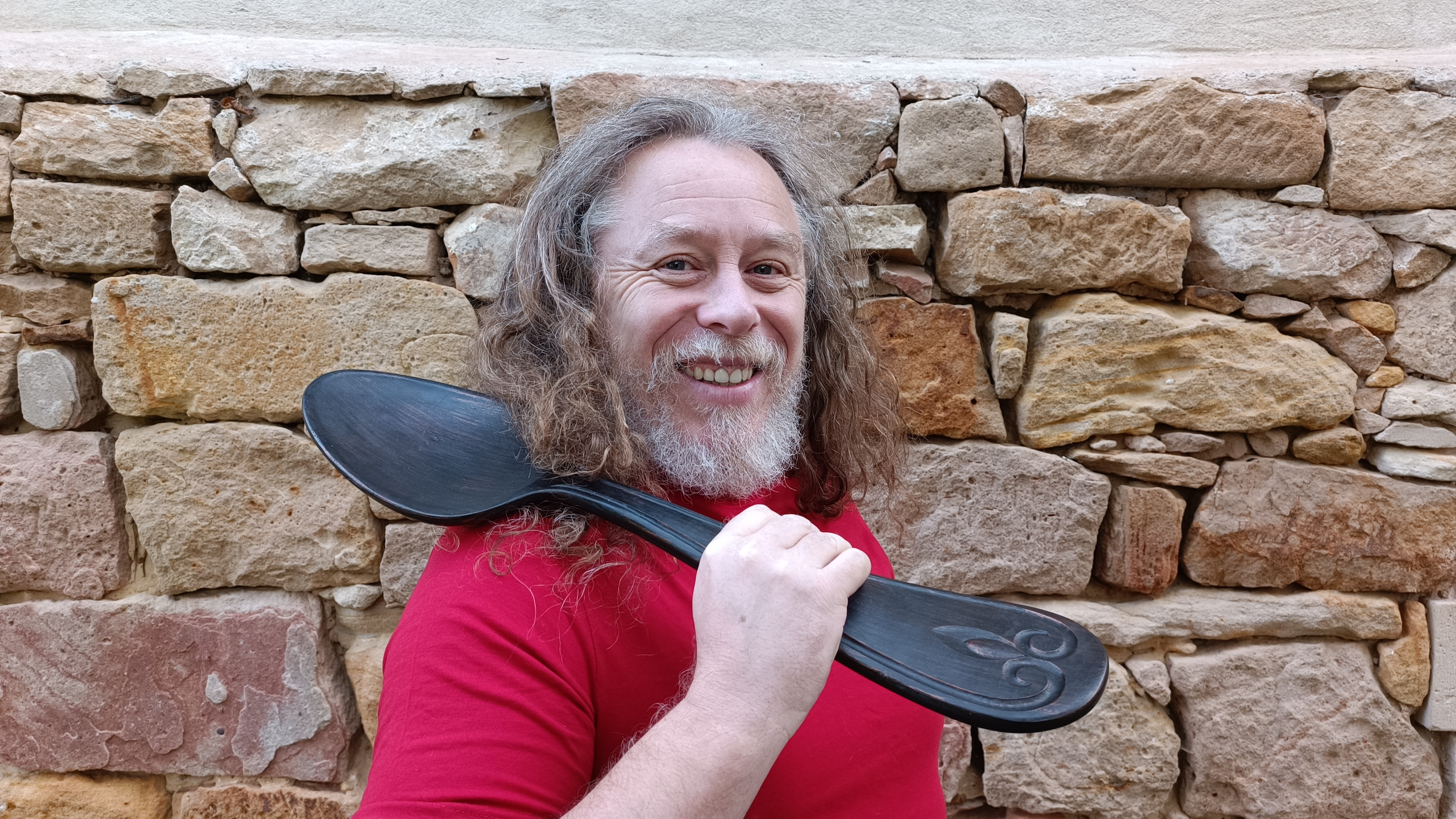
- Jean-Baptiste Monge proves his affection for fairies (2024)
- Born: 11 June 1971
- Occupation: Artist
- Website: https://www.jbmonge.com/

Jean-Baptiste Monge (born June 11, 1971, in Nantes) is a French-Canadian fantasy author and illustrator. Member of the Society of Illustrators of New York, he is passionate about wonderful worlds whether in literature, cinema, painting or illustration. After twelve years spent in Canada, he lives again in France, in Alsace.

== Biography ==
Jean-Baptiste Monge released his first illustrated work Halloween in 1996, in collaboration with Erlé Ferronnière published by Avis de tempête, which became the publishing house Au Bord des Continents and with whom he worked for 10 years.

In 1998, he completed his first solo book Baltimore et Redingote (Éditions Avis de Tempête). In October 2007, he traveled to Philadelphia (USA) for a Convention on Féerie (FaeriCon '07) with a view to preparing an English-language edition of A la recherche de Féerie Volumes I and II , from Sketchbook 2 as well as from Celtic Faeries. In 2007 and 2008, he collaborated on the collectives L'Univers des Dragons which will be published by the Galerie Daniel Maghen.

In October 2008, at the 9th International Festival of Science-Fiction of Nantes (Utopiales), he received the Wojtek Siudmak Prize for graphic design 2008 rewarding the cover illustration of the book Comptines assassines by Pierre Dubois published by Editions Hoëbeke.

In February 2009, the specialized collection SPECTRUM Fantastic Art awarded Jean-Baptiste Monge the Silver Award in the book illustration category for Dunlee Darnan (Celtic Faeries cover).

In October 2009, at the 10th Nantes International Science Fiction Festival (Utopiales), he received the 2009 Art&Fact Prize from the hands of James Gurney (Dinotopia) rewarding all of his work.

In May 2012, the event SPECTRUM Fantastic Art, which was held on May 19, 2012, in Kansas City, awarded to Jean-Baptiste Monge the Silver Award in the book illustration category for Ragnarok (published in l'Univers des Dragons, First Lights) and the Golden Award in the editorial category for Cormac Mac Cormic.

Jean-Baptiste trains alone in 3D and digital sculpture. He created the main characters of Ballerina (film, 2016) (Laurent Zeitoun, 2016), the preconcepts of Gnome Alone (Netflix, 2018) or even Fireheart (2022)

On April 8, 2023, he received the Troll d'or Coup de Cœur from the jury, at the Belgian festival Trolls et Légendes. He is the French representative of the Egair group (European guild for artificial intelligence regulation) to defend the rights of creators against AI. "The laws need to be changed, with illustrators in the discussions, so that neither internet users nor authors are harmed."

== Illustration works ==
- Halloween, in collaboration with Erlé Ferronnière, 1997.
- Baltimore & Redingote, 1999. ISBN 978-2-911684-08-1
- À la Recherche de Féerie tome I, in collaboration with Erlé Ferronnière, 2002. ISBN 978-2-911684-31-9
- À la Recherche de Féerie tome II, in collaboration with Erlé Ferronnière, 2004. ISBN 978-2-911684-41-8
- Carnet de croquis, archives de Féerie Tome I, 2006. ISBN 978-2-911684-47-0
- Celtic Faeries, prefaced par Pierre Dubois, 2007. ISBN 978-2-911684-56-2.
- L'Univers des Dragons, Premiers Feux, collective work, contribution for texts and illustrations, 2007. ISBN 978-2-9523826-5-6.
- Carnet de croquis, archives de Féerie Tome II, new images of Féerie along with unpublished works on Heroic Fantasy, 2008. ISBN 978-2-911684-59-3.
- Best of Faeries, portfolio including 15 images (format 30x40cm) ready for framing (5 never before published), selected among his best illustrations, 2008. ISBN 978-2-911684-71-5.
- L'Univers des Dragons, Deuxième souffle, collective work, contribution for illustrations, 2008. ISBN 978-2-35674-005-2.
- Sketchbook #1, 2015. ISBN 978-2-9815289-0-2.
- Celtic Faeries - The Secret Kingdom, (English version), 2016. ISBN 978-2-9815289-1-9.
- Sketchbook #2, 2019. ISBN 978-2-9815289-3-3.
- A World of Imagination, 2019. ISBN 978-2-9815289-4-0.
- SOTA: State of the Art, a Digital Art Anthology, 2023, 220 p., Caurette Editions (ISBN 978-2382890059). Collective artbook with Marc Brunnet, Ryan Church, Jonny Duddle, Nathan Fowkes, Goro Fujita, Simon Goinard, Raphaël Lacoste, Nikolai Lockertsen, Ian Mcque, Bastien Lecouffe Deharme, and Marc Simonetti.
- Celtic Faeries - The Secret Kingdom, (English and French version), 2024.

== Awards ==
- 2008. Prix Wojtek Siudmak aux Utopiales for the book cover illustration Comptines assassines.
- 2009. Silver Award au SPECTRUM Fantastic Art for book illustration: Dunlee Darnan (front cover of Celtic Faeries).
- 2009. Prix Art&Fact 2009 aux Utopiales for all of his work.
- 2012. Silver Award in the book illustration category for Ragnarok et Golden Award in the editorial category for Cormac Mac Cormic.
- 2014. Nomination to Hugo Awards.
- 2016. 1st prize in the Artstation challenge on the theme "Journey".
- 2018. Nomination au Locus Award.
- 2019. First prize for painting of the Fondation de la faune for Song of Winter.
- 2021. 1st prize for Richeson75 International painting, for Great Horned Owl, Small Work category.
- 2023. Troll d'or Jury's Favorite.
