= Stardust (Gaiman novel) =

1999 novel by Neil Gaiman

- Avon edition cover
- Author: Neil Gaiman
- Illustrator: Charles Vess
- Language: English
- Genre: Fantasy
- Publisher: DC Comics
- Publication date: 1999
- Publication place: United States
- Media type: Hardback, paperback, audiobook (read by the author)
- Pages: 256
- ISBN: 978-0-380-97728-4
- OCLC: 39313435

Stardust is a 1999 fantasy novel by British writer Neil Gaiman, usually published with illustrations by Charles Vess. Stardust has a different tone and style from most of Gaiman's prose fiction, being consciously written in the tradition of pre-Tolkien English fantasy, following in the footsteps of authors such as Lord Dunsany and Hope Mirrlees. It is concerned with the adventures of a young man from the village of Wall, which borders the magical land of Faerie.

In 2007, a film based on the novel was released to generally positive reviews. Gaiman has also occasionally made references to writing a sequel, or at least another book concerning the village of Wall.

The story begins in late April 1839, as John William Draper had just photographed the Moon and Charles Dickens was serialising Oliver Twist. The majority of the book takes place seventeen years later, starting around October 1856.

== Main characters ==
- Tristran Thorn: The book's main character (renamed "Tristan" in the movie adaptation), a half-Faerie, half-human boy raised by his father Dunstan Thorn and stepmother Daisy, whom he believes to be his mother. Tristran foolishly promises to retrieve a fallen star for the girl he wants to be his sweetheart, Victoria, and so unexpectedly finds the beautiful Yvaine.
- Yvaine: A fallen star, which Tristran vows to find and bring to Victoria Forester. In Faerie, stars are living creatures. Yvaine appears to be immortal, but not invulnerable. She is pursued by the Lilim and the surviving sons of the Lord of Stormhold, who want her for their own reasons. When Tristran realises his love for her, he abandons his courtship of Victoria Forester, and Yvaine marries him despite their inability to have children.
- Dunstan Thorn: Tristran's father. Main character in the beginning of the book. He visited the Wall Market to find a gift for his sweetheart Daisy Hempstock, and ended up fathering Tristran by Madame Semele's abused slave Faerie girl, Lady Una. Prior to this, he had bought a crystal snowdrop from this girl, and later gives the flower to Tristran. He is married to Daisy, who is the mother of Tristran's half-sister Louisa.
- Victoria Forester: A resident of Wall described as "the most beautiful girl for a hundred miles around". She is the daughter of Bridget Comfrey and Tommy Forester. Although Tristran is infatuated with her, she does not return his feelings and does not take his promise to bring her the fallen star seriously at first. She ultimately marries a man called Monday and thereby unwittingly frees Tristran's mother, Lady Una, from slavery.
- The Lord of Stormhold: The eighty-first Lord of Stormhold is an old man who rules Stormhold until his death. At the beginning of Stardust, he has four dead sons (Secundus, Quartus, Quintus, and Sextus) and three living ones (Primus, Tertius, and Septimus), in addition to his long-lost daughter Una. The sons are (un)imaginatively named, in Latin, Second, Fourth, Fifth and Sixth (all dead) and First, Third and Seventh (living). Daughter Una is named for a feminine form of the Latin unum, meaning one. The dead sons appear as ghostly observers, while the living sons constantly plot to kill each other to succeed their father as Lord of Stormhold.
- Lord Septimus: The youngest and most ruthless of the Lords of Stormhold. He is, by nature, a skilled assassin and has succeeded in murdering the majority of his family.
- Lord Primus: The oldest of the Lords of Stormhold. In comparison with his brothers, he is benevolent, compassionate and reasonable.
- Una: A cat-eared faerie girl of great beauty who works as a slave for Madame Semele until released by an improbable occurrence that fulfills the conditions of her debt. Una suffers constant abuse at the hands of Madame Semele, being beaten and called a "slattern". When not toiling for the witch-woman, she is kept in the form of a multicoloured bird chained by a silver thread to a Vardo. She is later revealed to be the Lady Una, only daughter of the Lord of Stormhold, and Tristran's birth mother.
- Madame Semele/Ditchwater Sal: A witch, and a member of the Sisterhood to which the Lilim belong. The witch-queen knew Semele as Ditchwater Sal when she was "a young chit of a thing". On their first encounter, Semele drugs the witch-queen's food with a magical substance that causes her to speak only the truth, thus forcing her to blurt out the truth of the fallen star. Semele plots to find the star first and restore her own youth, but the witch-queen curses her so that she will never perceive the star in any way.
- The Lilim: Three old women of great power. The eldest of the three is called "The Witch-Queen", though they are also called by this title collectively. They are never named, as they lost their names long ago, but the eldest adopts the alias "Morwanneg" at one point. The Lilim were once the beautiful queens of a magical kingdom of witches; when it was lost beneath the sea, centuries of age caught up with them. They seek the fallen star because, by consuming her heart, they will be granted centuries of youth and beauty. Using magic counteracts the effect; therefore with each spell cast by the witch-queen, she grows older and uglier. In the movie adaptation, they are named Lamia, Mormo, and Empusa, but none of their backstory is included.

== Plot ==
Every nine years, in the village of Wall in rural England, a market is held on the other side of a stone wall dividing the realm of Faerie from our world. In the early Victorian era, young Dunstan Thorn meets Una, a fairy enslaved by the witch Semele, at the market. Dunstan purchases a glass snowdrop from her with a kiss and, later that night, has sex with her in the woods. Months later, Dunstan receives a baby in a basket—his and Una's son, Tristran.

Eighteen years later, Tristran is infatuated with someone named Victoria Forester. In Faerie, the dying Lord of the castle of Stormhold throws his pendant out the window, declaring that the first of his three surviving sons—Primus, Tertius, and Septimus—to retrieve it will be his successor. The pendant flies upward and knocks a star out of the sky. While walking Victoria home, Tristran sees a falling star land in Faerie and vows to bring it to her. Victoria agrees to reward him with whatever he desires—including her hand in marriage—if he succeeds. Dunstan gives Tristran the snowdrop and enables him to pass the wall's guards by alluding to his fairy heritage.

Primus, Tertius and Septimus start searching for the pendant after their father's death. Septimus poisons Tertius at an inn. Meanwhile, the Lilim, a trio of ancient witches, learn of the fallen star and plan to eat its heart to regain their youth. The eldest of the Lilim, the witch-queen, is chosen to find the star and consumes the remains of their last star's heart.

Tristran meets a small man who gives him a silver chain, and a magic candle-stub which allows one to travel great distances quickly while it burns. Tristran uses the candle to reach the star, which turns out to be a young woman named Yvaine. Resolving to take her to Victoria, Tristran tethers Yvaine to him with the chain; however, the candle burns out before he can return. Tristran and Yvaine travel on foot. Yvaine escapes on a unicorn when Tristran unchains her and leaves in search of food. Meanwhile, the witch-queen encounters Semele, who deceives her into disclosing what her mission is. The enraged witch-queen puts a curse on her, which prevents her from seeing, touching or perceiving the star.

After discovering that Yvaine is gone, Tristran catches a ride in Primus's carriage. The witch-queen conjures a wayside inn to catch Yvaine, who is approaching. Yvaine arrives at the inn, followed by Tristran and Primus. The witch-queen attempts to poison Tristran but the unicorn warns him in time. He returns to the inn as the witch-queen murders Primus. Tristran escapes with Yvaine by forming another candle from the remnants of the magic candle. Septimus later arrives and finds Primus' body. He sets off looking for the witch-queen, now obligated to avenge Primus. Tristran and Yvaine end up stranded on a cloud miles above Faerie when the candle burns out but are rescued by the crew of a flying ship. There, Tristran expresses that he no longer intends to force Yvaine to accompany him. However, by the custom of her kind, because he has saved her life, she is nonetheless obliged to do so.

Upon parting company with the ship, Tristran and Yvaine set off for Wall. They encounter the cursed Semele. Unable to see Yvaine, Semele agrees to transport Tristran the rest of the way to Wall. Tristran obtains a promise from her that he will arrive there unharmed. This, however, does not prevent Semele using the snowdrop to transform him into a dormouse for the duration of the journey. Yvaine also rides in Semele's caravan, unbeknownst to Semele. Septimus, meanwhile, plots his attack on the witch-queen, who eventually kills him.

At the market, Tristran leaves Yvaine and crosses back into Wall to meet Victoria. Meanwhile, Yvaine realizes she has fallen in love with Tristran but learns that if she crosses the wall and leaves Faerie, she will be transformed into a piece of rock. A dismayed Victoria informs Tristran that she is already engaged to Robert Monday. She never believed he would go through with his quest, but is nonetheless willing to keep her promise and marry him. Tristran, not wishing to force Victoria into marrying him, reminds her that marriage was not the promise, but rather to give him anything he desired. He says that he desires that she marry Monday.

Tristran later returns to Yvaine at the market. She is delighted to learn that Victoria will marry someone else, and that Tristran reciprocates her love. Meanwhile, Una is freed as her enslavement ends when the moon loses her child (Yvaine), if it happens in a week when two Mondays come together (the marriage of Victoria and Monday). Una seeks out Tristran and Yvaine and reveals herself as Tristran's mother and the Lord of Stormhold's only daughter. As such, Tristran is the last male heir of Stormhold, and Yvaine presents him with the pendant, which she has been carrying. Yvaine is approached by the witch-queen, whose youth has run out and is now older than ever. Yvaine, no longer afraid, explains that her heart is no longer for the taking as she has given it to Tristran.

Una returns to Stormhold to rule in Tristan's stead, while he and Yvaine travel throughout Faerie. Years later, Tristran returns with Yvaine to Stormhold and assumes the lordship. When he grows old and dies, Yvaine continues to reign as Stormhold's immortal ruler.

== Publication history ==
Stardust was originally conceived by Gaiman and Vess as a "story book with pictures", created by both, to be published by American company DC Comics. During an interview to be included in the audio book, Neil Gaiman explained how one day while driving he had seen a wall on the side of the road and had conceived the idea of Faerie being behind the wall. This sparked an idea in Gaiman's head about an American novelist who moved to England where he would find out about this wall; at this time, the book was to be called Wall. Soon afterwards, Gaiman was nominated for a literary award, which he won, and at a celebratory party for the award he saw a shooting star and immediately came up with the idea of Stardust. Gaiman dragged Vess out of a party that he was at and outlined the plot to him and Vess agreed to do the illustrations. Initially, Stardust was released in 1997 as a prestige format four-issue mini-series. Stardust came out once a month in a square-bound, high-gloss booklet with high grade paper, high quality color and no advertisements.

Gaiman and Vess originally intended the story to be released complete, as a single book, which would better reproduce the painted illustrations of Vess and be a "story book" for all ages, and a release in this format was made in 1998. There was both a hardback (ISBN 1-56389-431-9) and a trade paperback edition (ISBN 1-56389-470-X). It is more accurately titled Neil Gaiman and Charles Vess's Stardust (Being a Romance within the Realms of Faerie). The hardback edition is quarter-bound in faux leather with the author's names, title, and several stars inlaid in foil. It also has reproductions of the serialized version's covers and many sketches by Vess. The trade paperback has a very different cover design and illustrations by Vess, and has subsequently been reprinted with another different cover design.

Gaiman retains the copyright to the text and in 1999 decided, encouraged by publisher Avon, to publish Stardust as a conventional novel in hardback without illustrations. There was also a subsequent UK hardcover edition, from Hodder Headline. The book also proved popular with readers of the "romance" genre, although it is generally considered part of the fantasy genre. Thus the paperback publication was originally given three different covers which when placed side by side had one background image and a different primary image including a handsome man holding a woman in a passionate embrace, although this cover concept was never used.

In 1999, Charles Vess's Green Man Press produced a portfolio as a benefit for Vess's wife, Karen, who had been injured in a car accident, titled A Fall of Stardust, which contained two chapbooks and a series of art plates. The first chapbook, written by Gaiman, comprised "Wall: A Prologue" short story, "Septimus' Triolet" poem, "Song of the Little Hairy Man", and "The Old Warlock's Reverie: A Pantoum" poem. The second chapbook was a short story entitled The Duke of Wellington Misplaces His Horse by Susanna Clarke. Art plates were illustrated by William Stout, Mike Mignola, Terri Windling, Bryan Talbot, Jill Thompson, Paul Chadwick, P. Craig Russell, Mark Crilley, Elizabeth Johns, Michael Zulli, Robin Mullins, Lisa Snellings, Terry Moore, Tony DiTerlizzi, Linda Medley, Lorenzo Mattotti, Zander Cannon, Dave McKean, Jeff Smith, Trina Robbins & Steve Leialoha, Gary Gianni, Janine Johnston, Stan Sakai, Michael Kaluta, Moebius, Rebecca Guay, Geof Darrow, Brian Froud, and Charles Vess. Several plates were coloured by Eric Olive. Todd Klein worked with Charles Vess to create the unique logo. Those who order this collection directly from Green Man Press received an additional art plate by Sergio Aragonés.

In July 2007, a new hardcover edition was published by DC's Vertigo imprint, containing approximately fifty pages of new material, including new artwork and information on the production of the book.

Gaiman had potential ideas for more books following on from Stardust, one called "Hellflier" set about 5 years later, and another called "Wall" set about 150 years later.

Musical comedian Tim Minchin expressed interest in the idea of adapting the story into a stage musical during a Facebook Live Q&A for The Guardian in October 2017 while discussing Matilda The Musical.

== Awards ==
The original DC Comics series was nominated for the Comics Buyer's Guide Fan Awards for Favorite Limited Series for 1998 and 1999. The collected edition of the series was also nominated for the Comics Buyer's Guide Fan Award for Favorite Reprint Graphic Album for 1999.

In 1999, the Mythopoeic Society awarded it the Mythopoeic Fantasy Award for Adult Literature. The novel was nominated for the Locus Award that same year. In 2000, it received an Alex Award from the American Library Association.

== Adaptations ==
BBC Radio 4 produced a two-part radio adaptation first broadcast 17 December 2016, dramatized and directed by Dirk Maggs and featuring Eleanor Bron as narrator, Matthew Beard as Tristan, and Sophie Rundle as Yvaine.

A film starring Claire Danes as Yvaine, Charlie Cox as Tristan, Michelle Pfeiffer as the witch queen Lamia, with cameos by Robert De Niro and Henry Cavill and narration by Sir Ian McKellen was released in 2007.
