= Charles Vess =

American fantasy and comics artist (born 1951)

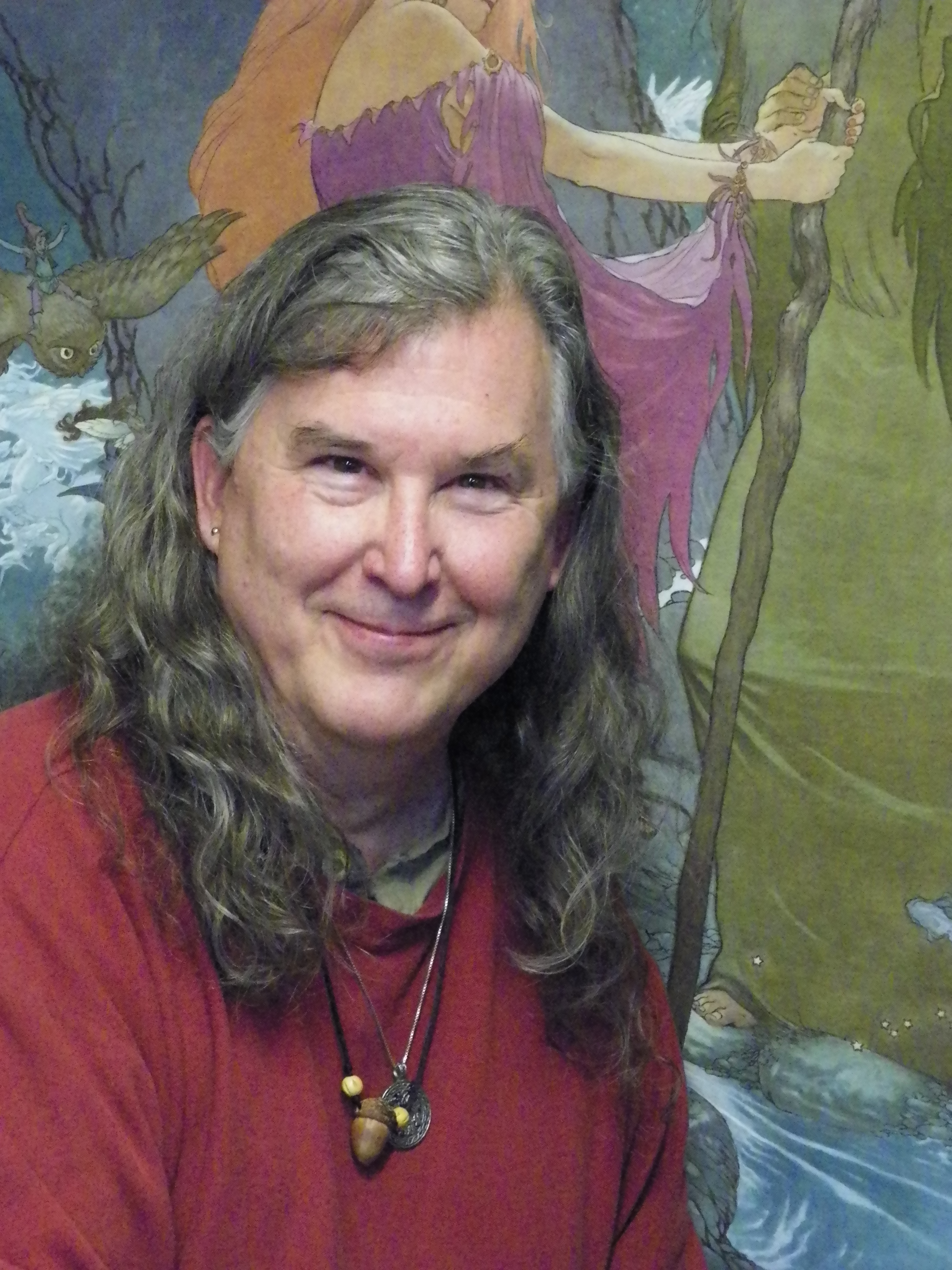
- Charles Vess in his studio, Green Man Press, in Abingdon, Virginia.
- Born: June 10, 1951 (age 75)
- Area: Artist
- Notable works: The Book of Ballads and Sagas; Sandman; Stardust
- Collaborators: Neil Gaiman, Terri Windling and Ellen Datlow, Charles de Lint
- Awards: Hugo Awards: 2019 Best Professional Artist, Best Art Book; Locus Awards: 2019, 2023 Best Artist, Best Art Book; Inkpot Award: 1990; Eisner Award: 1991, 1997, 2002; World Fantasy Award: 1991, 1999; Comic Creators' Guild 1993; Silver Award (Comics Industry) 1995

Charles Vess (born June 10, 1951) is an American fantasy artist and comics artist who has specialized in the illustration of myths and fairy tales. His influences include British "Golden Age" book illustrator Arthur Rackham, Czech Art Nouveau painter Alphonse Mucha, and comic-strip artist Hal Foster, among others. Vess has won several awards for his illustrations. Vess' studio, Green Man Press, is located in Abingdon, Virginia.

He has received numerous awards and honors for his work including the 2019 and 2023 Locus Award for Best Artist and the 2019 Hugo Awards for Best Professional Artist and Best Art Book for The Books of Earthsea: The Complete Illustrated Edition.

In 1991, his work with Neil Gaiman on the Sandman comic short story "A Midsummer Night's Dream" became the first comic to win the World Fantasy Award.

== Biography ==
=== Early life and career ===
Charles Vess began drawing comic art as a child. He graduated with a BFA from Virginia Commonwealth University (VCU) in 1974. While at VCU, Vess' comics appeared in the Fan Free Funnies, a comic tabloid published by the student newspaper. His first professional position was as a commercial animator for Candy Apple Productions in Richmond, Virginia, which he held for approximately two years.

In 1976 he moved to New York City and became a freelance illustrator. He contributed illustrations to publications including Heavy Metal, Klutz Press (now an imprint of Scholastic Press), and National Lampoon. One notable publication from this early period was The Horns of Elfland (ISBN 0-915822-25-3) published by Archival Press in 1979, which Vess wrote and illustrated.

From 1980 to 1982 Vess worked as an art instructor at the Parsons School of Design in New York City. During that period, his work appeared in one of the first major museum exhibitions of science fiction and fantasy art, held at the New Britain Museum of American Art in 1980.

Drawing Down the Moon: The Art of Charles Vess (2011). Cover art by Vess.

=== Mainstream fantasy ===
By the late 1980s Vess had found a niche in the world of fantasy comic art with publications such as The Raven Banner: A Tale of Asgard written by Alan Zelenetz and published by Marvel Comics in 1985, The Book of Night, published by Dark Horse Comics in 1987, and "The Warriors Three Saga" in Marvel Fanfare #34–37 (Sept. 1987–April 1988). He painted the cover of the debut issue of Web of Spider-Man (April 1985), wrote and drew a backup story in The Amazing Spider-Man #277 (June 1986), and crafted the Spider-Man: Spirits of the Earth graphic novel (1990). In 1991 he illustrated the official comic-book adaptation of Steven Spielberg’s Hook and had an eleven issue run (#129–139) as cover artist of Swamp Thing by DC Comics in 1993.

=== Collaborations with Neil Gaiman ===
In 1990, Vess began one of his best-known collaborations to date, with writer Neil Gaiman. He illustrated "The Land of Summer's Twilight", one of the four episodes in the original The Books of Magic mini-series, and worked on three issues of Gaiman's critically acclaimed The Sandman series. Sandman #19 ("A Midsummer Night's Dream") is a meta-fictional adaptation of William Shakespeare's play and in 1991, that issue won the World Fantasy Award for Best Short Story, the only comic book to hold the honor, as award organizers subsequently amended the rules to specifically exclude comics. Vess contributed eight drawings for a prose-based inset that appeared in Sandman #62 ("The Kindly Ones: 6") and illustrated the final issue of the series, Sandman #75, a second Shakespeare adaptation ("The Tempest"). He drew the covers for the Books of Faerie spin-off series Molly's Story (1999).

==== Stardust ====
Between 1997 and 1998 the collaboration between Vess and Gaiman continued in the four-part series Stardust, a prose novella to which Vess contributed 175 paintings. The series was collected and published in trade paperback form by DC Comics' Vertigo imprint. Stardust won an Alex Award from the American Library Association. It received a Mythopoeic Award, and Vess was given the 1999 World Fantasy Award for Best Artist for his work on the series.

In 1999, Vess's own Green Man Press produced a portfolio as a benefit for his wife Karen, injured in a car accident, titled A Fall of Stardust, which contained two chapbooks and a series of art plates.

==== Blueberry Girl ====
Between 2004 and 2007 Vess adapted a poem by Neil Gaiman into a children's book, Blueberry Girl. The book was published by HarperCollins in 2009.(ISBN 0-06-083808-6)

=== Tales and Sagas ===
Beginning in 1995 Vess self-published a biannual series of comics entitled The Book of Ballads and Sagas through his Green Man Press. In this series Vess illustrated adaptations of traditional Scottish and English ballads written by a variety of contributors, including Emma Bull, Charles de Lint, Neil Gaiman, Sharyn McCrumb, Jeff Smith, and Jane Yolen. Issues 1-4 were collected and published as Ballads in 1997. The work was reprinted as a hardback by Tor Books in 2004 with additional material, including an introduction by Terri Windling.

=== Collaborations with Terri Windling and Ellen Datlow ===
Vess has illustrated a series of anthologies edited by Terri Windling and Ellen Datlow, published by Viking Press. They are: The Green Man: Tales from the Mythic Forest (2002), The Faery Reel: Tales from the Twilight Realm (2004), and The Coyote Road: Trickster Tales (2007).

=== Collaborations with Charles de Lint ===
Vess worked with longtime friend and writer Charles de Lint on at least half a dozen publications, including Seven Wild Sisters (Subterranean Press, 2002) and related projects A Circle of Cats (Viking, 2003), and Medicine Road (Subterranean Press, 2005, as well as a later edition by Tachyon Publications, 2009), along with others mentioned above. In 2004 Vess did both a color cover and front page illustration and additional black and white interior illustrations for a 20th anniversary (signed, limited) edition of Moonheart, by de Lint (Subterranean Press).

=== Collaboration with Ursula K. Le Guin ===
Vess was chosen by Saga Press to illustrate The Books of Earthsea: The Complete Illustrated Edition (2018), a compilation of all five Earthsea novels, as well as short stories, including some previously unpublished works. During the process, Vess had a chance to work closely with Le Guin, translating her vision onto the page. Vess described their work together as a true collaboration, saying in 2018 "... I don’t think she believed me when I said I wanted to collaborate. But, after four years and lord knows how many emails, she sent me a copy of her latest book, her essay book, and her dedication to me was ‘To Charles, the best collaborator ever.’" The book was published in October 2018, and won a 2019 Locus Award for Best Art Book and a 2019 Hugo Award for Best Art Book.

=== Collaboration with Joanne Harris ===
In 2021 Vess illustrated Joanne Harris' Honeycomb; a collection of 100 interconnected fairy stories forming a mosaic novel. Harris describes the process of working with Vess as follows:

Through the lens of Charles' art, the Silken Folk of my stories are neither entirely human, nor overly insectile: and their beauty is slightly monstrous, yet altogether bewitching. I think illustrations give a different dimension to a text: translating them from simple print into the stuff of dreams (and nightmares). In the case of Honeycomb, Charles has brought my dreams to life. I can think of no finer magic than this.

== Influences ==
In a 2004 interview, Vess cited among many artistic influences, beginning with the 19th-century British book illustrator Arthur Rackham, saying,

I discovered his work while I was still in college and immediately fell completely in love with it. His art, unlike a lot of other artists that I discovered at the same time (Maxfield Parrish, Frank Frazetta, etc.) I've never grown tired of. I always find myself learning new things every time I study it. But there are many others that have influenced me, among them: the Swedish illustrator John Bauer, Howard Pyle, the 19th-century German illustrator Hermann Vogel, Alphonse Mucha (the father of Art Nouveau), Willy Pogany, Kay Nielsen, W. H. Robinson, Hal Foster and Alfred Bestall (the British illustrator of the long running Rupert Bear series). Among the living I count Michael Kaluta, Alan Lee, Brian Froud, Lizebeth Zwerger and Terri Windling.

== Exhibitions ==
Starting in 1989 with "The Art of Fantasy and Science Fiction" at the Delaware Art Museum in Wilmington, Delaware, a series of gallery exhibitions have featured Vess's artwork. The gallery show "Storyteller" appeared in 1992 at Frameworks Gallery in Bristol, Virginia. The following year he showed work under the title "The Mythic Garden" at the Open Air Birch Garden in Devon, England, and "The Magic" at Repartee Gallery in Park City, Utah.

In 1994, after he moved to southwestern Virginia, a local museum asked Vess to organize a show which became The DreamWeavers: a travelling exhibition of 15 fantasy artists from a variety of fields including children's book illustrators Jerry Pinkney, Dennis Nolan, Gennady Spirin, Ruth Sanderson and David Wisnieski; comic book illustrators Michael Kaluta, and Vess himself; science fiction/fantasy book jacket artists Dawn Wilson and James Gurney; commercial book illustrators Scott Gustafson, Brian Froud, Alan Lee and Alicia Austin, and fine artist Terri Windling. The show ran from fall 1994 through summer 1995.

Since that time Vess's work has appeared in gallery showings and museum exhibitions including:

- "The Tempest" Spring 1996. Four Color Images Gallery, New York City
- "Stardust" Spring - Summer 1998 Cartoon Art Museum, San Francisco.
- "Good Goddess Arts Exhibition", Johnson City, and Abingdon, USA, March 1998, 1999, and 2000.
- "Into the Light," Comic Art Symposium, Avilles, Spain, Fall 2000.
- "Fantasy, Visionaries of the Fantastic" Turin, Italy, Spring 2002.
- "A Circle of Cats," 153W Bookstore & Gallery, Abingdon, Summer 2003
- "Ancient Spirit, Modern Voice," (Co-curator and participating artist) The DeFoor Centre, Atlanta, Spring 2004.
- "Earthsea Imagined" Massillon Museum, Massillon, Ohio, Spring 2018.

== Awards ==
- Inkpot Award: For excellence in comic art, 1990.
- World Fantasy Award: Best short story, 1991 for Sandman #19, by Neil Gaiman and Vess.
- Eisner Award: Best Single Issue, 1991 for Concrete Celebrates Earth Day, by Paul Chadwick, Vess, and Jean "Moebius" Giraud.
- Comic Creators' Guild: 1993 Best Cover (Dark Horse Presents #75).
- Silver Award (Comics) 1995, Spectrum Annual of Imaginative Art.
- Eisner Award: Best Penciler/Inker, 1996 for The Book of Ballads and Sagas and Sandman #75.
- World Fantasy Award: Best Artist, 1998 for Stardust, written by Neil Gaiman.
- World Horror Convention: Artist Guest of Honor
- Eisner Award: Best Painter/Multimedia Artist, 2002 for Rose, written by Jeff Smith
- World Fantasy Award: Best Artist, 2010.
- Hugo Award for Best Professional Artist, 2019
- The Hugo Awards: Best Art Book, 2019 for The Books of Earthsea: The Complete Illustrated Edition, illustrated by Charles Vess, written by Ursula K. Le Guin (Saga Press /Gollancz)
- Locus Awards: Best Artist, 2019
- Locus Awards: Best Art Book, 2019 for The Books of Earthsea: The Complete Illustrated Edition, illustrated by Charles Vess, written by Ursula K. Le Guin (Saga Press /Gollancz)
- Locus Awards: Best Artist, 2023 Winner.

== Comics bibliography ==
=== Aardvark-Vanaheim ===
- Cerebus #196 (1995)

=== Archival Press ===
- The Horns of Elfland (1979)

=== Cartoon Book ===
- Rose #1–3 (2000–2002)

=== Dark Horse Comics ===
- Book of Night #1–2 (1987)
- Dark Horse Presents #75, 78 (1993)

=== DC Comics ===
- The Big Book Of Grimm #1 (1999)
- The Books of Magic #3 (1991)
- The Dreaming #47 (2000)
- Fables: 1001 Nights of Snowfall HC (2006)
- Neil Gaiman and Charles Vess' Stardust #1–4 (1997–1998)
- Promethea #4 (1999)
- Sandman #19, 62, 75 (1990–1996)

=== Green Man Press ===
- The Book of Ballads and Sagas #1–4 (1995–1997)

=== HM Communications ===
- Heavy Metal vol. 1 #12, vol. 2 #5, vol. 2 #6, vol. 3 #7, vol. 8 #6 (1978–1984)

=== Marvel Comics ===
- The Amazing Spider-Man #277 (1986)
- Conan the Barbarian #163 (1984)
- Conan the King #20 (1984)
- Epic Illustrated #5, 8–10, 16, 21–22, 24, 27 (1981–1984)
- Heroes for Hope Starring the X-Men #1 (1985)
- Hook Magazine #1 (1992)
- Kull the Conqueror #4 (1984)
- Marvel Fanfare #6 (Doctor Strange); #13 (Tales of Asgard); #34–37 (Warriors Three) (1983–1988)
- Marvel Graphic Novel #15 ("The Raven Banner") (1985)
- Prince Valiant #1–4 (1994–1995)
- Spider-Man: Spirits of the Earth HC (1990)
- Thor #400 (1989)

=== Renaissance Press ===
- The Forbidden Book #1 (2001)

=== Spiderbaby Grafix & Publications ===
- Taboo #1, 4 (1988–1990)
