= Jeff Miracola =

American illustrator

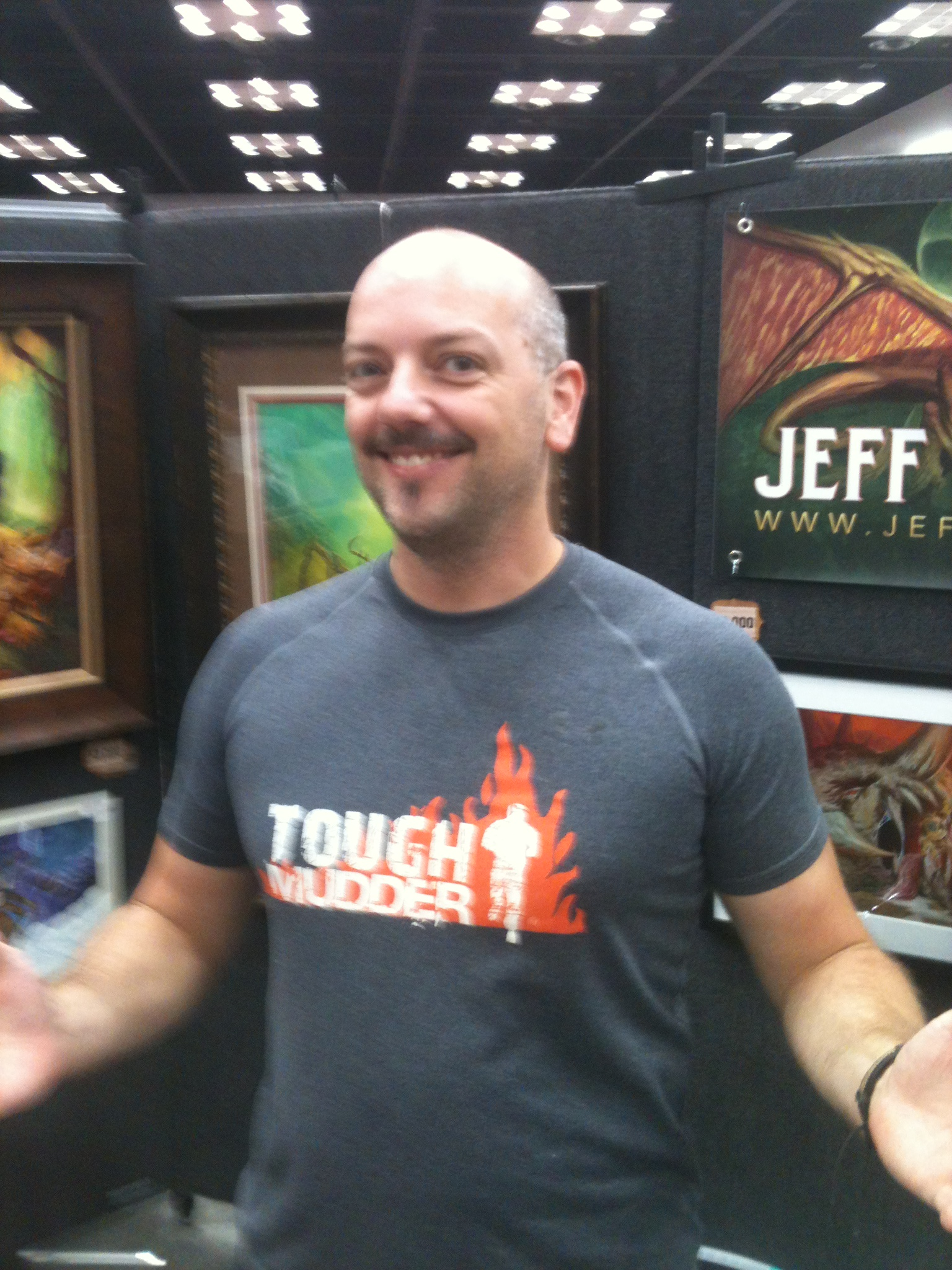
- Born: October 10, 1971 (age 54); Baltimore, Maryland, U.S.

Jeff Miracola (born October 10, 1971) is an American fantasy artist, children's book artist, and illustrator.

Miracola created illustrations for the children's book, Welcome to Monster Isle, along with children's author Oliver Chin in 2008. Miracola's illustrations have also appeared in ImagineFX magazine, The Duelist magazine, Advanced Photoshop magazine, and on a Target Corporation gift card. In the gaming industry, he is best known for his work in the collectible card game Magic: The Gathering, the Shadowrun role-playing game and collectible card game, as well as the Dungeons & Dragons role-playing game. Miracola also created illustrations for the Electronic Arts video game, Mini-Golf, available on the Apple iPod.

== Early life and education ==
Miracola was born in Baltimore, Maryland in 1971, the second of two children.

Miracola grew up in Milwaukee, Wisconsin where he attended the Milwaukee High School of the Arts. During his high school years, a friend introduced him to the work of Frank Frazetta, Boris Vallejo, Berni Wrightson, Michael Kaluta, Gerald Brom and Jeff Jones, all of whom he cites as creative influences. In 1991, he attended college at the Milwaukee Institute of Art & Design, but left college after two years to begin a freelance art career.

== Career ==
Miracola began his illustration career in 1993, working as a freelance artist for Wizards of the Coast, FASA Corporation, Steve Jackson Games, White Wolf Game Studios, and many other companies in the role-playing game and collectible card game industry. He also did conceptual toy design for Warner Bros. Batman Beyond and Nickelodeon's Animorphs, through Hasbro, Inc. In 2008, Miracola collaborated with author Oliver Chin to create the children's book Welcome to Monster Isle, which is targeted at ages 4 to 8. His work received a favorable review in The Horn Book Guide to Children's and Young Adult Books, with the critic referring to the "slick illustrations".

== Personal life ==
Miracola works and lives in Wisconsin with his wife and three children.

== Works ==
=== Books ===
- Welcome to Monster Isle, 2008
- Mail Me Art: Going Postal with the World's Best Illustrators and Designers
- World of Warcraft: The Art of the Trading Card Game
- Expose Vol. 4, Ballistic Publishing
- Spectrum: The Best in Contemporary Fantastic Art, Volumes 2, 3,4,5, and 15
- The Art of Magic: the Gathering
- High Tech & Low Life: The Art of Shadowrun
- 30 Years of Adventure: A Celebration of Dungeons & Dragons

=== Magazines ===
- ImagineFX magazine (Future Publishing)
- Advanced Photoshop Magazine (Imagine Publishing)
- Dragon Magazine (Wizards of the Coast)
- The Duelist magazine (Wizards of the Coast)

=== Card games ===
- Magic: the Gathering (Wizards of the Coast)
- World of Warcraft (Upper Deck)
- Rage (White Wolf)
- Battletech (FASA)
- Shadowrun (FASA)
- Deadlands (Five Rings Publishing Group)
- Judge Dredd (Target Games)
- Vampire: The Eternal Struggle (Wizards of the Coast)

=== Video games ===
- Mini-Golf (Electronic Arts)
- Hearthstone (Blizzard Entertainment)

== Additional sources ==
- Spectrum: The Best in Contemporary Fantastic Art, Volume 2
- Spectrum: The Best in Contemporary Fantastic Art, Volume 3
- Spectrum: The Best in Contemporary Fantastic Art, Volume 4
- Spectrum: The Best in Contemporary Fantastic Art, Volume 5
- Spectrum: The Best in Contemporary Fantastic Art, Volume 15
- The Art of Magic: The Gathering
- World of Warcraft: The Art of the Trading Card Game
