= John Jude Palencar =

American artist

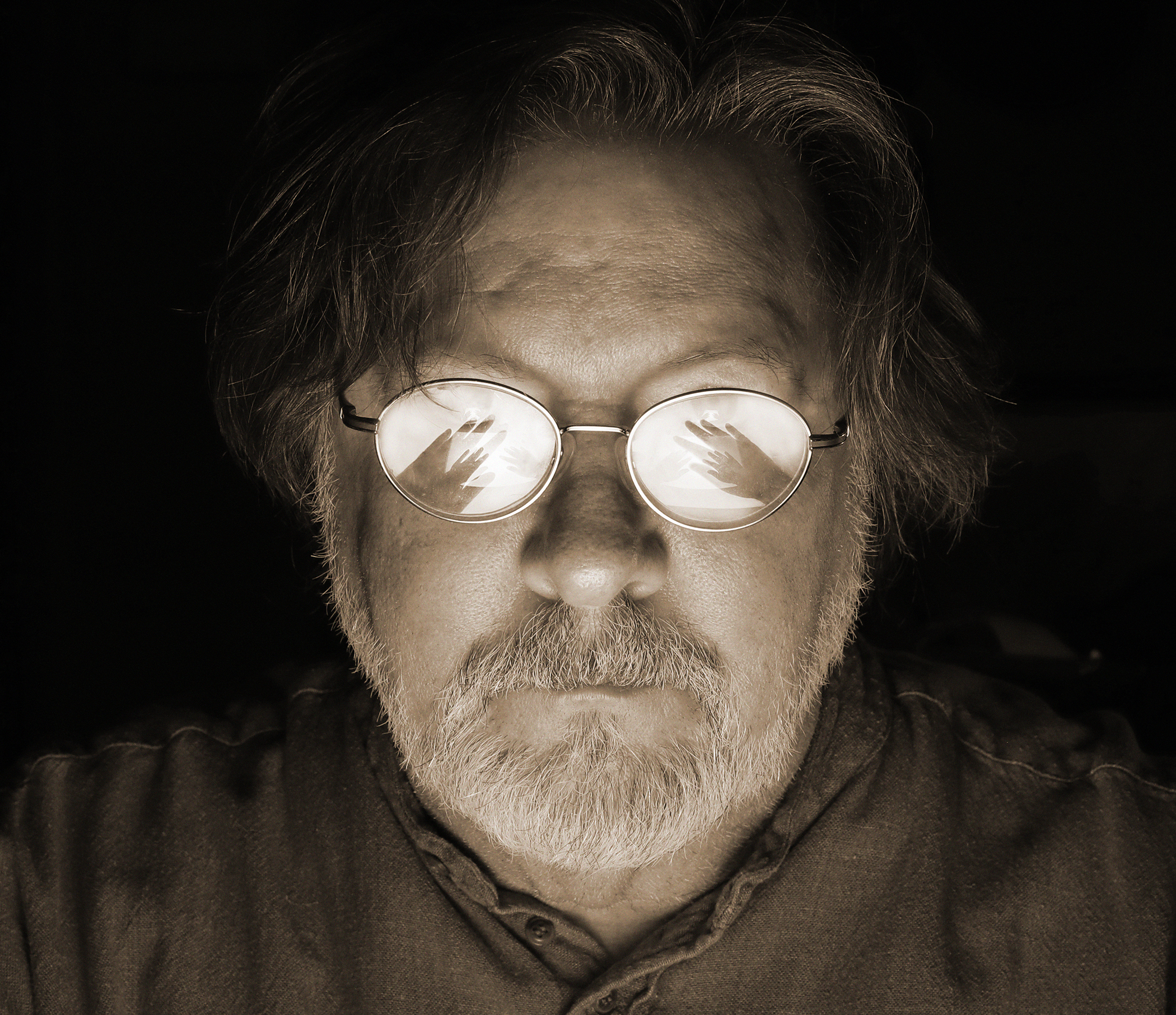
- Palencar self portrait 2025
- Born: February 26, 1957 (age 69); Fairview Park, Ohio, US
- Known for: Painting and illustration
- Awards: Hamilton King Award, 2010; Spectrum Grand Master Award, 2008

John Jude Palencar (born February 26, 1957) is an American illustrator and fine artist who specializes in works of fantasy, science fiction, and horror. In 2010, he was given the Hamilton King Award.

== Early life ==
Palencar was born February 26, 1957, in Fairview Park, Ohio. He developed an interest in the subject matter of horror and science fiction early in life; dressing up as an alien with a homemade custom latex masks and exhibiting a fascination in both scaring others and being scared himself. In the third grade, his family moved to Middleburg Heights, Ohio. He won his first award in art in fifth grade with a three-colour block print for the Cleveland Plain Dealer’s newspaper calendar contest. He went on to attended Midpark High School. It was in high school that the artist came under the art training of Frederick C. Graff, who up until today is an established award winning artist, primarily in watercolor. After winning numerous art awards and selling a few paintings in high school, Palencar decided to pursue a career in art. He attended the Columbus College of Art and Design (CCAD) on scholarship, receiving a BFA degree in 1980. During his college years he worked for the American Greetings Card Company and freelanced, establishing a list of regional and national clients in editorial, advertising, and corporate art. As a senior at CCAD, he won the top cash award at the Society of Illustrators Student Exhibition and was also presented with a scholarship to the Illustrators Workshop held in Paris, France.

== Illustration career ==
While still in college at Columbus College of Art and Design, Palencar exhibited work at the Society of Illustrators and the work on display attracted the attention of Byron Preiss. The result would be an early and prominent assignment for the artist in 1982 with the commission to illustrate The Secret, a puzzle book produced by Byron Preiss and published by Bantam Books. The illustrations for the book depict the visual components of 12 puzzles, each of which lead the reader on a treasure hunt. Preiss had hidden ceramic boxes, each redeemable for a jewel, in twelve cities and, to date, only three of the puzzles have been solved and the jewels recovered.

Palencar's first introduction to illustrating for fantasy and speculative fiction came shortly after college when working for Time-Life Books on The Enchanted World Series. The young artist would contribute to many books in the series, including Legends of Valor (1984), Ghosts (1984), and Night Creatures (1985).

His work has since appeared on hundreds of book covers for just about every major publisher in the U.S. and in over thirty countries around the world. The artist has created cover art for such authors as H. P. Lovecraft, Ursula Le Guin, Marion Zimmer Bradley, P.D. James, Charles de Lint, R.L. Stine, Octavia Butler, David Brin, and Stephen King. New York Times best-selling author Christopher Paolini, a fan of John's work, named the lead character's birthplace "Palancar Valley" after John in his NY Times Bestseller, Eragon for which John painted the cover as well as created the type treatment that would be used for the remaining three books in the series. Stephen King owns three works by the artist from the Dark Tower series.

Palencar has also created editorial illustrations for Time Magazine, Smithsonian Magazine, National Geographic, and Nat. Geo. Television as well as worked on entertainment projects for Lucas Arts, Paramount Pictures, and Vivendi Universal.

In 2000, Palencar became the Artist in Residence at the Cill Rialaig Arts Centre, in County Kerry, Ireland.

In 2007, Underwood Books published Origins:The Art of John Jude Palencar, a 128-page overview of the artist's work with a foreword by Christopher Paolini.

In 2008, Palencar was awarded the Spectrum Award for Grand Master which is an annual award presented to an artist who has worked for at least twenty years at a consistently high level of quality and has left his or her mark on the field of contemporary science fiction, fantasy, and horror artwork.

In 2012, Tor Books editor David Hartwell was passing by the Tor art department and noticed a painting by Palancar leaning against the wall. Hartwell asked art director Irene Gallo what the painting was for and was told that the work had no specific commission. Hartwell used the work to initiate The Palencar Project, in which five writers, L. E. Modesitt Jr., Gene Wolf, Michael Swanwick, Gregory Benford, and James Morrow all wrote short stories based on the painting. The same painting would later be used as the cover for The One-Eyed Man by L. E. Modesitt Jr.

The George R.R. Martin 2019 A Song of Ice and Fire wall calendar was illustrated by Palencar.

== Working process ==
Initial ideas are sketched quickly to provide an art director with a general idea of how a finished work might appear. Once an approval for an idea is in hand, the artist creates a detailed rendering in pencil with subtle shading on a plate finish board. The final Palencar paintings are executed in acrylic, but in a watercolor fashion, in which initial thin layers are laid down as a wash first. Multiple layers and subtle colors are then woven together and then the artists begins to introduce opaque and semi opaque washes. Working in this manner borrows technical approaches from oil, watercolor, and egg tempera mediums.

== Personal life ==
Palencar lives in Medina County, Ohio with his wife Lee. The couple have two boys, Ian and Kit. Kit, also an artist, teaches drawing and painting at the University of Akron. Palencar maintains a personal collection of skulls and articulated skeletons that serve as inspiration and reference for many paintings.

== Exhibitions ==
Palencar has exhibited in numerous group shows in galleries, colleges, and universities throughout the United States.

=== Solo ===
- John Jude Palencar: Alt-Reverie, Butler Institute of American Art, 2024
- Between Worlds, Canton Museum of Art, 2019
- University of the Arts, Richard C. von Hess Gallery, 2008
- Laguna College of Art and Design, 2005

=== Group ===
- La Mars Art Center, Exhibition of the American Watercolor Society, 2020
- Society of Illustrators, Masters of The Fantastic, 2019
- Schomburg Center for Research in Black Culture, Unveiling Visions: The Alchemy of the Black Imagination, curated by John Jennings and Reynaldo Anderson, 2015
- Kosart Studios & Gallery, Maleficium: Dark Art Exhibition, 2015
- Butler Institute of American Art, 2013
- Allentown Art Museum, At the Edge: Art of the Fantastic, curated by Patrick and Jeannie Wilshire, 2012
- Nucleus Gallery, At the Mountains of Madness:A Tribute to the Writings of Lovecraft, 2010
- Images of Ireland, National Museum, Dublin

== Awards ==
- The Midyear Prize: The Butler Institute of Art, 2024
- Gold Medal, American Water Color Society, for The Dark Line, 2020
- Gold Medal (Institutional), Spectrum 27, 2020, for The Stranger: The Seventh Faith
- Silver Medal (Institutional), Spectrum 26, 2019, for The Nights Watch
- Hamilton King Award, Society of Illustrators, 2010, for cover of Muse and Reverie by Charles de Lint
- Gold Medal, Society of Illustrators, 2010
- Spectrum Grand Master Award, 2008
- Gold Medal (book), Spectrum Awards 1996, for Blood Debt
- Gold Medal (book), Spectrum Awards 1995, for Becoming Human
- Chesley Awards Winner 2006, 2001, 2000, 1999, 1995
