= Michael J. Deas =

American painter and illustrator

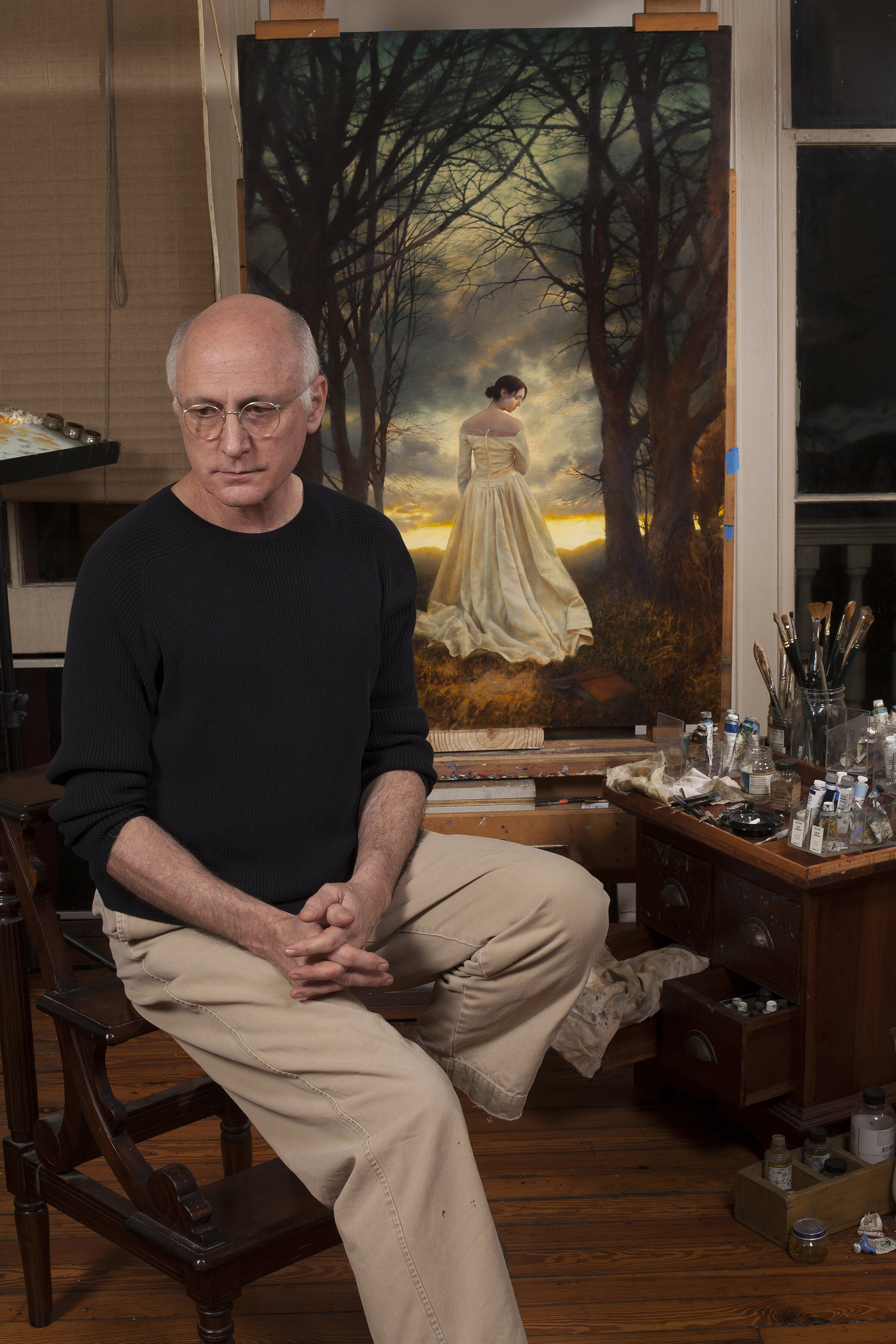
- Michael Deas in front of his painting, The Memory of Things Done and Said (oil on panel, 49.5 x 34.5", 2015–2017), photographed by Thom Bennett
- Born: Michael J. Deas; Norfolk, Virginia, U.S.
- Education: Pratt Institute
- Occupations: Painter, illustrator, instructor
- Years active: 1980–Present
- Known for: Painting, illustrating, teaching
- Awards: Society of Illustrators' Hamilton King Award (2004)

Michael J. Deas (born 1956) is an American realist painter and illustrator whose work is known for both its technical skill and "a growing sense of grace and serenity". He is cited in Roger and Walt Reed's definitive history of illustration, The Illustrator in America. He works primarily in oils and graphite. Deas began creating illustrations while studying fine art in New York during the 1970s. He has since gone on to paint six covers for Time magazine and 25 stamps for the US Postal Service, including likenesses of Tennessee Williams (1995), Marilyn Monroe (1995), F. Scott Fitzgerald (1996), Meriwether Lewis (2004), George H. W. Bush (2019) and Ruth Bader Ginsburg (2023). Other notable works include the US poster for Werner Herzog's film, Aguirre, the Wrath of God, and the cover art for the 20th-anniversary edition of Anne Rice's book, Interview with the Vampire. His most recognizable work is his luminous redesign of the Columbia Pictures logo, painted [with oils] in 1991 and in continuous use since that time.

== Career ==
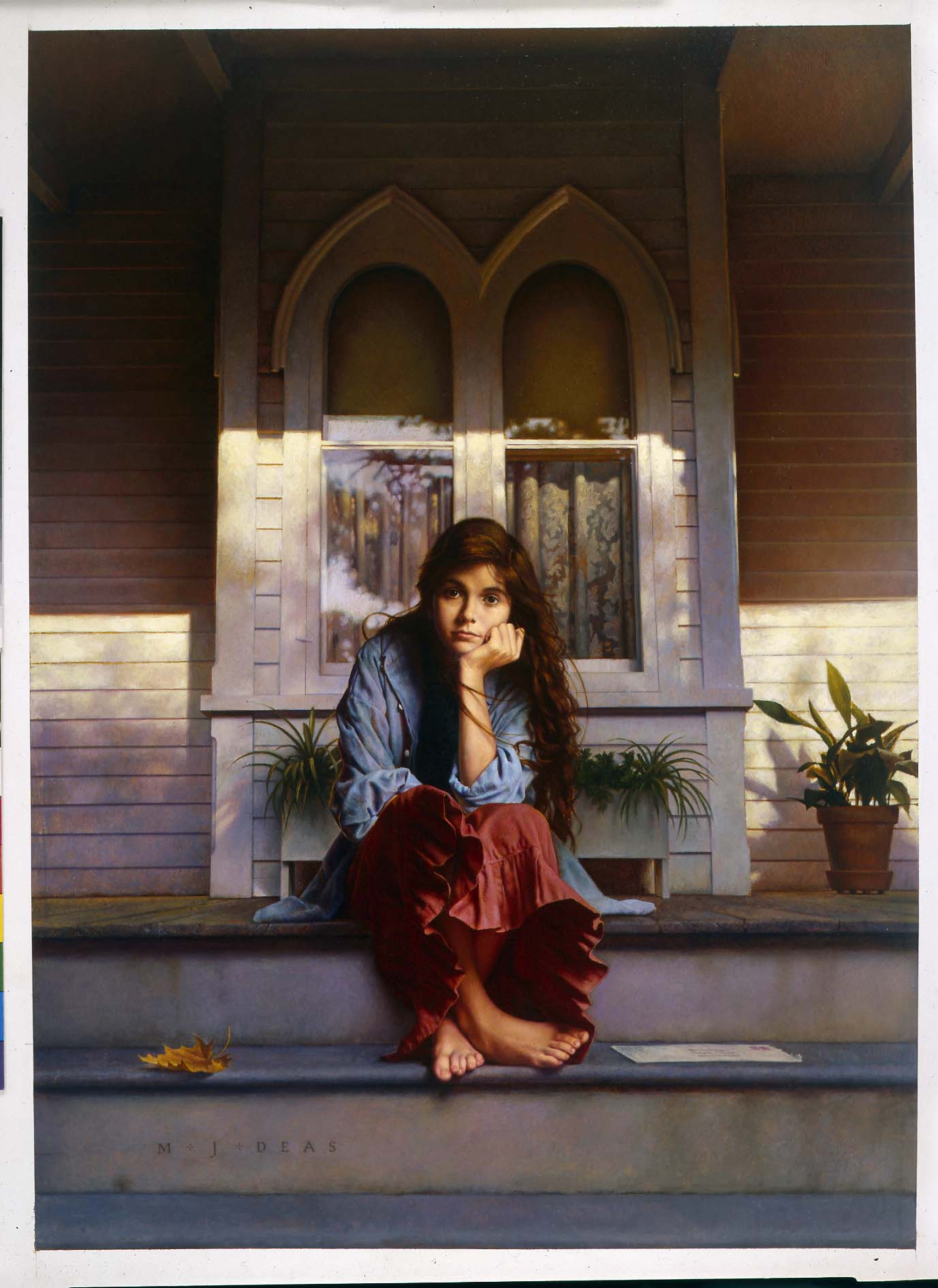
The Letter (oil on panel, 22 x 16", 1993)

Deas' work has been awarded seven medals from the Society of Illustrators; in 2004, his portrait of Benjamin Franklin, commissioned by Time magazine, received the Society's Hamilton King Award, conferred for best illustration of the year. Additional accolades include two gold medals for U.S. postage stamp illustrations and also work for Reader's Digest, Random House and Chiat/Day.

Deas' paintings have been exhibited at The Pierpont Morgan Library, the Smithsonian Institution, Historic Mount Vernon, the Los Angeles County Museum of Art, the Louisiana Supreme Court, the Norman Rockwell Museum, the Minneapolis Institute of Art, and the Historic New Orleans Collection.

In 2012–2013, forty of his original illustrations and personal works were the subject of a solo exhibition at the Ogden Museum of Southern Art in 2012.

Between 1985 and 1988, Deas was an instructor at the School of Visual Arts in New York City. In addition to his artwork, Deas is a noted authority on Edgar Allan Poe. His 1989 book, The Portraits & Daguerreotypes of Edgar Allan Poe, published by the University of Virginia, documents over 70 historic images of the poet and is now considered a standard reference work. In 2004, Deas was consulted by the Edgar Allan Poe Society of Baltimore and was instrumental in identifying a Poe daguerreotype, stolen from the Hampden-Booth Theatre Library, that appeared on Antiques Roadshow.

== Selected works ==
- Earthbound (cover art) by Richard Matheson
- Interview with the Vampire (cover art) by Anne Rice
- Legends of Hollywood series
- Time Magazine (cover art), Special Issue, July 7, 2003
