= Rebecca Guay =

American painter

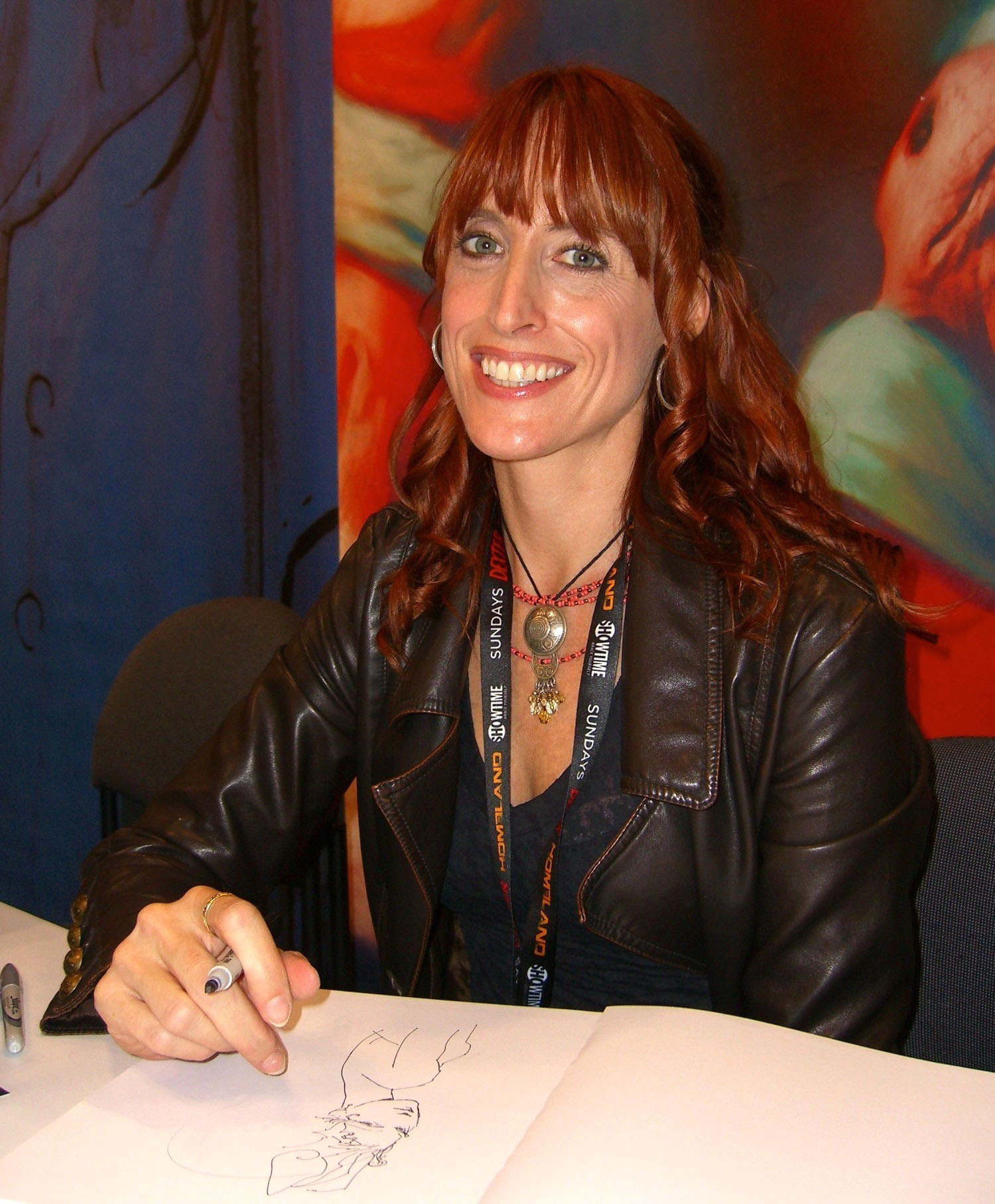
- Guay at the 2011 New York Comic Con
- Education: Pratt Institute
- Known for: Illustration, Painting
- Awards: Spectrum Gold Medal (2011), SOI West Gallery Gold Medal (2013, 2014)

Rebecca Leveille Guay is an artist known early in her career as an illustrator commissioned for work on role-playing games, collectible card games, comic books, and children's literature. She later shifted her focus toward gallery work, opening her first solo exhibition in 2013.

== Early life ==
Guay received a degree in Illustration from the Pratt Institute in New York City in 1992.

== Career ==
=== Early career ===
After graduation, Guay became an illustrator at Marvel (2099 Unlimited) and landed numerous gigs at DC Comics and its Vertigo Imprint, like becoming the full-time penciller for Black Orchid and various work with Neil Gaiman's Sandman universe.

After painting the Magic: The Gathering CCG tie-in graphic novels The Serra Angel and Magic the Homelands in 1995 for Valiant Comics, Guay worked with Wizards of the Coast/Hasbro extensively on the card game itself and was commissioned for anywhere from 3 to 12 cards per release, beginning with Alliances in 1996 through the set Eventide in 2008. Other TCG/RPG outfits she has been involved with include Dungeons & Dragons, White Wolf Publishing, Bella Sara and World of Warcraft Trading Card Game.

Her other major clients include Topps, Dark Horse Comics, MTV Animation, Lucasfilm, Simon & Schuster, Scholastic, Barefoot Books and Houghton Mifflin.

=== Collaborations ===
Guay has worked with writers such as Jane Yolen (on the children's book Ballet Stories and the graphic novel adaptation of Yolen's The Last Dragon), Holly Black, Louise Hawes, Alisa Kwitney, and Bill Willingham on A Flight of Angels.

=== Gallery work ===
After the completion of her last two painted graphic novels in 2011, she began focusing primarily on large scale gallery work done in oil. Her gallery work focuses on the figure with the goal being a strong emotional connection to the audience. She opened her first solo exhibition in September 2013 at the R. Michelson Gallery. Her pieces have since been shown and acquired by private collectors and several museums, including the Eric Carle Museum of Picture Book Art and the Museum of American Illustration at the Society of Illustrators in New York City.

In a crossover between her gallery work and her work in illustration, one of her pieces, The Visitor, was chosen as the cover of Spectrum 21.

== Fandom ==
After the release of Onslaught (2002), it was reported on Magic the Gathering news sites that Guay had been informed that the seven works she created for the set would be her last. In what the sites reported to be her own words: "the new art director, Jeremy Cranford, thinks my work is too feminine for the vision he has for the game."

Amid fan outrage, Wizards of the Coast released a statement clarifying their position — that Guay was never fired, but simply not contracted as a freelance artist for Legions (2003), and that her work would be used in future sets:

"To clear up some of the confusion, Rebecca Guay was not fired by Wizards of the Coast; she is a freelance artist who works with us from time to time. In fact, Rebecca is currently working with WotC on other projects in our Dungeons and Dragons line. In the Legions set, the creative team had to think of a way to show what happened to Otaria after Kamahl destroyed the Mirari. We decided we would show the effect of this magic by making really intense exaggerated versions of all of the creatures. We would have 'super versions' and 'hyper versions' of Soldiers, Clerics, Wizards, Zombies, Goblins, Elves, etc. Even the land would evolve over the course of Onslaught block. When selecting artists, the creative team selected artists that we felt would fit precisely within this vision of what Otaria was becoming. Even though Rebecca was not selected for work in the Legions set, Rebecca continues to be a highly valued part of our art team. Rebecca and I have discussed this and I have assured her that her art will appear in future Magic expansions." - Jeremy Cranford|Ask Wizards

Wizards of the Coast used Guay's work for at least seven Magic sets and a number of other products since then. One of the commissioned works, a tribute to the controversy, appeared in the 2004 joke set Unhinged:

"Persecute Artist" (1BB Sorcery - Choose an artist other than Rebecca Guay. Target player reveals his or her hand and discards all nonland cards by the chosen artist. The torches and pitchforks were no match for Rebecca's fans.)

A card satirizing Jeremy Cranford also appeared in Unhinged:

"Fascist Art Director" (1WW Creature — Human Horror - 2/2 WW: Fascist Art Director gains protection from the artist of your choice until end of turn. Dear Mr. and Mrs. Cranford, After careful analysis of Jeremy's vocational testing, I feel that he is best suited for a career in either torture or art direction.)

=== Evolution ===
In 2014, Guay launched a Kickstarter project collecting her artworks from 1993 to 2014, EVOLUTION. It was successfully funded by her fans in March of the same year (reaching over three times its intended goal of $36,000 at $124,057) and arrived from publication in January 2015.

== Teaching ==
Guay has been an instructor at the Pratt Institute and a guest lecturer at the Savannah College of Art and Design, University of Massachusetts, Rhode Island School of Design and the Eric Carle Museum of Picture Book Art. Guay is also the creator of two professional mentorship programs, the Illustration Master Class at Amherst College and its online sister program, the SmArt School.

== Awards and honors ==
Guay's work won as Best in Show at Gen Con in 2004, and she was elected Best Artist in 2005 by InQuest Magazine's Fan Choice Awards.

Guay's work on Sandman: The Book of Destiny was nominated for Eisner Award in 1998, and Flight of Angels for Vertigo was a 2013 YALSA pick.

Guay has received multiple awards for her gallery work and has been the recipient of several industry honors, including two gold medals from Spectrum.

== Personal life ==
Guay resides in Amherst, Massachusetts with her husband, artist Matthew Mitchell. Their child, Eliette, is also an artist.

== Works ==
- Bad Girls: Sirens, Jezebels, Murderesses, Thieves, and Other Female Villains (2013), written by Jane Yolen and Heidi E. Y. Stemple, illustrated by Rebecca Guay
