= Spectrum Award =

Artwork award established 1994

The Spectrum Award
- Awarded for: The best in contemporary fantasy, science fiction, and horror artwork.
- Presented by: Spectrum Fantastic Art
- First award: 1994
- Website: http://www.spectrumfantasticart.com

The Spectrum Awards were established in 1994 by Cathy Fenner and Arnie Fenner to recognize the best in fantasy, science fiction, and horror artwork created each year. They were presented until 2019, after which they appear to be defunct. The awards are commemorated in the periodic volumes of Spectrum: The Best In Contemporary Fantastic Art, along with award nominees, artist biographies, and a collection of their art.

== Spectrum Award categories ==
- Grand Master
- Advertising
- Book
- Comics
- Concept Art
- Dimensional
- Editorial
- Institutional
- Unpublished

== Spectrum Fantastic Art Live ==
The Spectrum Awards were presented annually during an evening event held in conjunction with Spectrum Fantastic Art Live (SFAL).

== See also ==
- Spectrum: The Best In Contemporary Fantastic Art
