= Terryl Whitlatch =

American illustrator

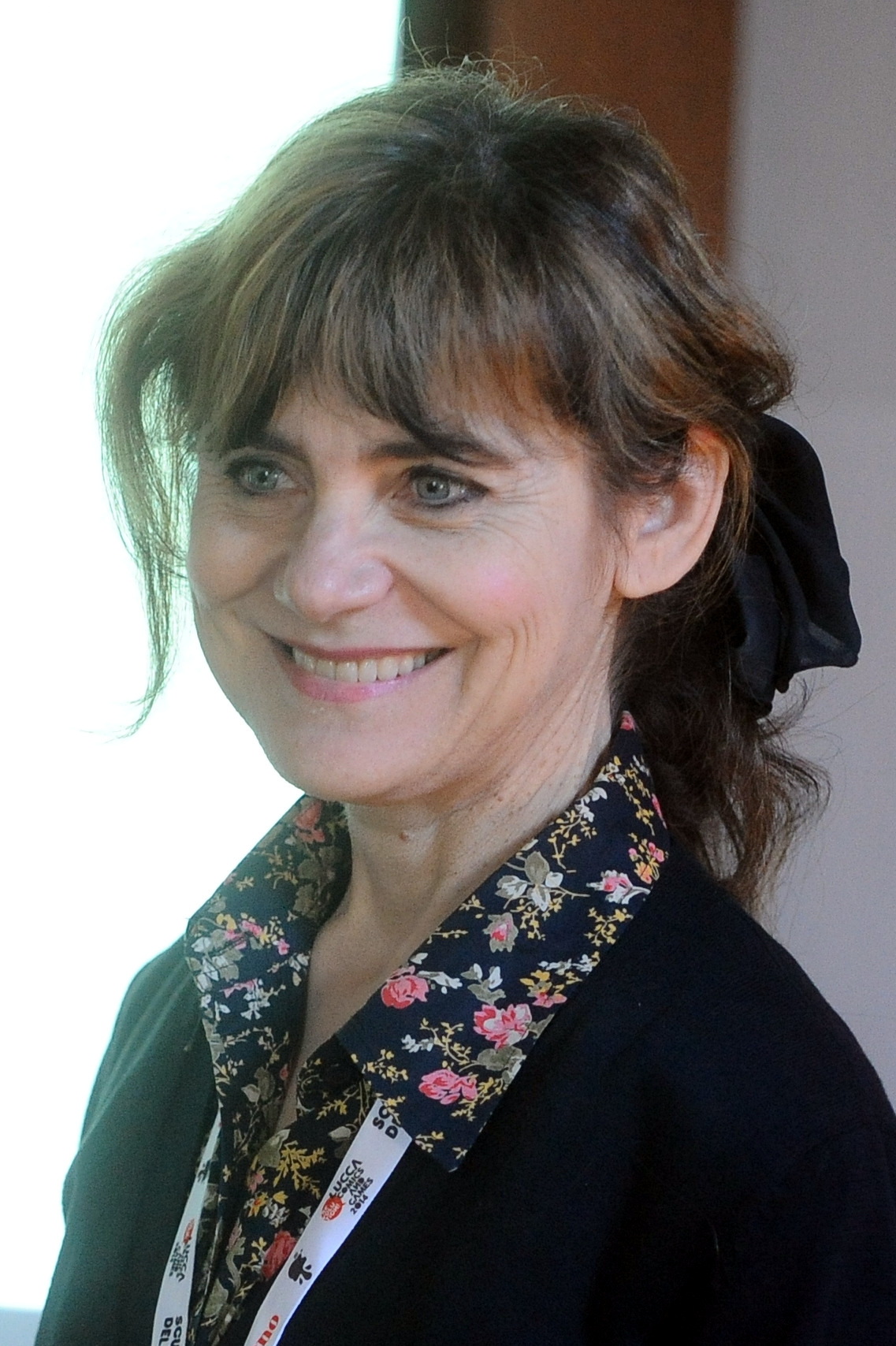
Terryl Whitlatch at Lucca Comics & Games 2014.

Terryl Anne Whitlatch (born 1960 in Oakland, California) is an American scientific and academically trained illustrator, known for her creature designs for Lucasfilm and her illustrations in the book The Katurran Odyssey among others.

Whitlatch grew up in the East Bay, in the San Francisco area. Her mother was an illustrator and her father was a biologist. She studied zoology at Sonoma State University, and later transferred to Academy of Art University in San Francisco, where she graduated.

== Films ==
Whitlatch has worked with many major studios and effects houses as a creature and concept designer. Clients include Industrial Light and Magic, Lucasfilm Ltd., Pixar, Walt Disney Feature Animation, PDI, Entertainment Arts, LucasArts, Chronicle Books, and various zoos and natural history museums.

Whitlatch was the principal creature designer for Star Wars: Episode I – The Phantom Menace. She designed most of the alien characters and creatures, from concept to fully realized anatomies and stylizations. Some of the significant characters include Jar Jar Binks, Sebulba, the pod racers, the undersea monsters of Naboo, and the Naboo Swamp creatures. She also worked closely with George Lucas in the redesign of such pre-existing characters as Jabba the Hutt and the dewbacks in the remastered versions of the original Star Wars movies.

Whitlatch designed bear, moose, and other animal characters, from highly realistic anatomical studies to fully branded characters for Disney Feature Animation's Brother Bear. Other films to which she has contributed concept work include John Carter and Pixar's Brave.

== Print media ==
Whitlatch also creates and illustrates books. Her titles include The Wildlife of Star Wars: A Field Guide, The Katurran Odyssey, Animals Real and Imagined, Science of Creature Design, and Principles of Creature Design. Her work has also appeared in ImagineFX magazine and Aeon magazine.

== Educational work ==
Terryl Whitlatch an international speaker and instructor for Schoolism, a division of Imaginism Studios in animal anatomy and creature design.

She used to teach classes at her alma mater, Academy of Art University.

Whitlatch currently works at Imagination International, Inc. as a designer and curriculum developer of Creatures of Amalthea, an online creature design course, as well as other book and world building intellectual properties.
