= Michael Whelan =

American fantasy and science fiction artist (born 1950)

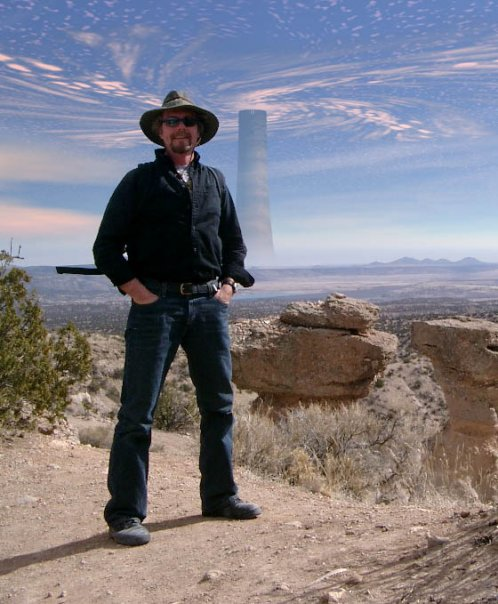
- Michael Whelan and the Dark Tower
- Born: June 29, 1950 (age 76); Culver City, California, U.S.
- Education: San Jose State University; Art Center College of Design
- Known for: Painting, drawing
- Movement: Fantasy art, surrealism
- Spouse: Audrey Price
- Children: Alexa Price-Whelan, Adrian Price-Whelan
- Website: www.michaelwhelan.com

Michael Whelan (born June 29, 1950) is an American illustrator specializing in science fiction and fantasy cover art. Since the mid-1990s, he has pursued a fine art career, selling non-commissioned paintings through galleries in the United States and through his website. The Science Fiction Hall of Fame inducted Whelan in June 2009, the first living artist so honored.

His paintings have appeared on the covers of more than 350 books and magazines, including many Stephen King novels, most of the Del Rey editions of Anne McCaffrey's Dragonriders of Pern series, Piers Anthony's Incarnations of Immortality series, the Del Rey edition of Edgar Rice Burroughs' Mars series, Melanie Rawn's Dragon Prince and Dragon Star series, the Del Rey editions of H. P. Lovecraft's short story collections, the Grand Master edition of Ray Bradbury's fix-up novel The Martian Chronicles, DAW editions of Michael Moorcock's Elric of Melniboné books, numerous DAW editions of C. J. Cherryh's work, many of Robert A. Heinlein's novels including Friday and The Cat Who Walks Through Walls, the Ace editions of H. Beam Piper's Fuzzy novels, and Tad Williams's Memory, Sorrow, and Thorn, Otherland, and Shadowmarch series and Brandon Sanderson's The Stormlight Archive. Whelan provided covers and interior illustrations for Stephen King's The Gunslinger and The Dark Tower, the first and last of his Dark Tower books.

Michael Whelan has also done cover art for many record albums. These include Demolition Hammer's Epidemic of Violence, The Jacksons' Victory; Sepultura's Beneath the Remains, Arise, Chaos A.D. and Roots; Soulfly's Dark Ages; Obituary's Cause of Death; and every album by the Elric-influenced metal band Cirith Ungol. He painted original works for the covers of Meat Loaf's Bat Out of Hell II: Back into Hell and The Very Best of Meat Loaf albums and several of his older paintings illustrate the liner notes of the former. In 2009, he painted the cover art for thrash metal band Evile's album Infected Nations.

== Biography ==
Michael Whelan was born in Culver City, California, the son of William and Nancy Whelan. As a child, he had a nomadic existence, moving nearly every other year, as the family followed his father's career in the aerospace industry. He attended eight elementary schools, three junior high schools and four high schools, and often lived during the summer in other locations. He grew up in Colorado, several cities along the California coast, and in New Mexico, near the White Sands Missile Range. Whelan credits his time near White Sands and Vandenberg Air Force Base as a lasting influence.

By the time he was a sophomore in high school, his family had moved to Denver, Colorado. There he began formal training in art, taking summer classes at the Rocky Mountain College of Art and Design when he was 15.

Whelan continued school as a pre-medical biology major at San José State University, initially. There he worked in the Anatomy and Physiology Department, gaining a first-hand knowledge of human anatomy. He says that his job "involved all sorts of tasks related to the anatomy department, such as preparing cadavers for the classes, stringing bones together to make complete skeletons, making models of body parts, some medical illustration, etc."

After graduating from San José State University in 1973 with a BA in Painting (as a "President's Scholar"), Whelan studied at the Art Center College of Design in Pasadena, California for nine months from 1973 to 1974. In 1974, Whelan exhibited his work at the World Science Fiction Convention in Washington, D.C., where it was seen by Thomas Schlück, who first discovered his work and contracted to use it in European publications shortly afterwards. Donald A. Wollheim of DAW Books gave him his first American professional assignment, the cover painting and frontispiece drawing for Lin Carter's fantasy novel, The Enchantress of World's End (May 1975).

Shortly after arriving on the East Coast he exhibited some of his student work in the Lunacon convention art show in New York, where it was seen by Harlan Ellison. Ellison obtained the first magazine assignment for him, illustrating Ellison's story "Croatoan" which appeared in Gallery magazine in June 1975. At Lunacon Michael also met Rick Bryant, who subsequently introduced him to Neal Adams. Adams called the art director of Ace Books and paved the way for his first assignment at Ace. In 1975, Whelan painted the cover illustrations for ten books, eight from DAW and two Ace reprints of early Darkover novels by Marion Zimmer Bradley.

Whelan soon gained a reputation as a cover artist, working for science fiction and fantasy publishers such as DAW, Del Rey, and Ace. He credits the 1978 publication of Anne McCaffrey's best-selling The White Dragon featuring his cover art as a turning point in his career.

Whelan won his first Hugo Award for Best Professional Artist in 1980 at the World Science Fiction Convention in Boston. He went on to win the next Hugos, and at the 50th Worldcon in 1992 was voted the best professional artist of the last 50 years. As of 2010, he has won fifteen Hugo Awards.

When commissioned, Whelan made a practice of reading the entire book that he sought to illustrate, usually twice. "I try to let the book I'm illustrating determine the approach and subject matter," he stated.

Whelan illustrated the cover for Meat Loaf's 1993 album Bat Out of Hell II: Back into Hell. He also provided several illustrations for the insert booklet, which were also used for the single releases such as "I'd Do Anything for Love (But I Won't Do That)". Larger versions of his artwork were featured in the album's 2002 special edition release. He has since gone on to paint album cover artwork for many other recording artists, including Michael Jackson, Sepultura, and Jonn Serrie.

In the early 1990s, Whelan devoted his time to personal visions and gallery works. In 1997, he held his first solo art show at Tree's Place in Orleans, Massachusetts. Its success led to another in 1999 and his eventual semi-retirement from illustration. Over the past two decades, many of Whelan's gallery pieces were featured in published projects, including the SPECTRUM art annuals.

Whelan has returned to illustrate several major book covers during his semi-retirement, including the last book of Stephen King's Dark Tower series, the final volume of Robert Jordan's The Wheel of Time, covers for The Last King of Osten Ard series by Tad Williams, and the first arc of The Stormlight Archive by Brandon Sanderson. In 2015, The Stephen King Companion: Four Decades of Fear from the Master of Horror, which feature Whelan's illustrations, was published by St. Martin's Press.

In 2024, Whelan announced in an interview that the cover for Wind and Truth would be the last assignment of his illustration career.

Whelan has two children, including Adrian Price-Whelan.

== Honors ==
Michael Whelan commemorative block in the Science Fiction Hall of Fame

Whelan's honors and awards include:

- Fifteen Hugo Awards, including:
  - Thirteen for Best Professional Artist (1980–1986, 1988–1989, 1991–1992, 2000, and 2002)
  - Best Original Artwork for The Summer Queen (1992)
  - Best Nonfiction Book (Michael Whelan's Works of Wonder)
- Three World Fantasy Awards for Best Artist (1981, 1982, & 1983)
- World Fantasy Award—Life Achievement for outstanding service to the fantasy field presented at World Fantasy Convention in 2025
- The readers of Locus magazine, the #1 professional and fan resource publication for the fantasy and science fiction genre, have awarded Whelan "Best Professional Artist" 31 times in their annual poll.
- Twelve Chesley Awards from the Association of Science Fiction & Fantasy Artists (ASFA)
- Inducted by the Science Fiction Hall of Fame, June 2009—the first living artist to have been inducted
- The Science Fiction and Fantasy Writers of America Solstice Award in 2011 for "his significant impact on the science fiction and fantasy landscape"

== Published art collections ==
- Beyond Science Fiction: The Alternative Realism of Michael Whelan, (2018) Baby Tattoo Books, ISBN 978-1-61404-018-7
- Something in My Eye, (1997) Mark V. Ziesing (poster book), ISBN 0-929480-82-1
- The Art of Michael Whelan: Scenes/Visions, (1993) Bantam Books, ISBN 0-553-07447-4
- Michael Whelan's Works of Wonder, (1988) Del Rey Books, ISBN 0-345-32679-2
- Wonderworks: Science Fiction and Fantasy Art, (1979) Donning/Starblaze, ISBN 0-915442-74-4
- Infinite Worlds: The Fantastic Visions of Science Fiction Art (1997) Penguin Group, Vincent Di Fate (author), ISBN 978-0-670-87252-7
- The Biographical Dictionary of SF & Fantasy Artists, Robt. Weinberg, ed., 1988
- Sorcerers – A Collection of Fantasy Art (1978), Bruce Jones and Armand Eisen editors, Bibliographic record for Title at the Library of Congress, ISBN 978-0-345-27626-1
- Tomorrow And Beyond – Masterpieces of Science Fiction Art (1978), edited by Ian Summers ISBN 0-89480-055-8
- SPECTRUM – The Best in Contemporary Fantastic Art (1994) Underwood Books, edited by Cathy and Arnie Fenner, ISBN 0-88733-188-2
- The Chesley Awards – A Retrospective (2003), by John Grant and Elizabeth Humphrey, with Pamela D. Scoville ISBN 1-904332-10-2
- The Frank Collection (1999), Edited by Jane and Howard Frank, ISBN 1-85585-732-4
- SPECTRUM 15 – The Best in Contemporary Fantastic Art (2008) Underwood Books, edited by Cathy and Arnie Fenner, ISBN 1-59929-027-8

== Sources ==
- The Demon of Scattery (1979), by Poul Anderson, and Mildred Downey Broxon, illustrated by Alicia Austin
- Locus, "Michael Whelan: Breathing Space", January 1993.
- Infinite Worlds: The Fantastic Visions of Science Fiction Art, Vincent Di Fate (author), ISBN 978-0-670-87252-7
- The Biographical Dictionary of SF & Fantasy Artists, Robt. Weinberg, ed., 1988
- "Michael Whelan: Leap of Faith", by Karen Haber, Realms of Fantasy magazine, October 2001
- The Christian Science Monitor, February 15, 1990
- ARTFORUM International Magazine, September 1998 article, "Wonder Bred", by Bruce Wagner
- Starlog, November 1985, "The 100 Most Important People in Science Fiction"
- Infinite Worlds: The Fantastic Visions of Science Fiction Art, Vincent Di Fate (author), ISBN 978-0-670-87252-7
- Chicago Sun-Times, October 1993
- The Mammoth Encyclopedia of Science Fiction, edited by George Mann, ISBN 0-7867-0887-5
- The Encyclopedia of Science Fiction, 1978, consultant editor: Robert Holdstock
- The New Encyclopedia of Science Fiction (1988), edited by James Gunn, ISBN 0-670-81041-X
- The Frank Collection (1999), edited by Jane and Howard Frank, ISBN 1-85585-732-4
- The Chesley Awards: A Retrospective (2003), by John Grant and Elizabeth Humphrey, with Pamela D. Scoville ISBN 1-904332-10-2
