= Claire Wendling =

French comics author (born 1967)

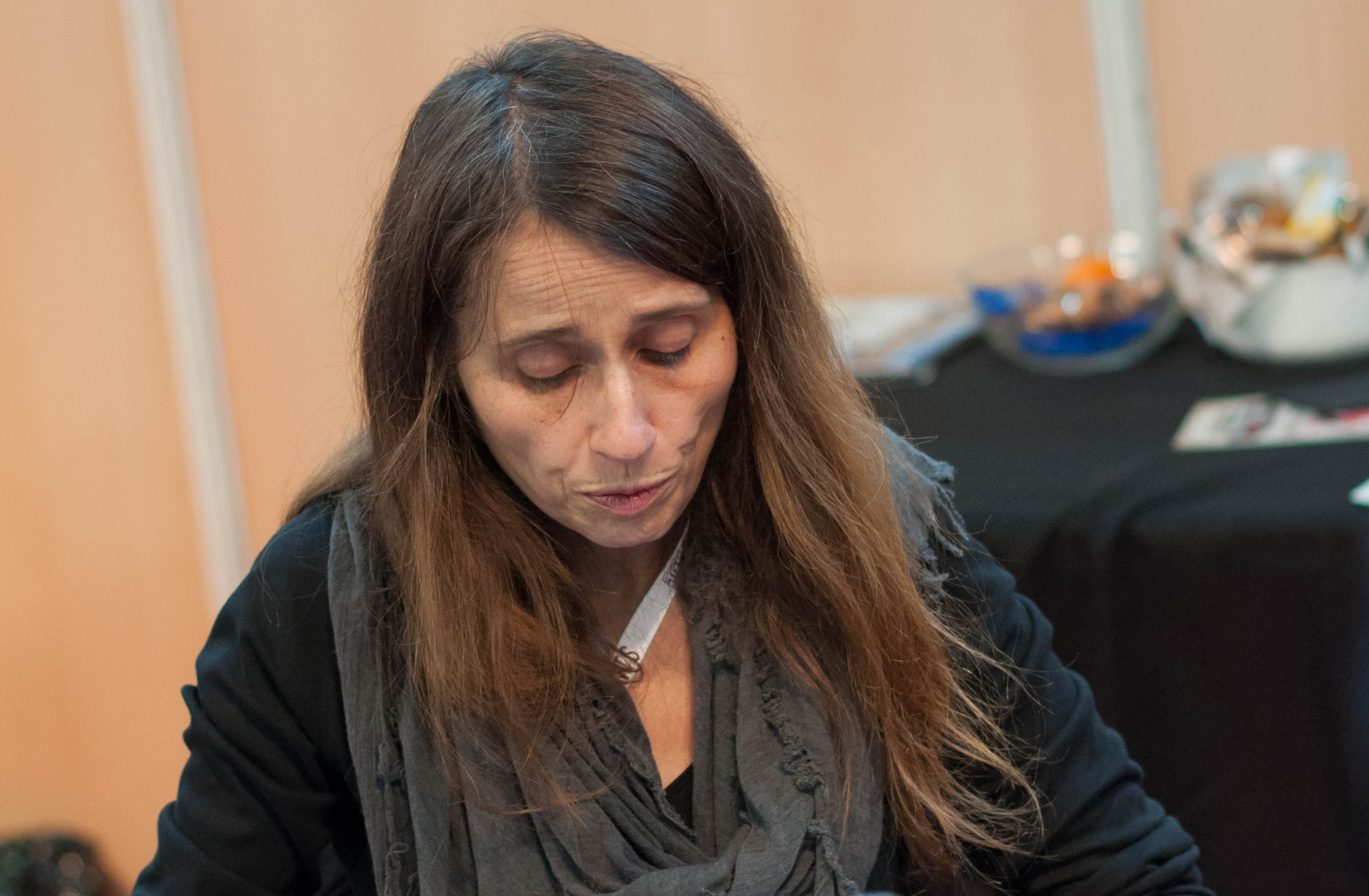
- Born: December 6, 1967 (age 58) Montpellier, France
- Areas: Penciller, Artist, Inker, Publisher
- Notable works: Forget-Me-Not; Daisies; Iguana Bay

Claire Wendling (born 1967) is a French comics author.

== Biography ==
In 1989, while still in the School of Fine Arts of Angoulême, she won the "Artist of the Future" prize at the Angoulême International Comics Festival and participated in two anthologies published by Delcourt, The Children of the Nile and Entrechats. In 1990 began her one and only series Les Lumières de l'Amalou (The lights of Amalou), written by Christophe Gibelin, which won the Press award at Angoulême.

In 1997, she was hired by Warners studio and moved to Los Angeles to participate in various projects including The Quest for Camelot. Failing to acclimatize, she returned to France eight months later and published Desk, a book of sketches made in Los Angeles. In 2000, she did graphic design work for the video game Alone in the Dark IV.

Wendling is an infrequent author: some short stories, a series of sketch books and illustrative works, her complete works are held in a single volume. She has been compared to Régis Loisel, but Wendling is perhaps closer to English-speaking cartoonists such as Jeffrey Catherine Jones or Mike Mignola.

In 2016 she was one of three shortlisted candidates for the Grand Prix de la ville d'Angoulême, one of the world's most prestigious comics awards, along with Alan Moore and eventual winner Hermann Huppen.

In 2017, she was to be guest of honor at the 75th Worldcon (World Science Fiction Convention), but cancelled due to illness.

== Publications ==
=== Les Lumières de l'Amalou ===
written by Christophe Gibelin, Delcourt

1. Théo (1990)
2. Le Pantin (1991)
3. Le Village tordu (1992)
4. Gouals (1994)
5. Cendres (1996)

=== Collective ===
- Les enfants du Nil, Carmina & Vittorio (screenplay Christophe Gibelin). 1989, Delcourt.
- Entrechats. 1989, Delcourt
- La fabrique Delcourt a dix ans.1996, Delcourt
- Sales petits contes (written by Yann le Pennetier). 1997, Dupuis
- Vampires T.1 (2001), Carabas
- Vampires T.2 (couverture) (2002), Carabas

=== Illustrations ===
- Gatonomor (1994)
- Planches & Dessins (1995)
- Iguana Bay (1996)
- Wendling Portfolio (1997)
- Desk (1999)
- Aphrodite vol. 3 (textes de Pierre Louÿs) (2000)
- Drawers (2001)
- Daisies (2009)
- Daisies - Affogato all'Amarena (2010)
- Forget-Me-Not (2016)
- Rainbook (2018)

=== Comic book covers ===
- X-Men Fairy Tales #4 (2006)
- Avengers Fairy Tales #1 (2008)
- Avengers Fairy Tales #2 (2008)
- Avengers Fairy Tales #3 (2008)
- Avengers Fairy Tales #4 (2008)
- Sky Doll: Doll Factory V1 Variant Cover (2009)
- Wonder Woman V4 #45 Variant Cover (2011)
- Convergence Catwoman #1 (2015)
- Convergence Catwoman #2 (2015)
- Le Luci Dell' Amalou 1: Théo (2014)
- Le Luci Dell' Amalou 2: Il Fantoccio (2014)
- Le Luci Dell' Amalou 3: Nel Paese Della Leggenda (2014)
- Le Luci Dell' Amalou 4: Gouals (2015)
- Le Luci Dell' Amalou 5: Cenere (2015)
