= Scott Gustafson =

American illustrator

- Born: December 7, 1956 (age 69); Marengo, Illinois
- Education: Chicago Academy of Fine Arts; Columbia College Chicago
- Known for: Illustrator; Painting
- Style: Golden Age of American Illustration; Classic Animation

Scott Gustafson (December 7, 1956) is an American illustrator based in Chicago, Illinois, United States. His career has spanned over twenty-five years, and during it, he has worked as a freelance cartoonist and contributed illustrations to various magazines and children's books. During the later years of his career, he wanted to write a story lengthier than a thirty-two page children's book. In August 2011, his only novel Eddie: The Lost Youth of Edgar Allan Poe was published.

His art style is inspired by the Golden Age of American Illustration. Due to this, his work has a fairytale-like appearance and many of his illustrations feature fantastical and Biblical characters and settings.

== Personal life ==
Gustafson was born and raised in Marengo, Illinois. He enjoyed drawing as a child and his dream was to become an artist. By the eighth grade, he knew he wanted to be an animator, and recalls in an interview with Step-By-Step Graphics, that "it was a scene from Pinocchio that helped him make up his mind". He says it was the scene where "Honest John convinces Pinocchio to run away and join the acting company", and sings the song, it's an actor's life for me. He says he sat through the film twice, thinking "I want to do animation like that". It was also during this period, he acquired two books on Norman Rockwell, which further piqued his interest in illustration. During high school, he would read articles about N. C. Wyeth and Maxfield Parrish in American Heritage magazine, and he remarks that "these articles were an introduction to a whole new world for me, and I'd create pictures trying to copy their styles". He was also inspired by the works of Walt Disney and Warner Brothers, which led him to pursue a career in animation.

He attended college at the Chicago Academy of Fine Arts. While he was there, he focused on animation classes and only took one illustration class. The school experienced internal troubles and had to close down. This caused Gustafson to transfer to Columbia College Chicago. He continued his pursuit of animation but started to consider a career in children's books when he took a children's book illustration class.

In an interview with “Insights from Illinois Authors,” Gustafson stated that he started out using gouache, acrylics, and watercolor for his works. He mainly relied on acrylics, however, because they dried quickly, enabling him to meet deadlines. When he began work on his first trade book, The Night Before Christmas by Clement Clarke Moore, he started to use oils due to having a more relaxed deadline. Once he learned how to use oils more effectively and mix Liquin with them, they became his preferred medium to work in.

== Career ==
Gustafson graduated from college with a degree in animation. Despite this, Gustafson worked as a freelance artist after college instead because he learned that working in the field of animation was more restrictive than working in the field of illustration. When asked about this career choice, Gustafson has stated, “The opportunities of animation, in terms of subject matter and creative control, weren’t nearly as interesting or rewarding as those of illustration. As an animator, your contribution to a given film is, by necessity, limited to whatever character you’ve been assigned. But as an illustrator, you’re responsible for locations, sets, costumes, props, lighting, and character designs, not mention the overall mood and emotion of a given painting. It’s about the best job there is."

During his early years, he illustrated for small presses in the Chicago area and magazines. Some time later, he received a call from New York and worked on a storybook version of Clement Clarke Moore's The Night Before Christmas a few months later.

In 1997, The Greenwich Workshop Collection released “treasures for the child in each of us.” It is a collection of three-dimensional art created by Gustafson.

Gustafson has been commissioned by various publishers and companies such as Celestial Seasonings, Playboy magazine, Saturday Evening Post, The Bradford Exchange, and DreamWorks.

== Books ==
Gustafson has stated that he has planned out stories on the side while he has worked on children's books, but those ideas never got approval from his editors. He then realized that the stories he wanted to tell would not work as a short picture book. He then got the idea for Eddie: The Lost Youth of Edgar Allan Poe and decided to attempt to write a longer story. The idea was approved, and in 2011, the book was released.

Gustafson stated that his goal when writing Animal Orchestra was not for it to just be entertaining for children but also educational. His goal with Eddie: The Lost Youth of Edgar Allan Poe was to introduce young readers to the work of Edgar Allan Poe in hopes they would explore his writings.

Books by other authors that feature his work include: The Night Before Christmas by Clement Clarke Moore, Peter Pan by J.M. Barrie, and The Nutcracker.

His own works are: Alphabet Soup, Animal Orchestra, Classic Fairy Tales, Favorite Nursery Rhymes from Mother Goose, and Eddie: The Lost Youth of Edgar Allan Poe.

== Awards ==
Gustafson has won multiple awards over his career. He has been awarded a Chelsea Award by the Association of Science Fiction and Fantasy Artists and an Independent Publisher Book Award for Best Children's Picture Book. He has also received a Chesly Award (2005) for Best Interior Artwork and a CA Illustration Award.

== Personal life ==
Gustafson is married and has a son. He works at home with his wife, Patty. She handles the computer and digital aspects of their business, while he works in his studio. Due to this, he has stated that he is computer illiterate.
