= James Gurney =

American illustrator and novelist

- Born: June 14, 1958 (age 68)
- Education: Art Center College of Design
- Known for: Illustration, paleoart
- Website: jamesgurney.com

James Gurney (born June 14, 1958) is an American artist and author known for his illustrated book series Dinotopia, which is presented in the form of a 19th-century explorer's journal from an island utopia cohabited by humans and dinosaurs.

Gurney is also a paleoartist who depicts and restores in his paintings extinct fauna such as both avian and non-avian dinosaurs.

== Life and education ==
James Gurney was born on June 14, 1958, in Glendale, California. He grew up in Palo Alto, California, the youngest of five children of Joanna and Robert Gurney, a mechanical engineer. Growing up, he showed great interest in dinosaurs but found few books on the subject in his local library or school. The first dinosaur fossil he saw was that of an Allosaurus at a museum. His fascination with dinosaurs led to an interest in archaeology. As a youth, he dug up his home's back yard looking for arrowheads or lost temples.

He studied anthropology at the University of California, Berkeley, receiving a Bachelor of Arts degree with Phi Beta Kappa honors in 1979. He then studied illustration at the Art Center College of Design in Pasadena, California, for a couple of semesters.

Gurney met his wife, fellow artist Jeanette, as a sketching partner in Art Center College of Design, Pasadena, California. Together they moved to the Hudson Valley of New York, where they raised their two sons. Gurney welcomed his family around when painting, setting up a play space in the studio near his painting table. The couple are still avid outdoor painters, living in a small town in the Hudson Valley.

== Career ==
Prompted by a cross-country adventure on freight trains, Gurney and Thomas Kinkade coauthored The Artist's Guide to Sketching in 1982. They also worked together as painters of background scenes for the animated film Fire and Ice (1983), co-produced by Ralph Bakshi and Frank Frazetta.

Gurney's freelance illustration career began in the 1980s, during which time he developed his characteristic realistic renderings of fantastic scenes, painted in oil using methods similar to the academic realists and Golden Age illustrators. He painted more than 70 covers for science fiction and fantasy paperback novels. He created several stamp designs for the U.S. Postal Service, most notably The World of Dinosaurs in 1996.

Starting in 1983, he began work on over a dozen assignments for National Geographic magazine, including reconstructions of the ancient Moche, Kushite, and Etruscan civilizations, and the Jason and Ulysses voyages for Tim Severin. The inspiration that came from researching these archaeological reconstructions led to a series of lost-world panoramas, including Waterfall City (1988) and Dinosaur Parade (1989).

With the encouragement of retired publishers Ian and Betty Ballantine, he discontinued his freelance work and committed two years' time to writing and illustrating Dinotopia: A Land Apart from Time, published in 1992. The book made The New York Times Bestseller List, and won Hugo, World Fantasy, Chesley, Spectrum, and Colorado Children's Book awards. It sold over a million copies and was translated into 18 languages.

Sequels of Dinotopia that are both written and illustrated by Gurney include Dinotopia: The World Beneath (1995), Dinotopia: First Flight (1999), and Dinotopia: Journey to Chandara (2007).

Original artwork by Gurney from the Dinotopia books has been exhibited at the National Museum of Natural History of the Smithsonian Institution, the Norman Rockwell Museum, the Royal Tyrrell Museum and is currently on tour to museums throughout the United States and Europe.

Most recently, he has written two art-instruction books: Imaginative Realism: How to Paint What Doesn't Exist (2009), a book about drawing and painting things that do not exist; and Color and Light: A Guide for the Realist Painter (2010). These books are based upon Gurney's blog posts, in which he gives practical advice to realist and fantasy artists.

On February 21, 2012, Gurney was inducted as a Living Master by the Art Renewal Center.

The dinosaur Torvosaurus gurneyi was named in honor of Gurney in 2014.

== Bibliography ==
- The Artist’s Guide to Sketching (coauthored with Thomas Kinkade) (1982)
- Dinotopia: A Land Apart from Time (1992)
- Dinotopia: The World Beneath (1995)
- Dinotopia: First Flight (1999)
- Dinotopia: Journey to Chandara (2007)
- Imaginative Realism: How to Paint What Doesn’t Exist (2009)
- Color and Light: A Guide for the Realist Painter (2010)
