= List of science fiction and fantasy artists =

This is a list of science fiction and fantasy artists, notable and well-known 20th- and 21st-century artists who have created book covers or interior illustrations for books, or who have had their own books or comic books of fantastic art with science fiction or fantasy themes published. Artists known exclusively for their work in comic books are not included. Many of the artists are known for their work in both the fantasy and sf fields. Artists who have won the Hugo Award, the World Fantasy Award, or the Chesley Award are noted, as are inductees into the Science Fiction Hall of Fame.

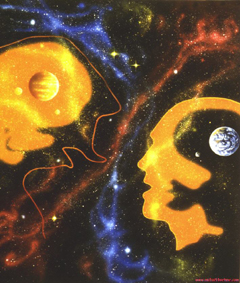
"The Meeting" by Michael Böhme, 2010

== A ==
- Chris Achilleos (1947–2021, Cyprus)
- Charles Samuel Addams (1912–1988, US)
- Dan Adkins (1937–2013, US)
- Paul Alexander (1937–2021, US)
- Chris Van Allsburg (born 1949, US)
- Horacio Altuna (born 1941, Argentina)
- Yoshitaka Amano (born 1952, Japan)
- Murphy Anderson (1926–2015, US)
- Marshall Arisman (born 1937, US)
- Boris Artzybasheff (1899–1965, Russia)
- Alicia Austin (born 1942, US) (Hugo, World Fantasy)
- John Avon (born 1961, UK)

== B ==
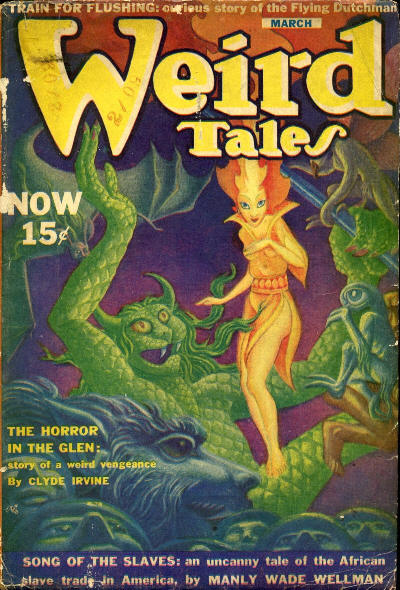
Cover art by Hannes Bok for Weird Tales March 1940

- Wayne Barlowe (born 1958, US)
- George Barr (1937-2025, US) (Hugo)
- Richard Bassford (born 1936, US)
- John Bauer (1882-1918, Sweeden)
- Jill Bauman (born US)
- Pauline Baynes (1922–2008, UK)
- Den Beauvais (born 1962, Canada) (Eagle)
- Zdzisław Beksiński (1929–2005, Polish)
- Rudolph Belarski (1900–1983, US)
- Julie Bell (born 1958, US)
- Earle K. Bergey (1901–1952, US)
- John Berkey (1932–2008, US)
- Charles Binger (1907–1974, UK)
- Simon Bisley (born 1962, UK)
- Vaughn Bodē (1941–1975, US) (Hugo)
- Michael Böhme (in German) (born 1943, Germany)
- Hannes Bok (1914–1964, US) (Hugo)
- Chesley Bonestell (1888–1986, US), namesake of the Chesley Award (Hall of Fame)
- Paul Bonner
- Franklin Booth (1874–1948, US)
- Johfra Bosschart (1919-1998, Netherlands)
- Stephen Bradbury (born 1954, UK)
- Greg Broadmore (born 1972, New Zealand)
- Gerald Brom (born 1965, US)
- Johnny Bruck (in German) (1921–1995, Germany)
- Margaret Brundage (1900–1978, US)
- Frank Brunner (born 1949, US)
- Jim Burns (born 1948, UK) (Hugo)

== C ==
- Ciruelo Cabral (born 1963, Argentina)
- Clyde Caldwell (born 1948, US)
- Thomas Canty (born 1952, US) (World Fantasy)
- Edd Cartier (1914–2008, US)
- Renato Casaro (1935-2025, Italy)
- Glenn Chadbourne (born 1959, US)
- Gary Chalk (born 1952, UK)
- Sid Check (1930–2002, US)
- David A. Cherry (born 1949, US)
- James C. Christensen (1942–2017, US)
- Alan M. Clark (born 1957, US) (World Fantasy)
- Richard Corben (1940–2020, US)
- Lee Brown Coye (1907–1981, US) (World Fantasy)
- Kinuko Y. Craft (born 1940, Japan) (World Fantasy)
- Doug Chiang (born 1962, US), Star Wars prequels

== D ==
- Salvador Dalí (1904-1989, Spain)
- Liz Danforth (born 1953, US) (Hall of Fame)
- Don Davis (born 1952, US)
- Roger Dean (born 1944, UK) (World Fantasy)
- Jean Delville (1867-1953, Belgium)
- Vincent DiFate (born 1945, US) (Hugo, Hall of Fame)
- Tony DiTerlizzi (born 1969, US)
- Leo and Diane Dillon (1933-2012/living, US) (Hugo)
- Don Dixon (born 1951, US)
- Philippe Druillet (born 1944, France)
- Edmund Dulac (1882–1953, France)
- Brian Lee Durfee (born US)

== E ==
- Jeff Easley (born 1954, US)
- Les Edwards (born 1949, UK) (World Fantasy)
- Bob Eggleton (born 1960, US) (Hugo)
- Larry Elmore (born 1948, US)
- Peter Elson (1947–1998, UK)
- Ed Emshwiller (Ed Emsh, Emsler) (1925–1990, US) (Hugo, Hall of Fame)
- M. C. Escher (1898–1972, Dutch)

== F ==
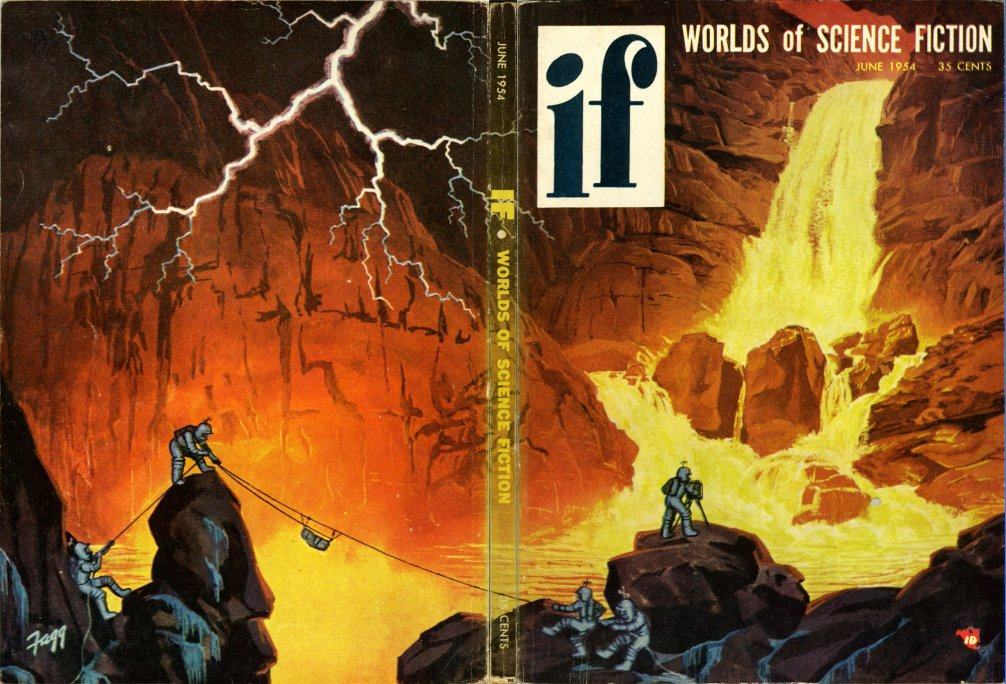
If magazine June 1954, cover art by Ken Fagg: "Lava Falls on Mercury"

- Stephen Fabian (1930–2025, US)
- Hugh Ferriss (1889–1962, US)
- Fred Fields (born US)
- Virgil Finlay (1914–1971, US) (Hall of Fame)
- Steve Fiorilla (1961–2009, US)
- Tom Fleming (artist) (born 1966, US)
- Danny Flynn (born UK)
- Phil Foglio (born 1956, US) (Hugo)
- Henry Justice Ford (1860 – 1941, UK)
- Chris Foss (born 1946, UK)
- Brad W. Foster (born 1955, US) (Hugo)
- Matt Fox (1906–1988, US)
- Dick Francis
- Frank Frazetta (1928–2010, US) (Hugo, World Fantasy)
- Frank Kelly Freas (1922–2005, US) (Hugo, Hall of Fame)
- Brian Froud (born 1947, UK) (Hugo)
- Wendy Froud (born 1954, US)

== G ==
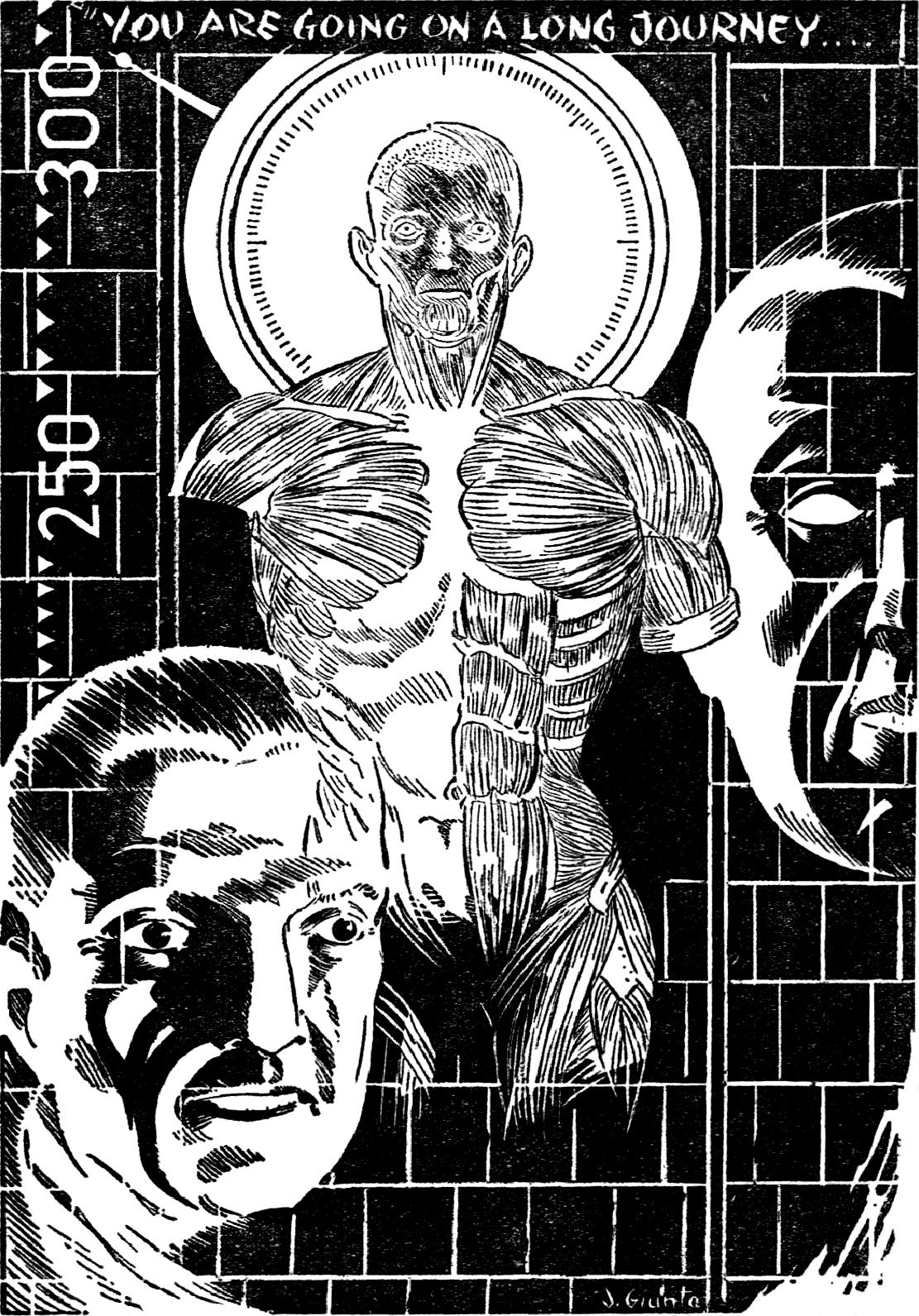
John Giunta illustration, Weird Tales May 1950

- Hector Garrido (1928–2020, Argentina)
- Jack Gaughan (1930–1985, US) (Hugo)
- Neil Gaiman (born 1960, UK)
- Donato Giancola (born 1967, US) (Chesley, Hugo, World Fantasy)
- H. R. Giger (1940–2014, Switzerland) (Hall of Fame)
- Alexis A. Gilliland (born 1931, US) (Hugo)
- Juan Giménez (1943-2020, Argentina)
- Jean Giraud (Moebius) (1938–2012, France) (World Fantasy, Hall of Fame)
- John Giunta (1920–1970, US)
- Warwick Goble (1862-1943, UK)
- Rob Gonsalves (1959–2017, Canada)
- Edward Gorey (1925–2000, US) (World Fantasy)
- Michel Granger (born 1946, France)
- Melvyn Grant (born 1944, UK)
- Vernon Grant (1935–2006, US)
- James Gurney (born 1958, US) (World Fantasy)
- Alan Gutierrez (born 1958, US)

== H ==
- Michael Hague (born 1948, US)
- Frank Hampson (1918–1985, UK)
- Joan Hanke-Woods (1945–2013, US) (Hugo)
- David A. Hardy (born 1936, UK)
- John Harris (born 1948, UK)
- Teddy Harvia (born David Thayer, US) (Hugo)
- Stephen Hickman (1949–2021, US)
- Mike Hinge (1931-2003, US)
- Hidetaka Tenjin (born 1973, Japan)
- Brothers Hildebrandt (1939-2006/2024, US) (World Fantasy)
- Jim Holloway (-2020, US)
- John Howe (born 1957, Canada)
- Debbie Hughes (born 1958, US) (Chesley)
- Judson Huss (1942–2008, US)

== I ==
- Graham Ingels (1915–1991, US)
- Naohisa Inoue (born 1948, Japan)
- Ionicus (1913–1998, UK)
- Vsevolod Ivanov (born 1950, URSS)
- Ian Miller (born 1946, UK)

== J ==
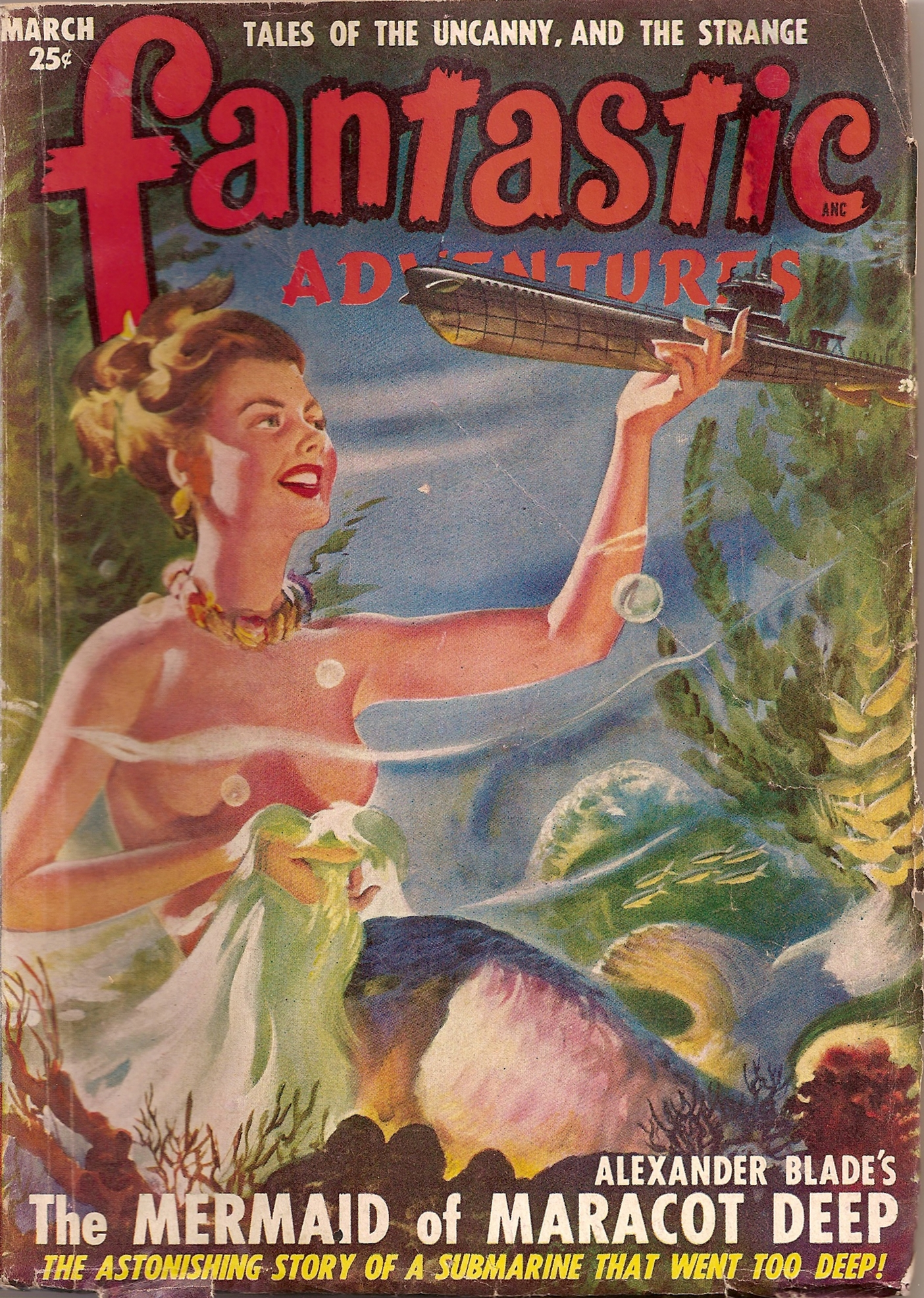
Fantastic Adventures March 1949, cover by Alexander Kohn

- Tim Jacobus (born 1959, US)
- Jael (1937–2020, US)
- Zoran Janjetov (born 1961, Yugoslavia)
- James Jean (born 1979, Taiwan) (World Fantasy)
- Matt Jefferies (1921–2003, US)
- Howard David Johnson (born 1954, US)
- Eddie Jones (1935–1999, UK)
- Patrick J. Jones (born Northern Ireland)
- Peter Andrew Jones (born 1951, UK)
- Jeffrey Catherine Jones (1944–2011, US) (World Fantasy)
- Tom Jung (born 1942, US)
- Joe Jusko (born 1959, US)

== K ==
- Michael Kaluta (born 1947, US)
- Ken Kelly (1946-2022, US)
- Thomas Kidd (born 1955, US) (World Fantasy)
- Josh Kirby (1928–2001, UK)
- Tim Kirk (born 1947, US) (Hugo)
- C. M. Kosemen (born 1984, Turkey)
- Roy Krenkel (1918–1983, US) (Hugo)
- Bernard Krigstein (1919–1990, US)
- Alfred Kubin (1877-1959, Austria)

== L ==
- Alan Lee (born 1947, UK) (World Fantasy)
- Alexander Leydenfrost (1888–1961, Hungary)
- Peter Lloyd (1944–2009, UK)
- Todd Lockwood (born 1957, US) (Chesley)

== M ==
- Don Maitz (born 1953, US) (Hugo, World Fantasy)
- René Magritte (1898–1967, Belgium)
- Stephan Martinière (born 1962, France) (Chesley, Hugo)
- Rodney Matthews (born 1945, UK)
- David Mattingly (born 1956, US)
- Robert McCall (1919–2010, US)
- Iain McCaig (born 1957, US)
- Harold McCauley (1913-1977, US)
- Winsor McCay (1871–1934, US)
- Jim McDermott (born 1960, US)
- Dave McKean (born 1963, US) (World Fantasy)
- Angus McKie (born 1951, UK)
- Shawn McManus (born 1958, US)
- Ralph McQuarrie (1929–2012, US)
- Ian Mcque (date unknown, UK)
- Syd Mead (1933–2019, US)
- Ilene Meyer (1939–2009, US)
- Ian Miller (born 1946, UK)
- Ron Miller (born 1947, US)
- Jeff Miracola (born 1971, US)
- Jean-Baptiste Monge (born 1971, Canada)
- Chris Moore (1947–2025, UK)
- Rowena Morrill (born 1944, US)
- Gray Morrow (1934–2001, US)
- Lee Moyer (born US)

== N ==
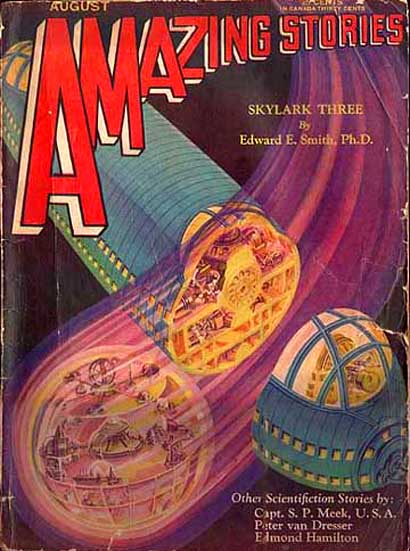
Amazing Stories cover by Frank Paul, 1930

- Ted Nasmith (born 1956, Canada)
- Russ Nicholson (-2023, UK)
- Naoyuki Kato (born 1952, Japan)
- Earl Norem (1923–2015, US)

== O ==
- Noriyoshi Ohrai (1935–2015, Japan)
- Glen Orbik (1963–2015, US)
- Erol Otus (born US)

== P ==
- John Jude Palencar (born 1957, UK)
- Keith Parkinson (1958–2005, US)
- Maxfield Parrish (1870-1966, US)
- Frank R. Paul (1884–1963, Austria-Hungary) (Hall of Fame)
- Bruce Pennington (born 1944, UK)
- John Picacio (born 1969, US) (World Fantasy)
- Mike Ploog (born 1940 OR 1942, US)
- Richard M. Powers (1921–1996, US) (Hall of Fame)
- Victoria Poyser (born 1949, US)

== R ==
- Arthur Rackham (1867–1939, UK)
- Hugh Doak Rankin (1878–1956, US)
- Odilon Redon (1840–1916, France)
- Wayne Reynolds (born UK)
- Derek Riggs (born 1958, UK)
- Nicholas Roerich (1874-1947, Russia)
- William Rotsler (1926–1997, US) (Hugo)
- Luis Royo (born 1954, Spain)

== S ==
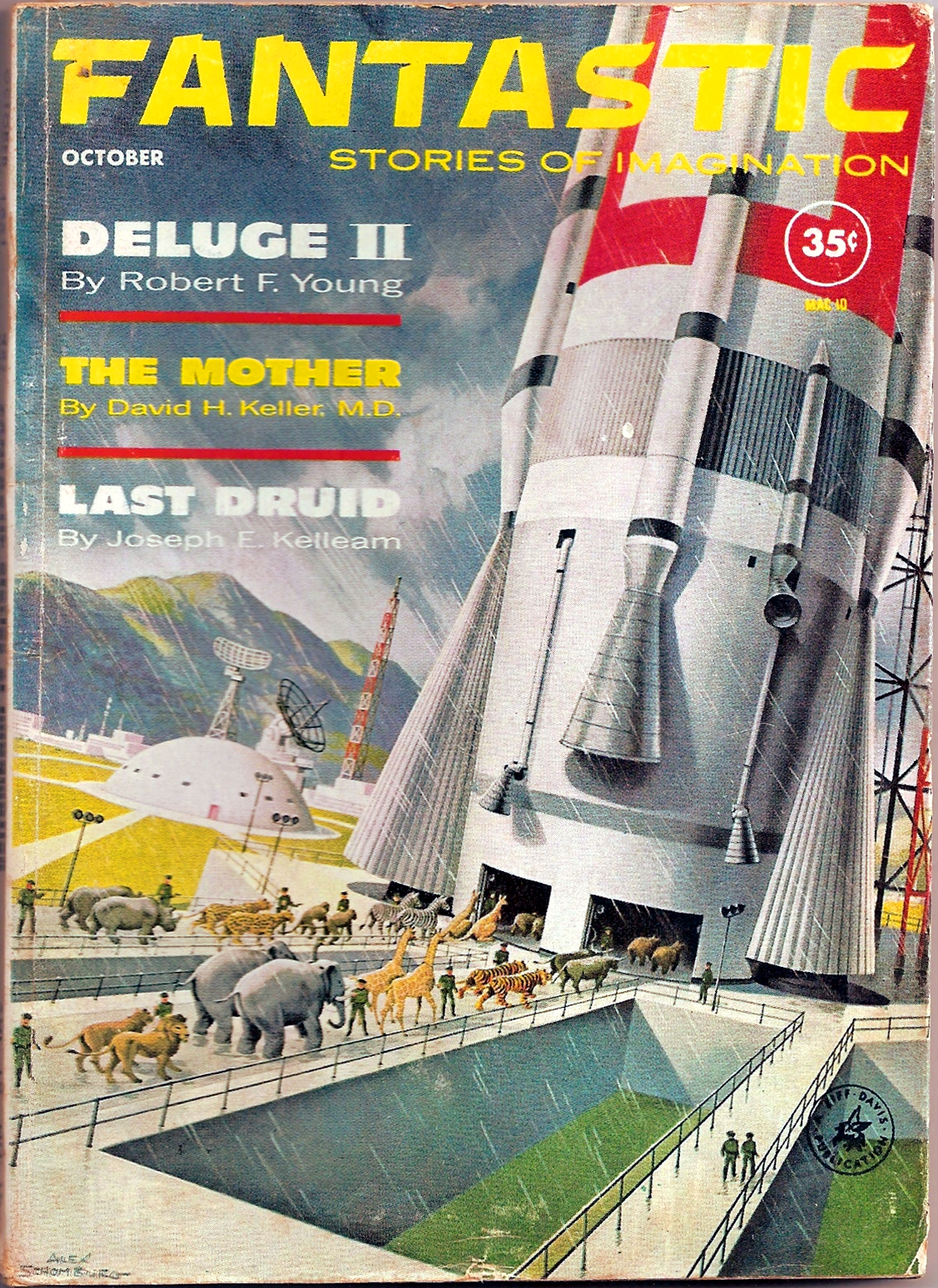
Fantastic October 1961, cover art by Alex Schomburg

- James Allen St. John (1872–1957, US)
- Steele Savage (1898–1970, US)
- John Schoenherr (Hugo) (1935–2010, US)
- Alex Schomburg (1945–1998, Puerto Rica)
- Vicente Segrelles (born 1940, Spain)
- Brian Selznick (born 1966, US)
- Maurice Sendak (1928–2012, US)
- Luigi Serafini (born 1949, Italy)
- Barclay Shaw (born 1949, US)
- You Shiina (unknown, Japan)
- Shusei Nagaoka (1936–2015, Japan)
- John Sibbick (born 1949, UK)
- Daniel Simon (born 1975, Germany)
- Wojciech Siudmak (born 1942, Poland)
- Malcolm Smith (artist) (born US)
- Hajime Sorayama (born 1947, Japan)
- Simon Stålenhag (born 1984, Sweeden)
- Matthew Stawicki (born US)
- Rick Sternbach (born 1951, US) (Hugo)
- Steve Stiles (1943–2020, US)
- Anne Stokes (born UK)
- Drew Struzan (1947-2025, US)
- Anne Sudworth (born UK)
- Arthur Suydam (born 1953, US)
- Darrell K. Sweet (1934–2011, US)

== T ==
- Shaun Tan (born 1974, Australia) (World Fantasy)
- J. P. Targete (born US)
- Geoff Taylor (born 1946, UK)
- Mark Tedin (born US)
- Greg Theakston (1953–2019, US)
- Karel Thole (1914–2000, Netherlands)
- Arthur Thomson (ATom) (1927–1990, UK)
- David Thiérrée (born 1970, France)
- Timothy Truman (born 1956, US)

== V ==
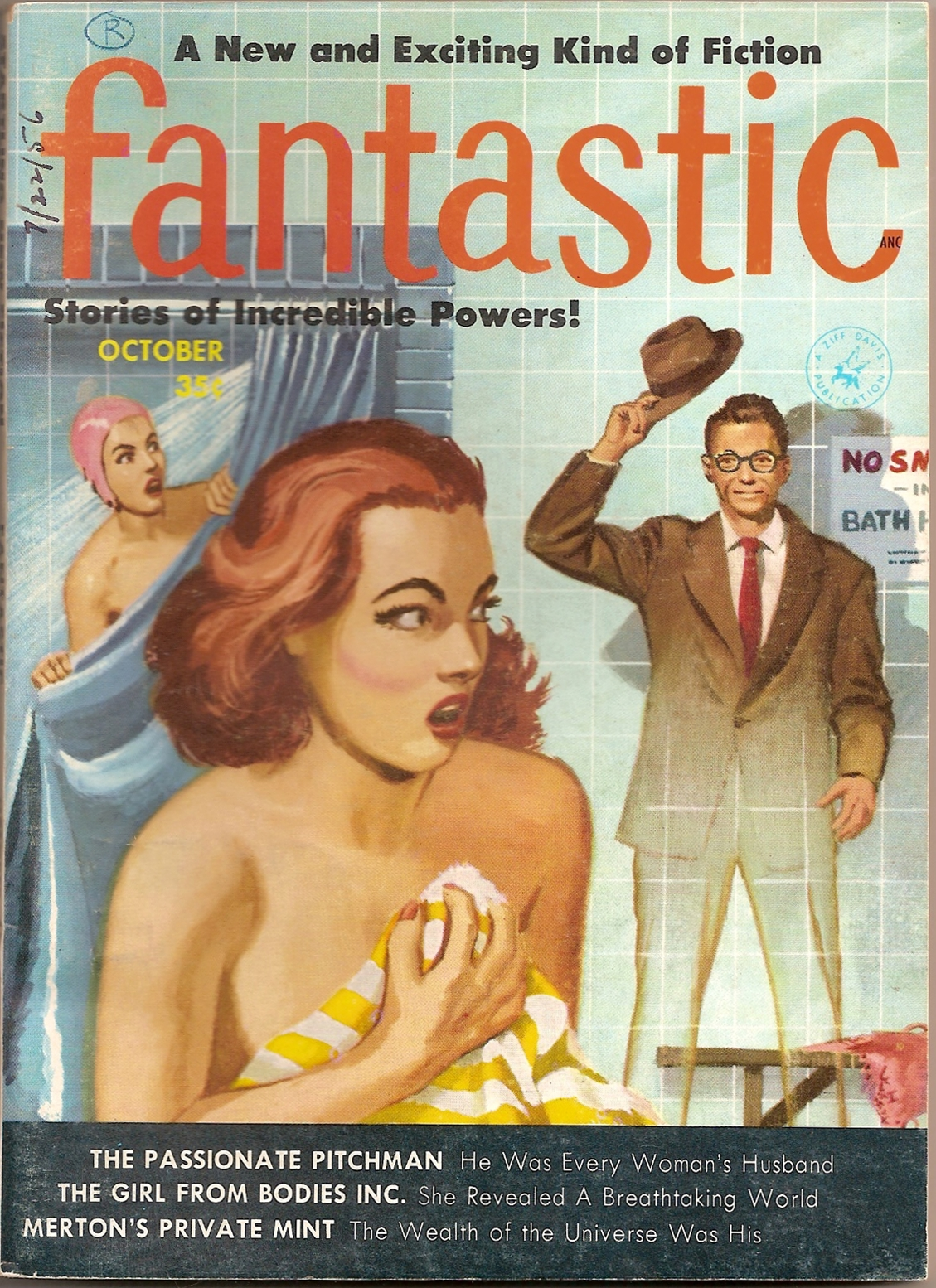
Fantastic October 1956 cover by Ed Valigursky

- Boris Vallejo (born 1941, Peru)
- Ed Valigursky (1926-2009, US)
- Jason Van Hollander (born 1949, US) (World Fantasy)
- Charles Vess (born 1951, US) (World Fantasy)
- H. R. Van Dongen (born 1920, US)

== W ==
- Ron Walotsky (1943–2002, US)
- James Warhola (born 1955, US)
- Kevin Wasden (born US)
- David Wenzel (born 1950, US)
- Paul Wenzel (born 1935, US)
- Michael Whelan (born 1950, US) (Hugo, World Fantasy, Hall of Fame)
- Tim White (1952–2020, UK)
- Eva Widermann (born 1978, Germany)
- Gahan Wilson (1930–2019, US) (World Fantasy)
- Wally Wood (1927–1981, US) (National Cartoonists Society)
- Patrick Woodroffe (1940–2014, UK)
- Bernie Wrightson (1948–2017, US)
- Frank Wu (born 1964, US) (Hugo)
- N. C. Wyeth (1882 – 1945, US)

== Y ==
- Jacek Yerka (born 1952, Poland) (World Fantasy)
- Paul Youll (born 1965, UK)
- Stephen Youll (born 1965, UK)

== Z ==
- Jurgen Ziewe
- Mark Zug (born 1959)

== See also ==
- List of illustrators
