= Trap Door (magazine) =

- Categories: Science-fiction fanzine
- Frequency: Occasional
- Publisher: Robert Lichtman
- First issue: October 1983; 42 years ago
- Language: English

Trap Door is a science-fiction fanzine published by Robert Lichtman, with the first issue appearing in October 1983 and last in 2018.

== History ==
It received nominations for the Hugo Award for Best Fanzine in 1987 and 1992.

The magazine is published irregularly and (especially in more recent years) infrequently. As of December 2018, a total of 34 issues had been published. Although it has never won a Hugo Award – most likely due to its limited circulation not reaching enough Hugo Award voters – the magazine is highly regarded and has won (or placed high) on various polls within the science-fiction fanzine subculture (such as the Fan Activity Achievement Award, which it won in 2000, 2004, 2010, 2011, 2013 and 2014).

A wide range of science-fiction fans and professionals have contributed to the magazine over the years. This list is in the order of their first appearance:

- Chester Anderson
- Paul Williams
- Dan Steffan
- Redd Boggs
- Eric Mayer
- Larry Stark
- Brad Foster
- Jay Kinney
- William Rotsler
- Steve Stiles
- Arthur Thomson (ATom)
- Charles Burbee
- Lee Hoffman
- David Langford
- F. M. Busby
- Sidney Coleman
- Marta Randall
- Wilson "Bob" Tucker
- Steve Green
- Frederik Pohl
- John-Henri Holmberg
- rich brown
- Greg Benford
- James White
- Terry Carr
- Bob Shaw
- Carol Carr
- Karen Haber
- Chuch Harris
- Calvin Demmon
- Geri Sullivan
- Gary Hubbard
- Shelby Vick
- Bill Kunkel
- Ray Nelson
- David Hartwell
- Ted White
- Ross Chamberlain
- Rob Hansen
- Teddy Harvia
- John Foyster
- Arnie Katz
- Candi Strecker
- Dale Speirs
- Jim Harmon
- Ron Bennett
- Richard Brandt
- Gregg Calkins
- John Hertz
- Bill Donaho
- Joe Kennedy
- William Breiding
- Boyd Raeburn
- Avram Davidson
- George Metzger
- Chris Priest
- Joel Nydahl
- Gordon Eklund
- Bob Silverberg
- Michael Dobson
- Bruce Townley
- Andrew Main
- John D. Berry
- Graham Charnock
- John Baxter
- Roy Kettle

== See also ==
- Lists of magazines
