= Steve Stiles =

American cartoonist (1943–2020)

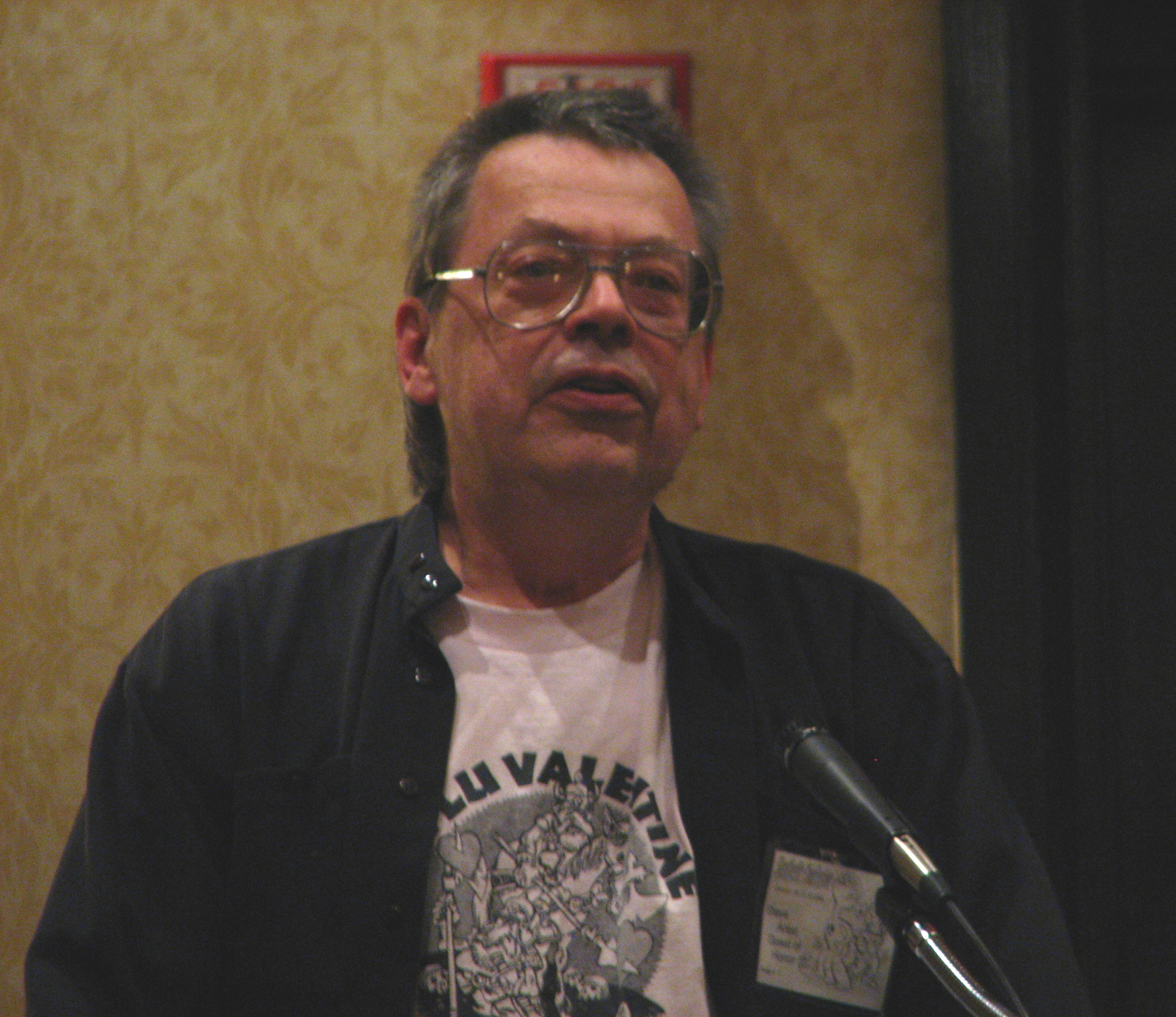
- Stiles in 2006
- Born: July 16, 1943
- Died: January 11, 2020 (aged 76)
- Areas: Cartoonist, Writer, Artist
- Awards: Bill Rotsler Award, 1998; Fan Activity Achievement (FAAn) Award, 2001, 2003–2006; Hugo Award for Best Fan Artist, 2016

Stephen Willis Stiles (July 16, 1943 – January 11, 2020) was an American cartoonist and writer, coming out of the science fiction fanzine tradition. He won the 2016 Hugo Award for Best Fan Artist.

== Early life and education ==
Steven Willis Stiles was born to Norma and Irvin Stiles. He had two brothers, Randy and Jeff.

Stiles studied at The High School of Music & Art and the School of Visual Arts in Manhattan and later wrote about this in his essay, "Art School":

...in 1956, at age 13, I took the entrance exams at M&A, which partly consisted of drawing an arrangement of old shoes and flowers, as well as a review of my portfolio pieces — which included two issues of my first fanzine, Sam; that was a lucky break because my interviewers had never heard of a kid pubbing an ish and thought the whole concept incredibly creative. Four years later, the people over at Visual Arts had the same reaction to some of my other fanzines and awarded me a three-year scholarship. I was blown away by the realization that fandom had actually helped me achieve my goals in the Real World! That's the last time that happened... Music & Art certainly wasn't a full-fledged art school but rather a high school with additional emphasis on art and music classes. Even so, I had more opportunity to familiarize myself with a wider range of materials, from chalks and caseins to oils. And here I was studying in the same school that my heroes Harvey Kurtzman, Bill Elder and John Severin – the guys at Mad — went to, so it was pretty heady.

== Illustration and design ==
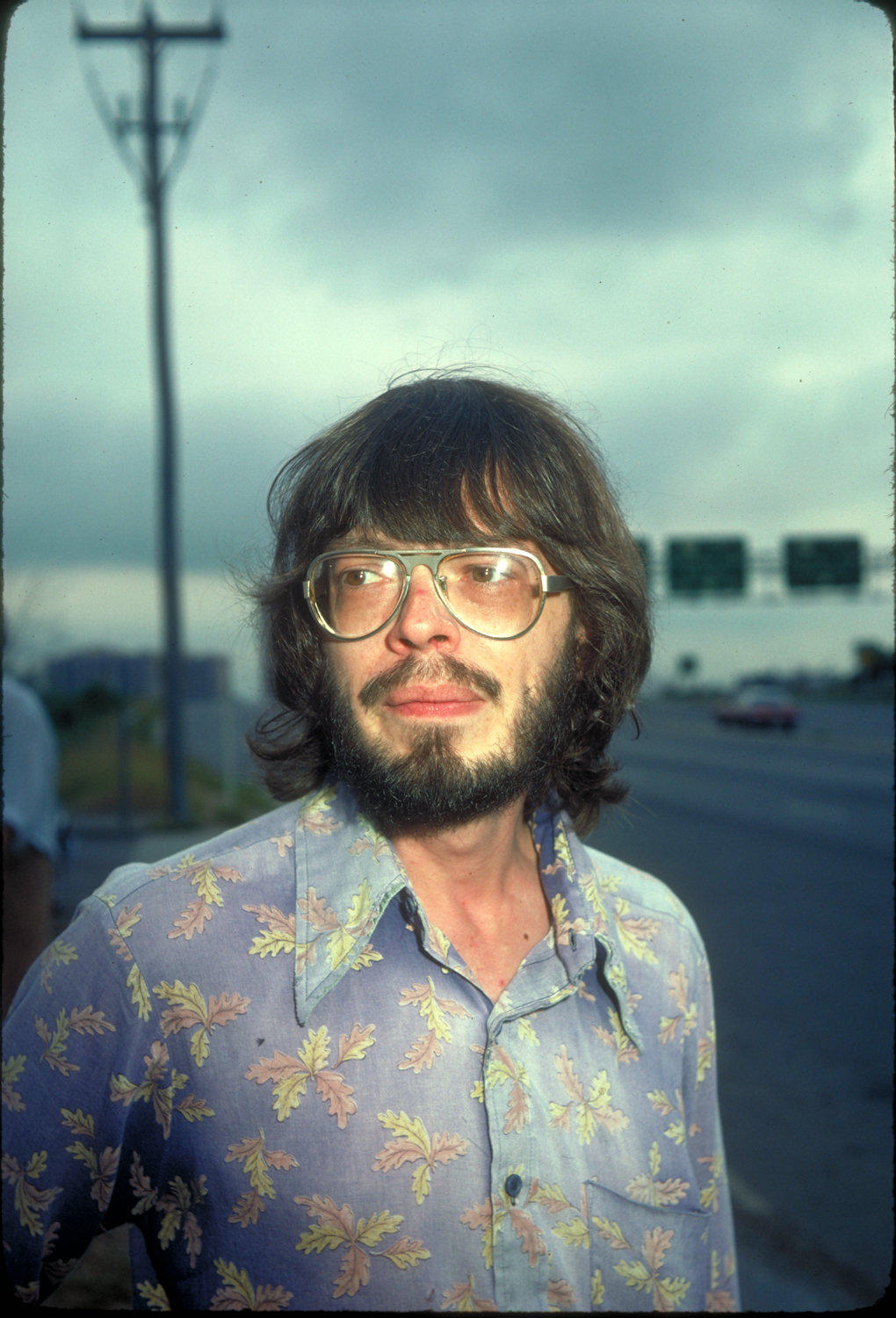
Steve Stiles, Falls Church, Virginia, Spring 1979. Kodachrome 25 by Jeff Schalles

His first cartoon for a fanzine appeared in Cry of the Nameless, edited by F.M. Busby and Elinor Busby. A fanzine interlineation he coined ("Death is nature's way of telling you when to stop") became a national catchphrase after it was reprinted in Pageant in 1962. His work (art and text) has since appeared in leading fanzines (Xero, Void, Mimosa, Trap Door) as well as the more obscure (Vojo de Vivo). He publishes his own fanzine, SAM. There were nine years between SAM #14 and #15, the latter being published in 1983; and SAM #16 was published 31 years later, in 2014, in anticipation of the 2014 Corflu science fiction convention.

== Professional work ==
His first professional sale was in 1961, which was a cartoon for Paul Krassner's The Realist. After a stint in the military as an illustrator, he worked in advertising before becoming a freelancer in 1975. He worked in genres ranging from underground comix to children's books to superhero comics. He designed a Peace and Humanitarian Achievements medal for the Samaritan community in Israel. The medal's first recipient was Shimon Peres.

== Awards ==
In 1968, Stiles was the Trans-Atlantic Fan Fund winner, attending Thirdmancon, the 1968 Eastercon in Buxton, Derbyshire. Harrison Country, a compilation of his writings and drawings about this trip, was published in 2007.

Stiles won eleven Fan Activity Achievement (FAAn) Awards for best artist (2001, 2003–2006, 2010–2012, 2014–2016). In 1998, Stiles won the first Bill Rotsler Award, named after prolific fan artist Bill Rotsler. He was a Hugo Award nominee as Best Fan Artist in 1967, 1968, 2003 through 2008, and 2010 through 2016, winning in 2016.

== Personal life and Death ==
Stiles was married to Elaine Stiles (née Mandell).

On January 7, 2020, Stiles announced his most recent cancer diagnosis on Facebook, "So, the word is: I've got a few months, more or less." He died on January 11, 2020, of the aforementioned cancer.
