= Howard Johnston =

Howard Johnston may refer to:

- Howard Earl Johnston (1928–2001), member of the Canadian House of Commons
- Howard W. Johnston (1913–2005), principal founder of the Free University of Berlin

== See also ==
- Howard-Johnston (surname)
- Howard Johnson (disambiguation)
