= Plokta =

Plokta is a British science-fiction fanzine, first published in 1996, which has won two Hugo Awards. It ceased publication in 2011.

Subtitled "the journal of superfluous technology", the magazine includes articles (largely unrelated to science fiction), photographs, illustrations and cartoons. The production team has been nicknamed "The Plokta Cabal".

The editors are Alison Scott, Steve Davies and Mike Scott. "The Plokta Cabal" also includes Steven Cain, Marianne Cain, Giulia de Cesare and Sue Mason (who has won two individual Hugos for Best Fan Artist). They have also organised a number of related conventions.

Plokta has been nominated nine times for a Hugo Award for Best Fanzine, and won in 2005 and 2006. It also won the Nova Award for Best Fanzine in 2000 and 2002.

The name Plokta is taken from the humorous acronym for "Press Lots Of Keys To Abort", a technique for stopping computer program execution when one does not know the proper procedure to do so.

A Captain Britain villain for Marvel Comics created by Doctor Who writer Paul Cornell has been named 'Dr. Plokta' after the fanzine.
