= Taral Wayne =

Canadian science fiction fan artist (1951–2024)

- Born: October 12, 1951 Toronto, Ontario, Canada
- Died: July 31, 2024 (aged 72) Toronto, Ontario, Canada
- Areas: Cartoonist, Writer, Artist, Inker, Colourist
- Pseudonym: The Romulan Baked Potato
- Awards: Rotsler Award, 2008. Fan Guest of Honour, Anticipation, 2009. Best Canadian Fan Artist award, Canadian Fanzine Fanac awards, 2011.

Wayne MacDonald (October 12, 1951 – July 31, 2024), known by his pen name Taral Wayne, was a Canadian science fiction fan artist who was nominated for the Hugo Award for Best Fan Artist eleven times, from 1987 to 2012. In October 2008 he received the annual Rotsler Award. In recognition of his contributions to science fiction fandom, particularly Canadian fandom, Taral was named Fan Guest of Honour by the 2009 Worldcon, Anticipation.

The pen name Taral originated from a fictional synthetic language, Siroihin, that he described in one of his early science fiction fanzines.

== Career ==
Born in Toronto, Ontario, on October 12, 1951, Wayne began his involvement in science fiction fandom in 1971 when he joined the Ontario Science Fiction Club (OSFiC). Over the years he contributed art and writing to a wide variety of amateur and semi-professional fanzines, as well as publishing his own—Red Shift, Delta Psi, Synapse, New Toy and others. In the late 1980s he made the jump to professional illustration, by necessity working mainly outside the science fiction genre. A west coast American magazine called Ruralite was his main client at that time.

During the 1990s Taral focused more on comic book work. His major achievement was the furry comic title Tales of Beatrix Farmer (a.k.a. Beatrix) (Mu Press and Vision Comics). Created by Steve Gallacci, the stories were a collaborative effort—drawn by Taral, co-written by creator and artist. They tell the story of Beatrix, an ordinary rabbit-girl who is wounded in a drive-by shooting. She is rescued by omnipotent alien beings (visible only to her), who ensure her future safety by wrapping her in a metallic suit that confers invulnerability. She soon discovers that it also renders her completely "safe" from bodily needs—food, drink, sleep, sex, touch, taste, or smell. Forced into the role of superhero for hire, Beatrix yearns to be ordinary again or at least have the option of removing the suit when desired.

Due to generally poor sales in the entire comics industry at the time of the Marvel Comics bankruptcy, the series was dropped after only a few issues. Thereafter the artist contributed short pieces to other comics as time and inclination permitted. Taral also created many back covers for Gremlin Trouble, a comic published by AB Pixilations.

Significant work he did within the SF genre includes the illustration of Rudy Rucker's novel Spaceland (Tor, 2002), restoration of Vaughn Bodé art appearing in fanzines for Rare & Well Done Bode, research and illustration for John Robert Colombo's book Years of Light (Hounslow Press, 1982). He also made contributions to The Fantasy Showcase Tarot Deck (Bruce Pelz, 1980) and Tank Vixens Card Game (United Publications, 2004).

In addition to his art, Taral sold a small number of articles and short stories, worked on TV and cartoon presentations, produced several CDs of art and fan writing, sold tee-shirts, and even designed a postal cancellation for the 1978 Worldcon. The bulk of Taral's career, though, was the creation of art for private commissions, numbering more than 3,000 inked, coloured, or penciled works.

Taral resided in the Parkdale district of Toronto. While still possessing close ties to science fiction fandom, he was rather an outsider in the comics community. In early 2017 he suffered a stroke, from which he subsequently began a slow recovery. He died at his home on July 31, 2024, at the age of 72.
