= Elinor Busby =

American writer

- Born: September 30, 1924; Tacoma, Washington, U.S.
- Spouse: F. M. Busby (m. 1954; died 2005)
- Writing career
- Genre: Science-fiction
- Notable awards: Hugo Award, 1960

Elinor Busby (born September 30, 1924) is an American science fiction writer and fanzine editor. In 1960, she became the first woman to win a Hugo Award.

== Biography ==
Elinor Doub was born in Tacoma, Washington, in 1924. She married editor and writer F. M. Busby in 1954. They had one daughter, Michele.

== Literary career ==
Elinor and F. M. Busby co-edited the fan magazine Cry of the Nameless (later renamed Cry), which won the Hugo Award for Best Fanzine in 1960. They had previously been nominated in 1959 and were nominated again in 1962. Elinor was awarded a Fan Activity Achievement Award for fan achievements, presented at Corflu in 2013.

Busby was a dedicatee of Robert A. Heinlein's 1982 novel Friday, and her husband a dedicatee of Heinlein's later novel, The Cat Who Walks Through Walls.

F. M. Busby died in 2005; Elinor subsequently donated his papers to Rivera Library's Special Collections Department.

== Bibliography ==
=== Short fiction ===
- Time to Kill (1977)
- The Night of the Red, Red Moon (1983)

=== Essays ===
- Letter (Science Fiction Review #21) (1977)
- Letter (Science Fiction Review #31) (1979)
- Friendship (1984)
- Fan Guest of Honor: Jack Speer / Jack Speer (1984)
- Fan Guest of Honor: Elinor Busby (1993)
