= Hojo =

Hojo or Hōjō may refer to:

Hojo or HoJo:

- Howard Johnson's, a U.S. chain of restaurants and hotels
- A nickname for a number of people named Howard Johnson
- A nickname for Howard Jones (British musician), an synthpop singer, musician and songwriter
- A nickname for Howard Jones (American singer), a vocalist for several metalcore bands
- MGR-1 Honest John, the first nuclear-capable missile and a popular airframe for hobby modelers
- Hojo, a supporting character in comic strip Mandrake the Magician
- Professor Hojo, a non-playable character in the video game Final Fantasy VII

Hōjō or Houjou:

- Hōjō, one of the five kata of Kashima Shinden Jikishinkage-ryū
- Hōjō (Inuyasha), a character in the manga and anime series Inuyasha
- Hōjō clan, a family of regents of the Kamakura Shogunate
- Late Hōjō clan, daimyō in the Sengoku Period
- Buntarō Hōjō, a main character in the visual novel series Girls Beyond the Wasteland
- Hōjō, Ehime, a city in Japan
- Emu Hōjō, a main character in the tokusatsu series Kamen Rider Ex-Aid
- Karen Hōjō, a character in the game series The Idolmaster Cinderella Girls
- Muraku Hōjō, a character in the anime series Little Battlers Experience WARS
- Hōjō, Tottori, a town in Japan (part of Hokuei)
- Hōjō Tokiyuki (Scouting) (1858–1929), early Japanese Scouting notable
- Satoko and Satoshi Houjou, from the series Higurashi no Naku Koro ni
- Tsukasa Hojo (born 1959), manga artist and creator of City Hunter
- Reika Hōjō, from Goshūshō-sama Ninomiya-kun
- Kairi Hojo (born 1988), Japanese professional wrestler
- Hōjō Rin, the elder Hōjō brother from Initial D
- Hōjō Gō, the younger Hōjō brother from Initial D
