= 54th World Science Fiction Convention =

54th Worldcon (1996)

L.A.con III, the 54th World Science Fiction Convention
- Genre: Science fiction
- Dates: 29 August–2 September 1996
- Venue: Anaheim Convention Center
- Location: Anaheim, California
- Country: United States
- Attendance: 6,703
- Filing status: 501(c)(3) non-profit

The 54th World Science Fiction Convention (Worldcon), also known as L.A.con III, was held on 29 August–2 September 1996 at the Hilton Anaheim, Anaheim Marriott, and the Anaheim Convention Center in Anaheim, California, United States.

The convention was chaired by Mike Glyer.

== Participants ==
Attendance was 6,703.

=== Guests of honor ===
- James White (writer)
- Roger Corman (media)
- Takumi Shibano & Sachiko Shibano (fan)
- Elsie Wollheim (special guest of honor; died before the convention)
- Connie Willis (toastmaster)

== Awards ==
The World Science Fiction Society administers and presents the Hugo Awards, the oldest and most noteworthy award for science fiction. Selection of the recipients is by vote of the Worldcon members. Categories include novels and short fiction, artwork, dramatic presentations, and various professional and fandom activities.

Other awards may be presented at Worldcon at the discretion of the individual convention committee. This has often included the national SF awards of the host country, such as the Japanese Seiun Awards as part of Nippon 2007, and the Prix Aurora Awards as part of Anticipation in 2009. The Astounding Award for Best New Writer and the Sidewise Award, though not sponsored by the Worldcon, are usually presented, as well as the Chesley Awards, the Prometheus Award, and others. In 2021, the Nommo Awards began presenting at Worldcon.

=== 1996 Hugo Awards ===
The 1996 Hugo Award base includes a reel of film and a moonscape as seen in the 1950 film Destination Moon, as an homage to both that film and the work of artist Chesley Bonestell.

- Best Novel: The Diamond Age by Neal Stephenson
- Best Novella: "The Death of Captain Future" by Allen Steele
- Best Novelette: "Think Like a Dinosaur" by James Patrick Kelly
- Best Short Story: "The Lincoln Train" by Maureen F. McHugh
- Best Non-Fiction Book: Science Fiction: The Illustrated Encyclopedia by John Clute
- Best Dramatic Presentation: "The Coming of Shadows" (Babylon 5 episode)
- Best Original Artwork: Dinotopia: The World Beneath by James Gurney
- Best Professional Editor: Gardner Dozois
- Best Professional Artist: Bob Eggleton
- Best Semiprozine: Locus, edited by Charles N. Brown
- Best Fanzine: Ansible, edited by Dave Langford
- Best Fan Writer: Dave Langford
- Best Fan Artist: William Rotsler

=== 1946 Retro Hugo Awards ===
- Best Novel: The Mule by Isaac Asimov (Astounding, November/December 1945)
- Best Novella: Animal Farm by George Orwell (Secker & Warburg)
- Best Novelette: "First Contact" by Murray Leinster (Astounding, May 1945)
- Best Short Story: "Uncommon Sense" by Hal Clement (Astounding, September 1945)
- Best Dramatic Presentation: The Picture of Dorian Gray
- Best Professional Editor: John W. Campbell, Jr.
- Best Professional Artist: Virgil Finlay
- Best Fanzine: Voice of the Imagi-Nation, edited by Forrest J Ackerman
- Best Fan Writer: Forrest J Ackerman
- Best Fan Artist: William Rotsler

=== Other awards ===
- John W. Campbell Award for Best New Writer: David Feintuch

== See also ==
- Hugo Award
- Science fiction
- Speculative fiction
- World Science Fiction Society
- Worldcon

Preceded by 53rd World Science Fiction Convention; Intersection in Glasgow, UK (1995)	List of Worldcons; 54th World Science Fiction Convention; L.A.con III in Anaheim, California, United States (1996)	Succeeded by 55th World Science Fiction Convention; LoneStarCon 2 in San Antonio, Texas, United States (1997)
