= Christopher J. Garcia =

American writer and editor

Christopher J. Garcia is an American writer and editor. He is known for his works on Journey Planet.

== Biography ==
In 1999, Garcia joined the Computer History Museum and became the museum curator. In 2021, he was employed as an archivist for Forever Saroyan literary foundation.

== Works ==
Garcia started his first fanzine The Drink Tank, in 2005. It was nominated for the Hugo Award for Best Fanzine from 2007 through 2013, winning in 2011. The 2011 acceptance speech was nominated for the 2012 Hugo Award for Best Dramatic Presentation. He was nominated for the Hugo Award for Best Fan Writer from 2007 through 2013.

He began publishing Journey Planet in 2008, with the first issue being created at the Eastercon as a program item. Journey Planet has been nominated for several awards, including the European Science Fiction Award and The Hugo Award for Best Fanzine. It won the Nova Award for Best Fanzine in 2010. and the Hugo Award for Best Fanzine in 2015.
