= Sue Mason =

British artist

Sue Mason is a British illustrator of science fiction fanzines and other works. She has won two Hugo Awards.

== Background ==
Mason claims to have been thrown out of Sunday School at the age of 12 for wanting to be The Morrigan when she grew up. She became part of science fiction fandom in 1982.

== Science fiction fandom ==
Mason is best known in worldwide science fiction fandom for her "whimsical, humorous and richly-detailed" pen-and-ink illustrations in the fanzine Plokta and elsewhere, some of which have been collected in the chapbook I Want to Be a Celtic Death Goddess When I Grow Up. She was the winner of the Trans-Atlantic Fan Fund in 2000, and described herself in her platform statement as "gamer, filker, costumer, dealer, apahack. On the committee of a filkcon and an Eastercon. I Mced the Glasgow Worldcon masquerade".

Mason was nominated for the Hugo Award for Best Fan Artist every year from 2001 to 2010, and won it in 2003 and 2005. She lives near Manchester. She has won the Nova Award for Best Fan Artist seven times. She won the 2014 William Rotsler#Rotsler Award "for long-time artistic achievement in amateur publications of the science fiction community".
