= Howard Johnson =

Howard Johnson may refer to:

== Music ==
- Howard Johnson (lyricist) (1887–1941), American songwriter
- Howard E. Johnson (musician) (1908–1991), American swing alto saxophonist
- Howie Johnson (drummer) (1932–1987), drummer for American rock band The Ventures
- Howard Johnson (jazz musician) (1941–2021), American jazz tubist
- Howard Johnson (soul singer) (born 1956), American R&B singer

== Sports ==
- Howard Johnson (American football) (1916–1945), American football offensive lineman
- Howard Johnson (footballer) (1925–2015), English footballer
- Howard Johnson (baseball) (born 1960), American baseball player
- Howard Johnson (cricketer) (born 1964), American cricketer
- Howie Johnson (1925–2015), American professional golfer
- Monk Johnson (Howard Johnson, 1894–1973), American baseball player

== Other people ==
- Howard Johnson (electrical engineer) (born 20th century), in signal integrity and high speed electronic circuit design
- Howard Johnson (politician) (1910–2000), British Conservative politician
- Howard A. Johnson (1893–1974), Montana Supreme Court justice
- Howard A. Johnson, Jr., special effects artist, see Academy Award for Best Visual Effects
- Howard E. Johnson (art director) (fl. 1956–1984), American art director
- Howard David Johnson (born 1954), American painter
- Howard Deering Johnson (1897–1972), American founder of Howard Johnson's restaurants
- Howard Hille Johnson (1846–1913), American blind educator and writer
- Howard R. Johnson (inventor) (1919–2008), inventor of an alleged perpetual motion device
- Howard R. Johnson (1903–1944), commander of the U.S. Army 501st Parachute Infantry Regiment during World War II
- Howard Wesley Johnson (1922–2009), American educator; former president of the Massachusetts Institute of Technology
- Stretch Johnson (Howard Eugene Johnson, 1915–2000), American tap dancer and activist

== Other uses ==
- Howard Johnson's, a chain of hotels and restaurants

== See also ==
- Howard Johnston (disambiguation)
