= Trapdoor (disambiguation) =

A trapdoor is a door set into a floor or ceiling.

Trapdoor or Trap Door may also refer to:

- Trap Door (magazine), a science fiction fanzine
- The Trap Door, a British animated TV series
  - The Trap Door (video game), a computer game based on the animated series
- Trapdoor (software), a piece of computer software used for network administration
- Trapdoor (company), a video game developer
- Trapdoor function, a type of mathematical function used in cryptography
- "Trapdoor", in computing, an outdated synonym for "backdoor", a method used to circumvent normal authorization
- "Trap Door" Springfield, a single-shot breechloading rifle designed and produced at Springfield Armory during the late 19th century
- Trapdoor spider, a spider
- Trap Door Spiders, a literary society
- Trapdoor mechanism for breech loading rifles

== Music ==
- Trap Door (EP), an EP by T-Bone Burnett, or the title song
- "Trap Door", a song by Joey Badass from his album Summer Knights
- "Trapdoor", a song by King Gizzard & the Lizard Wizard from their album Paper Mâché Dream Balloon
- "Trap Door", a song by OneRepublic from their album Waking Up
- "Trap Door", a song by Ozzy Osbourne from Black Rain
- "Trapdoor", a song by Twenty One Pilots from their self-titled album
