= Charles Binger =

English American artist and illustrator

Cover art for the Perry Mason paperback The Case Of The Foot-loose Doll (1958), by Charles Binger

Charles Ashford Binger (October 12, 1907, in London – 1974) was an English American artist and illustrator.

During the 1920s and 1930s, Binger began his career painting film posters for Twentieth Century Fox UK, then served in World War II as a member of the London Fire Service and Air Sea Rescue. He also supplied art for campaigns such as the wartime English Savings Bond Campaign. After the war, he moved to New York City, and began painting covers for Colliers Magazine, Fawcett Publications, Signet Books, Pyramid Books, Pocket Books, Bantam Books, Avon Books, and other publishers. His cover art was used on books by Nathanael West, Aldous Huxley, John Collier, Ray Bradbury, Erle Stanley Gardner and many more. Binger continued to paint movie posters, for such films as River of No Return, Titanic, The Song of Bernadette, Run Silent Run Deep, The Glass Menagerie and The Comancheros. Binger was also a popular pin-up artist. He is perhaps best remembered for his science fiction covers in the 1950s, and for his covers for hard-boiled detective pulps.

Binger continued to work until 1970, and died in 1974. A major retrospective show of his work was held in Los Angeles in 2011.
