= Journey Planet =

Science fiction fanzine

- Editors: James Bacon, Christopher J Garcia, et al.
- Categories: Fanzine
- Frequency: Irregular
- First issue: 2008
- Based in: Dublin, Ireland & Boulder Creek, California
- Language: English
- Website: www.journeyplanet.org

Journey Planet is an Irish-American science fiction fanzine currently edited by James Bacon, Christopher J. Garcia and various other co-editors. It has been nominated fourteen times for the Hugo Award for Best Fanzine, winning in 2015.

== Description ==
Journey Planet began as a Fanzine-in-an-hour program item at the 2008 Eastercon at Heathrow. Bacon and Garcia headed up the item and produced the first version of issue 1. After the convention, Claire Brialey came on-board as editor, and remained through issue #9. Ever since, Garcia and Bacon have teamed with an ever-changing roster of co-editors on themed issues.

Guest editors have included Michael Carroll, John Coxon, Vincent Docherty, Sara Felix, Colin Harris, Esther MacCallum-Stewart, Alissa McKersie, Errick Nunnally, Pádraig Ó Méalóid, Lynda E. Rucker, Chuck Serface, Steven H Silver, Erin Underwood, Linda Wenzelburger, Pete Young, and others.

The zine has carried material, both written and artistic, from professionals and fans, including Gail Carriger, Rian Johnson, Mary Robinette Kowal, Seanan McGuire, Maura McHugh, Peter Sagal, Dez Skinn, and many others. It has also run interviews with figures such as Neil Gaiman, Alan Moore, Mel Ramos, and John Scalzi.

Each issue is themed, with most themes being in the realm of science fiction, fandom, or comics. Other topics have included historical personages, such as Richard III, historical moments such as World War I, or authors like Flann O'Brien. The editors have twice run bilingual issues, the first in English and Russian, and the second in English and Chinese.

Journey Planet has 14 Hugo nominations for Best Fanzine (being nominated every year from 2012 to 2026, excluding 2016, and receiving the award in 2015), won the European Science Fiction Society's European Science Fiction Award twice, the Alfie, and a Nova Award for Best Fanzine in 2010.

== Awards and nominations ==
=== Hugo Award for Best Fanzine ===
Year	Editors	Result	Ref.
2012	James Bacon and Christopher J Garcia	Finalist	
2013	James Bacon, Christopher J Garcia, Emma J. King, Helen J. Montgomery, and Pete Young	Finalist	
2014	James Bacon, Christopher J Garcia, Lynda E. Rucker, Pete Young, Colin Harris, and Helen J. Montgomery	Finalist	
2015	James Bacon, Christopher J Garcia, Colin Harris, Alissa McKersie, and Helen J. Montgomery	Won	
2017	James Bacon, Christopher J Garcia, Esther MacCallum-Stewart, Helena Nash, Errick Nunnally, Pádraig Ó Méalóid, Chuck Serface, and Erin Underwood	Finalist	
2018	James Bacon, Christopher J Garcia, Michael Carroll, Vince Docherty, Jackie Kamlot, Mark Meenan, Helen Montgomery, Pádraig Ó Méalóid, Chuck Serface, and Steven H Silver (as Team Journey Planet)	Finalist	
2019	James Bacon, Christopher J Garcia, Michael Carroll, John Coxon, Sarah Gulde, Professor Anthony Roche, Merlin Roche, and Chuck Serface (as Team Journey Planet)	Finalist	
2020	James Bacon, Christopher J Garcia, John Coxon, Ann Gry, Alissa McKersie, Chuck Serface, and Steven H Silver	Finalist	
2021	James Bacon, Christopher J Garcia, Michael Carroll, John Coxon, Sara Felix, Ann Gry, Sarah Gulde, Alissa McKersie, Errick Nunnally, Pádraig Ó Méalóid, Chuck Serface, Steven H Silver, Paul Trimble, and Erin Underwood.	Finalist	
2022	James Bacon, Christopher J Garcia, Erin Underwood, Jean Martin, Sara Felix, Vanessa Applegate, Chuck Serface, Errick Nunnally, Evan Reeves, and Steven H Silver	Finalist	
2023	James Bacon, Christopher J Garcia, John Coxon, Sara Felix, Arthur Liu, Jean Martin, Pádraig Ó Méalóid, Yen Ooi, Olav Rokne, Chuck Serface, Steven H Silver, Erin Underwood, Amanda Wakaruk, Alissa Wales, and Regina Kanyu Wang	Finalist	
2024	James Bacon, Christopher J Garcia, Michael Carroll, Vincent Docherty, Sara Felix, Ann Gry, Sarah Gulde, Allison Hartman Adams, Arthur Liu, Jean Martin, Helena Nash, Pádraig Ó Méalóid, Yen Ooi, Chuck Serface, Alan Stewart, Regina Kanyu Wang	Finalist	
2025	Allison Hartman Adams, Sara Felix, David Ferguson, Ann Gry, Sarah Gulde, Jean Martin, Olav Rokne, Chuck Serface, Steven H Silver, Amanda Wakaruk, Paul Weimer, Christopher J. Garcia, and James Bacon.	Finalist	
2026	Allison Hartman Adams, Jean Martin, Steven H Silver, Christopher J. Garcia, James Bacon	Finalist	
