= Ditto (convention) =

Ditto was a science fiction fanzine convention held annually in the autumn in North America. It was named after the ditto machine, which was commonly used to print fanzines before the advent of cheap photocopying.

The first Ditto was held in 1988 in Toronto for fans who could not attend the Corflu convention, which was in Seattle that year. Affordability became a goal for the organizers of each succeeding Ditto, along with finding "interesting sites." Ditto was held roughly six months after Corflu, and the location was generally on the opposite side of North America. Regional groups took turns hosting Ditto. Later Dittos sites included Seattle, Washington (1995), Eugene, Oregon (2003), Orlando, Florida (2004), and Milwaukee, Wisconsin (2005). The last was held in 2007 Mendocino County, California.
