= Sara Felix =

American science fiction illustrator

- Sara Felix at LAcon V (Worldcon 2026)
- Known for: Science fiction illustration
- Style: Mixed-media
- Awards: Hugo Award for Best Fan Artist
- Website: https://www.sarafelix.com/wp/

Sara Felix is an American science fiction illustrator who is president of the Association of Science Fiction and Fantasy Artists.

== Artistic career ==
Felix got her start working at a science fiction and mystery book store in Austin, Texas. She began to work on conventions in 1999, leading her to design logos for cons like ArmadilloCon, World Fantasy, and Eastercon. In addition, Felix has designed two Hugo Awards and four Lodestar Awards, among others.

She was on a number of HGTV crafting-focused shows like Crafters Coast to Coast in her younger years.

Felix is a multimedia artist who works with a variety of mediums, including, but not limited to, alcohol inks, acrylic paints, resin, and clay. In an interview with Locus magazine, Felix compared using inks for colorful space backgrounds to chromatography experiments.

Since the beginning of her career, Felix has received five Hugo nominations and two Chelsey nominations. She has won the Hugo Award for Best Fan Artist two times, once in 2021 and once in 2025.

Felix is an editor for the fanzine Journey Planet; one of the covers she painted won the Fanzine Activity Achievement Award.

== Personal life ==
Felix lives in Austin, Texas with her husband Keith and two children. They have a cat named Cheeto.

On April 13, 2025, Felix's recently constructed home exploded due to a propane gas leak. The explosion damaged other nearby homes and left six people injured, including Felix's husband. He suffered severe injuries, such as burns, and had to go through emergency surgery. Over $25,000 has been raised for them.
