= Arthur Thomson (fanzines) =

Arthur Thomson (1927–1990) was a British artist and writer, a highly regarded member of British science fiction fandom from the 1950s onwards, both as a fanzine writer/editor and prolific artist (under the name "ATom"). Resident illustrator for the influential fanzine Hyphen, he won the TransAtlantic Fan Fund in 1964 and visited the United States (an event he wrote up for the following year's ATom Abroad). Thomson was nominated five times for the Hugo Award for Best Fan Artist, but never won.

Nearly two decades after his death, Thomson's distinctive artwork still appears in such fanzines as the Hugo-nominated, Nova Award-winning Banana Wings. After Thomson won the 2000 Rotsler Award, it was decided not to present the Rotsler posthumously again.
