= Association of Science Fiction and Fantasy Artists =

ASFA
- Association of Science Fiction and Fantasy Artists
- Headquarters: Harrisburg, Pennsylvania
- Award: Chesley Awards
- Website: https://asfa-art.ning.com/

The Association of Science Fiction and Fantasy Artists (ASFA) is a non-profit, educational association, whose membership is made up of amateur and professional artists, art directors, art show managers, publishers and collectors involved in the visual arts of science fiction, fantasy, mythology and related topics. It is currently based in Harrisburg, Pennsylvania. The current president is Hugo Award-winning Sara Felix.

ASFA current president Sara Felix

== Mission ==
ASFA's purpose is to encourage and develop amateur artistic talent, educate the public, publishers, patrons of the arts and anyone interested in works of these particularly types of art and craftsmanship in the rights, needs and problems of the people involved in the creation of this material. In order to support diversity, ASFA has sponsored memberships for BIPOC artists. ASFA is generally against AI-generated art.

== Chesley Awards ==
Each year ASFA gives out the Chesley Awards, named for the astronomical artist Chesley Bonestell. The Chesleys were started in 1985 as a means for the SF and Fantasy art community to recognize individual works and achievements during the previous year.
