= Joan Hanke-Woods =

Delphyne Joan Hanke-Woods (November 11, 1945 – September 16, 2013) was an American science fiction artist and fan, whose name is sometimes credited as joan hanke-woods, delphyne joan hanke-woods, delphyne woods, or Mori. She won the Hugo Award for Best Fan Artist in 1986, after having been nominated for the award every year since 1980 (inclusive). In 1984, she was the Fan Guest of Honor at Windycon.

While best known as a fan, she also worked professionally, illustrating works by Philip José Farmer, Michael Resnick, Theodore Sturgeon, and A. E. van Vogt, among others.

She was taught to read by her grandfather in 1949, using his son's 1930s science fiction and fantasy pulp magazines stored in the attic. She later worked as a typesetter, and in the computer industry.
