= Jurgen Ziewe =

German artist, designer, and out-of-body experiencer (born 1947)

Jurgen Ziewe is a German artist, designer, and out-of-body experiencer.

== Biography ==
Ziewe trained as an artist at The Hamburg Academy of Art. He moved to England in 1975 and worked as a designer at multiple agencies. He also produced abstract paintings. Ziewe now produces computer art, employing fractal elements. His influences include the archetypes of Carl Jung, and his work has featured on fantasy posters, greeting cards, and science fiction book covers for authors including Vernor Vinge and Peter F. Hamilton. In 1997 a book showcasing his work, entitled New Territories, was published.

Ziewe sees dream-like states as being another form of reality. By his own account, he has since 1975 had out-of-body experiences and interactions with interdimensional beings in other dimensions of existence, accessed via meditation and lucid dreaming.

== Bibliography ==
- Nigel Suckling, Jurgen Ziewe (1997). New Territories: The Computer Visions of Jurgen Ziewe. Overlook Press. ISBN 0879518111.
- Multidimensional Man. Jurgen Ziewe. 2008. ISBN 978-1409224259.
- The Ten Minute Moment. Lulu Enterprises Incorporated. 2013. ISBN 978-1291603064.
- Vistas of Infinity - How to Enjoy Life When You Are Dead. Lulu Press, Inc. 2015. ISBN 978-1326380748.
- Elysium Unveiled - A Visual Odyssey of Life Eternal. Jurgen Ziewe. 2023. ISBN 978-1-66640-525-5.
- Elysium Illuminated - An Illustrated Testament to Eternal Life. Jurgen Ziewe. 2026. ISBN 978-1-0369-5424-6.
