= Howard-Johnston (surname) =

People with the surname Howard-Johnston include:

- Clarence "Johnny" Howard-Johnston, 1903-1996, Royal Navy officer
- James Howard-Johnston, born 12 March 1942, English historian of the Byzantine Empire (son of Clarence Howard-Johnston)
