= Ilene Meyer =

- Born: December 30, 1939; Seattle, Washington
- Died: June 3, 2009 (aged 69); Gig Harbor, Washington
- Known for: Painting
- Website: MeyerWorld

Ilene Meyer was a self-trained oil painter whose works combined realism and fantasy.

== Biography ==
At the age of seven she contributed work to a time capsule at Alki Point, Seattle. She made her career as an oil painter in the 1970s with her first solo exhibition in 1979.

Her early work was based on the fruit and flowers she used as models, with real and imagined animals joining these as time progressed. Her work became popular in the fantasy art world, gracing the cover of books by James K. Morrow, Philip K. Dick, Marion Zimmer Bradley and other science fiction and fantasy authors. F.X. Schmid produced puzzles based on her paintings. She also became more popular in Japan than in her home country.
