= Bobby Sichran =

American singer-songwriter (died 2015)

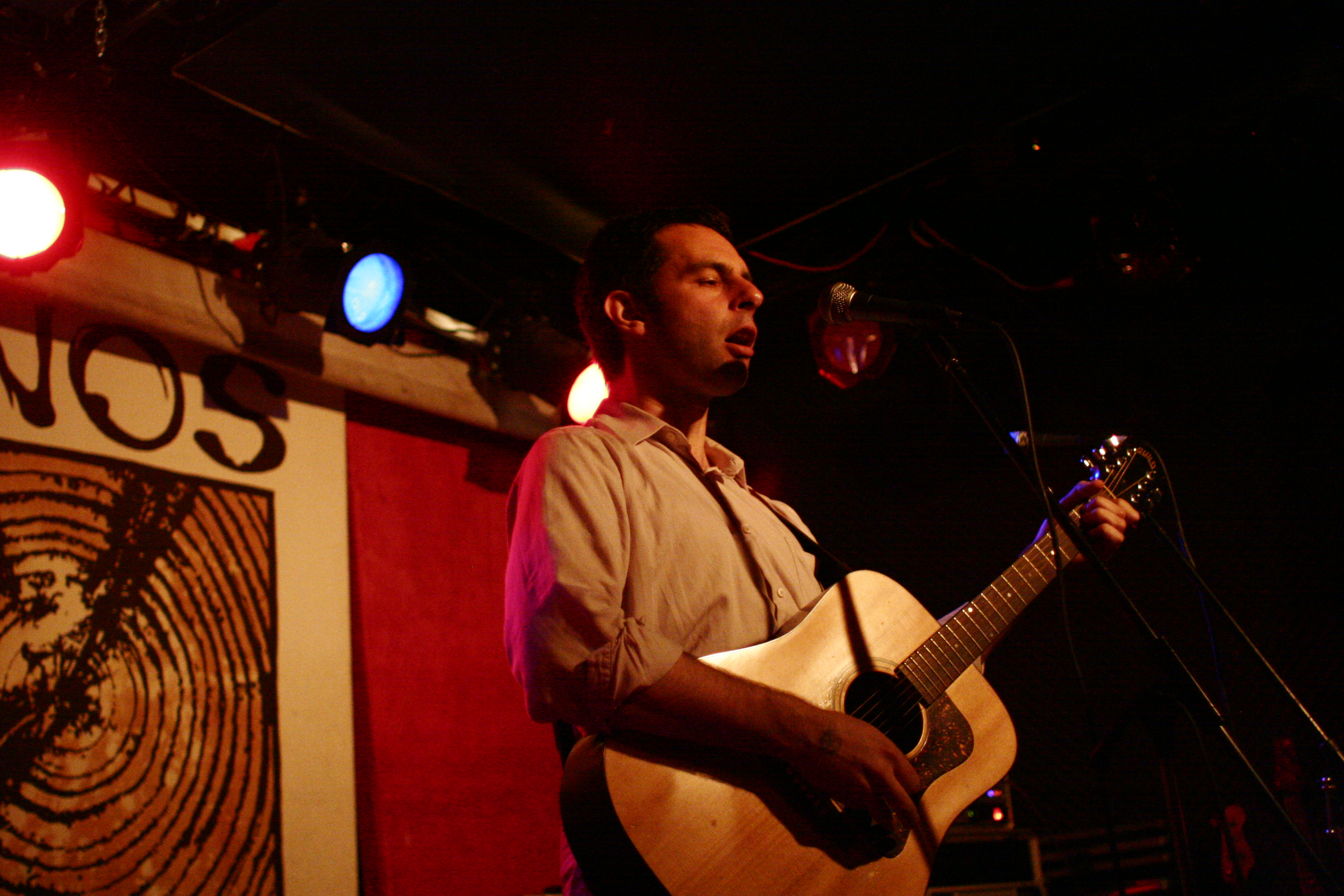
Bobby Sichran performing on June 12, 2007.

Bobby Sichran (born Robert Lichtman; died February 2015) was a Jewish-American alternative hip hop musician. His music was often described as combining hip hop with several other musical genres, such as blues rock and folk music. His fusion of these genres has led many critics to compare him to Beck, and, in some cases, even say that he originated the fusion of folk and hip hop before Beck made it famous. Others have compared him to Bob Dylan, but Sichran criticized such comparisons, saying that he would "never want [his] music to exist on comparisons to someone else."

== Early career ==
A native of Long Island, Sichran dropped out of Columbia University in the early 1990s, looking for a musical career. While doing so, he worked as a furniture mover for some time before getting his big break after knocking on the door of Public Enemy's studio. After Hank Shocklee let him in at his request, Sichran ended up working as an apprentice engineer in their studio, and later played guitar on and produced Das EFX's debut album, Dead Serious.

== Solo career ==
On May 3, 1994, Sichran released his debut album, From a Sympathetical Hurricane, on Columbia Records. It was preceded by the single "Stray Dog." Record executive David Kahne said with regard to the album that "Every time I listen to this record, I hear more stuff." Nevertheless, the album was not promoted by Columbia, and ended up being a commercial flop. After the album was released, its title track was also released as a single. Billboard named this single a "pick" and wrote that it was "fueled with the raw rhythm sensibility of a hip-hop jam, and topped with a classic pop/rock melody and freewheeling instrumentation that is positively funky." Sichran went on to release a 7" single in 1997 entitled "All the Psychotics in My Building" on Messenger Records, the B-side of which, "There's So Much You Could Love," appeared on "Wouldn't it Be Beautiful?", a 1999 Messenger compilation album. He released a 12" in 1998 entitled "Smoke of the Ghetto", which was described as being a preview of an upcoming album of the same name; however, this album was never released. He later helped compose the music for the musical Fetish, which was first performed at the theatre of Marymount Manhattan College Theater in 1998.

Sichran released his second studio album, Peddler in Babylon, in 2007. According to the Columbia Spectator, Sichran conceived Peddler in Babylon as "a concept album about the modern American's crisis of faith".

== Reviews ==
The Calgary Herald gave From A Sympathetical Hurricane a B+ grade, writing that it "...won't lift you off your feet, but it will move you farther down the road with its cool, cool breeze at your back." A review of its title track and single in Billboard described the track as "fueled with the raw rhythm sensibility of a hip-hop jam" and its instrumentation as "positively funky". Robert Christgau wrote that there were only two good songs, or "choice cuts", on the album: its title track and "Don't Break My Heart, Kid".

A review of Peddler in Babylon in the Jerusalem Post described it as "a heady meditation on spiritual exile that doesn't badger the listener with yiddishkeit, but clearly bears a Jewish soul." In a less favorable review, Charles Ubaghs of Drowned in Sound gave the album a 4 out of 10 rating, writing that "It's a nice effort, but that's the problem with Peddler In Babylon: it's nice, and nothing more."

== Discography ==
=== Studio albums ===
- From a Sympathetical Hurricane (1994) – Columbia Records
- Peddler in Babylon (2007) – Bombi Beat Media

=== Singles ===
- Soundboy Limbo (1994) – Kings Crown (as Singing Teeth with Vincent Hans)
- All the Psychotics in My Building (1996) – Messenger Records (7")
- Smoke of the Ghetto (1998) – (12") Soupfly Records
