= Nova Awards =

UK sf fan awards

The Nova Awards were presented annually, between 1973 and 2014, at the UK science fiction convention Novacon and recognised achievement in British and Irish sf fanzines.

When initiated in 1973, members of Novacon could nominate fanzines but the actual judging was done by a panel of well-known fans, none of who could be said to be directly connected to a group or specific fanzine.

In 1974 the judging panel were unable to reach a consensus and so the award was given jointly to Zimri and Big Scab. In 1975 the panel announced that while they had wanted to give the award to Wrinkled Shrew they felt that under the rules it had to go to Maya. The manner of the presentation led to some criticism in fanzines at the time. From 1977 the judging panel was discontinued and the award was decided by popular vote of Novacon members able to demonstrate a basic familiarity with the field. Following a debate at Novacon 39 and follow-up discussions at Novacon 40, the rules were changed in 2011 to allow voting by non-Novacon members resident in the UK and Eire able to meet the 'familiarity' criterion.

Originally there was a sole award for best fanzine. From 1981 Novas were also presented to the best fanzine writer and best fanzine artist and from 1995 there were occasional committee awards for 'best fan'.

Past administrators have included Dave Langford, Pam Wells, Paul Vincent, Martin Tudor, Sandra Bond and Tony Berry. In 2009, Steve Green stepped down after seven years in the post, and Tudor resumed the reins; Tudor was unable to see the year out and Green returned to run the 2010 Novas.

In March 2015, Novacon 45 announced the main categories were being retired, although occasional 'committee awards' might still be made.

== Past winners ==
| Year | Best Fanzine | Best Fan Writer | Best Fan Artist |
|---|---|---|---|
| 1973 | Speculation #32, ed. Peter Weston | NA | NA |
| 1974 | (tie) Zimri #6, ed. Lisa Conesa; Big Scab #2, ed. John Brosnan | NA | NA |
| 1975 | Maya #8, ed. Rob Jackson | NA | NA |
| 1976 | Maya, ed. Rob Jackson | NA | NA |
| 1977 | Twll-Ddu, ed. Dave Langford | NA | NA |
| 1978 | Gross Encounters, ed. Alan Dorey | NA | NA |
| 1979 | Seamonsters, ed. Simone Walsh | NA | NA |
| 1980 | One-Off, ed. Dave Bridges | NA | NA |
| 1981 | Tappen, ed. Malcolm Edwards | Chris Atkinson | Pete Lyon |
| 1982 | Epsilon, ed. Rob Hansen | Chris Atkinson | Rob Hansen |
| 1983 | A Cool Head, ed. Dave Bridges | Dave Bridges | Margaret Welbank |
| 1984 | Xyster, ed. Dave Wood | Anne Hammill | D West |
| 1985 | Prevert, ed. John Jarrold | Abi Frost | Ros Calverly |
| 1986 | Pink Fluffy Bedsocks, ed. Owen Whiteoak | Owen Whiteoak | Arthur Thomson ("Atom") |
| 1987 | Lip, ed. Hazel Ashworth | D West | D West |
| 1988 | Lip, ed. Hazel Ashworth | Michael Ashley | D West |
| 1989 | VSOP, ed. Jan Orys | Simon Polley | Dave Mooring |
| 1990 | Fuck the Tories, ed. Joseph Nicholas, Judith Hanna | Dave Langford | Dave Mooring |
| 1991 | Saliromania, ed. Michael Ashley | Michael Ashley | D West |
| 1992 | Bob?, ed. Ian Sorensen | Michael Ashley | Dave Mooring |
| 1993 | Lagoon, ed. Simon Ounsley | Simon Ounsley | Dave Mooring |
| 1994 | Rastus Johnson’s Cakewalk, ed. Greg Pickersgill | Greg Pickersgill | D West |
| 1995 | Attitude, ed. Michael Abbott, John Dallman, Pam Wells | Simon Ounsley | D West |
| 1996 | Banana Wings, ed. Claire Brialey, Mark Plummer | Alison Freebairn | D West |
| 1997 | Banana Wings, ed. Claire Brialey, Mark Plummer | Mark Plummer | Sue Mason |
| 1998 | Banana Wings, ed. Claire Brialey, Mark Plummer | Maureen Kincaid Speller | D West |
| 1999 | Barmaid, ed. Yvonne Rowse | Yvonne Rowse | Sue Mason |
| 2000 | Plokta, ed. Alison Scott, Steve Davies, Mike Scott | Yvonne Rowse | Sue Mason |
| 2001 | Head, ed. Doug Bell, Christina Lake | Alison Freebairn | Dave Hicks |
| 2002 | Plokta, ed. Alison Scott, Steve Davies, Mike Scott | Claire Brialey | Dave Hicks |
| 2003 | Zoo Nation, ed. Pete Young | Claire Brialey | Sue Mason |
| 2004 | Zoo Nation, ed. Pete Young | Claire Brialey | Sue Mason |
| 2005 | Banana Wings, ed. Claire Brialey, Mark Plummer | Claire Brialey | Alison Scott |
| 2006 | Banana Wings, ed. Claire Brialey, Mark Plummer | Claire Brialey | Sue Mason |
| 2007 | Prolapse, ed. Peter Weston | Mark Plummer | Alison Scott |
| 2008 | Prolapse, ed. Peter Weston | Claire Brialey | Alison Scott |
| 2009 | Banana Wings, eds. Claire Brialey, Mark Plummer | Claire Brialey | Sue Mason |
| 2010 | Journey Planet, eds. Christopher J Garcia, James Bacon, Claire Brialey | Mark Plummer | Arthur "Atom" Thomson (the first Nova Award ever won posthumously) |
| 2011 | Head, ed. Doug Bell, Christina Lake | Claire Brialey | Dave Hicks |
| 2012 | Banana Wings, eds. Claire Brialey, Mark Plummer | Mark Plummer | (tie) Sue Mason and D West |
| 2013 | Banana Wings, eds. Claire Brialey, Mark Plummer | Mike Meara | D West |
| 2014 | Vibrator, ed. Graham Charnock | Christina Lake | D West |

== Committee awards ==
| Year | Best Fan |
|---|---|
| 1995 | Brian Burgess |
| 1996 | Bob Shaw |
| 1997 | Ken Slater |
| 2000 | Vernon Brown |
| 2003 | Ina Shorrock |
| 2004 | Ray Bradbury (Note: not the US author but the Birmingham SF Group fan who made the Nova Award trophies.) |
| 2007 | Peter Weston |
| 2013 | David A. Hardy |
