= The Glass Menagerie (film) =

The Glass Menagerie is a play by Tennessee Williams. It has been made into several films, including:

- The Glass Menagerie (1950 film), a 1950 film directed by Irving Rapper
- The Glass Menagerie (1966 film), a 1966 TV film that originally aired on CBS
- The Glass Menagerie (1973 film), a 1973 TV film that originally aired on ABC
- The Glass Menagerie (1987 film), a 1987 film directed by Paul Newman

== See also ==
- Akale, a 2004 Malayalam language version
- Here Without Me, a 2011 Iranian film adaptation
