= Victoria Poyser =

American artist

Victoria Poyser Lisi (born 1949) is an American artist who specializes in science fiction and fantasy artwork for book and magazine covers.

== Biography ==
Poyser acquired a BFA from Evergreen State College in Olympia, Washington and went on to become a Science Fiction Fantasy Artist after having been inspired by the World Fantasy Convention in 1979. She got her start making over a hundred book and magazine covers as well as the interior art for books in the 1980s, winning her two fan art Hugo Awards in 1981 and 1982.

After marrying her husband, Julius Lisi in 1987, Poyser started going by the name Victoria Lisi. She now works on collaborative children's book illustration as well as instructional painting books such as Vibrant Children's Portraits: Painting Beautiful Hair and Skin Tones with Oils by Victoria Poyser Lisi (2010). Most of her earlier works were in acrylics but now Lisi prefers to work with watercolor because she loves the “transparency, delicacy and unpredictability.”

After teaching Illustration at Western Connecticut State University for six years, Poyser currently lives in Colorado and teaches drawing, painting, watercolor and figure drawing at Aims Community College in Loveland, Colorado.

== Books and magazines ==
=== Cover art ===
- Double Exposure (1982) also appeared as: Die Doppelwelt [German] (1982)
- Eight Keys to Eden (1982)
- The Prisoner of Zhamanak (1982)
- Fantasy Mongers 7, 1983 (1983)
- The Bones of Zora (1983)
- Red as Blood, or Tales from the Sisters Grimmer (1983)
- Greyhaven: An Anthology of Fantasy (1983)
- Sung in Shadow (1983)
- Moon Called (1983)
- Stardance (1983)
- The Emperor of Eridanus (1983)
- Chaining the Lady (1984)
- Chanur's Venture (1984)
- Planet of Whispers (1984)
- The Pig Plantagenet (1984)
- Dicing With Dragons: An Introduction to Role-Playing Games (1984)
- Sword and Sorceress (1984)
- Ralestone Luck (1984)
- Creation Descending (1984)
- The Harper Hall of Pern (1984)
- Castle Crespin (1984)
- The Silver Horse (1984)
- Web of Darkness (1984)
- Returning Creation (1984)
- Wheel of Stars (1984)
- The Golden Sword (1984)
- The Second Kingdom (1984)
- Masters of Glass (1985)
- Traitor to the Living (1985)
- Wind from the Abyss (1985)
- The Gorgon and Other Beastly Tales (1985)
- Cluster (1985) with K. E. Johnson
- East of Midnight (1985)
- Mask of the Wizard (1985)
- The Carnelian Throne (1985)
- The Shattered World (1985)
- The Brotherhood of Diablo (1985)
- The Game of Empire (1985)
- Moonsinger's Friends (1985)
- Kopernikus 13 [German] (1985)
- Forerunner: The Second Venture (1985)
- The Third Book of Swords (1985) with Howard Chaykin
- House of Shadows (1985)
- Under Plum Lake (1985)
- World Tales (1985)
- Here Abide Monsters (1985)
- Split Second (1985)
- The Sinful Ones (1986)
- Interstellar Pig (1986)
- Harlot's Ruse (1986)
- The Dying Earth (1986)
- The Fallen Country (1986)
- Flight in Yiktor (1986)
- The Silver Mountain (1986)
- The Eyes of the Overworld (1986)
- The Adventures of Alyx (1986)
- Shadowkeep: Das dunkle Land [German] (1987)
- The Fisherman's Curse (1987)
- The Incorporated Knight (1987)
- Der verwunschene Ort: Eine Komödie der Entzauberung [German] (1987)
- Swimmers Beneath the Bright (1987)
- The Hidden Temple (1988)
- Four from the Witch World (1989)
- Tales of the Witch World 1 (1989)
- Tales of the Witch World 3 (1990) [only as Victoria Lisi]
- Dare to Go A-Hunting (1990)
- Science Fiction Chronicle, #133 October 1990 (1990)
- You're All Alone (1990)
- Science Fiction Chronicle,#143 September 1991 (1991) [only as Victoria Poyser-Lisi]
- Science Fiction Chronicle, #160 March 1993 (1993) [only as Victoria Poyser-Lisi]
- In Celebration of Lammas Night (1996)
- Science Fiction Chronicle, November 1997 (1997) [only as Victoria Poyser-Lisi]
- Marion Zimmer Bradley's Fantasy, Spring 1999 (1999) with Julius Lisi [only as Victoria Lisi]

=== Interior Art ===
- Showcase (Galaxy, May 1978) (1978)
- Weirdbook 13 (1978)
- Weirdbook 13 [2] (1978)
- "Prowler in the CIty at the Edge of Forever" (1978) [only as by Vicki Poyser]
- Janus, Vol. 4, #2-3 (1978)
- The Population Explosion at Lake Stover (1978)
- The Population Explosion at Lake Stover [2] (1978)
- Water into Wine: The Novels of C. J. Cherryh (1979)
- Weirdbook 14 (1979)
- 1978 Hugo Nominees (1979)
- Past World Conventions (Seacon '79 Programme Book) (1979)
- Random Factors: Letters (1979)
- In Silvered Shadows Are Born the Screams (1980)
- Who's Who on the Noreascon II Program (1980)
- The Fuzzy Papers (1980)
- The Fuzzy Papers [2] (1980)
- The Fuzzy Papers [3] (1980)
- The Fuzzy Papers [4] (1980)
- The Fuzzy Papers [5] (1980)
- The Fuzzy Papers [6] (1980)
- Dragon Lore (1980)
- Fantasy Newsletter No. 30 (1980)
- Fantasy Newsletter No. 32 (1981)
- How to Savor Seattle (1981)
- Fantasy Newsletter #36 (1981)
- Proteus (frontispiece) (1981)
- Fantasy Newsletter No. 43 (1981)
- Eight Keys to Eden (1982)
- Books (1982)
- Moon Called (1982)
- H. Warner Munn (1982)
- Sorceress in Her Study (1982)
- Fantasy Newsletter No. 59 (1983)
- Hoka! (1983)
- Joy in Mudville (1983)
- Science Fiction Jahrbuch 1984 [plate 13] [German] (1983)
- Science Fiction Jahrbuch 1984 [plate 14] [German] (1983)
- Web of Darkness (frontispiece) (1984)
- Weirdbook 19, Spring 1984 (back cover) (1984)
- Gallery (1984) with Don Maitz and Kevin Eugene Johnson and James C. Christensen and Ray Williams and Vincent Di Fate and Tarkas and Diane Dillonand Leo Dillon and Rowena Morrill and Carl Lundgren and Tom Kidd and George Barr and Paul Alexander and Don Maitz and Michael Whelan [only as by Don Maitz and Paul Alexander and George Barr and Tom Kidd and Carl Lundgrenand Rowena Morrill and Leo Dillon and Diane Dillon and Tarkas and Vincent Di Fate and Victoria Poyser and Ray Williams and James Christensen and Kevin Johnson and Michael Whelan and Don Maitz]
- The Day of the Dissonance (frontispiece) ( 1984) with Kevin Eugene Johnson
- House of Shadows (1985)
- Stephen R. Donaldson: Six Appreciations (1985)
- The Works of Victoria Poyser (1985)
- Victoria Poyser: An Appreciation (1985)
- Merchandising (1986)
- White Cloud's Dream (1994) [only as by Victoria Lisi]
