= Howard W. Johnston =

Howard W. Johnston (July 31, 1913 – April 27, 2005) served in Germany at the end of World War II in Europe with the Allied Control Council in the American Sector of Berlin. During this time, he was the principal founder of the Free University of Berlin.

Johnston received his Doctorate in Political Science from Columbia University in 1948 and served in various educational institutions including Anatolia College in Thessalonica, Greece, Iowa Wesleyan College in Mount Pleasant, Iowa, Fort Lewis College in Durango, Colorado. His last position before retirement in 1977 was as the Executive Director of the Associated Colleges of Central Kansas based in McPherson, Kansas. Johnston lived his last years in Wichita, Kansas, where he served in many volunteer capacities in local charities.
