= Howard Johnson (electrical engineer) =

American electrical engineer

Howard Johnson is an electrical engineer, known for his consulting work and commonly referenced books on the topic of signal integrity, especially for high speed electronic circuit design. He served as the chief technical editor for Fast Ethernet and Gigabit Ethernet standardisation, and was recognized by the IEEE as an "Outstanding Contributor" to the IEEE P802.3z Gigabit Task Force.

Johnson earned his Bachelor of Science in Electrical Engineering (1978), Masters of Electrical Engineering (1979), and PhD (1982) from Rice University. His dissertation was titled The design of DFT algorithms.

== Area of contribution ==
Johnson has significantly raised awareness of analog effects at work in high speed digital electronic systems.

In modern digital systems, it is common for digital designs to be subject to analog effects, even if they operate at a relatively low clock frequency. Circuits operating at lower clock rates can behave as high speed digital systems if there is sufficient high frequency content in the signal edges (when transitioning between digital logic levels) relative to the distance traveled across a printed circuit board. As a result of improvements in semiconductor process, faster edge rates of even "low technology" electronic components can be sufficient to make the system effectively high speed and thus subject to havoc caused by unanticipated analog effects.

A good example is his illustration of the matrix of rising edges that result from different combinations of skin-effect and dielectric loss which illustrates PCB design problems one encounters at microwave frequencies.

Johnson was also active in the development of two Institute of Electrical and Electronics Engineers (IEEE) standards that govern Ethernet, IEEE 802.3 Fast Ethernet and IEEE 802.3 Gigabit Ethernet.

== Books and publications ==
Johnson has written three books:

- High-Speed Digital Design: A Handbook of Black Magic (1993), ISBN 978-0133957242
- Fast Ethernet: Dawn of a New Network (1995), ISBN 978-0133526431
- High-Speed Signal Propagation: Advanced Black Magic (2003), ISBN 978-0130844088

Johnson also ran a monthly column at EDN (magazine) entitled Signal Integrity, which was later moved to a blog format.

He signed off with his last post "Seek inspiration" on 24 June 2013.
