= F. M. Busby =

American novelist (1921–2005)

- Born: Francis Marion Busby; March 11, 1921; Indianapolis, Indiana, United States
- Died: February 17, 2005 (aged 83); Seattle, Washington, United States
- Occupation: Science fiction writer
- Spouse: Elinor Doub (m. 1954)
- Writing career
- Years active: 1973–1996
- Website: fmbusby.com

Francis Marion Busby (March 11, 1921 – February 17, 2005) was an American science fiction writer. In 1960 he was a co-winner of the Hugo Award for Best Fanzine.

== Early life ==
Francis Busby was born in Indianapolis, the son of Francis Marion Busby and Clara Nye Busby. The family settled in Colfax, Washington, in 1931 and Busby attended high school there. He subsequently attended Washington State College until he joined the National Guard. He was subsequently discharged and returned to college. He did not remain long, however, and enlisted in the United States Army on July 23, 1943, at Spokane, Washington.

== Career ==
Busby served during World War II as part of the Alaska Communications System, assigned to Amchitka Island. At the end of the war he was discharged from the army and returned to college to graduate as an engineer. He subsequently returned to the Alaska Communications System to work in a civilian role based in Seattle.

In 1954 Busby married Elinor Doub, who was also a science fiction author. He had one daughter, Michele. Together with his wife and others he published a fan magazine named Cry of the Nameless which won the Hugo Award for Best Fanzine in 1960, making Doub the first woman to win a Hugo Award.

Busby continued to work for the Alaska Communications System until 1971, when the organization was sold to private industry and renamed RCA Alascom and he took early retirement from the company.

From 1974 to 1976 Busby was vice-president of Science Fiction and Fantasy Writers of America. At the age of 50 he became a freelance science-fiction author. He wrote 19 published novels and numerous short stories between 1973 and 1996.

Robert A. Heinlein in part dedicated his 1985 novel The Cat Who Walks Through Walls to Busby.

Busby ceased writing fiction some time after 1996, claiming this was due to the 1979 Thor Power Tool Co. v. Commissioner case's impact on the taxation of unsold books, although he wrote several novels after the case decision.

== Illness and death ==
In November 2004 Busby was diagnosed with severe intestinal problems. He went into the Swedish Medical Center, in Ballard, Seattle, for surgery and suffered complications. He underwent further surgery before being moved to Health and Rehabilitation of Seattle, where he died on February 17, 2005.

== Bibliography ==
=== Series ===
==== Demu ====
- 1. Cage a Man (1973)
- "The Learning of Eeshta" (1973) - short story; also appeared in collection Getting Home (1987)
- 2. The Proud Enemy (1975)
- 3. End of the Line (1980) - not published separately, but only in The Demu Trilogy
- The Demu Trilogy (omnibus) (1980) - includes all four titles (including first appearance of End of the Line)

==== Rissa Kerguelen and Bran Tregare ====
===== Rissa Kerguelen =====
- Rissa Kerguelen (1976, later reissued as Young Rissa and Rissa and Tregare)
- Young Rissa
- Rissa and Tregare
- The Long View (1976)
- Zelde M'Tana (1980)
- Renalle Kerguelen (2015, Kindle only)

===== Hulzein =====
- The Star Rebel (1984)
- Rebel's Quest (1984)
- The Alien Debt (1984)
- Rebel's Seed (1986)
- The Rebel Dynasty - Volume I (omnibus) (1987) - Contains Star Rebel and Rebel's Quest
- The Rebel Dynasty - Volume II (omnibus) (1988) - Contains The Alien Debt and Rebel's Seed

==== Slow Freight ====
- Slow Freight (1991)
- Arrow from Earth (1995)
- The Triad Worlds (1996)

=== Non-series novels ===
- All These Earths (1978); book version of the following linked stories:
  - "Pearsall's Return", If, July/Aug. 1973
  - "Search", Amazing, Dec. 1976
  - "Nobody Home", Amazing, July 1977
  - "Never So Lost…", Amazing, Oct. 1977
- The Breeds of Man (1988)
- The Singularity Project (1993)
- Islands of Tomorrow (1994)

=== Short-story collection ===
- Getting Home (1987) (for some stories, year of first appearance anywhere noted)

"A Gun for Grandfather"
"Of Mice and Otis"
"The Puiss of Krrlik"
"The Absence of Tom Leone"
"Proof"
"The Real World"
"Tell Me All About Yourself" (1973)
"Once Upon a Unicorn" (1973)
"Road Map"
"If This Is Winnetka, You Must Be Judy" (1974)
"Three Tinks on the House"
"The Learning of Eeshta" - Part of the Demu series, and also included in The Demu Trilogy (1980)
"I'm Going to Get You" (1974)
"2000½: A Spaced Oddity"
"Time of Need"
"Retroflex"
"Misconception"
"The Signing of Tulip"
"Advantage"
"Getting Home"

=== Other short stories ===
Busby wrote over 40 short stories, thus leaving over 20 still uncollected, including:

- "First Person Plural" (1980)
- "Backup System" (October 1981) appeared in Isaac Asimov's Science Fiction Magazine
- "Wrong Number" (December 1981) appeared in Isaac Asimov's Science Fiction Magazine

=== Anthologies containing stories by Busby ===
His work appeared in the following anthologies:

- Clarion III (1973) — "Road Map"
- The Best Science Fiction of the Year 3 (1974) – "Tell Me All About Yourself"
- Universe 5 (1975) – "If This Is Winnetka, You Must Be Judy"
- 100 Great Science Fiction Short Short Stories (1978)
- The Best of New Dimensions (1979)
- Universe 10 (1980) – "First Person Plural"
- Heroic Visions (1983) – "Before the Seas Came"
- 100 Great Fantasy Short Short Stories (1984)
