= Corflu =

Science fiction fanzine convention

Corflu is a science fiction fanzine convention held each spring, generally in North America but also five times in England and once in Northern Ireland. It is named after a slang term for the "correction fluid" used in mimeograph printing, a common way to produce fanzines before the arrival of low-cost photocopying and online fanzines. Each Corflu is organized by a different regional group, selected at the previous year's gathering. Previous Corflus have been held at:

- 1984: Berkeley, California
- 1985: Napa, California
- 1986: Tysons Corner, Virginia
- 1987: Cincinnati
- 1988: Seattle
- 1989: Minneapolis
- 1990: New York City
- 1991: El Paso
- 1992: Los Angeles
- 1993: Madison, Wisconsin
- 1994: Crystal City, Virginia
- 1995: Las Vegas
- 1996: Nashville, Tennessee
- 1997: Walnut Creek, California
- 1998: Leeds, England - the first Corflu held outside North America
- 1999: Panama City, Florida
- 2000: Seattle
- 2001: Boston
- 2002: Annapolis
- 2003: Madison, Wisconsin
- 2004: Las Vegas
- 2005: San Francisco
- 2006: Toronto, Ontario, Canada
- 2007: Austin, Texas
- 2008: Las Vegas
- 2009: Seattle
- 2010: Winchester, England
- 2011: Sunnyvale, California
- 2012: Las Vegas
- 2013 : Portland, Oregon
- 2014 : Richmond, Virginia
- 2015 : Newcastle-upon-Tyne, England
- 2016: Chicago
- 2017: Woodland Hills, California
- 2018: Toronto, Ontario, Canada
- 2019: Rockville, Maryland
- 2020: College Station, Texas
- 2021: Bristol, England
- 2022: Vancouver, British Columbia, Canada
- 2023: Belfast, Northern Ireland
- 2024: Las Vegas
- 2025: Newbury, England
- 2026: Santa Rosa, California

The venue for the 2027 Corflu was selected at the 2026 Corflu as Vancouver, British Columbia, Canada

Corflu is a small, informal convention with a single track of programming. Corflu's traditions include choosing the Guest of Honor randomly from the attendees and electing past presidents of the Fan Writers of America (which never has a current president). The Fan Activity Achievement Awards (FAAns) are presented annually at Corflu, and since 2010 a Lifetime Achievement Award has also been presented.

== See also ==
- Ditto (convention)
