= Hugo Award for Best Fan Artist =

Annual award for science fiction or fantasy

- Awarded for: The best fan artist of works devoted primarily to science fiction or fantasy
- Presented by: World Science Fiction Society
- First award: 1967
- Most recent winner: Yuumei
- Website: thehugoawards.org

The Hugo Award for Best Fan Artist is given each year for artists of works related to science fiction or fantasy which appeared in low- or non-paying publications such as semiprozines or fanzines. A Hugo Award for professional artists is also given. The Hugo Awards have been described as "a fine showcase for speculative fiction" and "the best known literary award for science fiction writing".

The fan award was first presented in 1967 and has been awarded annually. Between 1996 and 2025, Retrospective Hugo Awards or "Retro-Hugos" were available for works published 50, 75, or 100 years prior. Retro-Hugos could only be awarded for years after 1939 in which no awards were originally given. Retro-Hugo awards were awarded for 1939, 1941, 1943–1946, 1951, and 1954, although only the 1946 and 1951 Retro-Hugos received sufficient nominations for the Fan Artist Hugo to make the ballot.

Hugo Award nominees and winners are chosen by supporting or attending members of the annual World Science Fiction Convention, or Worldcon, and the presentation evening constitutes its central event. The selection process is defined in the World Science Fiction Society Constitution as instant-runoff voting with six finalists, except in the case of a tie. The works on the ballot are those six most-nominated by members that year, with no limit on the number of works that can be nominated. Initial nominations are made by members in January through March, while voting on the ballot of six finalists is performed roughly in April through July, subject to change depending on when that year's Worldcon is held. Prior to 2017, the final ballot was five works; it was changed that year to six, with each initial nominator limited to five nominations. Worldcons are generally held near Labor Day and in a different city around the world each year.

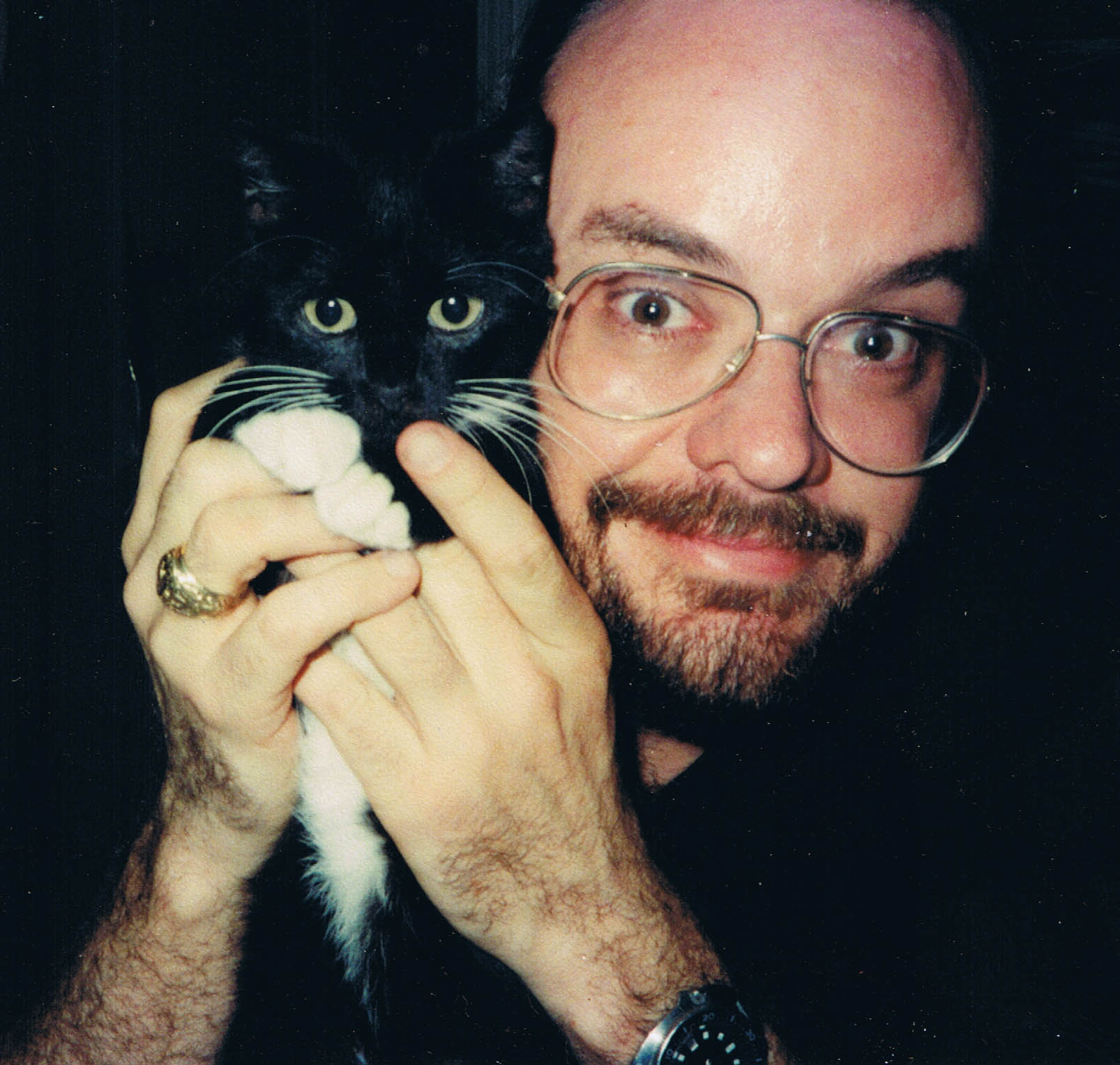
Brad W. Foster has received the largest number of awards, with 8 wins out of 27 final ballot nominations.

During the 62 nomination years, 88 artists have been finalists; 35 of these have won, including co-winners and Retro Hugos. Brad W. Foster has received the largest number of awards, with 8 wins out of 27 final ballot nominations. William Rotsler and Tim Kirk have won five awards, from 23 and 8 nominations respectively. The only other artists to win more than twice are Teddy Harvia, with 4 out of 20 nominations, Alexis A. Gilliland, with 4 out of 8, and Frank Wu, also with 4 out of 8. The artist with the most nominations without winning was Taral Wayne, at 12 nominations.

== Winners and finalists ==
In the following tables, the years correspond to the date of the ceremony. Artists are eligible based on their work of the previous calendar year. Entries with a yellow background and an asterisk (*) next to the artist's name have won the award; those with a gray background are the finalists on the short-list.

* Winners and joint winners

Winners and finalists
Year	Artist	Ref.
1967	Jack Gaughan*	
1967	George Barr	
1967	Jeff Jones	
1967	Steve Stiles	
1967	Arthur "ATom" Thomson	
1968	George Barr*	
1968	Johnny Chambers	
1968	Steve Stiles	
1968	Arthur "ATom" Thomson	
1968	Bjo Trimble	
1969	Vaughn Bodé*	
1969	George Barr	
1969	Tim Kirk	
1969	Doug Lovenstein	
1969	William Rotsler	
1970	Tim Kirk*	
1970	Alicia Austin	
1970	George Barr	
1970	Stephen Fabian	
1970	William Rotsler	
1971	Alicia Austin*	
1971	Stephen Fabian	
1971	Mike Gilbert	
1971	Tim Kirk	
1971	William Rotsler	
1972	Tim Kirk*	
1972	Alicia Austin	
1972	Grant Canfield	
1972	Wendy Fletcher	
1972	William Rotsler	
1973	Tim Kirk*	
1973	Grant Canfield	
1973	William Rotsler	
1973	James Shull	
1973	Arthur "ATom" Thomson	
1974	Tim Kirk*	
1974	Alicia Austin	
1974	Grant Canfield	
1974	William Rotsler	
1974	Arthur "ATom" Thomson	
1975	William Rotsler*	
1975	George Barr	
1975	Grant Canfield	
1975	James Shull	
1976	Tim Kirk*	
1976	Grant Canfield	
1976	Phil Foglio	
1976	William Rotsler	
1976	James Shull	
1977	Phil Foglio*	
1977	Grant Canfield	
1977	Tim Kirk	
1977	William Rotsler	
1977	James Shull	
1978	Phil Foglio*	
1978	Grant Canfield	
1978	Alexis A. Gilliland	
1978	Jeanne Gomoll	
1978	James Shull	
1979	William Rotsler*	
1979	Jim Barker	
1979	Harry Bell	
1979	Alexis A. Gilliland	
1979	Stuart Shiffman	
1980	Alexis A. Gilliland*	
1980	Jeanne Gomoll	
1980	Joan Hanke-Woods	
1980	Victoria Poyser	
1980	William Rotsler	
1980	Stuart Shiffman	
1981	Victoria Poyser*	
1981	Alexis A. Gilliland	
1981	Joan Hanke-Woods	
1981	William Rotsler	
1981	Stuart Shiffman	
1982	Victoria Poyser*	
1982	Alexis A. Gilliland	
1982	Joan Hanke-Woods	
1982	William Rotsler	
1982	Stuart Shiffman	
1983	Alexis A. Gilliland*	
1983	Joan Hanke-Woods	
1983	William Rotsler	
1983	Stuart Shiffman	
1983	Dan Steffan	
1984	Alexis A. Gilliland*	
1984	Brad W. Foster	
1984	Joan Hanke-Woods	
1984	William Rotsler	
1984	Stuart Shiffman	
1985	Alexis A. Gilliland*	
1985	Brad W. Foster	
1985	Steven Fox	
1985	Joan Hanke-Woods	
1985	William Rotsler	
1985	Stuart Shiffman	
1986	Joan Hanke-Woods*	
1986	Brad W. Foster	
1986	Steven Fox	
1986	William Rotsler	
1986	Stuart Shiffman	
1987	Brad W. Foster*	
1987	Steven Fox	
1987	Stuart Shiffman	
1987	Arthur "ATom" Thomson	
1987	Taral Wayne	
1988	Brad W. Foster*	
1988	Steven Fox	
1988	Teddy Harvia	
1988	Merle Insinga	
1988	Taral Wayne	
1988	Diana Gallagher Wu	
1989	Brad W. Foster*	
1989	Diana Gallagher Wu*	
1989	Teddy Harvia	
1989	Merle Insinga	
1989	Stuart Shiffman	
1989	Taral Wayne	
1990	Stuart Shiffman*	
1990	Steven Fox	
1990	Teddy Harvia	
1990	Merle Insinga	
1990	Joe Mayhew	
1990	Taral Wayne	
1991	Teddy Harvia*	
1991	Merle Insinga	
1991	Peggy Ranson	
1991	Stuart Shiffman	
1991	Diana Harlan Stein	
1992	Brad W. Foster*	
1992	Teddy Harvia	
1992	Peggy Ranson	
1992	Stuart Shiffman	
1992	Diana Harlan Stein	
1993	Peggy Ranson*	
1993	Teddy Harvia	
1993	Merle Insinga	
1993	Linda Michaels	
1993	Stuart Shiffman	
1993	Diana Harlan Stein	
1994	Brad W. Foster*	
1994	Teddy Harvia	
1994	Linda Michaels	
1994	Peggy Ranson	
1994	William Rotsler	
1994	Stuart Shiffman	
1995	Teddy Harvia*	
1995	Brad W. Foster	
1995	Linda Michaels	
1995	Peggy Ranson	
1995	William Rotsler	
1996	William Rotsler*	
1996	Ian Gunn	
1996	Teddy Harvia	
1996	Joe Mayhew	
1996	Peggy Ranson	
1997	William Rotsler*	
1997	Ian Gunn	
1997	Joe Mayhew	
1997	Peggy Ranson	
1997	Sherlock	
1998	Joe Mayhew*	
1998	Brad W. Foster	
1998	Ian Gunn	
1998	Teddy Harvia	
1998	Peggy Ranson	
1999	Ian Gunn*	
1999	Freddie Baer	
1999	Brad W. Foster	
1999	Teddy Harvia	
1999	Joe Mayhew	
1999	D. West	
2000	Joe Mayhew*	
2000	Freddie Baer	
2000	Brad W. Foster	
2000	Teddy Harvia	
2000	Taral Wayne	
2001	Teddy Harvia*	
2001	Sheryl Birkhead	
2001	Brad W. Foster	
2001	Sue Mason	
2001	Taral Wayne	
2002	Teddy Harvia*	
2002	Sheryl Birkhead	
2002	Brad W. Foster	
2002	Sue Mason	
2002	Frank Wu	
2003	Sue Mason*	
2003	Brad W. Foster	
2003	Teddy Harvia	
2003	Steve Stiles	
2003	Frank Wu	
2004	Frank Wu*	
2004	Brad W. Foster	
2004	Teddy Harvia	
2004	Sue Mason	
2004	Steve Stiles	
2005	Sue Mason*	
2005	Brad W. Foster	
2005	Teddy Harvia	
2005	Steve Stiles	
2005	Frank Wu	
2006	Frank Wu*	
2006	Brad W. Foster	
2006	Teddy Harvia	
2006	Sue Mason	
2006	Steve Stiles	
2007	Frank Wu*	
2007	Brad W. Foster	
2007	Teddy Harvia	
2007	Sue Mason	
2007	Steve Stiles	
2008	Brad W. Foster*	
2008	Teddy Harvia	
2008	Sue Mason	
2008	Steve Stiles	
2008	Taral Wayne	
2009	Frank Wu*	
2009	Alan F. Beck	
2009	Brad W. Foster	
2009	Sue Mason	
2009	Taral Wayne	
2010	Brad W. Foster*	
2010	Dave Howell	
2010	Sue Mason	
2010	Steve Stiles	
2010	Taral Wayne	
2011	Brad W. Foster*	
2011	Randall Munroe	
2011	Maurine Starkey	
2011	Steve Stiles	
2011	Taral Wayne	
2012	Maurine Starkey*	
2012	Brad W. Foster	
2012	Randall Munroe	
2012	Spring Schoenhuth	
2012	Steve Stiles	
2012	Taral Wayne	
2013	Galen Dara*	
2013	Brad W. Foster	
2013	Spring Schoenhuth	
2013	Maurine Starkey	
2013	Steve Stiles	
2014	Sarah Webb*	
2014	Brad W. Foster	
2014	Mandie Manzano	
2014	Spring Schoenhuth	
2014	Steve Stiles	
2015	Elizabeth Leggett*	
2015	Ninni Aalto	
2015	Brad W. Foster	
2015	Spring Schoenhuth	
2015	Steve Stiles	
2016	Steve Stiles*	
2016	Matthew Callahan	
2016	Christian Quinot	
2016	disse86	
2016	Kukuruyo	
2017	Elizabeth Leggett*	
2017	Ninni Aalto	
2017	Vesa Lehtimäki	
2017	Mia Sereno	
2017	Spring Schoenhuth	
2017	Steve Stiles	
2018	Geneva Benton*	
2018	Grace P. Fong	
2018	Maya Hahto	
2018	Mia Sereno (as Likhain)	
2018	Spring Schoenhuth	
2018	Steve Stiles	
2019	Mia Sereno (as Likhain)*	
2019	Sara Felix	
2019	Grace P. Fong	
2019	Meg Frank	
2019	Ariela Housman	
2019	Spring Schoenhuth	
2020	Elise Matthesen*	
2020	Iain J. Clark	
2020	Sara Felix	
2020	Grace P. Fong	
2020	Meg Frank	
2020	Ariela Housman	
2021	Sara Felix*	
2021	Iain J. Clark	
2021	Cyan Daly	
2021	Grace P. Fong	
2021	Maya Hahto	
2021	Laya Rose	
2022	Lee Moyer*	
2022	Iain J. Clark	
2022	Lorelei Esther	
2022	Sara Felix	
2022	Ariela Housman	
2022	Nilah Magruder	
2023	Richard Man*	
2023	Iain J. Clark	
2023	Laya Rose	
2023	Alison Scott	
2023	España Sheriff	
2023	Orion Smith	
2024	Laya Rose*	
2024	Iain J. Clark	
2024	Sara Felix	
2024	Dante Luiz	
2024	Alison Scott	
2024	España Sheriff	
2025	Sara Felix*	
2025	Iain J. Clark	
2025	Meg Frank	
2025	Michelle Morrell	
2025	Alison Scott	
2025	España Sheriff	
2026	Yuumei *	
2026	Sara Felix	
2026	Terri Ash	
2026	Geneva Bowers	
2026	Richard Man	
2026	España Sheriff	

=== Retro Hugos ===
Between the 1996 Worldcon and 2025 Worldcon, the World Science Fiction Society had the concept of "Retro-Hugos", in which the Hugo award could be retroactively awarded for 50, 75, or 100 years prior. Retro-Hugos could only be awarded for years after 1939 (the year of the first Worldcon) in which no Hugos were originally awarded. Retro Hugos were awarded eight times, for 1939, 1941, 1943–1946, 1951, and 1954. Only the 1946 and 1951 Retro Hugos received enough nominations for the Fan Artist Hugo to make the ballot.

Retro Hugo winners and finalists
Year	Year awarded	Artist	Ref.
1946	1996	William Rotsler*	
1946	1996	Joe Gibson	
1946	1996	Lou Goldstone, Jr.	
1946	1996	Alva Rogers	
1946	1996	Jack Wiedenbeck	
1951	2001	Jack Gaughan*	
1951	2001	Lee Hoffman	
1951	2001	Ray Nelson	
1951	2001	William Rotsler	
1951	2001	James White	
