= Howard David Johnson =

American painter

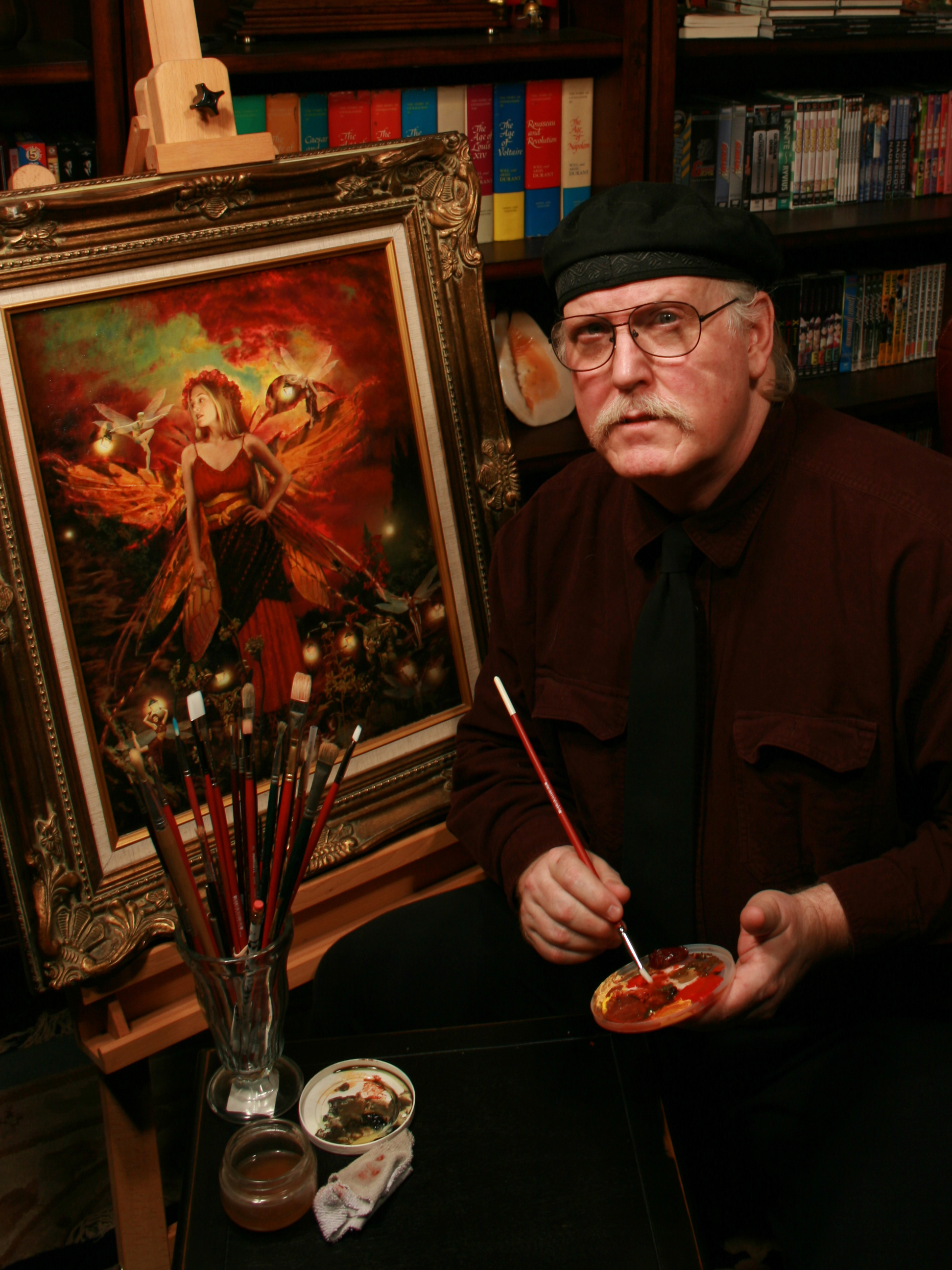
- publicity photo
- Born: 2 September 1954 (age 72); Mötsch, West Germany
- Known for: Painting, Photography
- Movement: Photorealism, Science Fiction / Fantasy
- Website: Official website

Howard David Johnson (born 2 September 1954) is an American photorealist illustrator (drawer, painter, digital artist) of portrait, historical, mythological/religious art. He works in a variety of mixed media ranging from oil on canvas to digital media. He combines traditional style and methods with digital techniques.

== Early life ==
Born in Mötsch (a district of Bitburg), West Germany, the son of an American Air Force officer stationed at Bitburg Air Base.

He was trained at the University of Texas at Austin College of Fine Art and began his career working as a scientific illustrator for their School of Paleontology reconstructing dinosaurs in 1974.

== Career ==
Johnson has illustrated for books, magazines, games, television programs and computer software. Clients include the National Geographic Society, Oxford University Press, Universal, Paramount and Disney Studios, PBS television, The History Channel, ABC TV, CBS TV, Warner Home Video, Adobe Photoshop, Doubleday, and Penguin.

His art has been licensed for coins and statues by The Bradford Exchange.

== Notes ==
TÁIN BÓ CÚAILNGE by Easton Press Táin Bó Cúailnge Leather Book
