= Science fiction fanzine =

Fanzine on science fiction

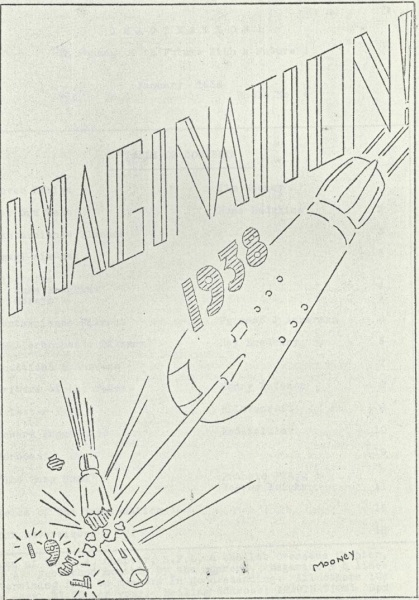
Cover of Imagination, a fanzine published by Forrest J. Ackerman, January 1938, drawn by Jim Mooney

A science fiction fanzine is an amateur or semi-professional magazine published by members of science fiction fandom, from the 1930s to the present day. They were one of the earliest forms of fanzine, within which the term "fanzine" was coined, and at one time constituted the primary type of science fictional fannish activity ("fanac").

== Origins and history ==
The first science fiction fanzine, The Comet, was published in 1930 by the Science Correspondence Club in Chicago. The term "fanzine" was coined by Russ Chauvenet in the October 1940 issue of his fanzine Detours. "Fanzines" were distinguished from "prozines", that is, all professional magazines. Prior to that, the fan publications were known as "fanmags" or "letterzines".

Traditionally, science-fiction fanzines were (and many still are) available for "the usual", meaning that a sample issue will be mailed on request; to receive further issues, a reader sends a "letter of comment" (LoC) about the fanzine to the editor. The LoC might be published in the next issue: some fanzines consisted almost exclusively of letter columns, where discussions were conducted in much the same way as they are in internet newsgroups and mailing lists, though at a relatively slow pace.

Since 1955, the annual Worldcon has awarded Hugo Awards for Best Fanzine; awards for Best Fan Writer and Best Fan Artist were added in 1967 and have continued since then.

== Semiprozines ==
During the 1970s and 1980s, some fanzines—especially sercon (serious and constructive) zines devoted to science fiction and fantasy criticism, and newszines such as Locus—became more professional journals, produced by desktop publishing programs and offset printing. These new magazines were labeled "semiprozines", and were eventually sold rather than traded, and paid their contributors. Some semiprozines publish original fiction. The Hugo Awards recognized semiprozines as a separate category from fanzines in 1984 after Locus won the award for best fanzine several years running (See Hugo Award for Best Semiprozine). Well-known semiprozines include Locus, Ansible, The New York Review of Science Fiction, and Interzone.

== APAs ==
Amateur press associations (APAs) publish fanzines made up of the contributions of the individual members collected into an assemblage or bundle called an apazine.

The first science fiction APA was the Fantasy Amateur Press Association (FAPA) formed by a group of science fiction fans in 1937. Some APAs are still active as hardcopy publications, and some are published as virtual "e-zines", distributed on the internet.

== Other types of fanzines ==
The term "fanzine" is also used to refer to fan-created magazines concerning other topics: the earliest rock-and-roll fanzines were edited by science fiction fans. A significant part of modern computer/Web/Internet slang, abbreviations, etc. is derived from the jargon of the fanzine fans. See fanzine, fanspeak.

The fanzine movement is now well represented on the Web; see webzine.

== Conventions ==
Fanzine readers and producers naturally gather at science fiction conventions, but there are also small conventions dedicated to fanzines. The first fanzine-only annual convention was Autoclave, held by a Detroit-based fan group for several years in the 1970s. In 1984, the first Corflu was held in Berkeley, California. A second convention, Ditto, started in Toronto in 1988. Both of these conventions continue to take place each year.

== See also ==
- Fanspeak
