= William Rotsler =

American writer (1926–1997)

- Born: Charles William Rotsler; July 3, 1926; Los Angeles, U.S.
- Died: October 18, 1997 (aged 71)
- Other name: Bill Rotsler
- Awards: Hugo Award for Best Fan Artist (1975, 1979, 1996, and 1997); Inkpot Award (1978)
- Website: www.williamcharlesrotsler.com

Charles William Rotsler (July 3, 1926 – October 18, 1997) was an American artist, cartoonist, pornographer and science fiction author. Rotsler was a four-time Hugo Award winner and one-time Nebula Award nominee.

Rotsler's papers including dozens of matted color drawings, unpublished manuscripts and sketchbooks of original artwork are part of the Eaton Collection at University of California, Riverside.

== Career ==
=== Pornography ===
From 1958, Rotsler was involved in the pornography industry, first as a stills photographer on the set of adult films, and later as a film director and actor.

In 1966, Rotsler created Adam Film Quarterly, later called Adam Film World, as a sibling magazine to Knight Publishing's Adam magazine. Adam Film Quarterly featured female nudity but only simulated sex acts. The magazine also provided commentary about simulated pornography, which other media outlets would not cover.

As a byproduct of his coverage of sexploitation films, Rostler earned a reputation as writer—creating novelizations of sexploitation films for his magazine—and as a pornographic photographer.

Because of Adam Film Quarterly's success, Rotsler began using pseudonyms for his appearances including "Shannon Carse", "Cord Heller", "Clay McCord", and "Merrill Dakota". He even interviewed himself as these characters in Adam Film Quarterly. Rotsler said, "On the 'lesser' productions, I'd direct as Shannon Carse and if I acted, I'd be Barney Boone. If I acted in a Rotsler-directed film, I'd be Shannon Carse."

Rotsler wrote, directed, or acted in some two dozen pornographic films during his career with Boxoffice International Pictures. In the 1980s, he was cameraman for the Hollywood segments for the French series Destination Series, hosted by Bill Warren. Rotsler occasionally appeared on camera. He also wrote Contemporary Erotic Cinema in 1973, published by Ballantine and Penthouse, about pornographic movies from an aesthetic point of view.

=== Science fiction ===
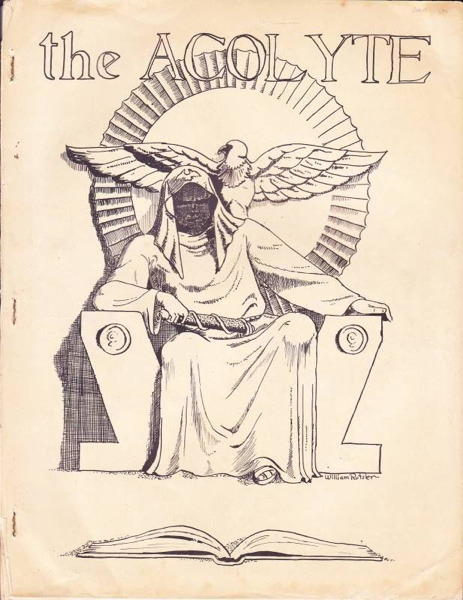
Among Rotsler's earliest fan art was the cover illustration to The Acolyte 14, 1946

Rotsler was a popular cartoonist for a large number of science fiction fanzines. His first cover illustration appeared on National Fantasy Fan, vol. 7, issue 2, published in 1948.

In 1969, Harlan Ellison encouraged Rotsler to write science fiction stories.

He won the Hugo Award for Best Fan Artist four times: 1975, 1979, 1996, and 1997. He also won a "retro-Hugo" for his work in 1946 and was runner-up for 1951. Rotsler was a well-known attendee at West Coast science fiction conventions where he would give away his illustrations. He is also the author of "Rotsler's Rules for Costuming", which address the cosplay often found at these conventions. He quipped that "people are making rules for themselves and always finding loop-holes." Through his illustrations Rotsler also helped perpetuate the image of science fiction fans wearing propeller beanies.

As an author, Rotsler's best-known story, "Patron of the Arts" (1972), was a finalist for the Hugo and Nebula award for best novelette; it was expanded to novel length in 1974 under the same title. In 1982, Rotsler published several Star Trek ties-ins for children for Wanderer Books. He is credited with the first use of "Nyota" as Uhura's first name. Rotsler was the source of the title of Harlan Ellison's short story "I Have No Mouth, and I Must Scream" (1967). This was adopted, with permission, from a caption of a Rotsler cartoon of a rag doll with no mouth.

The Rotsler Award, named for Rotsler, is given annually at Loscon by the Southern California Institute for Fan Interests to recognize "lifetime work of outstanding fan artists." The award comes with a US$300 honorarium.

== Filmography ==
Title	Year	Role	Notes	Source
Agony of Love	1966	The Beatnik (credited as Shannon Carse)	director, writer, and producer	
The Girl with the Hungry Eyes	1967	Brian (credited as Shannon Carse)	director, writer, and producer	
Mantis in Lace	1968		director	
The Enormous Midnight	1968		director	
Shannon's Women	1969	Shannon	credited as Shannon Carse	
House of Pain and Pleasure	1969		director	
Street of a Thousand Pleasures	1972		director	

== Bibliography ==
- Contemporary Erotic Cinema (1973)
- Patron of the Arts (1974), expanded from a 1972 novelette of the same name.
- To the Land of the Electric Angel (1976)
- Futureworld (1976), novelization as by John Ryder Hall
- Visions from Nowhere (1976), writing as William Arrow, a novelization of the animated series Return to the Planet of the Apes.
- Man, the Hunted Animal (1976), writing as William Arrow, a novelization of the animated series Return to the Planet of the Apes.
- Sinbad and the Eye of the Tiger (1977), novelization as by John Ryder Hall
- Zandra (1978)
- The Far Frontier (1980)
- Shiva Descending (1980), with Gregory Benford
- Blackhawk (1982), based on the DC comic series of the same name.
- Vice Squad (1982), novelization
- The Hidden Worlds of Zandra (1983)
- Science Fictionisms (1995)

=== Marvel Novel Series (1979) ===
No.	Title	Date	ISBN
6	And Call My Killer … Modok!	May 1979	0-671-82089-3
7	Nightmare!	June 1979	0-671-82088-5

Rotsler and his collaborator, Sharman DiVono, also enjoyed a humorous appearance in Daredevil (Marvel Comics series) #142 and #143 (1977). "Bill" Rotsler and his girlfriend Sharman, dressed as Tarzan and Jane, are in Rotsler's Manhattan rooftop recreation of an African jungle when they are attacked by the super-villains Cobra and Mr. Hyde, who want to steal his rare book collection.

=== Tom Swift (1981–1982) ===
Co-author Sharman DiVono and Rotsler were jointly credited as Victor Appleton.

No.			
1	The City in the Stars	July 1981	0-671-41120-9
2	Terror on the Moons of Jupiter	July 1981	0-671-41182-9
3	The Alien Probe	July 1981	0-671-42538-2
4	War in Outer Space	July 1981	0-671-42539-0
5	The Astral Fortress	January 1982	0-671-43369-5
6	The Rescue Mission	February 1982	0-671-43370-9

=== Star Trek tie-ins (1982–1984) ===
==== The Wrath of Khan (1982) ====
Edited and co-written by Wendy Barish, who is not credited.

- Star Trek II: Biographies (reference). First reference to Uhura's forename, Nyota. The remaining contents are not canon.
- Distress Call (gamebook)
- Star Trek II: Short Stories (anthology)

==== The Search for Spock (1984) ====
- Star Trek III: Short Stories (anthology)
- The Vulcan Treasure (gamebook)
