= Toni Weisskopf =

American editor and science fiction writer

- Weisskopf at Dragon Con in 2026
- Born: Antonia Katherine Flora Weisskopf; December 12, 1965 (age 60); Waltham, Massachusetts
- Occupations: Editor; Publisher
- Spouse: Hank Reinhardt (d. 2007)
- Partner: Jim Baen (d. 2006)
- Children: Katherine
- Writing career
- Pen name: T. K. F. Weisskopf
- Genres: Science fiction; Fantasy; Horror

Toni Weisskopf (born Antonia Katherine Flora Weisskopf on December 12, 1965) is an American science fiction editor and the publisher of Baen Books. She has been nominated four times for a Hugo Award. She has won the Phoenix Award, the Rebel Award, and the Neffy Award for best editor. She uses the nom de plume T. K. F. Weisskopf as an anthology editor.

== Biography ==
Weisskopf was born on December 12, 1965, in Waltham, Massachusetts. Her family moved to Brooklyn when she was three years old, and then to Huntsville, Alabama, when she was twelve. She graduated from Oberlin College in 1987 with a degree in anthropology.

She has one daughter, Katherine, with Jim Baen. Following Baen's death, she married Hank Reinhardt, who died on October 30, 2007.

=== Career ===
Upon graduation in 1987, she was employed by Baen Books as an editorial assistant. She worked various jobs there until becoming executive editor, a job she had until the death of founder Jim Baen in 2006. Since that time, she has been the publisher at Baen. She has edited a number of Baen anthologies under the name T. K. F. Weisskopf.

She won the Phoenix Award in 1994 for excellence in science fiction, as well as the tongue-in-cheek Rubble Award, an anti-award given out annually to a fan or professional who has "done something humorously ignominious". Her first publication, a vampire anthology titled Tomorrow Sucks, was co-edited with Greg Cox and published by Baen in 1994. A follow-up anthology, Tomorrow Bites, was released in 1995.

Weisskopf received the Rebel Award in 2000 for "lifetime achievement in Southern Science Fiction Fandom". Her next set of anthologies, Cosmic Tales: Adventures in Sol System (2004) and Cosmic Tales II: Adventures in Far Futures (2005) contained science fiction adventure stories. Transhuman, an anthology co-edited with Mark L. Van Name, was published in February 2008. Weisskopf was the editor guest of honor for the 2010 North American Science Fiction Convention, ReConStruction. She was nominated for a Hugo Award four times in the Best Professional Editor category: in 2013, 2014, 2015, and 2016. She was awarded the Neffy Award as Best Editor in 2015. In February 2015 Toni was an Editor Guest of Honor and Keynote Speaker at the 33rd annual Life, the Universe, & Everything professional science fiction and fantasy arts symposium.

In 2020, she co-edited with Christopher Woods an anthology, Give Me LibertyCon, that established a scholarship in honor of Timothy Bolgeo, founder of LibertyCon, an annual science fiction convention in Chattanooga, Tennessee. She was announced in July 2020 as the Editor Guest of Honor for Discon III, the 79th World Science Fiction Convention. Due to controversies over the online community Baen's Bar maintained by Baen Books, she was removed as Editor Guest of Honor on February 19, 2021.

== Bibliography ==
Weisskopf has edited the following anthologies as T. K. F. Weisskopf:

- Tomorrow Sucks with Greg Cox (October 1994, Baen, ISBN 0-671-87626-0)
- Tomorrow Bites with Greg Cox (October 1995, Baen, ISBN 0-671-87691-0)
- Cosmic Tales: Adventures in Sol System (June 2004, Baen, ISBN 0-7434-8832-6)
- Cosmic Tales II: Adventures in Far Futures (February 2005, Baen, ISBN 0-7434-9887-9)
- Transhuman with Mark L. Van Name (February 2008, Baen, ISBN 978-1-4165-5523-0)
- Give Me LibertyCon with Christopher Woods (June 2020, Baen, ISBN 9781982124649)
- Onward, Libertycon! with Christopher Woods (June 2022 Woods Publishing, ISBN 978-1946419477)

== Awards and recognition ==
Weisskopf has received the following awards and recognition:

Year	Organization	Award title, Category	Work	Result	Refs
1994	DeepSouthCon	Phoenix Award; Excellence in Science Fiction	n/a	Won	
2000	DeepSouthCon	Rebel Award, Lifetime Achievement in Southern Science Fiction Fandom	n/a	Won	
2013	Worldcon	Hugo Award, Best Professional Editor	n/a	Nominated	
2014	Worldcon	Hugo Award, Best Professional Editor	n/a	Nominated	
2015	Worldcon	Hugo Award, Best Professional Editor	n/a	Nominated	
2015	National Fantasy Fan Federation	Neffy Award, Best Editor	n/a	Won	
2016	Worldcon	Hugo Award, Best Professional Editor	n/a	Nominated	
2016	SFWA	Kate Wilhelm Solstice Award	n/a	Won	
