= J.M. Frey =

Canadian science fiction and fantasy author

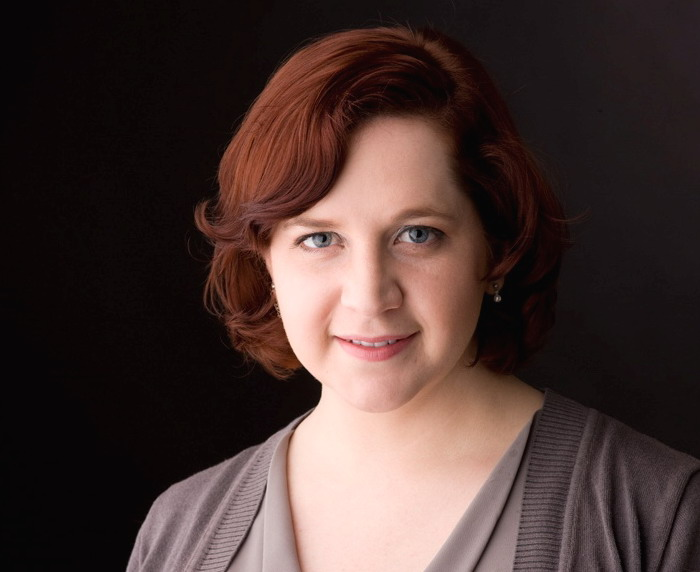
- Born: Jessica Marie Frey; Guelph, Ontario, Canada
- Education: Brock University, St. Catharines; Ryerson University (now Toronto Metropolitan University), Toronto; York University, Toronto
- Occupations: Novelist, Voice actor
- Writing career
- Period: 2011 to present
- Genres: Speculative fiction, Science fiction, Queer Romance, Urban Fantasy, Steampunk, Romance
- Notable works: Triptych, The Untold Tale (The Accidental Turn Series), The Skylark's Song (The Skylark's Saga), The Maddening Science, Lips Like Ice (as Peggy Barnett), Time and Tide, Nine-Tenths
- Notable awards: "Triptych" named best Science Fiction / Fantasy book at the San Francisco Book Festival (May 2012); "Triptych" nominated in the Bisexual and LGBT SF/F categories of the Lambda Literary Awards (March 2012); "Triptych" nominated in the 2nd Annual CBC Bookies awards (March 2012); "Triptych" named one of the Best Overlooked Books of 2011 by The Advocate (Dec-Jan 2011-2012); "Triptych" named the #3 Best Book of 2011 in the Science Fiction/Fantasy/Horror category by Publishers Weekly & Genreville’s Rose Fox. (2012); "The Woman Who Fell Through Time" (republished as "Time and Tide" in 2024), winner of a 2019 WATTY AWARD for Historical Fiction and A-Rating from BookLife; "Time and Tide" named to the New York Times Best Romance Books of 2024 list.
- Website: jmfrey.net

Jessica Marie Frey /ˈfraɪ/ FRY is a Canadian science fiction and fantasy author. While she is best known for her debut novel Triptych, Frey's work encompasses poetry, academic and magazine articles, screenplays, and short stories. Frey calls herself a "professional geek".

Frey has appeared at Toronto-area science fiction conventions and is involved with charity and community fan groups and initiatives. She regularly appears on radio shows, television talk shows, and podcasts discussing fandom and genre works.

== Biography ==
Frey began writing at the age of eleven. She began by writing fanfiction, which she calls her "apprenticeship to the fandom community", which led her to write original stories at the age of eighteen. Frey's academic and creative writing focused primarily on Japanese mythology, the Classics, and traditional Japanese theatre. She began her first novel while at Brock University, which has not yet been published, and first began to seriously study creative writing there.

After earning her Bachelor of Arts in Dramatic Literature (honors) in 2005, Frey lived in Fukuoka, Japan for two years, where she taught English as a Japanese Exchange Teacher, and worked on several other to-date-unpublished manuscripts. In 2007, Frey returned to Canada to attend Ryerson and York Universities for a Masters of Arts.

Dragon Moon Press acquired Frey's debut novel Triptych in late 2009 after Frey and the acquisitions editor Gabrielle Harbowy met at a party at the Ad Astra science fiction convention. The book was released in April 2011, and re-released with bonus content in 2018. From there, Frey published The Accidental Turn Series (four books; meta-Epic Fantasy; 2015–2018) and The Skylark's Saga (two books; Steampunk Young Adult fiction; 2018–2019) with REUTS Publications, and self-published the 2019 Watty Award-winning The Woman Who Fell Through Time in 2020.

Frey was the recipient of the Toronto Arts Council Works in Progress Grant in 2018, and announced that she will be working on a novel-length version of her 2012 short story The Maddening Science as her granted project. Frey announced in 2023 that her novel "The Woman Who Fell Through Time" (also known as "A Woman of the Sea") had been picked up for publication with W by Wattpad (Wattpad Webtoon Studios) in spring 2024.

Frey is based in Toronto, and is currently represented by The Rights Factory.

== Critical reception ==
Triptych (2011) received a starred review from Publishers Weekly, and was named the #3 best Sci-Fi/Fantasy/Horror book of 2011 by Publishers Weekly's Rose Fox. Triptych was also nominated for the CBC Bookie Award for Science Fiction, the Lambda Literary Award for Bisexual Fiction, and the Lambda Literary Award for Science Fiction. Triptych won best Science Fiction Book at the 2012 San Francisco Book Festival, and was given an honorable mention for Science Fiction Book at the 2012 London Book Festival.

The Untold Tale (2015) was reviewed in Io9, where they compare the book to Redshirts, only "for fantasy, sort of."

The Forgotten Tale (2016) was reviewed by Publishers Weekly where they call the book, "thought-provoking" for the way that it covers the stereotypes of women in fantasy novels.

Frey has frequently presented an academic view on the geek scene in documentaries, podcasts, radio interviews, and television interviews. Her essay, "How Fanfiction Made Me Gay," was written about in the New York Times' Women in the World series.

The Skylark's Saga was optioned on a shopping agreement for an animated children's television series in autumn 2018 by Montreal-based production company Alpaca vs. Lama.

Other Awards and Accolades

- Honorable Mention, American Accolades Screenwriting Contest, The Dog Spirit, 2004.
- Best Short Story, Dragon*Con 2007 for Zoh Onna Omote (The Nothing Woman's Mask)
- Triptych named best Science Fiction / Fantasy book at the San Francisco Book Festival (May 2012)
- When the Hero Comes Home nominated for Best Anthology in the ForeWord Book Of The Year Awards (April 2012)
- Triptych nominated in the Bisexual and LGBT SF/F categories of the Lambda Literary Awards (March 2012)
- Triptych nominated in the 2nd Annual CBC Bookies Awards (March 2012)
- Triptych named one of the Best Overlooked Books of 2011 by The Advocate (Dec-Jan 2011–2012)
- Triptych named the #3 Best Book of 2011 in the Science Fiction/Fantasy/Horror category by Publishers Weekly & Genreville's Rose Fox. (2012)
- "Bloodsuckers" in Toronto Comics vol 2. nominated for a Prix Aurora Award (2016)
- To A Stranger named an Official Selection for the NEU WORLD INTERNATIONAL FILM FESTIVAL (2016), named an Official Selection and received an honorable mention with the DEPTH OF FIELD INTERNATIONAL FILM FESTIVAL (2016), and was an official Quarter-Finalist for the CARMESI HOUSE INTERNATIONAL SCREENWRITING CONTEST FOR DIVERSE VOICES (2017).
- Lips Lips Ice Passionate Plume Finalist, winner of the Ravishing Reads LGBTQA+ Award
- The Woman Who Fell Through Time, winner of a 2019 WATTY AWARD for Historical Fiction and A-Rating from BookLife.
- Time and Tide named to the New York Times Best Romance Books of 2024 list.

== Publications ==
Prose

- (Back), SilverThought Press, Spring 2008
- Triptych, Dragon Moon Press, April 2011; Reissued by Here There Be in 2020
- "The Once and Now-ish King", in When the Hero Comes Home. Dragon Moon Press, July 2011
- "On His Birthday, Reginald Got", in Klien. FutureCon Publications, December 2011
- The Dark Side of the Glass, Double Dragon Press, June 2012; Reissued by Here There Be as City by Night in 2020
- "Maddening Science", in When the Villain Comes Home, August 2012
- Hero Is A Four Letter Word, Short Fuse, September 2013; Reissued as an expanded edition by Here There Be in 2020
- "The Moral of the Story", in Wresting With Gods, Tesseracts 18. EDGE Publishing, January 2015
- "The Twenty Seven Club", in Expiration Date. EDGE Publishing, Spring 2015
- "Zmeu" in Gods, Memes and Monsters, Stone Skin Press, Summer 2015
- "How Fanfiction Made Me Gay" in The Secret Loves of Geek Girls, Bedside Press, December 2015
- The Untold Tale, Book #1 of the Accidental Turn series, Reuts Publications, December 2015
- Ghosts, an Accidental Novella, April 2016
- The Forgotten Tale, Book #2 of the Accidental Turn series, Reuts Publications, December 2016
- Arrivals, an Accidental Novella, April 2017
- The Silenced Tale, Book #3 of the Accidental Turn series, Reuts Publications, December 2017
- "The Promise" in Valor vol. 2: Wands, Fairylogue Press, 2018
- The Skylark's Song, Book #1 of the Skylark's Saga, Reuts Publications, 2018
- The Skylark's Sacrifice, Book #2 of the Skylark's Saga, Reuts Publications, 2019
- Time and Tide, W by Wattpad, 2024
- Nine-Tenths, Here There Be Publications, 2025

Screenplays

- To A Stranger, un-produced feature-length screenplay; Official Selection for the NEU WORLD INTERNATIONAL FILM FESTIVAL (2016), named an Official Selection and received an honourable mention with the DEPTH OF FIELD INTERNATIONAL FILM FESTIVAL (2016), and was an official Quarter-Finalist for the CARMESI HOUSE INTERNATIONAL SCREENWRITING CONTEST FOR DIVERSE VOICES (2017).

Poetry

- "Tobogganing", in The White Wall Review vol 32, Ryerson University Press, 2008
- "Water Garden", in The White Wall Review vol 32, Ryerson University Press, 2008
- "On the Hazards of Dating a Vancouver-Based Actor", in In My Bed Magazine vol 5, Fall 2009
- The Dark Lord and the Seamstress, (CreateSpace Independent Publishing) October 2014

Academic

- "Social, Political and Artistic Contexts, Affecting The Development of Kabuki from Origins to Contemporary Supakabuki, Prevalent in Masahi Todayama's Inu Yasha" – Bachelor of Arts thesis, Spring 2005, Brock University
- "Identiplay: Cosplay, Cons, Camp, and the Carnivalesque" – presented at the Pop Culture Association of America's annual conference, San Francisco, March 2008
- "Whose Doctor?" – presented at the Whoniversal Appeal academic conference at the University of Cardiff, Wales, November 2008
- "Un-caped Crusaders: Illness Memoirs, 9/11, and Comics" – presented at the Ryerson Grad Seminar, Spring 2009.
- "Modern Mixed Media: Techniques for Using Online Fandoms for Teaching and Research" – presented at the Technology and Pedagogy conference at York University in March, 2009.
- "Water Logged Mona Lisa: Who Is Mary Sue and Why Do We Need Her?" – Master of Arts thesis, Spring 2009, Ryerson and York Universities
- "Whose Doctor?", in Doctor Who In Time And Space, McFarland Press, April 2013.

Journalism

- "Dodesho?! Speak American Dammit!" in Fukuoka Now, September 2007
- "Living and Working In The Land of the Rising Sun" in Our Canada (Reader's Digest), October 2007
- "Power-Playing: Advice for Romance Writers Now That Fifty Shades of Grey is A Movie", in The Mary Sue, February 2015.

Comics

- "Bloodsuckers" and "Toronto the Rude" in The Toronto Comic Anthology vol 2, May 2015
- Ivy, an Accidental Turn prequel comic, November 2015
- "TTC Gothic" in The Toronto Comic Anthology vol 5, 2018
- "TTC Gothic: more stories" in Amazing Stories Magazine, vols 1 – 4, 2018

As Peggy Barnett (Erotica)

- Dear Abby, March 2013.
- Soon, July 2013.
- "Teneo, Tenere, Tenum" in Jacked In, Circlet Press; January 2013
- "The Silent Stars Go By" in Hot Holiday Reads vol 1: Holiday Spice, Short Fuse; December 2013 (also available as an audio book.)
- "Stealing Christmas" in Hot Holiday Reads vol 2: Christmas Nookies, Short Fuse; December 2014
- Lips Like Ice, Circlet Press; January 2015
- "Hung by the Fire" in Hot Holiday Reads vol 3: The Stockings Were Hung, Short Fuse, December 2015
- Official Selection, Kindle; July 2016
- Naughty and Nice Holiday Collection, Kindle, December 2016
