= Teddy Harvia =

American science fiction fan artist

- Harvia at Worldcon 2026
- Born: David Thayer
- Awards: Hugo Award for Best Fan Artist; 1991; 1995; 2001; 2002 Rebel Award; 1997
- Website: http://teddyharvia.wordpress.com/

David Thayer, better known by the pen name Teddy Harvia (an anagram), is an American science fiction fan artist. He was born in Oklahoma but grew up in and resides in Dallas, Texas.

As of 2010, Teddy Harvia has won the Hugo Award for Best Fan Artist four times, and has been nominated an additional sixteen times for the award. For his service to Southern science fiction fandom, Harvia was presented the Rebel Award by the Southern Fandom Confederation in 1997 at that year's DeepSouthCon.

Thayer was chair of the bid to host the Worldcon in Cancún, Mexico, in 2003. (The bid lost to Torcon III and the 61st World Science Fiction Convention was held in Toronto.)
