= Russ Chauvenet =

American chess player (1920–2003)

Louis Russell Chauvenet (February 12, 1920 – June 24, 2003) was an American champion chess player and one of the founders of science fiction fandom.

== Biography ==
=== Chess ===
Chauvenet was the U.S. Amateur Champion in 1959, as well as state champion for Virginia in 1942 through 1948 and for Maryland in 1963, 1969 and 1976. He also wrote columns for Chess Life. Chauvenet reached the level of Expert, a rating better than nine out of 10 chess players involved in tournament play.

In 1991, Chauvenet won the fourth National Deaf Championship, in Austin, Texas. In 1992, at Edinburgh, Scotland, the International Committee of Silent Chess awarded him its Grandmaster title. Chauvenet represented the US at the World Individuals four times: Amsterdam in 1980, Washington, D.C., in 1984 where he won the Silver medal, Stockholm in 1988 where he won an additional Silver medal, and in Edinburgh in 1992. Chauvenet also won three National Tournaments of the Deaf, at Chicago in 1980, Washington, D.C. in 1983 and Rochester in 1987.

=== Fandom ===
Chauvenet was a founder of Boston's The Stranger Club (the members of which were guests of honor at the 47th World Science Fiction Convention), and hosted its first meeting at his home in 1940. He also co-founded the National Fantasy Fan Federation, with Damon Knight and Art Widner, and was a member of First Fandom.

He coined the word fanzine in the October 1940 issue of his fanzine Detours and was for many years a member of the Fantasy Amateur Press Association (FAPA). He later coined prozine, a term for professionally published magazines containing science fiction stories.

=== Other avocations ===
Chauvenet was also an enthusiastic sailor, who built his own Windmill class sailboat and participated in regattas, as well as a medal-winning runner. He served as editor of the Windmill Class Association newsletter in addition to other positions and is one of 5 individuals names as honorary members of the class.

=== Early and family life ===
Chauvenet was born in Knoxville, Tennessee. He became completely deaf in 1930 at age 10, after suffering cerebro-spinal meningitis. He attended Central Institute for the Deaf and Wright Oral School, before graduating from Belmont Hill Preparatory School. He went on to Harvard, Boston College and the University of Virginia, receiving a Bachelor of Science in biology in 1943 and a Master of Science in chemistry in 1948 from Virginia. From 1943-1946 he was employed by the Calco Chemical Company in New Jersey, after which he worked with computers as a civilian employee of the U.S. Department of Defense from 1948 until his retirement.

His wife, Jane, was a teacher. Their son, Allen, is a pediatric oncologist; in 1963, son and father respectively won the Maryland junior chess championship and the state title.
