= Jack L. Chalker =

American science fiction and fantasy author (1944–2005)

Jack Laurence Chalker
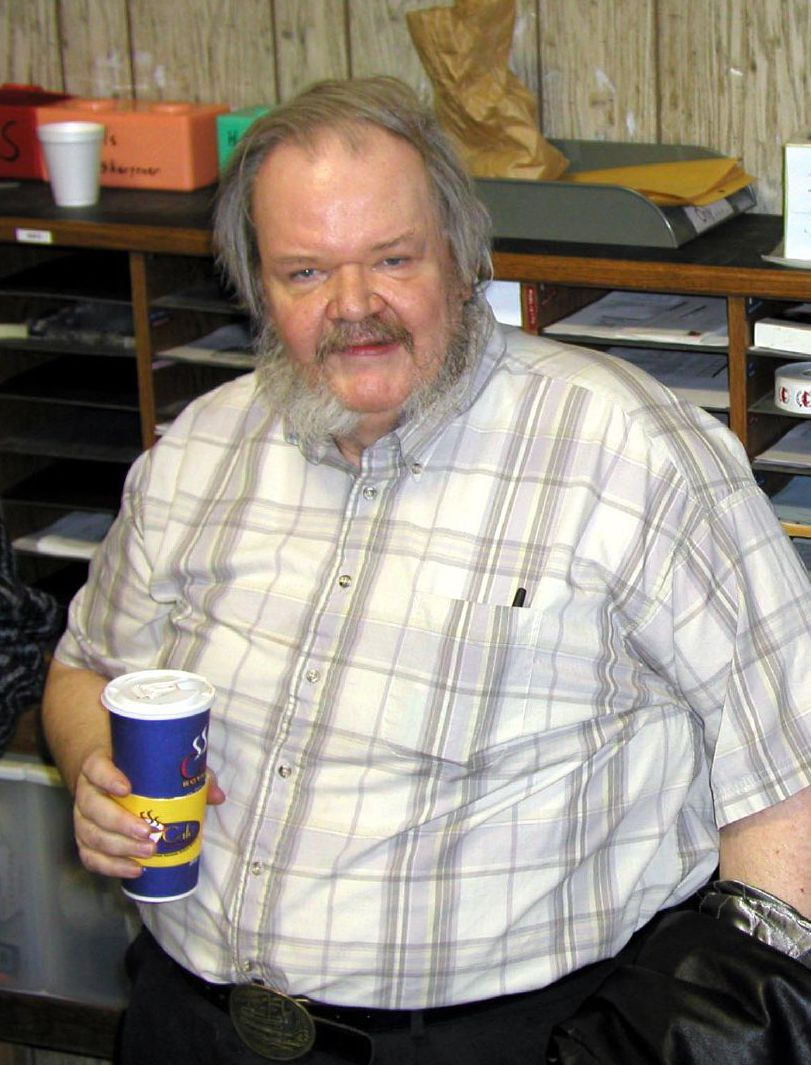
- Chalker in 2003
- Born: December 17, 1944; Baltimore, Maryland, United States
- Died: February 11, 2005 (aged 60); Baltimore, Maryland, United States
- Education: Towson University; Johns Hopkins University
- Occupations: Science fiction author, writer
- Spouse: Eva C. Whitley
- Children: 2

Jack Laurence Chalker (December 17, 1944 – February 11, 2005) was an American science fiction author. Chalker was also a Baltimore City Schools history teacher in Maryland for 12 years, retiring during 1978 to write full-time. He also was a member of the Washington Science Fiction Association and was involved in the founding of the Baltimore Science Fiction Society.

== Career and family life ==
Chalker was born and raised in Baltimore, Maryland. Some of his books said that he was born in Norfolk, Virginia although he later claimed that was a mistake; he attended high school at the Baltimore City College. Chalker earned a BA degree in English from Towson University, then named Towson State College, in Towson, Maryland. He was a theater critic for the school newspaper, The Towerlight, and in 2003, Towson University named Chalker their Liberal Arts Alumnus of the Year. He received a Master of Arts in Liberal Studies from Johns Hopkins University in Baltimore.

Chalker intended to become a lawyer, but financial problems caused him to become a teacher instead. He taught history and geography in the Baltimore City Public Schools from 1966 to 1978, most notably at Baltimore City College and the now defunct Southwestern Senior High School. Chalker lectured on science fiction and technology at the Smithsonian Institution in Washington, D.C., the National Institutes of Health in Bethesda, Maryland, and numerous universities.

Chalker was a member of the Maryland Air National Guard's 135th Special Operations Group, where he was a member of the group information office. He was deployed into Baltimore during the Baltimore riot of 1968.

Chalker married Eva Whitley in 1978 and had two children.

Chalker's hobbies included esoteric audio, travel, and working on science-fiction convention committees. He also had a great interest in ferryboats; at his fiancée's suggestion, their marriage was performed on the Roaring Bull boat, part of the Millersburg Ferry, in the middle of the Susquehanna River in Pennsylvania.

== Science fiction ==
Chalker joined the Washington Science Fiction Association in 1958, and in 1963, he and two friends founded the Baltimore Science Fiction Society. Chalker attended every World Science Fiction Convention, except one, from 1965 until 2004.

Chalker contributed a chapter to The New H. P. Lovecraft Bibliography in 1962; he published his first novel, A Jungle of Stars, in 1976.

He founded an amateur SF journal, Mirage, in 1960. He ran the fanzine until 1971 (a finalist nominee for the 1963 Hugo Award for Best Fanzine), producing ten issues. Another journal, Interjection, was published 1968–1987 in association with the Fantasy Amateur Press Association. Chalker also initiated a publishing house, Mirage Press, Ltd., for releasing nonfiction and bibliographic works concerning science fiction and fantasy.

Chalker's awards included the Daedalus Award (1983), The Gold Medal of the West Coast Review of Books (1984), Skylark Award (1980), and the Hamilton-Brackett Memorial Award (1979). He was twice a nominee for the John W. Campbell Award for Best New Writer and for the Hugo Award twice. Chalker was posthumously awarded the Phoenix Award by the Southern Fandom Confederation on April 9, 2005.

Chalker was a three-term treasurer of the Science Fiction and Fantasy Writers of America. Chalker was also the co-author (with Mark Owings) of The Science Fantasy Publishers (third edition during 1991, updated annually), published by Mirage Press, Ltd, a bibliographic guide to genre small press publishers which was a Hugo Award nominee during 1992. The Maryland Young Writers Contest, sponsored by the Baltimore Science Fiction Society, was renamed "'The Jack L. Chalker Young Writers Contest" effective April 8, 2006.

=== Novels ===
Chalker is best known for his Well World series of novels, but he also wrote many other novels (most, but not all, part of a series, or large novels which were split into 'series' by the publishers), and at least nine short stories.

Many of Chalker's works involve some physical transformation of the main characters. For instance, in the Well World novels, immigrants to the Well World are transformed from their original form to become a member of one of the 1,560 sentient species that inhabit that artificial planet. Another example would be that the Wonderland Gambit series resembles traditional Buddhist jataka-type reincarnation stories set in a science fiction environment. Samantha Chalker announced that Wonderland Gambit might be made into a movie, but supposedly its close resemblance to The Matrix resulted in the project being canceled.

At the time of his death, Chalker left one unfinished novel, Chameleon. He was planning to write another novel, Ripsaw, after Chameleon.

== Illness and death ==
On September 18, 2003, during Hurricane Isabel, Chalker passed out and was taken to a hospital where he was diagnosed with a coronary occlusion. He was later released, but was severely weakened. On December 6, 2004, he was again taken to hospital with breathing problems and disorientation, and was diagnosed with a skin infection. Chalker was hospitalized in critical condition, then upgraded to stable condition on December 9, although he did not regain consciousness until December 15. After several more weeks in deteriorating condition and in a persistent vegetative state, with several transfers to different hospitals, Chalker died on February 11, 2005, of kidney failure and sepsis at Bon Secours Hospital in Baltimore, Maryland.

Some of Chalker's remains are interred in the family plot at Loudon Park Cemetery in Baltimore. The remainder were distributed off the ferry between Hainan Island and the mainland, a ferry in Vietnam, White's Ferry on the Potomac River in Virginia on Father's Day 2007, and on author H. P. Lovecraft's grave in Providence, Rhode Island on December 17, 2005.

== See also ==
- Category:Novels by Jack L. Chalker
