= Magnum Opus Con =

Annual science fiction convention in U.S.

- Flyer for the first 1986 convention
- Status: Defunct
- Genre: Multi-genre
- Venue: various
- Locations: Macon, Georgia (1986); Columbus, Georgia (1987–1988); Greenville, South Carolina (1989–1994); Pine Mountain, Georgia (1995); Atlanta, Georgia (1996–1997, 2001); Athens, Georgia (1998–2000)
- Country: United States
- Inaugurated: 1986
- Most recent: 2001
- Organizer: Roland Castle/Middle Georgia Society for Fantasy and Science Fiction
- Filing status: Non-profit

Magnum Opus Con (MOC) was an annual multigenre convention which generally took place each spring in various cities in the U.S. states of Georgia and South Carolina from 1986 to 2001. Organized by comics retailer Roland Castle, the convention was designed to attract science fiction fans of all stripes. Over its 16-year run, MOC featured hundreds of celebrity guests and ran hundreds of hours of programming for fans of science fiction, fantasy, comic books, gaming, and other elements of fandom.

Most MOCs took place over three days, from Friday to Sunday. The convention featured a large floorspace for exhibitors, including collectibles merchants and comic book dealers. Along with panels, seminars, and workshops with industry professionals, MOC often featured previews of upcoming films and even a celebrity softball game.

Magnum Opus Con worked on a "membership" basis, which enabled attendees to gain admittance to the convention for the entire weekend. In later years, the attendees were required to be 18 years or older, or accompanied by an adult. By the early 1990s, the show became known for its parties and risqué cosplay events such as the "Bimbo Pageant," the "Slave Auction," and the "Mr. Macho Contest." Other late-night activities included the "MOC-Alympics," belly dancing, "MOC(k) Marriages," and "Casino Night." These events gradually became more of the focus of the convention, to the detriment of the panels and workshops.

Magnum Opus Con petered out by the early 2000s due to bad feelings and competition from the much larger and more popular Atlanta-based Dragon Con.

== History ==
The Macon Opus Con was founded in 1986 by comics retailer Roland Castle, owner of Comics Castle in Macon, Georgia. Castle was president of the Bloom County Fan Club (thus the name "Opus," in honor of the Bloom County character); he hoped (and ultimately failed) to get Bloom County creator Berkeley Breathed as the con's guest of honor. Castle created a nonprofit, the Middle Georgia Society for Fantasy and Science Fiction, under which to run the show, and the first MOC was held April 18–20, 1986, at the Macon Hilton. Official guests included Doctor Who stars Jon Pertwee and Louise Jameson, along with Star Trek actor James Doohan, authors Marion Zimmer Bradley and Andre Norton and artist Phil Foglio. In addition to panels and guests, the convention featured popular activities such as filk singing, two masquerades with the PG version being televised throughout the hotel closed circuit television, 24 hour gaming and gaming tournaments, Japanese anime, a video room, "con suite" and "a large huckster room".

The second MOC moved locations 100 miles to Columbus, Georgia, where it was co-organized by retailer Pat Robinson, owner of Columbus Book Exchange. It took place March 27–29, 1987, at the Columbus Ironworks Convention Center. That edition of MOC became notorious because of the death of Doctor Who actor Patrick Troughton. Although he had been warned by his doctors before leaving the UK not to exert himself because of his heart condition, Troughton appeared to be in good spirits and participated vigorously in the day's panels, and was looking forward to a belated birthday celebration, which was planned for the Saturday evening, as well as a screening of the Doctor Who story The Dominators, which Troughton had requested personally, on the Saturday afternoon. Troughton suffered a heart attack at 7:25 AM the next day, just after he had ordered his breakfast from the hotel staff. According to the paramedics who were called, Troughton died instantly.

MOC 3, now officially known as Magnum Opus Con was held March 25–27, 1988, at the Columbus Ironworks Convention Center.

For MOC 4, held March 17–19, 1989, the convention shifted locations 250 miles to Greenville, South Carolina, and the Hyatt Regency, where it stayed for six years. MOC 5, held March 23–25, 1990, focused on Star Trek, Doctor Who, comics, and film (featuring anime and a "cinema contest"). The convention included an art show and live role-playing games. MOC 7, held March 26–29, 1992, expanded to four days, from Thursday–Sunday.

By this time, organizer Roland Castle felt that the Atlanta-based Dragon Con (est. 1987) was impinging on his territory, and that DC employees, including organizer Edward E. Kramer, were disrupting MOC. [See Fandom, below.] Castle began a policy of "banning" various individuals from MOC, which eventually included official guests like Tom Deitz.

MOC 10 signaled a shift in many ways for Magnum Opus Con. After five years in Greenville, South Carolina, Castle moved MOC 225 miles to Callaway Gardens, in Pine Mountain, Georgia. As befitting its new location, MOC 10 attempted to become more family-friendly, toning down the revelry and eliminating the "Slave Auction" and the "Bimbo Pageant." Guests included the usual celebrities and science fiction authors, as well as NASA scientists and former astronauts. That year's show motto was "Bringing you the BEST in science AND science fiction!" In addition, after being held exclusively in March or April every year, MOC 10 was scheduled for July 13–16, 1995, the same weekend as Dragon Con. MOC 10 was dedicated to author Roger Zelazny, a scheduled guest who died shortly before the show. Despite, or maybe because, of all the changes, MOC 10 was not well attended.

To make up for the perceived failures of MOC 10, Castle organized "MOC 10A," which took place February 15–18, 1996, at the Adams Mark Hotel, in Charlotte, North Carolina. By all reports, MOC 10A returned to the debauchery of previous Magnum Opus Cons, with the Slave Auction, Bimbo Pageant, and Mr. Macho Contest all returning to prominence. Total attendance was reported to be around 450 people.

MOC 11 was held June 13–16, 1996, at the Downtown Radisson, in Atlanta, Georgia, again in competition with Dragon Con (which took place the following weekend). MOC 12 returned to its traditional March schedule, staying in Atlanta, and featuring comics guests like Keith Giffen, Alan Grant, and Simon Bisley. It also downsized a bit, returning to a three-day event. By this time, attendance at MOC was declining, in many ways due to competition from Dragon Con. (In June of that year, Castle publicly accused Dragon Con of sabotaging his convention and poaching MOC guests.)

For MOC 13, held March 20–22, 1998, the convention moved 75 miles to Athens, Georgia. and the History Village Inn, where it stayed for the next three years. That year, Castle organized "MOCtoberfest '98," held October 30–November 1, 1998, also at the History Village Inn in Athens.

MOC 15, held March 31–April 2, 2000, was Roland Castle's final show as convention chairman; he stepped down early the next year due to stress-related health reasons.

Magnum Opus Con's new co-chairmen were Monnie Robinson and Greg Bell, who had both been involved in MOC for many years. Robinson and Bell dubbed MOC 16 " The Sweet Sixteen Party," which was held March 15–18, 2001, at the Ramada Plaza Hotel Perimeter North, in Atlanta. Despite the new leadership, the show was not a success, and MOC 16 turned out to be the convention's last hurrah.

=== Dates and locations ===
Dates	Venue	Location	Official guests	Notes
April 18–20, 1986	Hilton	Macon, Georgia	Jon Pertwee, Louise Jameson, James Doohan, authors Marion Zimmer Bradley and Andre Norton and artist Phil Foglio	
March 27–29, 1987	Columbus Ironworks Convention Center	Columbus, Georgia	James Doohan, George Takei, DeForest Kelley, Grace Lee Whitney, Alan Dean Foster, Anthony Ainley, Louise Jameson, Michael Bishop, Jenette Goldstein, Patrick Troughton	Troughton dies of a heart attack while a guest of the convention
March 25–27, 1988	Columbus Ironworks Convention Center	Columbus, Georgia	Colin Baker, Anthony Ainley	
March 17–19, 1989	Hyatt Regency	Greenville, South Carolina	Guest of honor: Larry Niven; other guests: Nichelle Nichols, Robert McCammon, Brad Strickland, Brad Linaweaver, Sylvester McCoy, Angelique Pettyjohn, Tom Deitz	
March 23–25, 1990	Hyatt Regency	Greenville, South Carolina	Guests of honor: Marion Zimmer Bradley, Robert Asprin, Lynn Abbey; other guests: Steve Jackson, Terry Nation	
April 26–28, 1991	Hyatt Regency	Greenville, South Carolina	Brion James, John Levene, Roger Zelazny, Janet Kagan, Brad Strickland, Robert Asprin, Tom Deitz, Brad Linaweaver, Doug Chaffee, David O. Miller	
March 26–29, 1992	Hyatt Regency	Greenville, South Carolina	Marion Zimmer Bradley, Lois McMaster Bujold, Chelsea Quinn Yarbro, Roger Zelazny, Robert Asprin	Convention expands to four days; is named official Starfleet Region One Conference
April 1–4, 1993	Hyatt Regency	Greenville, South Carolina	Ben Bova, Melanie Rawn, Robert Asprin, C. J. Cherryh, Jane Fancher, Brad Strickland	
March 24–27, 1994	Hyatt Regency	Greenville, South Carolina	Timothy Zahn, Raymond Moody, David Weber, Steve White, Bruce Campbell, Patricia Tallman, Kane Hodder, Monique Gabrielle, Brad Strickland, Lawrence Watt-Evans David Prowse	
July 13–16, 1995	Callaway Gardens	Pine Mountain, Georgia	Chelsea Quinn Yarbro, Yvonne Craig, Gunnar Hansen, Sharon Green, Chris Potter, Bruce Boxleitner, David Weber, Steve White, Robert Picardo, Bruce Campbell, Dale Midkiff, Patricia Tallman, Spice Williams, Bruce McCandless II, Story Musgrave, Robert C. Springer	
June 13–16, 1996	Downtown Raddison	Atlanta, Georgia		
March 28–30, 1997	Downtown Raddison	Atlanta, Georgia	Keith Giffen, Alan Grant, Simon Bisley, Philip Xavier, Andrew Bryniarski	Convention returns to three-day format
March 20–22, 1998	History Village Inn	Athens, Georgia	Guests of honor: Garth Ennis, John McCrea, and Philip Xavier	
March 19–21, 1999	History Village Inn	Athens, Georgia		
March 31–April 2, 2000	History Village Inn	Athens, Georgia		
March 15–18, 2001	Ramada Plaza Hotel Perimeter North	Atlanta, Georgia	Tom Savini, Sandy Lynne, Philip Xavier	Four-day convention

== Guests ==
Over the years, MOC guests included Doctor Who actors like Colin Baker, Tom Baker, Louise Jameson, Jon Pertwee, and Patrick Troughton; Star Trek actors James Doohan, DeForest Kelley, George Takei and Grace Lee Whitney, celebrities like Bruce Boxleitner, Bruce Campbell, Phyllis Coates, Yvonne Craig, Chris Potter, and Tom Savini, science fiction authors Robert Asprin, Ben Bova, Marion Zimmer Bradley, Lois McMaster Bujold, Brad Strickland, David Weber, Timothy Zahn, and Roger Zelazny; comics creators like Keith Giffen, Alan Grant, Simon Bisley, Garth Ennis, John McCrea; and former astronauts Bruce McCandless II, Story Musgrave, and Robert C. Springer.

== Fandom ==
To promote the Magnum Opus Con, organizer Roland Castle published a 48-72 p. black-and-white fanzine called Fandom. The 'zine highlighted guests and events, showcased cosplay cheesecake photos, and served as a forum for Castle and MOC attendees to communicate. In later years, Castle used Fandom to detail his grievances against Dragon Con, which he claimed was attempting to squash his smaller-scaled convention.
