= Rebel Award =

- Country: United States
- Presented by: Southern Fandom Confederation
- First award: 1965
- Website: www.deepsouthcon.org

The Rebel Award is a lifetime achievement award for a science fiction fan "who has done a great deal for Southern Fandom." The Rebel is given annually by DeepSouthCon, a bidded convention held in different states of the former Confederacy.

There is no standard shape or image for the Rebel as each host convention creates their own unique interpretation of the award. The Rebel is presented in conjunction with Phoenix Award for a science fiction professional (author, artist, editor, etc.) meeting similar criteria. The award recipients are chosen by the host convention.

== List of Rebel Award winners ==
- 2024: Edward deGruy
- 2023: Bill Ritch
- 2022: Brandy Bolgeo Hendren
- 2021: Cheralyn Lambeth
- 2020: Raymond Boudreau & Jessica Styons & Rebecca Smith
- 2019: Ron McClung & Jeff Smith
- 2018: Rick Norwood
- 2017: Bob Ellis & Mike Pederson
- 2016: Pat Henry & Bill Harrison
- 2015: Michael Scott & Frank Schiavo
- 2014: Judy Bemis
- 2013: Regina Kirby & M. Lee Rogers
- 2012: Shelby Vick, Bill Zielke, Linda Zielke, Robert Zielke, & Becky Zielke
- 2011: Brad W. Foster
- 2010: Albin Johnson
- 2009: Randy Cleary
- 2008: Kelly Lockhart
- 2007: Bill Payne, "Dutch" Stacy, & Mickey Kilgore
- 2006: Dan Caldwell
- 2005: Naomi Fisher
- 2004: Dal Coger† & Sue Thorn
- 2003: Mike Kennedy
- 2002: Julie Wall
- 2001: Robert Neagle & Sam Smith
- 2000: Lynn Harris & Toni Weisskopf
- 1999: Tim "Uncle Timmy" Bolgeo
- 1998: Tom Feller & Wilson "Bob" Tucker
- 1997: Teddy Harvia
- 1996: Gary Robe & Corlis Robe
- 1995: J.R. "Mad Dog" Madden
- 1994: Don Cook & Bob Shaw
- 1993: G. Patrick Molloy
- 1992: Steve Francis & Sue Francis
- 1991: Samanda B. Jeude
- 1990: Charlotte Proctor
- 1989: Steven Carlberg & Maurine Dorris
- 1988: Sue Phillips & mike weber
- 1987: Lee Hoffman & Penny Frierson
- 1986: John A.R. Hollis
- 1985: Larry Montgomery & P.L. Caruthers-Montgomery
- 1984: Guy H. Lillian III
- 1983: John Guidry & Lynn Hickman
- 1982: Lon Atkins
- 1981: Dick Lynch & Nicki Lynch
- 1980: Jerry Page
- 1979: Cliff Amos
- 1978: Don Markstein
- 1977: Cliff Biggers & Susan Biggers
- 1976: Ned Brooks
- 1975: Meade Frierson III
- 1974: Ken Moore
- 1973: Hank Reinhardt
- 1972: No Award Given
- 1971: Janie Lamb
- 1970: Irvin Koch
- 1969: No Award Given
- 1968: No Award Given
- 1967: No Award Given
- 1966: David Hulan
- 1965: Al Andrews

† = award presented posthumously
