= Soulsmith =

Soulsmith may refer to:

- Soulsmith Trilogy, a 1990s trilogy of fantasy novels by Tom Deitz
  - Soulsmith, a 1990 novel by Tom Deitz (1952–2009), the first novel of the Soulsmith Trilogy
- Soulsmith, a 2016 novel by Will Wight in the Cradle fantasy series
- Soulsmith (film), 2017 Irish film

== See also ==
- Smith (disambiguation)
- Soul (disambiguation)
