= Phoenix Award (science fiction) =

- Country: United States
- Presented by: Southern Fandom Confederation
- First award: 1970
- Website: www.deepsouthcon.org

The Phoenix Award is a lifetime achievement award for a science fiction professional "who has done a great deal for Southern Fandom." The Phoenix is given annually by DeepSouthCon, a bidded convention held in different states of the former Confederacy.

There is no standard shape or image for the Phoenix as each host convention creates their own unique interpretation of the award. The Phoenix is presented in conjunction with Rebel Award for a science fiction fan meeting similar criteria. The award recipients are chosen by the host convention.

== List of Phoenix Award winners ==
- 2024: Milton J. Davis
- 2023: John G. Hartness
- 2022: Eric Flint†, David B. Coe
- 2021: Allen Wold
- 2020: Les Johnson
- 2019: Faith Hunter
- 2018: Joseph Green
- 2017: Simon Hawke, Aaron Allston
- 2016: Eugie Foster†, Jana Oliver
- 2015: Robert Asprin† & Diana Rowland
- 2014: Steve Jackson
- 2013: Robert Jordan†
- 2012: John Ringo
- 2011: Selina Rosen
- 2010: Jerry Pournelle
- 2009: Robert McCammon
- 2008: Jim Baen†
- 2007: Tom Deitz
- 2006: John Kessel
- 2005: Jack L. Chalker†
- 2004: Dr. Gregory Benford
- 2003: Rick Shelley† & Larry Elmore
- 2002: Allen Steele
- 2001: Sharon Green
- 2000: Jack McDevitt
- 1999: Danny Frolich
- 1998: David Weber
- 1997: James P. Hogan
- 1996: Jack C. Haldeman
- 1995: Darrell Richardson
- 1994: Toni Weisskopf
- 1993: Terry Bisson
- 1992: Brad Linaweaver & Brad Strickland
- 1991: Charles L. Grant
- 1990: Wilson Tucker
- 1989: Robert Adams
- 1988: Gerald W. Page
- 1987: Orson Scott Card & Hugh B. Cave
- 1986: Andrew J. Offutt
- 1985: Sharon Webb
- 1984: David Drake
- 1983: Doug Chaffee & Joe Haldeman
- 1982: Kelly Freas
- 1981: Mary Elizabeth Counselman
- 1980: Piers Anthony
- 1979: Jo Clayton
- 1978: Karl Edward Wagner
- 1977: Michael Bishop
- 1976: Manly Wade Wellman & Gahan Wilson
- 1975: Andre Norton
- 1974: George Alec Effinger
- 1973: Thomas Burnett Swann
- 1972: No Award Given
- 1971: R.A. Lafferty
- 1970: Richard Meredith

† = award presented posthumously
