= Triptych (Frey novel) =

2011 novel by J. M. Frey

- First edition
- Author: J. M. Frey
- Cover artist: Charles Bernard
- Language: English
- Genre: Science fiction
- Publisher: Dragon Moon Press
- Publication date: April 09, 2011
- Publication place: Canada
- Media type: Paperback and eBook
- Pages: 286pp
- ISBN: 1897492138

Triptych is a 2011 debut novel by Canadian author J.M. Frey. The novel follows three narrators as they recount the events surrounding major turning points in the life of Gwen Pierson, a languages specialist: Evvie Pierson, Gwen's mother a housewife in rural southern Ontario; Kalp, an alien refugee from a dead planet living in England and Gwen's lover; and Basil Grey, a Welsh computer engineer.

== Plot summary ==
Before

The novel begins in a small Welsh town in 2013, where Basil Grey, a mechanical engineer and a member of the United Nations' run institute, has just witnessed his lover, an alien named Kalp, being shot to death in their living room. Basil's coworkers, led by Agent Aitken, shot him for a traitor and a spy, and drag Basil out of the house and to the institute's interrogation rooms. He is joined by his wife, Gwen Pierson, and as she tries to convince him that Kalp had betrayed them, Basil has a revelation about a small mechanical device he had seen in the institutes workrooms, which he has nicknamed a "Flasher".

Part I: Back

Narrated by Evvie Pierson, the first part of the book opens on a fall day in 1983 on the Pierson Family farm. Evvie's gardening is interrupted when an alien spaceship crash lands in her raspberry patch and the pilot attempts to murder both her and her infant daughter, Gwennie. They are saved by Basil Grey and an adult Gwen Pierson, who didn't realize that the Flasher would make them travel backwards in time.

Over the course of twenty four hours, Basil attempts to repair the Flasher so they can make a return trip to the 21st Century; Gwen, Basil, and her father Mark bury both the body of the alien pilot and the space ship; and Gwen reveals to Evvie that they have a tumultuous relationship in the future and that Gwen has stopped speaking to her mother. Evvie blames herself and resolves to do her best to repair the rift when Gwen has grown up. Gwen also reveals that she was married to both Kalp and Basil in a triad relationship called an aglunate, a tradition of Kalp's people, but that Kalp was killed for selling secrets about the institute to a group of assassins who are targeting institute employees. With the help Evvie, Basil and Gwen realize that the assassins are time travelling to target aglunated institute employees and as such, Kalp can't have been the traitor.

Overwhelmed with relief and grieving their lost lover, Basil and Gwen return to 2013 to clear Kalp's name and to try to locate the actual traitor.

Evvie writes a letter to Kalp, intending to warn him of his impending death in an effort to change the future.

Part II: Middle

Told from Kalp's POV, this section encompasses his first meeting with Basil and Gwen (who are already dating and living together) at the institute through to his death. Kalp is assigned to a team with Gwen and Basil, who are working together to try to build a solar power generator based on shared alien technology. Over the course of the section, it is revealed that Kalp's home planet was destroyed in a natural disaster and a very small ship of refugees was able to escape and seek asylum on Earth. Kalp's family – his Agulnates Maru and Trus – were among the dead. Kalp had volunteered to work at the institute, which was set up by the United Nations in an effort to aid the aliens in acclimatizing to human cultures.

Overwhelmed by the kindness shown to him by Basil and Gwen, Kalp soon falls in love with the couple and moves in with them. He convinces them to become his lovers on Christmas Eve, several hours after Gwen has revealed that she has fallen pregnant with Basil's child. There is an extremely negative media backlash to their aglunation, and as a result the aglunate is attacked outside of a concert hall. Gwen loses the baby and Kalp is grievously injured.

An unknown assassins group begins to target institute employees, and Kalp is suspected of selling institute training secrets to the group and placed under house arrest. Kalp receives a vaguely threatening letter from an anonymous stranger and decides that he must attempt to escape the institute and clear his name. He is, however, caught by Agent Aitken and shot.

Part III: After

Basil and Gwen have returned to 2013 twenty four hours after they left. At first they are taken into custody for being AWOL and theft, but they eventually convince the institute of both Kalp's innocence and their own. They are allowed to join a secret ops mission to break the assassin's circle and capture the ring leaders.

During the assault, Gwen and Basil stumble upon a warehouse where exactly the same alien ship that they shot down in 1983 is preparing to travel back in time. They are surprised by the pilot – not an alien after all, but Agent Aitken, who reveals that she is both the mastermind behind the assassins circle and the traitor. She is an extreme bigot and zealot and has vowed to purge the world of the disgusting, unnatural people who participate in aglunates, and has figured out how to use the alien technology to travel in time to kill those who accept and love the aliens before they can grow up and pervert the institute.

Gwen is injured in the attempt to stop her, and Basil unsuccessful at destroying the ship. He is, however, able to sabotage it. He then realizes that Agent Aitken has travelled back to the Pierson Farm in 1983, where he and Gwen will shoot the ship down and kill Aitken before the rogue agent has the ability to murder infant Gwennie.

Next

Basil and Gwen travel to the Pierson Farm in 2013 to retrieve the buried space ship and Aitken's remains. They travel alone in order to maintain their privacy and to keep media speculation to a minimum before the trial of the remaining assassins.

After they have unburied the space ship, Mark coerces Basil to join him in mucking out barn. They discuss Basil's intentions towards Gwen, and Mark reminds Basil that he owes him a favour for destroying their betamax. Mark then offers Basil a family heirloom ring with which he'd like Basil to propose marriage to Gwen.

Basil decides that he will, both in memory of Kalp and in order to open a new chapter in their lives where the shadow of the tragedy can finally be left behind. As he approaches the farm house with the ring, Basil catches sight of Evvie and Gwen's tearful reconciliation through the kitchen window.

== Characters ==
=== Main characters ===
Gwen Pierson – a Canadian woman in her early thirties. She specializes in languages, and was recruited to the institute to help translate alien documents and speeches. She is Basil's girlfriend at the beginning of the novel and eventually also falls in love with and marries both Kalp and Basil in a traditional alien triad arrangement called an aglunate. Gwen is initially extremely reluctant to enter into the aglunate, but does eventually come to love Kalp as deeply as she loves Basil. Gwen is taciturn, generally snarky, and an only child.

Kalp – an alien refugee from a dead world. Kalp was a structural engineer/architect on his home planet, and was in an aglunate with Maru and Trus, who both died with the natural disaster struck. Desperately lonely and suffering acute culture shock at the beginning of the novel, he learns to adjust to Earth and falls in love with Gwen and Basil, his coworkers at the institute. They eventually form an aglunate of their own.

Basil Grey – a Welsh mechanical engineer and super-geek. He was recruited to the institute to help recreate beneficial alien technologies and placed on a team with Gwen. He wooed her with dirty alien poetry, and later enters into an aglunate with Gwen and Kalp. He has two older sisters and several nieces and nephews, whom he adores.

Evvie Pierson – A Canadian farmer's wife, and Gwen's mother. Evvie attempts to be open-minded about her daughter's relationships but doesn't approve of Basil, initially, and his horrified to learn that Gwen is sleeping with an alien. Eventually she comes to understand that Gwen is happy with her lovers, and to accept that her own perceptions of appropriate need to alter.

Mark Pierson – a Canadian farmer and Gwen's father.

Agent Aitken – a zealot and bigot who works for the institute and is disgusted by all humans who fall in love and enter into sexual relationships with the aliens. She is secretly the head of a ring of assassins who are killing aglunates, and murders Kalp. She is killed attempting to murder Gwen.

=== Reviews ===
"Debut author Frey knocks it out of the park with a remarkable tale of alien refugees, time travel, intrigue, the pervasive madness of grief, and love that transcends culture, gender, and species. Classic science fiction elements are smoothly updated for a modern audience." – Publishers Weekly's Rose Fox

"Time travel, aliens, and the politics of sexuality combine with tragic violence in Frey's deeply satisfying debut. Aliens seeking refuge from their broken planet find it on peaceful Earth. Gwen Pierson and Basil Grey work for the U.N., helping the aliens to integrate. When alien Kalp joins their team, they learn that Kalp's people mate in threes, and soon the trio become the first human–alien marriage. Violent protests and assassinations threaten to unravel the fragile trust between the refugees and their human hosts, so Gwen and Basil follow the assassins--back in time to the 1980s, where Gwen's parents are still adjusting to raising newborn Gwennie. The near paradox is appropriately disorienting, but the story is so well-grounded in the characters that it never once loses its course. Frey tells the story from varying points of view in distinct voices, imagining a world at once completely alien and utterly human."—Publishers Weekly Starred Review

"A stirring adventure, as well as a tender love story, from a first time author who truly embraces the limitless possibilities the future may bring. JM Frey's Triptych satisfies any sci-fi reader looking for a different take on the first contact motif, or anyone looking to explore the possible evolution of human sexuality and love." –Lambda Literary.

"I was afraid we'd be left with a lot of technical asides and scientific musings to explore the aliens. Fortunately, nothing could be further from the truth. Instead of being cold and clinical, the approach here is warm and human. I won't spoil any of what happens between them, but I will say I shed tears of joy and tears of sorrow for this unusual family, and that's an accomplishment few authors can claim. Not only is this a wonderful story, but it's a wonderfully told story." –Sally Sapphire, The Bibrary Bookslut

"I finished Triptych in one go last night, couldn't put it down even. It's a very impressive first novel and if Ms. Frey continues to do with science fiction what she's done in this book she might single-handedly be credited with reviving the entire genre. Bravo! Encore, encore!" –Todd McCaffrey, author of the Dragonriders of Pern series.

Triptych has also been panned as an extended treatise on alien/human sex and for its lack of worldbuilding and depth of exploration of Kalp's homeworld and culture. However, other commenters have pointed out that Kalp's assimilation into Earth culture is what feeds the tragedy of his life.

=== Awards ===
San Francisco Book Festival Science Fiction / Fantasy – winner

Lambda Literary Awards (June 2012) Science Fiction / Fantasy / Spec Fic – nominated Bisexual Fiction – nominated

CBC Bookie Awards (March 2012) Science Fiction / Fantasy / Spec. Fic – nominated

Publishers Weekly's Best Books of 2011 (February 2012) Science Fiction / Fantasy / Horror – #3 on the list

London Book Festival (January 2012) Science Fiction / Fantasy – Honourable mention

The Advocate's Best Overlooked Books of 2011 (January 2012) Voted onto the list by readers of The Advocate
