= Yvonne Craig =

American actress (1937–2015)

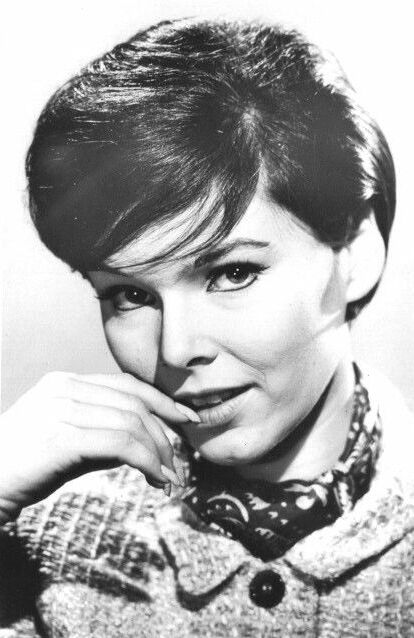
- Craig in 1967
- Born: Yvonne Joyce Craig; May 16, 1937; Taylorville, Illinois, U.S.
- Died: August 17, 2015 (aged 78); Los Angeles, California, U.S.
- Occupation: Actress
- Years active: 1957–2011
- Known for: Batman; Star Trek; Kissin' Cousins; It Happened at the World's Fair
- Spouses: Jimmy Boyd (m. 1960; div. 1962) Kenneth Charles Aldrich (m. 1988)
- Website: yvonnecraig.com

Yvonne Joyce Craig (May 16, 1937 – August 17, 2015) was an American actress best known for her role as Barbara Gordon/Batgirl in the 1960s television series Batman. Other notable roles in her career include Dorothy Johnson in the 1963 movie It Happened at the World's Fair, Azalea Tatum in the 1964 movie Kissin' Cousins, and the green-skinned Orion Marta in the Star Trek episode "Whom Gods Destroy" (1969). The Huffington Post called her "a pioneer of female superheroes" for television. Craig was a philanthropist and "an advocate for workers unions, free mammograms, and equal pay for women".

== Early life and education ==
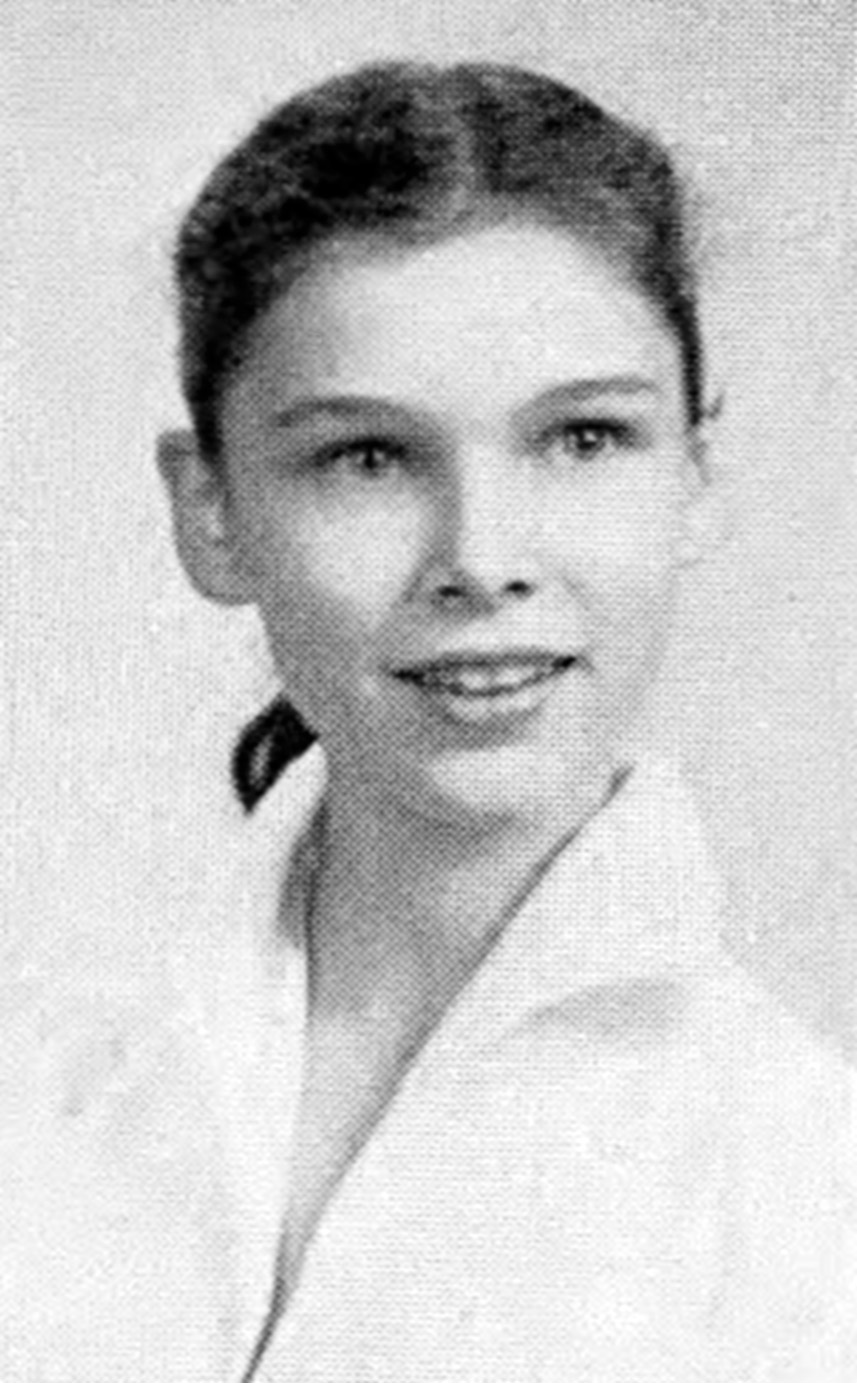
Yvonne Joyce Craig 1953 Sunset High School yearbook photo

Craig was born in Taylorville, Illinois, the first of Maurice Melvin and Pauline Virginia (née Rogers) Craig's three children. Craig's father's work caused the family to move in 1951 from Columbus, Ohio, to the Oak Cliff neighborhood in Dallas, Texas. Craig first attended W. H. Adamson High School for a semester and then Sunset High School for three years.

She did not graduate from high school, due to the lack of "a single PE credit". Craig explained the lack of credit, saying "The funny thing about the PE credit is, I was going to the Edith James School of Ballet, and she'd have recitals at the art museum, and [the PE teacher] would come see me dance my little legs off, and then I'd come in to PE class, wrapped up, and claim I'd sprained and couldn't play a sport". Craig had enough credits to get into college and attended UCLA, but did not graduate.

== Career ==
=== Ballet ===
Craig started studying ballet at the age of 10 at the Edith James School of Ballet in Dallas. She was discovered there by the Russian ballerina Alexandra Danilova. While still in high school, Danilova helped her obtain a scholarship to the School of American Ballet in New York City. While there, the 16 year-old Craig lived with roommate and future comedienne Carol Burnett at the Rehearsal Club on West 53rd Street.

In 1954 and at 17 years of age, Craig joined the Ballet Russe de Monte Carlo as its youngest corps de ballet member. She was a professional ballerina with the company for three years. This training was helpful when she performed stunts while playing Batgirl. She left the ballet company in 1957 "over a disagreement on casting changes" and moved to Los Angeles in the hopes of continuing her dancing career.

=== Acting ===
Craig explained how her acting career started in Los Angeles, saying "...this guy invited me to his office and said, 'I'm making a movie, do you want to be in it?' I said, 'No, I'm a ballet dancer and working my way toward soloist... I don't want to be an actress'. But we became friends, so one night we're out to dinner, and this man comes to the table and said John Ford's son Patrick was going to make a movie with John Wayne's son, who was also named Patrick. He asked, 'Are you an actress?' I couldn't talk – I had my mouth full – and the guy who took me out said, 'She is, and I'm her manager, what can we do for you?'". The movie was 1959's The Young Land, which also starred Dennis Hopper. Craig was paid US$750 a week (equivalent to $8,283 in 2025) to act in the film, versus the $94 a week she had earned in ballet.

=== 1950s ===
One of her earliest television roles was in an episode of the TV series Perry Mason ("The Case of the Lazy Lover", 1958) alongside Neil Hamilton, who played her stepfather (later Hamilton played Police Commissioner James Gordon, Batgirl's father). Also, on 4 April 1958 she had a role on a CBS Schlitz Playhouse production, "Papa Said No." She appeared in three 1959 films – The Young Land, The Gene Krupa Story, and Gidget – and also guest-starred in the TV series Mr. Lucky as Beverly Mills in the episode "Little Miss Wow" (also 1959).

=== 1960s ===
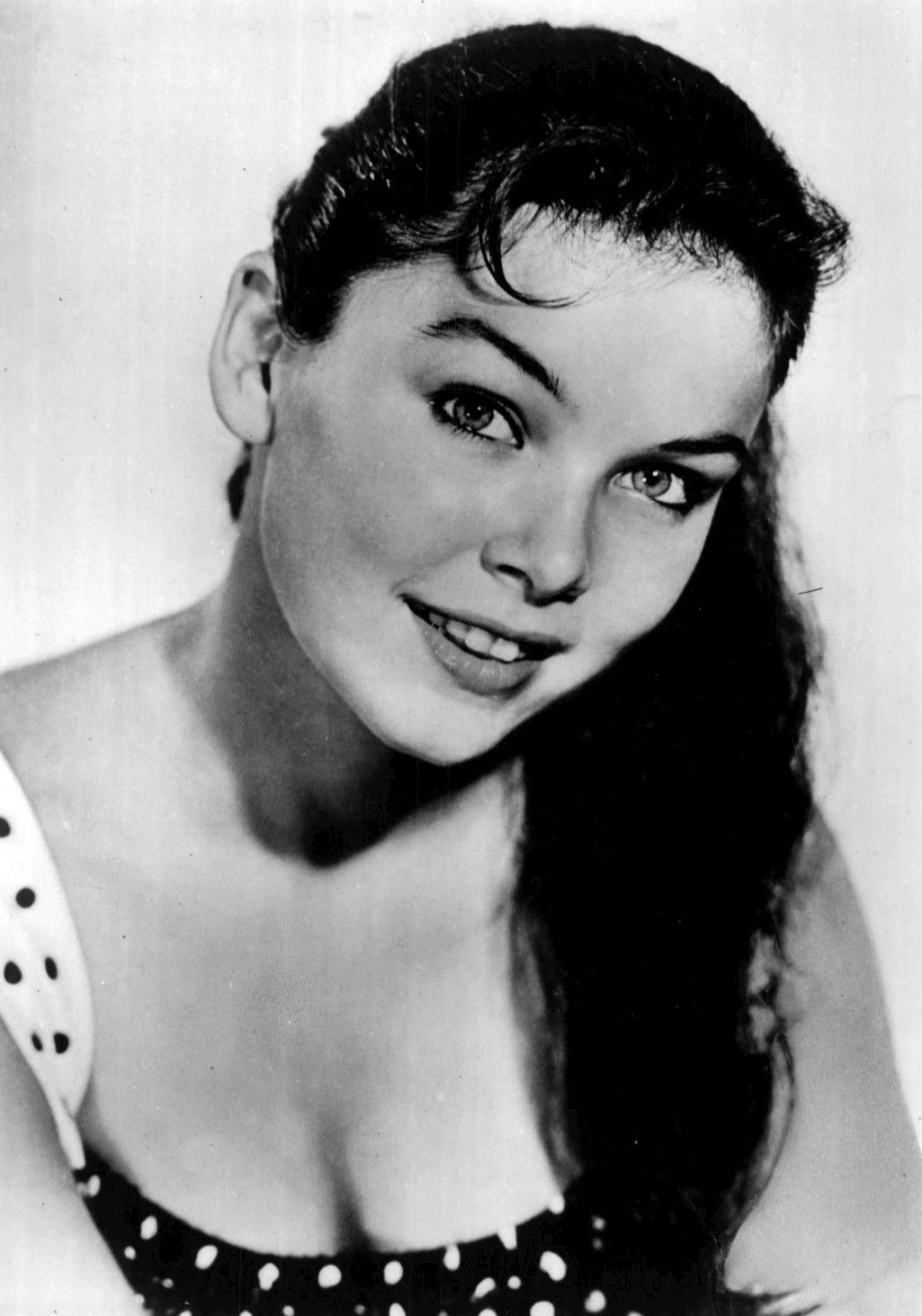
Craig in 1960

In 1960, Craig appeared with Bing Crosby in High Time, where she met her costar and soon-to-be husband Jimmy Boyd. In 1961, she appeared in Seven Women from Hell, featured alongside Cesar Romero, and, in 1962, she guest-starred on the Western Laramie in the episode "The Long Road Back". Boyd and Craig divorced that year.

Craig appeared with Elvis Presley in two films: It Happened at the World's Fair (1963) and Kissin' Cousins (1964). She also starred in the low budget science fiction film Mars Needs Women (1966) with Tommy Kirk and appeared in In Like Flint (1967) as a Russian ballet dancer opposite James Coburn.

During the 1960s, Craig regularly appeared in television drama series. She appeared five times on The Many Loves of Dobie Gillis, portraying five separate girlfriends for the titular character between 1959 and 1962. In 1960, she played Jo, a young photographer with Charles Bronson in Man with a Camera. In 1964, Craig guest-starred as Carol, an underwater photographer, on Voyage to the Bottom of the Sea ("Turn Back the Clock"). In 1965, Craig appeared in The Big Valley ("The Invaders") and Kentucky Jones ("Kentucky′s Vacation"),

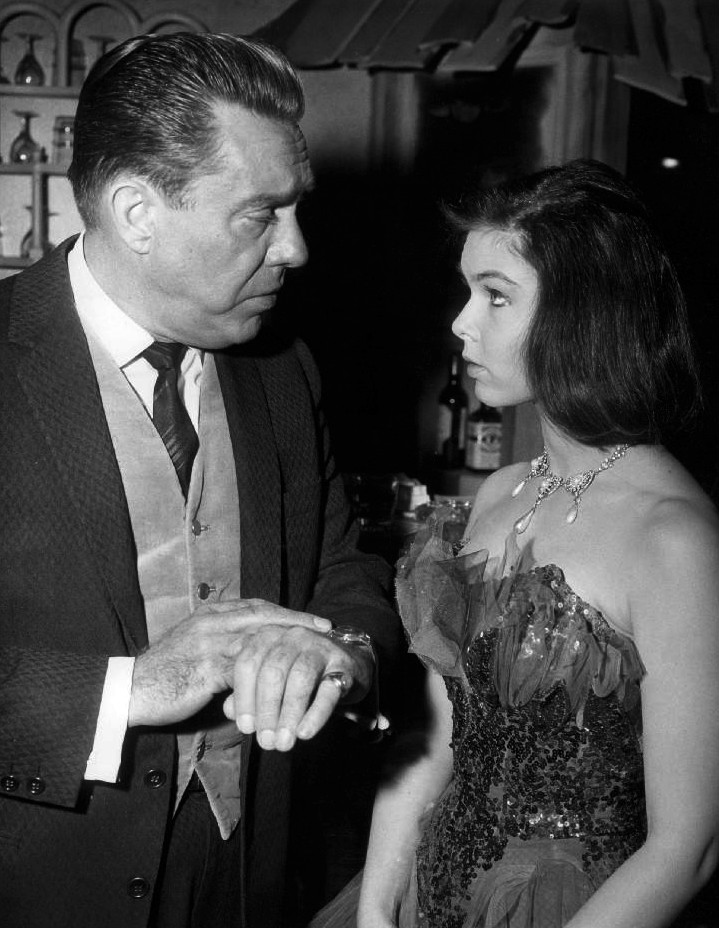
Edmond O'Brien and Yvonne Craig on Sam Benedict in 1963

Craig played a Navy nurse with exotic Arabian dance skills in an episode of McHale's Navy ("Pumpkin Takes Over") and in an episode of The Big Valley with Lee Majors and Barbara Stanwyck; both aired in 1965. That same year, she appeared in an episode of The Man from U.N.C.L.E. ("The Brain-Killer Affair"), where she helps solve the mystery of a brain-endangering poison. The following year, she came back as an U.N.C.L.E. employee in a theatrical film, One Spy Too Many, expanded from the episode "The Alexander the Greater Affair". In an episode of The Wild Wild West ("The Night of the Grand Emir") in 1966, she played an assassin who performs an exotic Arabian dance. In a 1968 episode of The Ghost & Mrs. Muir ("Haunted Honeymoon"), she played Gladys Zimmerman, a bride-to-be who was stranded overnight at Gull Cottage.

Craig played a main character and performed the vocals for part of the soundtrack for Ski Party (1965) with Frankie Avalon. She was also Natasha, the Russian ballerina, in the spy film parody In Like Flint (1967) starring James Coburn.

=== Batgirl ===
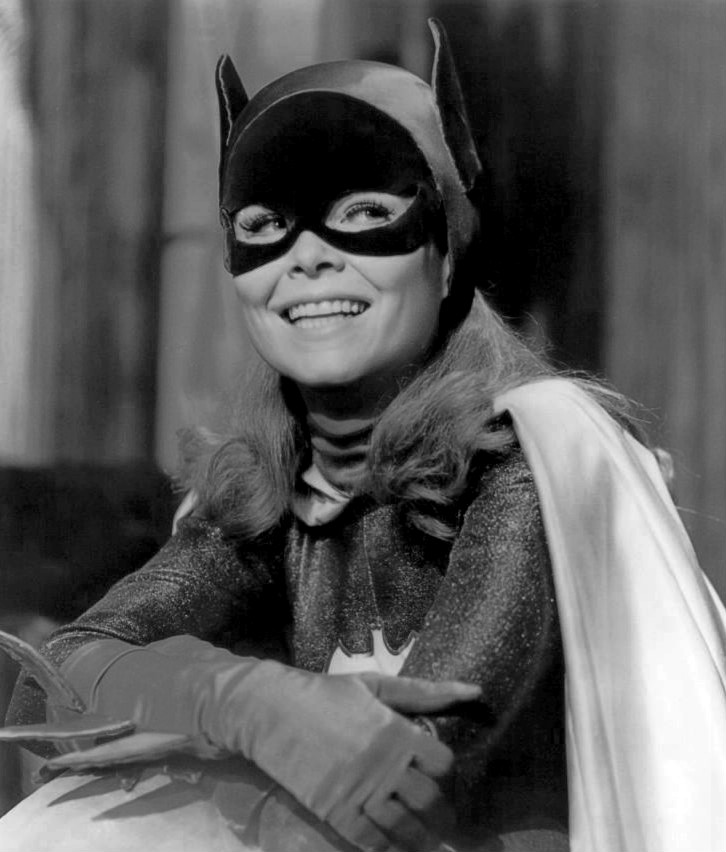
Craig as Batgirl in 1967

From September 1967 until March 1968, Craig appeared in her highest-profile role as Batgirl/Barbara Gordon for the third and final season of the 1960s ABC TV series Batman. As Batgirl, she wore a purple and yellow outfit and rode a "purple motorcycle with white lace trim", whereas her alter ego Barbara Gordon was the librarian daughter of Commissioner Gordon. The New York Times praised her for "add[ing] a scrappy girl-power element" to a TV series it described as "campy".

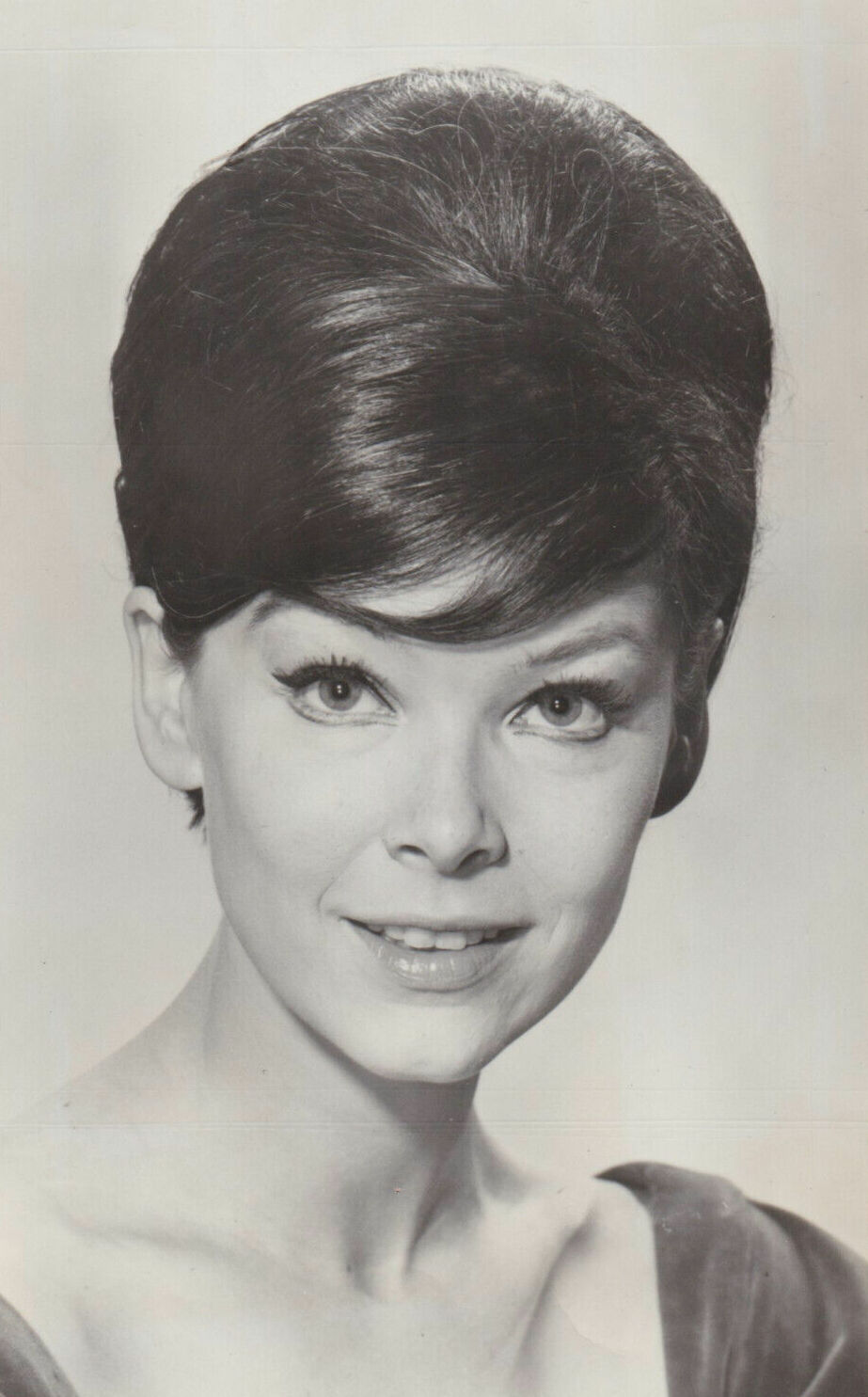
Yvonne Craig in Batman 1968 press photo

Craig did her own stunts on the show. "Although they didn't want me to do my stunts (and I ultimately did my own stunts), I mean, I kind of talked them into it. They knew that I danced and what they didn't know was that I rode a motorcycle so I could do the stuff on the bikes." She did complain about riding the Batgirl Cycle. "They had taken off the shock absorbers to put on the bat wings, so, whenever I went over a bump, it was like jumping off a table stiff-legged." The Batgirl Cycle was a customized 1967 Yamaha YCS1 Bonanza 180.

Co-star Burt Ward described working with Craig, saying "Yvonne was a dear friend and a wonderful actress to work with. We had a great time on Batman. We were friends. She got along great with Adam and myself and everybody else. She was just a delightful person with a sparkling personality. She had an energy and brightness to her that was just uplifting".

While acting on Batman, Craig appeared as a contestant on the game show The Dating Game in 1967.

After Batman ended, Craig continued to act in television. She appeared in guest roles in It Takes a Thief, The Mod Squad, Mannix, Love, American Style, and Emergency!

=== "Marta" in Star Trek ===
In 1969 Craig appeared on Star Trek as Marta, a green-skinned Orion woman in the episode "Whom Gods Destroy". In the episode, former Starfleet Captain Garth (Steve Ihnat) is incarcerated in a mental asylum on a distant planet. Garth lures Captain Kirk (William Shatner) to visit him in order to escape by hijacking the Enterprise. In the Star Trek canon, Orion women are described as "... like animals. Vicious. Seductive. They say no human male can resist them". Garth uses Marta, also an escaped inmate, in an attempt to have her seduce Kirk through dance and then murder him.

Craig related the problems in having to wear green body makeup from head to toe in the episode. "Susan [Oliver, who portrayed the Orion "Vina" in the show's pilot episode "The Cage"] and I were supposed to be from the same planet. Only they couldn't remember how they got Susan green in the first-season episode – they somehow had lost the makeup. So, they had to devise a substitute formula. I had skid marks because the makeup wouldn't stay on. Then, they sprayed me with Liquid Bandage, which has to be removed with acetone, so my skin was all burned – I was a walking disaster. When you perspire, Liquid Bandage won't stick, so here I was, walking around with moss hanging from my armpits. It was just hideous. I would take two showers at the studio, then go home and take an oil bath, and then take another shower to get the remainder of it off. Then, I would start all over again the next day".

Craig discussed having to provide her own choreography, saying "When they had to audition me they said, 'Can you do a three-minute dance?' and I said, 'Unless you're doing The Red Shoes, three minutes is a long time,' but I said, 'Yes, I can do a three-minute dance if you want it, but you'll probably just have to cut it to pieces, because that's crazy'. It's nuts, but it was fun to do".

=== 1970s ===
From 1969 to 1972, she appeared in four episodes of the comedy series Love, American Style. In a 1970 episode of Land of the Giants ("Wild Journey"), she played one-half of a humanoid, time-observing duo (with Bruce Dern), who chase two of the Earth castaways (series stars Gary Conway and Don Marshall) into the past, ultimately forcing them to relive the flight that sent them to the giants' planet.

=== Batgirl "Equal Pay Act" public service announcement ===
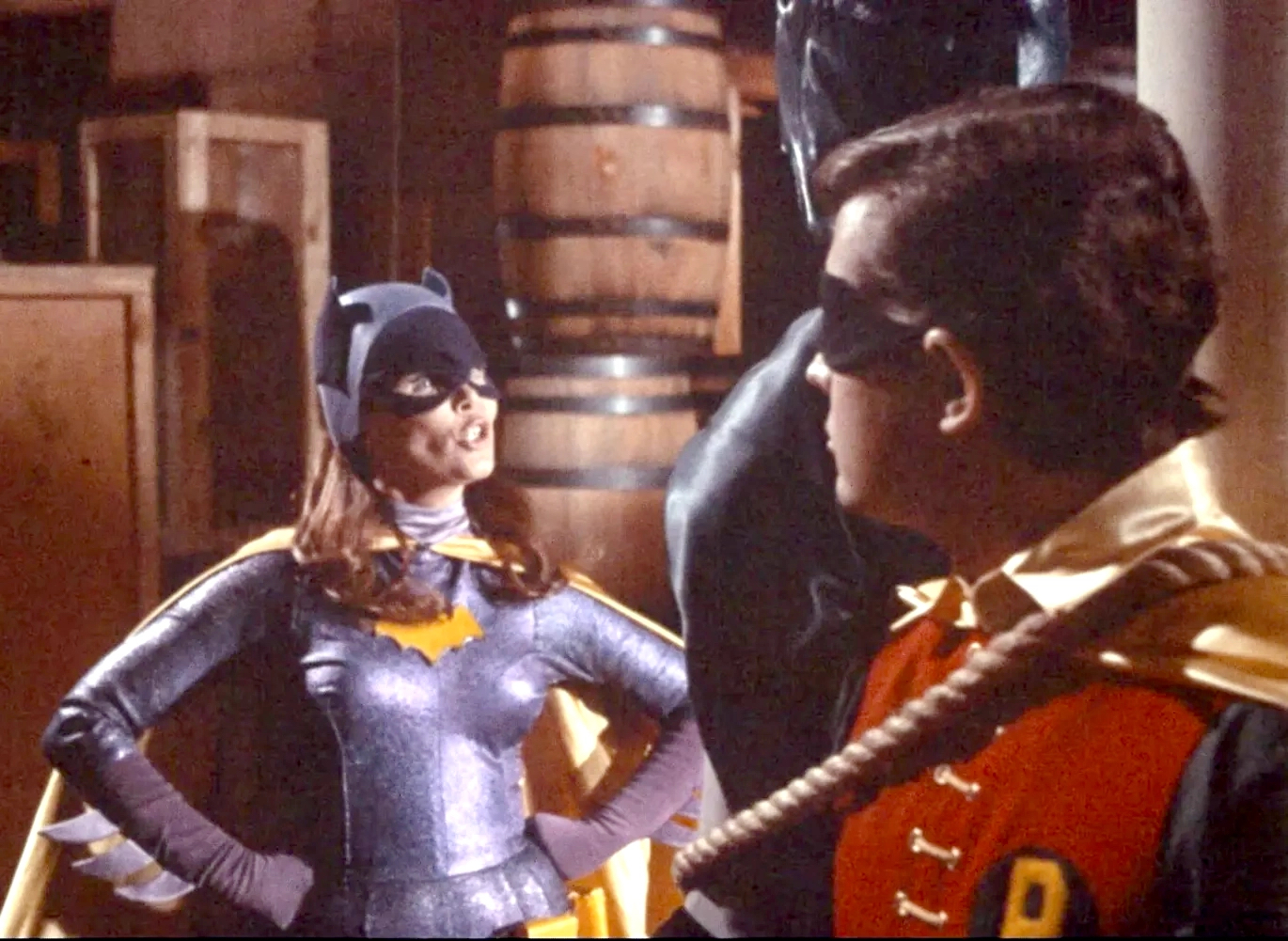
1973 Department of Labor, Wage and Hour Division public service announcement, featuring Yvonne Craig as Batgirl, Dick Gautier as Batman and Burt Ward as Robin

In 1973 Craig reprised her Batgirl role in a public service announcement (PSA) promoting equal pay for women sponsored by the U.S. Department of Labor Wage and Hour Division.

In the PSA, Batman and Robin were tied to a post threatened by a ticking time bomb. Batgirl arrives but refuses to release them because she is paid less than Robin, in violation of the Equal Pay Act of 1963. The PSA was written and directed by Sidney Galanty, and narrated by the Batman TV series creator and producer William Dozier. Dick Gautier played Batman, due to Adam West distancing himself from the character.

In 1973, Craig appeared in a first-season episode of Kojak ("Dark Sunday"), and in 1977, she made a guest appearance in The Six Million Dollar Man ("The Infiltrators").

=== 1980s ===
When her Hollywood career slowed in the 1980s, Craig ventured into private business after tiring of the roles she was offered. She said "I was being offered the same kinds of roles all the time and just thought, 'Why would you bother repeating yourself?'"

In 1988, Craig married Harvard-educated lawyer, investor, and real estate developer Kenneth Charles Aldrich. Briefly a co-producer of industrial shows, Craig began a new career as a real estate broker.

=== 1990s and later career ===
Craig was the producer for Comic Book Kid (1993). Craig appeared in the documentary film Ballets Russes (2005). From 2009 to 2011, she voiced Grandma on the animated children's series Olivia.

== Public appearances at conventions ==
In the 1980s Craig attended many comic and fan conventions, signing photos and talking with fans.

Marvel and DC comic book letterer Steve Haynie remembered Craig's interaction with convention goers, saying "Yvonne Craig's first convention appearance was at the 1988 Magnum Opus Con in Columbus, Georgia. She was going to give away autographed photos, but a few of us talked her out of that by pointing out that other guests supported themselves by selling photos. We warned her about the autograph dealers that would swoop in to take advantage of her generosity. She gave in with, 'OK, then. How about fifty cents?' We told her no again. I took off for a few minutes, and when I came back she agreed to go as high as two dollars apiece. All the money was donated to a charity the local Star Fleet chapter worked with... Yvonne Craig enjoyed meeting fans".

Fellow actress Julie Newmar said of Craig when she attended conventions, "My memory of her, especially, was her ebullience... that's the kind of person she was... A smile, always a smile. And she would always show up in these marvelous clothes. They were all made of this silky kind of material. It's body-hugging. It's what our Catwoman and Batgirl costumes should have been made out of. Kind of similar but very clinging and comfortable. She was buxom and adorable... Everyone liked her".

== Autobiography ==
Craig published an autobiography called From Ballet to the Batcave and Beyond (2000).

== Illness and death ==
Craig died at age 78 at her home in Pacific Palisades, Los Angeles, California, on August 17, 2015, from breast cancer that had spread to her liver.

== Filmography ==
=== Film ===
Year	Title	Role	Notes
1957	Eighteen and Anxious	Gloria Dorothy McCormick	
1959	Gidget	Nan	
1959	The Young Land	Elena de la Madrid	
1959	The Gene Krupa Story	Gloria Corregio	
1960	High Time	Randy "Scoop" Pruitt	
1961	By Love Possessed	Veronica Kovacs	
1961	Seven Women from Hell	Janet Cook	
1963	It Happened at the World's Fair	Dorothy Johnson	
1964	Kissin' Cousins	Azalea Tatum	
1964	Advance to the Rear	Ora	Uncredited
1964	Quick, Before It Melts	Sharon Sweigert	
1965	Ski Party	Barbara Norris	
1966	One Spy Too Many	Maude Waverly	
1966	One of Our Spies Is Missing	Wanda	
1967	In Like Flint	Natasha	
1968	Mars Needs Women	Dr. Marjorie Bolen	
1971	How to Frame a Figg	Glorianna Hastings	
1990	Diggin' Up Business	Lucille	
2005	Ballets Russes	Herself	Documentary

=== Television ===
Year	Title	Role	Notes
1958	Schlitz Playhouse	Suzanne Stacey / Helen Meade	2 episodes
1958	Perry Mason	Patricia Faxon	Episode: "The Case of the Lazy Lover"
1959	Bronco	Stephanie Kelton	Episode: "Bodyguard"
1959	Philip Marlowe	Connie	Episode: "Child of Virtue"
1959	The DuPont Show with June Allyson	Annie	Episode: "The Girl"
1959	Mr. Lucky	Beverly Mills	Episode: "Little Miss Wow"
1959–1962	The Many Loves of Dobie Gillis	Linda Sue Faversham / Elspeth Hummaker / Hazel Grimes / Myrna Lomax / Aphrodite Millican / Girl #1	6 episodes
1960	Man with a Camera	Jo Stokes	Episode: "Hot Ice Cream"
1960	Hennesey	Nurse Harriet Burns	Episode: "Scarlet Woman in White"
1960	The Chevy Mystery Show	Carolyn	Episode: "Murder Me Nicely"
1960	Checkmate	Judy	Episode: "The Cyanide Touch"
1960	The Barbara Stanwyck Show	Susan Mowry	Episode: "House in Order"
1960–1964	77 Sunset Strip	Tina Nichols / Willie Miller / Kristan Royal / Luanna Staunton	4 episodes
1961	The Detectives	Ivy	Episode: "Quiet Night"
1961	Peter Loves Mary	Darcy Robinson	Episode: "That Certain Age"
1961	Tales of Wells Fargo	Libby Gillette	Episode: "The Remittance Man"
1961	The Aquanauts	Kathy	Episode: "The Rainbow Adventure"
1961	Michael Shayne	Nan Palmer	Episode: "It Takes a Heap o' Dyin'"
1961	The Jim Backus Show	Debbie	Episode: "Dora's Vacation"
1961	Margie	Cynthia	Episode: "The Initiation"
1961	Ichabod and Me	Liza Halliday	Episode: "Teenage Journalist"
1961	Mrs. G. Goes to College	Sally	Episode: "Mrs. G.'s Private Telephone"
1962	Follow the Sun	Veronica St John	Episode: "A Ghost in Her Gazebo"
1962	The New Breed	Louise Pittman / Edna Pittman	Episode: "Hail, Hail, the Gang's All Here"
1962	I'm Dickens, He's Fenster	Hillary	Episode: "A Small Matter of Being Fired"
1962	Laramie	Ginny Malone	Episode: "The Long Road Back"
1962	Death Valley Days	Emma	Episode: "To Walk with Greatness"
1962	The Dick Powell Show	'Mary'	Episode: "In Search of a Son"
1962	Wide Country	Anita Callahan	Episode: "The Bravest Man in the World"
1962–1963	Sam Benedict	Amy Vickers / Angela Larkin	2 episodes
1963	Vacation Playhouse	Abby Young	Episode: "Hooray for Love"
1964	Dr. Kildare	Carol Devon	Episode: "A Day to Remember"
1964	Channing	Kathy O'Reardon	Episode: "My Son, the All-American"
1964	Wagon Train	Ellie Riggs	Episode: "The Link Cheney Story"
1964	Tom, Dick, and Mary	Louise Meeker	Episode: "Bad Day at Bristol Court"
1964	Voyage to the Bottom of the Sea	Carol	Episode: "Turn Back the Clock"
1965	Valentine's Day	Sally Whitfield	Episode: "For Me and My Sal"
1965	McHale's Navy	Nurse Suzie Clayton	Episode: "Pumpkin Takes Over"
1965	The Man from U.N.C.L.E.	Cecille Bergstrom	Episode: "The Brain-Killer Affair"
1965	Kentucky Jones	Shirley	Episode: "Kentucky's Vacation"
1965	My Favorite Martian	Louise	Episode: "Keep Me from the Church on Time"
1965	Ben Casey	Mary Dyboski Carter	Episode: "If You Play Your Cards Right, You Too Can Be a Loser"
1965	The Big Valley	Allie Kay	Episode: "The Invaders"
1966	The Wild Wild West	Ecstasy La Joie	Episode: "The Night of the Grand Emir"
1966	Mister Roberts	Carol Jennings	Episode: "Damn the Torpedoes"
1966	My Three Sons	Vickie Malone	Episode: "If at First"
1967	Mars Needs Women	Dr. Marjorie Bolen	Television film
1967	Batgirl	Barbara Gordon / Batgirl	Television short
1967–1968	Batman	Barbara Gordon / Batgirl	26 episodes
1968	The Ghost & Mrs. Muir	Gladys Zimmerman	Episode: "Haunted Honeymoon"
1968	It Takes a Thief	Roxanne	Episode: "The Bill Is in Committee"
1968	The Mod Squad	Tara Chapman / Lila Mason	Episode: "Find Tara Chapman!"
1969	Star Trek	Marta	Episode: "Whom Gods Destroy"
1969	The Good Guys	Dr. Cummings	Episode: "Communications Gap"
1969–1972	Love, American Style	Kathy / Helen / Janet / June	4 episodes
1969–1973	Mannix	Ada Lee Hayes / Mrs. Diana Everett	2 episodes
1970	The Courtship of Eddie's Father	Maryanne Atwater	Episode: "Don't Look Now, But Your Scorpio's Rising"
1970	Land of the Giants	Berna	Episode: "Wild Journey"
1970	Three Coins in the Fountain	Dorothy	Television film
1971–1972	The Partners	Michelle / Denise / Jessica	2 episodes
1972	O'Hara, U.S. Treasury	Inez Malcolm	Episode: "Operation: Rake-Off"
1973	Jarrett	Luluwa	Television film
1973	The Magician	Dr. Nora Zabriskie	Episode: "The Man Who Lost Himself"
1973	Kojak	Liz	Episode: "Dark Sunday"
1974	Emergency!	Edna Johnson	Episode: "Gossip"
1976	Holmes & Yoyo	Sherri	Episode: "Key Witness"
1977	The Six Million Dollar Man	Lena Bannister	Episode: "The Infiltrators"
1979	Starsky & Hutch	Carol	Episode: "Starsky vs. Hutch"
1983	Fantasy Island	Cindy	Episode: "Remember... When?"
2009–2011	Olivia	Grandma (voice)	29 episodes

== Bibliography ==
- Craig, Yvonne (2000). From Ballet to the Batcave and Beyond. New York: Kudu Press. ISBN 0-9678075-6-5.
