= Welcommittee =

Welcome committee

A welcommittee is usually a group of volunteers of an organization with the goal of reaching out to new members in a sort of Welcome Wagon-approach. The word "welcommittee" is a portmanteau combining the words, "welcome" and "committee". Among some United Kingdom residents, the word is sometimes shortened to "welco" or "WelCom".

The term originated in the 1950s in science fiction fandom with the National Fantasy Fan Federation which still has an active welcommittee. Other notable fandom-based welcommitees include the Star Trek Welcommittee started by Jacqueline Lichtenberg and the British Science Fiction Association. The concept also has been adopted by many host committees of various science fiction conventions as an outreach to those new to fandom.

Although the welcommittee concept has a long history in fandom, the advent of the Internet culture has led the term to evolve beyond the fandom subculture. A recent trend is for the term to be adopted by various wiki communities. Wikipedia's sister project, Wikinews had an active welcommittee.
