= JordanCon =

Fan convention dedicated to Robert Jordan's The Wheel of Time

Coordinates: 33°54′9″N 84°28′35″W

- JordanCon 2010 Flyer
- Status: Active
- Genre: Wheel of Time
- Venue: Crown Plaza Ravinia
- Locations: Atlanta, Georgia
- Country: United States
- Inaugurated: 2009
- Attendance: 600+ (in 2014)
- Organizer: Jennifer Liang, Chair
- Filing status: Non-profit
- Website: http://www.jordancon.org/

JordanCon is a North American convention held annually in Atlanta, Georgia, that celebrates Robert Jordan's fantasy book series The Wheel of Time, as well as other science fiction and fantasy works. The convention is a 501c4 tax exempt charitable organization founded in honor of the late Robert Jordan.

== History ==
=== Founding ===
JordanCon was founded by Jennifer Liang. The first JordanCon was held at the Alpharetta Embassy Suites, in Alpharetta, Georgia, April 17–19, 2009. The guest of honor was Harriet McDougal, widow of Robert Jordan. Fan Guest of Honor was Wilson Grooms. Guests also included writer Brandon Sanderson, and publisher Tom Doherty. Performances by The Lost Boys and Big City Burlesque rounded out the weekend. Over 250 people attended and over $3,000 were raised on behalf of the Mayo Clinic.

Programming highlights included a recording of Robert Jordan dictating a portion of the prologue to The Gathering Storm.

=== Past conventions ===
JordanCon 2010 was held April 23–25 at the Crowne Plaza Ravinia. Guests included writers Brandon Sanderson, Jana Oliver and David Wong. Toastmaster for the weekend was Matthew Hatch. Attendance was approximately 300 people.

JordanCon 2011 was held April 15–17 at the Crowne Plaza Ravinia. The guest of honor was author David B. Coe. Toastmaster for the weekend was Richard Fife. Additional guests included Eugie Foster and Brandon Sanderson.

JordanCon 2012 was held April 20–22 at the Doubletree Hotel in Roswell, Georgia. The guests of honor include author Mary Robinette Kowal, artist Sam Weber, and toastmaster Melissa Craib Dombrowski. They were joined by Eugie Foster, Emilie P. Bush and Dr. Michael Livingston. Attendance was approximately 250 people.

JordanCon 2013 was held April 19–21 at the Doubletree Hotel in Roswell, Georgia and hosted DeepSouthCon 51, an annual roving Southern US regional science fiction convention. The guests of honor were artist Michael Whelan and author Seanan McGuire.

JordanCon 2014 was held April 11–13 at the Doubletree Hotel in Roswell, Georgia. The guests of honor were author Patrick Rothfuss and artist Larry Elmore. Additional guests included Brandon Sanderson and Harriet McDougal.

JordanCon 2015 was held April 17–19 at the Atlanta Marriott at Perimeter Center in Atlanta, Georgia. The guests of honor were author Saladin Ahmed and artist Todd Lockwood.

JordanCon 2016 was held April 22–24 at the Atlanta Marriott at Perimeter Center in Atlanta, Georgia. The guests of honor were author Catherine Asaro and artist John Picacio. Toastmaster was Linda Taglieri. JordanCon 2016 also played host to DeepSouthCon 54. The theme was Con of Valere.

JordanCon 2017 was held April 21-23, 2017 at the Atlanta Marriott at Perimeter Center in Atlanta, Georgia. The guests of honor were author Charles E. Gannon and author Stephen Hickman. Toastmaster was Amanda Keen. The theme was Tel'aCon'Rhiod, the Con of Dreams.

JordanCon 2018 was held April 20-22, 2018 in Atlanta, Georgia at the Crown Plaza Ravinia. The guests of honor were Jason Denzel and Stephanie Law. Toastmaster was Aubree Pham. The theme was SeanCon 2, The Return.

JordanCon 2019 was held April 26-28, 2019 at the Crown Plaza Ravinia in Atlanta, GA. The guests of honor were Brent Weeks and Dan dos Santos. Toastmaster was Paul Bielaczyc. The theme was Shai'Con.

JordanCon 2020 was planned for April 17-19, 2020. The Guests of honor were to be Faith Hunter and Justin and Annie Stegg Gerard. The con was cancelled on March 15, 2020, due to the COVID-19 pandemic.

JordanCon 2021 was held July 16-18, 2021 at the Crowne Plaza Atlanta Perimeter at Ravinia hotel. The Author Guest of Honor was Marie Brennan whose works include "Turning Darkness Into Light" and Hugo Award-nominated Victorian adventure series "The Memoirs of Lady Trent".
