= Gabrielle Harbowy =

American author, editor, and anthologist

- Education: Rutgers University
- Occupations: editor, anthologist, writer
- Writing career
- Genres: Science fiction, Fantasy
- Website: www.gabrielleharbowy.com

Gabrielle Harbowy is an American author, editor, and anthologist. She is a literary agent at Corvisiero Literary Agency. She has written novels and role-playing games for the Pathfinder Roleplaying Game and Dungeons & Dragons franchises.

== Early life ==
Harbowy received a B.A. from Rutgers University.

== Career ==
Harbowy started her career as a pricing analyst at Scholastic Corporation. She was a submissions editor at Apex Magazine. She was also a copyeditor for Pyr, an imprint of Prometheus Books. Later, she was a managing editor and editor-in-charge at Dragon Moon Press. In June 2026, she was promoted to full literary agent at Corvisiero Literary Agency.

Harbowy is also an author, writing science fiction and fantasy novels and short stories. In 2010, her short story "Swimming Lessons" was a finalist in the Parsec Awards. Her book Hellmaw: Of the Essence was the runner-up in the science fiction category at the San Francisco Book Festival in 2016. She has written role-playing adventure games for the Pathfinder Roleplaying Game and Dungeons & Dragons franchises. She also runs Pathfinder and Dungeons & Dragons games at conventions.

She is an active member of the International Association of Media Tie-In Writers, the LGBTQ+ Editors Association, and the Science Fiction and Fantasy Writers Association.

== Awards ==
- Parsec Awards Finalist, Short Fiction category (2010)
- Runner-up, Science Fiction category, San Francisco Book Festival (2016) For Hellmaw: Of the Essence

== Works ==
=== Novels ===
- Hellmaw: Of the Essence. TEGG, 2016.
- Pathfinder Tales: Gears of Faith. Paizo, 2017. ISBN 978-0765384409.
- Hearts Are Jerks, Heart Bow Books, 2020. ISBN 978-1734552607.
- Aether's Pawn, Dragon Moon Press, 2021. ISBN 978-1774000472. (Note: This is Of the Essence, revised and re-released after going out of print.)

=== Anthologies edited ===
- When the Hero Comes Home. co-edited with Ed Greenwood. Dragon Moon Press, 2011. ISBN 978-1897492253. (ForeWord Book of the Year Finalist)
- When the Villain Comes Home. co-edited with Ed Greenwood, Dragon Moon Press, 2012. ISBN 978-1897492499.
- When the Hero Comes Home 2. co-edited with Ed Greenwood. Dragon Moon Press, 2013. ISBN 978-1897492710.
- Jacked In: Transhumanist Erotica. Circlet Press, 2014. ISBN 978-1613900949.
- The Complete Guide to Writing for Young Adults. Dragon Moon Press, 2015. ISBN 978-1897492819.
- Women in Practical Armor, co-edited with Ed Greenwood. Evil Girlfriend Media, 2016. ISBN 978-1940154138.

=== Short fiction ===
- "Descent of the Wayward Sister" in Cthulhurotica. Dagan Books, 2010. ISBN 978-0983137306.
- "Keeping Time" in When the Hero Comes Home. Dragon Moon Press, 2011. ISBN 978-1897492253.
- "Deserter" (with Marie Bilodeau) in Beast Within 2: Predator and Prey. Graveside Tales, 2011. ISBN 978-0983314127
- "Starkeep" in When the Villain Comes Home. Dragon Moon Press, 2012. ISBN 978-1897492499
- "Arpeggio" in Metastasis: An Anthology to Support Cancer Research. Wolfsinger Pub, 2013. ISBN 9781936099542
- "Blood Magic" in Witches, Stitches and Bitches. Evil Girlfriend Media, 2013. ISBN 9781940154015.
- "Inheritance" in Pathfinder Tales. Paizo, 2013. ISBN 978-1-60125-861-8.
- "Ghostlights" in When the Hero Comes Home 2 (ebook edition). Dragon Moon Press, 2013. ISBN 978-1897492710.
- "Catalyst" in Stars of Darkover. Marion Zimmer Bradley Literary Works Trust, 2014. ISBN 978-1938185250.
- "Skin Deep" (with Leah Petersen) in Carbide Tipped Pens: Seventeen Tales of Hard Science Fiction. Tor, 2014. ISBN 978-0765334312.
- "X is for..." in B is for Broken. Poise and Pen, 2015. ISBN 978-0-9936990-8-5.
- "H is for..." in C is for Chimera. Poise and Pen, 2016. ISBN 978-1988233000.
- "The Voice of the Trees" in Women in Practical Armor. Evil Girlfriend Media, 2016. ISBN 978-1940154138.
- "A Study of Sixes" in Crossroads of Darkover. Marion Zimmer Bradley Literary Works Trust, 2018. ISBN 9781938185526.
- "Cold Comfort" in Fire: Demons, Dragons and Djinns. Tyche Books, 2018. ISBN 978-1928025917.
- "All the Light in the Room" in Interdimensions 2024: Stories from the Gen Con Writers' Symposium. Atthis Arts, 2024. ISBN 978-1961654235.

=== Non-fiction ===
- "Next Year in Jerusalem" in Invisible 2: Personal Essays on Representation in SF/F, edited by Jim C. Hines. 2015.
- "Mom's Sneaky Tree" in Chicken Soup for the Soul: It's Beginning to Look a Lot Like Christmas, 2019. ISBN 978-1611599916.

=== Role-playing game adventures ===
- Grotto of the Deluged God (PFS #9-22), Pathfinder RPG (Paizo) (2018)
- Forge of Fangs (DDAL #8-15), Dungeons and Dragons: D&D Adventurers League (2019)
- Calling Upon the Dead (DDAL RMH-11), Dungeons and Dragons: D&D Adventurers League (2022)
- Behold...H'Catha (Spelljammer Academy #4), Dungeons and Dragons: D&D Beyond (2022)
- Moondance: Gate to Argantos. Archvillain Games, 2022.
- Tome of Demons III. Archvillain Games, 2023.
