= Southern Fandom Confederation =

- Abbreviation: SFC
- Formation: 1970
- Founder: Meade H. Frierson, III
- Type: Non-profit
- Purpose: Southern U.S. fandom
- Region served: Southern United States
- Official language: English
- President: Jennifer Liang
- Vice President: M. Lee Rogers
- Secretary: Tom Feller
- Treasurer: G. Patrick Molloy
- Website: www.southernfandom.com

The Southern Fandom Confederation is an association of science fiction fans who reside in or who have other associations with the Southern United States This unincorporated not-for-profit organization is often associated with the DeepSouthCon, and indeed holds their annual business meeting there. There is, however, no direct link from the SFC to the DSC—that is, neither organization in any way controls the other.

The SFC was founded in 1970 and Meade H. Frierson, III served as the first president. The current and tenth president is Jennifer Liang, who succeeded Warren Buff at DeepSouthCon 51. The SFC serves as a clearing house of information regarding southeastern fan clubs, conventions, mailing lists, and other items of regional interest.

SFC honors winners of the Phoenix (which is awarded to a science fiction professional editor, author, or artist with connections to the South) and the Rebel Award (which is awarded to a like-placed fan) with lifetime SFC memberships. The winners of those awards are selected by the convention committee of that year's DeepSouthCon.
