= Tom Deitz =

American writer (1952–2009)

- Born: Thomas Franklin Deitz; January 17, 1952; Georgia, U.S.
- Died: April 27, 2009 (aged 57)
- Education: University of Georgia (BA, MA)
- Occupations: Novelist; professor; artist
- Writing career
- Language: English
- Years active: 1989–2002
- Genre: Fantasy
- Notable awards: Phoenix Award; 2007

Thomas Franklin Deitz (January 17, 1952 – April 27, 2009) was an American fantasy novelist, professor, and artist from Georgia. He was best known for authoring the David Sullivan contemporary fantasy series, though he also authored three other fantasy series and a standalone novel set in the same universe as the David Sullivan series.

He was an assistant professor at Gainesville State College, where he was named faculty member of the year in 2008, and an adjunct professor at two other colleges. Deitz was awarded the Phoenix Award in 2007 for contributions toward Southern science fiction and fantasy fandom.

Deitz died on April 27, 2009, of heart failure after having a heart attack in January of the same year.

== Biography ==
Thomas Franklin Deitz was born January 17, 1952, in Georgia. He earned both a Bachelor and a Master of Arts in medieval English from the University of Georgia.

Deitz won the Phoenix Award in 2007 for lifetime achievement in promoting Southern fandom. This award was given at the annual DeepSouthCon, a traveling convention in the southeastern United States. In 2007, it was held in Dickson, Tennessee, as OutsideCon 20.

Deitz was an adjunct English faculty member at Gainesville State College, Lanier Tech, and Tri-County Community College, and received a tenure-track appointment as assistant professor in Fall 2008 at Gainesville State College. He was recognized as GSC's adjunct faculty member of the year in 2008.

In addition to writing, Deitz's creative outlets included creating murals and fantasy art, participating in drama productions (with minor roles in a number of community and college productions), model automobile collecting, costuming, and other pursuits via the Society for Creative Anachronism. He was a founding member of the SCA's Barony of Bryn Madoc.

Deitz died on Monday, April 27, 2009, of heart failure. He had a heart attack in January of that year and was a candidate to receive a ventricular assist device (VAD), but had suffered too much damage to his heart for the device to be implanted.

== Works ==
=== David Sullivan series ===
1. Windmaster's Bane (1986, Avon, ISBN 0380750295)
2. Fireshaper's Doom (1987, Avon, ISBN 0380753294)
3. Darkthunder's Way (1989, Avon, ISBN 0380755084)
4. Sunshaker's War (1990, Avon, ISBN 0380760622)
5. Stoneskin's Revenge (1991, Avon, ISBN 0380760630)
6. Ghostcountry's Wrath (1995, Avon, ISBN 0380768380)
7. Dreamseeker's Road (1995, Avon, ISBN 0380774844)
8. Landslayer's Law (1997, Avon, ISBN 0380786494)
9. Warstalker's Track (1999, Eos, ISBN 0380786508)

Though not part of this series, Deitz’ The Gryphon King (1989, Avon, ISBN 0380755068) is set in the same universe.

=== Soulsmith Trilogy ===
1. Soulsmith (1991, Avon, ISBN 0380762897)
2. Dreambuilder (1992, Avon, ISBN 0380762900)
3. Wordwright (1993, Avon, ISBN 0380762919)

=== A Tale of Eron series ===
1. Bloodwinter (1999, Bantam Spectra, ISBN 0553378635)
2. Springwar (2000, Bantam Spectra, ISBN 0553378643)
3. Summerblood (2001, Bantam Spectra, ISBN 0553380702)
4. Warautumn (2002, Bantam Spectra, ISBN 0553380710)

=== Thunderbird O'Conner series ===
1. Above the Lower Sky (1994, William Morrow & Co., ISBN 0688137164)
2. The Demons in the Green (1996, Avon, ISBN 0380782715)
