= Selina Rosen =

- Born: February 2, 1960; Arkansas
- Occupation(s): Publisher, editor, author

Selina Rosen (born February 2, 1960) is a U.S. science fiction publisher, editor, and author. In 1995 she founded her own publishing house, Yard Dog Press, specializing in the adventure, fantasy, and science fiction genres. She is the 2011 recipient of the Phoenix Award, a lifetime achievement award for a science fiction professional, presented by the Southern Fandom Confederation.

Rosen's published works include fantasy Jabone's Sword and Sword Masters; dark fantasy/horror The Boat Man, Fright Eater, Gang Approval, The Host and Material Things; humorous The Bubba Chronicles, The Ghost Writer, How I Spent the Apocalypse, Queen of Denial, and Recycled; science fiction Chains of Freedom, Chains of Destruction, and Chains of Redemption, plus Fire & Ice, Hammer Town, Reruns, Strange Robby, and (with Laura J. Underwood) Bad City and Bad Lands. They also include the non-fiction It's Not Rocket Science: Spirituality for the Working-Class Soul.
