= Art Widner =

Art Widner (1917 or 1918-2015) was a longtime science fiction fan and fanzine editor.

He has been one of the organizers the first science fiction fan club in Boston (The Stranger Club) in 1940. s President of the N3F in 1947. He has been the contributor to and an editor of many fanzines, including early sf fanzines Fanfare and Yhos.

He has been credited with inventing the first science-fiction themed board game, Interplanetary, in 1943.
