= Richard C. Meredith =

American novelist

- Richard C. Meredith pictured with one of his own oil paintings
- Born: Richard Carlton Meredith; October 21, 1937; Alderson, West Virginia, United States
- Died: March 8, 1979 (aged 41); Milton, Florida, United States
- Occupations: Writer; illustrator; graphic designer; copy editor; newspaper editor
- Spouse: Joy Gates (1963–1979)
- Children: Kira Chimene; Jefferson Conan; Derek Carlton; Rand Calvin
- Relatives: Joseph (father); LaVon (mother)
- Writing career
- Language: English
- Period: 1962–1979
- Genres: Science fiction, Supernatural fiction
- Notable works: We All Died at Breakaway Station; The Timeliner Trilogy; Run, Come See Jerusalem
- Notable awards: Phoenix Award, DeepSouthCon 8 (1970)

Richard Carlton Meredith (October 21, 1937 – March 8, 1979), was an American writer, illustrator and graphic designer, best known as the author of science fiction short stories and novels including We All Died at Breakaway Station and The Timeliner Trilogy.

== Biography ==
=== Early life ===
Meredith was born on October 21, 1937, in Alderson, West Virginia, United States, the first son of Joseph and LaVon Meredith. The family moved several times before eventually settling in St. Albans, West Virginia late in 1942 or early in 1943, where his father, a pipe-fitter by trade, found employment as a technician in a chemical plant involved in the development and production of synthetic rubber. The family remained there until 1956, during which time Meredith's sister Sandra was born.

During Meredith's years at high school and one year at West Virginia State College, he discovered science fiction, including the juvenile novels of Robert A. Heinlein and the pulp magazines Amazing and Fantastic. In 1950 he bought his first copy of Astounding, of which he collected virtually all issues until the death of the editor John W. Campbell, in 1971. It was at this time that Meredith wrote his first short stories. He had no thought of becoming a full-time author; Meredith wanted to be an astronomer — an ambition he followed until he realized that he did not have the mathematical aptitude necessary for a career in astronomy.

=== Army life ===
Meredith's parents moved to Pensacola, Florida in 1956 in pursuit of improved economic and financial opportunities. Meredith followed soon after and, disillusioned at the lack of jobs available to him (he had not finished college), he decided to enlist in the U.S. Army. There he received extensive training in microwave radio theory and practice before becoming a microwave systems technician and later an instructor in microwave radio theory and the electronics aspects of aircraft navigation and communication. This experience might have influenced the plot of his later novel We All Died at Breakaway Station, which is focused on the communications technology of a future space culture and on the extreme sacrifice made by a space navy's technicians in order to maintain interstellar communications and let a vital message get through.

Meredith married his high school sweetheart during this period, but the marriage did not last long and ended in divorce.

After leaving the Army in 1960, Meredith returned to his family in Pensacola and enrolled at Pensacola Junior College. However, his studies were cut short again, this time when he was recalled to the U.S. Army in 1961 due to the Berlin Crisis and escalating tensions between the United States and the U.S.S.R. Meredith served with a helicopter rescue unit in the Mississippi National Guard but did not see action.

=== Marriage and children ===
After his final release from the Army in 1962, Meredith found employment at Grice Electronics Inc in Pensacola, an electronics wholesale and retail company, where he rose to become advertising manager and met a girl from Alabama named Joy Gates. They married in 1963 and in 1965 Joy gave birth to a daughter, Kira Chimene. The family would grow further with the birth of three sons: Jefferson Conan, Derek Carlton, and Rand Calvin.

Meredith developed his writing during his time in the Army and began to submit short stories to some of the men's magazines that had appeared in imitation of Playboy. Accounts differ as to when the first stories were published but it was almost certainly between 1960 and 1962, the earliest reported being an American Civil War-based story ("The Renegades") in the April 1962 issue of Sir Knight magazine. After the birth of his daughter, Meredith began to write with the intention of selling stories to the science fiction magazines. Numerous rejection slips followed until he was taken on by the Scott Meredith Literary Agency and then began to get short stories accepted for publication.

=== The Author ===
"Choice of Weapons" appeared in the March 1966 issue of Worlds of Tomorrow and more stories were published over the next two years as Meredith refined his writing style. Meredith's novella We All Died at Breakaway Station was published in the January and March 1969 issues of Amazing Stories. This appears to have drawn the attention of Ballantine Books, because later in the year they published Meredith's first novels: The Sky is Filled with Ships and a revised and expanded version of We All Died at Breakaway Station.

Meredith attended DeepSouthCon 8 in Atlanta, Georgia in 1970, a science fiction convention also known as "Agacon '70". During the convention he was awarded the first Phoenix Award for professional contributions to southern science fiction fandom.

=== Later life ===
1970 brought change in Meredith's life. He returned to education, first at Pensacola Junior College and later at the University of West Florida where he studied for a degree in English. Despite supporting his family by undertaking freelance writing and art-and-graphic design to supplement his "G.I. Bill" pension, Meredith had to drop out in 1972 to take a full-time job at the Press Gazette in nearby Milton. There, as production supervisor, he was responsible for editorial page cartoons, a regular human interest column and graphic design, as well as supervising the overall production of the newspaper.

Meredith's first hardcover novel At the Narrow Passage was published in 1973 by G.P. Putnam's Sons. This was followed by the publication of No Brother, No Friend (1976) and Vestiges of Time (1978) by Doubleday. The three novels are commonly referred to as The Timeliner Trilogy, but this series title was not applied until the books were reprinted in revised form by Playboy Press in 1979. Also notable from this period was the publication by Ballantine Books of Meredith's time travel novel Run, Come See Jerusalem! (1976).

Meredith underwent spinal surgery in the Fall of 1974 and did not return to work until January 1975 when he helped to found the Santa Rosa Free Press and served as editor. "Creative differences" with the publisher and the accidental drowning of his son Jeff in July 1975 led Meredith to take a brief sabbatical during which he returned to West Virginia. There he considered his future and worked on various writing projects including Run, Come See Jerusalem! and No Brother, No Friend, which he dedicated to his son.

Returning to Florida, Meredith spent some time working as a copy editor for the National Enquirer before deciding to work entirely on a freelance basis undertaking writing, illustration and graphic design work. Beyond science fiction, Meredith's interests included painting, drawing and history. He also wrote poetry and privately published a volume of erotic poetry.

=== Death and afterward ===
Meredith died unexpectedly on 8 March 1979, aged only 41, following a stroke brought on by a brain hemorrhage.

Prior to his death, St. Martin's Press had accepted Meredith's novel The Awakening for publication. The book, issued in June 1979, was a departure from Meredith's usual fare: it was a ghost story. The narrative runs along two timelines, one set during the American Civil War, while the other is set in 1970s Virginia, where the lead character shares a surprising number of parallels with Meredith himself. Meredith had also completed revisions to the three volumes of The Timeliner Trilogy to resolve some errors and inconsistencies in the storyline. Playboy Press published the trilogy in paperback over three months beginning in September 1979.

Meredith's science fiction novels were reprinted by Hamlyn/Arrow Books between 1985 and 1988, but have since fallen out of print. Filmmaker Robert H. Gwinn has announced plans to reprint the books as part of a promotional campaign supporting a film adaption of The Timeliner Trilogy.

== Published works ==
=== The Timeliner Trilogy ===
- At the Narrow Passage (1973, G.P. Putnam's Sons, New York; revised 1979, Playboy Press, Chicago)
- No Brother, No Friend (1976, Doubleday & Company, New York; revised 1979, Playboy Press, Chicago)
- Vestiges of Time (1978, Doubleday & Company, New York; revised 1979, Playboy Press, Chicago)
  - The Timeliner Trilogy (1987, Arrow Books, London, omnibus)

=== Other novels ===
- The Sky is Filled with Ships (1969, Ballantine Books, New York)
- We All Died at Breakaway Station (1969, Ballantine Books, New York; a shorter version had been serialized in Amazing Stories)
- Run, Come See Jerusalem! (1976, Ballantine Books, New York)
- The Awakening (1979, St. Martin's Press, New York)

=== Novellas, novelettes and short stories ===
- "The Renegades" (Sir Knight, April 1962, v.3, n.4)
- "The Slugs" (Knight, November 1962, v.3, n.10)
- "Choice of Weapons" (Worlds of Tomorrow, March 1966, v.3, n.6, #18)
- "To the War is Gone" (Worlds of Tomorrow, November 1966, v.4, n.2, #21)
- "The Fifth Columbiad" (Worlds of Tomorrow, February 1967, v.4, n.3, #22)
- "The Longest Voyage" (Fantastic, September 1967, v.17, n.1)
- "We All Died at Breakaway Station" (Amazing, January & March 1969, v.42, n.5 & 6, serial; an expanded version was subsequently published by Ballantine Books)
- "Hired Man" (If, February 1970, v.20, n.2, #14)
- "Earthcoming" (The Future Is Now, ed. William F. Nolan, 1970, Sherbourne Press, Los Angeles)
- "Time of the Sending" (If, November–December 1971, v.21, n.2, #157)
- "Cold the Stars are, Cold the Earth" (Amazing, August 1978, v.51, n.4)

=== Essays ===
- "An Autobiographical Sketch; August 6, 1975" (Starship, Summer 1979, v.16, n.3, #35)
