= Jana Oliver =

American author

Jana G. Oliver is an American author whose stories are set in a number of genres, including romance, urban fantasy, science fiction, mystery, and historical mystery. An Iowa native, she currently lives in Portugal.

Her Time Rovers Series was originally published by Dragon Moon Press, a Canadian speculative fiction publisher. The series was nominated for fifteen awards and won twelve, including ForeWord Magazine's Editor's Choice Book of the Year, the first time a science fiction novel received that honor.

In 2009, Oliver was signed by St. Martin's Press to write the Demon Trappers Series, a young adult urban fantasy series. The series originally consisted of four books and was translated into German, French, Brazilian, Russian, Turkish, Danish and Mandarin. Five more books have been added to the series since 2012.

Oliver also wrote a romantic suspense/thriller series (Veritas Series) under the pseudonym (Chandler Steele).

== Published works ==
=== Time Rovers® Series ===
- Sojourn
- Virtual Evil
- Madman's Dance

=== Demon Trappers® Series ===
- Forsaken - Demon Trappers #1 (Originally titled The Demon Trapper's Daughter)
- Forbidden - Demon Trappers #2 (Originally titled Soul Thief)
- Forgiven - Demon Trappers #3
- Foretold - Demon Trappers #4
- Grave Matters - Demon Trappers #5
- Mind Games - Demon Trappers #6
- Valiant Light - Demon Trappers #7
- Lost Souls - Demon Trappers #8
- Bitter Magic - Demon Trappers #9

=== DragonFire Series ===
- Circle of the Swan
- Summoning Stone

=== Veritas Series ===
- Cat's Paw (writing as Chandler Steele)
- Killing Game (writing as Chandler Steele)
- Broken Dreams (writing as Chandler Steele)

=== Standalone Novels ===
- Tangled Souls
- Dead Easy
- Briar Rose (Macmillan Children's Books)

== Anthologies ==
- The Ladies of Trade Town (THE LAST VIRGIN) (HarpHaven Publishing)
- You Want Stories? The JordanCon 2019 Anthology (JordanCon)

== Non-fiction ==
- Socially Engaged: The Author's Guide to Social Media (with Tyra Burton)
- The Complete Guide to Writing Fantasy: Vol. 3 Anthology (Dragon Moon Press)
- Nyx in the House of Night (BY THEIR MARKS YOU SHALL KNOW THEM) (BenBella Books)

== Awards received ==
- Bookseller's Best -- (Sojourn)
- Daphne du Maurier Award for Excellence in Mystery/Suspense-- (Sojourn)
- Desert Rose Golden Quill -- (Sojourn)
- ForeWord Magazine Editor's Choice Book of the Year -- (Sojourn)
- ForeWord Award Science Fiction -- (Virtual Evil)
- Independent Publisher Award Gold Medal -- (Sojourn)
- Independent Publisher Award Gold Medal -- (Virtual Evil)
- Independent Publisher Award Silver Medal -- (Madman's Dance)
- Maggie Award of Excellence -- (The Demon Trapper's Daughter)
- Maggie Award of Excellence -- (Mind Games)
- Moerser Jugendbuch Jury Book of the Year 2011-2012 -- (Aller Anfang ist Hölle)
- National Reader's Choice Award -- (Forgiven)
- Pluto Award -- (Sojourn)
- Pluto Award -- (Virtual Evil)
- Phoenix Lifetime Achievement Award (DeepSouthCon 54)
- Prism Award for Time Travel -- (Sojourn)
- Prism Award -- (Soul Thief)
