= National Fantasy Fan Federation =

The National Fantasy Fan Federation (N3F or NFFF) is one of the world's oldest science fiction fandom organizations. The organization was founded in April 1941 when all science fiction, horror, and fantasy literature was lumped into one category called "fantasy." The group actively encourages the development of writers, editors, and artists.

== History ==
The group was founded by a loose cadre of members of Boston, Massachusetts-based Stranger Club who were inspired by the Damon Knight article Unite - or Fie! published in that month's Fanfare. Knight said the withering of "New Fandom" should be counteracted by the creation of a general-purpose organization to link avid readers of all forms of speculative fiction. The club still exists today and continues to reach many of its members by regular mail, though it now has a growing online presence with its Web site and related mailing lists via the Internet.

== Organization and Services ==
The N3F has a president, treasurer, secretary and directorate which handles the day-to-day operation of the club's business. The president and directorate are elected by the membership.

The club's activities revolve mainly around its bureaus, which are headed by club members who volunteer for the positions and are appointed by the president. Bureaus can consist of one to more than one person, depending on the level of participation by club members. Current bureaus include art, computer gaming, correspondence, welcommittee, Mangaverse, teaching SF, Future Fandom, Writer's Exchange and an amateur press alliance.

Perhaps the heart of the N3F's bureau activities are the round robins (RRs), which are conducted by both regular mail and e-mail. RRs, as they are called, are groups of members with interest in a specific topic (a particular writer, or a subject such as comics, cats in SF, dragons, horror, Star Trek, time travel, etc.). Each RR has a Robin Master, who starts the group with sending a letter or e-mail to one of the other members; that person adds their contribution and sends both items on to the next person in the group. Each time the packet returns to a member, they remove their previous contribution and insert a new one, often containing responses to what other RR members have written. This is one of the club's oldest and longest-lasting activities, because it allows members to comment on topics of their interest without requiring them to travel or meet others in person.

== Notable N3F members and former members ==
- Art Widner
- Forrest J Ackerman
- Piers Anthony
- Marion Zimmer Bradley
- Howard DeVore
- Damon Knight
- Jacqueline Lichtenberg
- Russ Manning
- Sam Moskowitz
- Jack Speer
- Donald A. Wollheim
- Ray Bradbury
