= DeepSouthCon =

Annual science fiction convention

- Status: Active
- Genre: Science Fiction/Fantasy
- Location: Dallas, Texas in 2026
- Country: United States
- Inaugurated: 1963
- Attendance: ~1200 (average)
- Filing status: Non-Profit
- Website: http://www.deepsouthcon.org/

The DeepSouthCon (DSC) is an annual science fiction convention, which is hosted in different cities in the Southern United States. Site selection is by vote of the membership of a given DSC, for the convention to be held two years in the future. DSC is often, but not always, held in conjunction with an existing annual convention so the time of year varies. Many regular attendees of DeepSouthCon are also members of the Southern Fandom Confederation, but there is no direct relationship between the two organizations.

DeepSouthCon 64, 2026, was held in Dallas in February.

== Awards ==
DSC issues two principal awards: the Phoenix, which is awarded to a science fiction professional editor, author, or artist with connections to the South, and the Rebel, which is awarded to a like-placed fan. The Phoenix and Rebel awards are considered lifetime achievement awards for a professional or fan who has done the most for southern fandom.

The 2013 DeepSouthCon, JordanCon in Atlanta, Georgia, awarded the Phoenix to Robert Jordan (posthumously), and the Rebel to Regina Kirby and Mike Lee Rogers. Jordan's award was accepted by his wife, Harriet McDougal. The 2014 DeepSouthCon, Contrails in Bristol, Virginia, awarded the Phoenix to Steve Jackson, and the Rebel to Judy Bemis. The 2015 DeepSouthCon, CONtraflow V in New Orleans, Louisiana, awarded the Phoenix to Diana Rowland and (posthumously) Robert Asprin with the Rebel awarded to Michael Scott and Frank Schiavo.

A Rubble award to the person who has done the most to southern fandom in the past year is also awarded at the DeepSouthCon, usually good-naturedly. The Rubble is not an officially-sponsored convention award.

== Locations ==
=== Early ===
The first DeepSouthCon was held in 1963 in Huntsville, Alabama, and had a total attendance of five people. In 1965, attendance had grown to 19 people and the very first Rebel Award was presented to co-chair Al Andrews. In 1970, at the Agacon DSC in Atlanta, Georgia, the first Phoenix Award was presented to Richard C. Meredith, and the convention broke the 100 mark in attendance with 130 members. The largest DeepSouthCon was ConCarolinas 2010 in Charlotte, North Carolina, with a total attendance over 1,300 people.

=== Recent ===
Recent DeepSouthCons include DSC51, held in April 2013 in conjunction with JordanCon V in Atlanta, Georgia, with special guests Michael Whelan and Seanan McGuire and DSC52 held as a stand-alone event named Contrails in Bristol, Virginia, in May 2014 with Guest of Honor Gordon Van Gelder and Fan Guests of Honor Pat Molloy, Grace Molloy, and Naomi Fisher. Attendance at DSC52 was reported as "60 people and 1 dog". DSC53 was held in conjunction with CONtraflow V in New Orleans, Louisiana, on October 2–4, 2015.

=== Upcoming ===
DSC54 was held in conjunction with JordanCon 8 in Atlanta, Georgia, on April 22-24, 2016. This replaced a previously announced stand-alone Atlanta-based DSC known as "ABC DSC" that suffered financial and other issues and collapsed in Summer 2015. The announced guests of honor are author Catherine Asaro and artist John Picacio.

DSC 55 was held in conjunction with ConGregate in High Point, North Carolina, in July 2017. The winning bid won over a bid for Concave XXXVIII in Bowling Green, Kentucky.

DSC60 was again held in Huntsville AL on October 21-23 2022. DSC61 was held on June 23 - 25 in conjunction with LibertyCon 35 in Chattanooga, TN.

== Guests ==
Over the years, guests and award winners of the DeepSouthCon have included Sam Moskowitz, Poul Anderson, Hal Clement, Philip José Farmer, L. Sprague de Camp, Jack Williamson, R.A. Lafferty, Stephen King, Marion Zimmer Bradley, Robert Bloch, Gregory Benford, Orson Scott Card, Forrest J. Ackerman, Mercedes Lackey, Lois McMaster Bujold, Mike Resnick, Larry Elmore, Harry Turtledove, James P. Hogan, Steve Jackson, George Alec Effinger, Barbara Hambly, Vincent Di Fate, John Ringo, David Drake, Jerry Pournelle, Albin Johnson, Brad W. Foster, Selina Rosen, and dozens more.
