= Dragon Moon Press =

American independent publishing company

Dragon Moon Press is an American independent publishing company, specializing in science fiction, fantasy, dark fantasy and cross-genre novels. It was founded in 1993 by Gwen Gades, and released its first book in 1998.

The company has published work by, among others, Scott Sigler, Stewart Bint, Tee Morris, Philippa Ballantine, Dane Cobain, Chico Kidd and Jana Oliver, and has a history of printing the work of podcast novelists.

== Awards and recognition ==
Dragon Moon Press novels have been finalists for literary awards including the Sir Julius Vogel Award, the Bram Stoker Award and the Foreword Book of the Year Awards (now known as the Foreword INDIES).

In 2006, Sojourn by Jana Oliver became the first fantasy/science fiction book to win ForeWord's Book of the Year Editor's Choice Award.

In 2009, Dragon Moon Press titles won the ForeWord Book of the Year Gold (Scimitar Moon by Chris A. Jackson) and Bronze medals (Nina Kimberly the Merciless by Christiana Ellis) for Science Fiction/Fantasy.
