= List of Worldcons by city =

This World Science Fiction Convention (Worldcon) list includes prior and scheduled Worldcons, sorted by major city. The data is maintained by the Long List Committee, a World Science Fiction Society sub-committee.

Metropolitan Area	City	Country	Year
Atlanta	Atlanta	United States	1986
Baltimore	Baltimore	United States	1983 1998
Greater Boston	Boston	United States	1971 1980 1989 2004
Brighton and Hove	Brighton	United Kingdom	1979 1987
Sichuan	Chengdu	China	2023
Chicago	Chicago	United States	1940 1952 1962 1982 1991 2000 2012 2022
Cincinnati	Cincinnati	United States	1949
Greater Cleveland	Cleveland	United States	1955 1966
Denver-Aurora-Lakewood	Denver	United States	1941 1981 2008
Metro Detroit	Detroit	United States	1959
Dublin	Dublin	Ireland	2019
Greater Glasgow	Glasgow	United Kingdom	1995 2005 2024
The Hague	The Hague	Netherlands	1990
Rhine-Neckar	Heidelberg	Germany	1970
Greater Helsinki	Helsinki	Finland	2017
Kansas City	Kansas City	United States	1976 2016
Greater London	London	United Kingdom	1957 1965 2014
Greater Los Angeles	Los Angeles	United States	1946 1958
Greater Los Angeles	Anaheim	United States	1972 1984 1996 2006 2026
Melbourne	Melbourne	Australia	1975 1985 1999 2010
Miami	Miami Beach	United States	1977
Greater Montreal	Montreal	Canada	2009
New Orleans	New Orleans	United States	1951 1988
New York	New York City	United States	1939 1956 1967
Greater Orlando	Orlando	United States	1992
Delaware Valley	Philadelphia	United States	1947 1953 2001
Phoenix	Phoenix	United States	1978
Pittsburgh	Pittsburgh	United States	1960
Portland	Portland	United States	1950
Reno–Sparks	Reno	United States	2011
Greater San Antonio	San Antonio	United States	1997 2013
San Francisco Bay Area	San Francisco	United States	1954 1993
San Francisco Bay Area	Oakland	United States	1964
San Francisco Bay Area	Berkeley	United States	1968
San Francisco Bay Area	San Jose	United States	2002 2018
Seattle	Seattle	United States	1961 2025
Greater St. Louis	St. Louis	United States	1969
Spokane	Spokane	United States	2015
Greater Toronto Area	Toronto	Canada	1948 1973 2003
Washington	Washington	United States	1963 1974 2021
Wellington Region	Wellington	New Zealand	2020
Winnipeg Capital Region	Winnipeg	Canada	1994
Greater Tokyo Area	Yokohama	Japan	2007
