= The Hugo Winners =

Series of anthologies edited by Isaac Asimov

- First edition
- Editor: Isaac Asimov
- Language: English
- Genre: Science fiction
- Publisher: Doubleday
- Publication date: 1962, 1971, 1977, 1985, and 1986.
- Publication place: United States
- Media type: Print (hardback)
- Pages: 318
- Followed by: The New Hugo Winners

The Hugo Winners was a series of books which collected science fiction and fantasy stories that won a Hugo Award for Short Story, Novelette or Novella at the World Science Fiction Convention between 1955 and 1982. Each volume was edited by American writer Isaac Asimov, who wrote the introduction and a short essay about each author featured in the book. Through these essays, Asimov shared personal anecdotes, revealing the authors he was jealous of, and how other writers winning awards ahead of him made him angry. Additionally, he discussed his political beliefs (he supported the ending of the Vietnam War, while Poul Anderson didn't), friendships, and his affinity for writers of "hard science fiction". The first two volumes were collected by Doubleday into a single book, which lacks a publishing date and ISBN.

The Hugo Winners was followed by The New Hugo Winners, which collected Hugo Award-winning stories from 1983 to 1994.

== Volume 1 ==
It was first published by Doubleday in 1962.

- 1955: 13th Convention, Cleveland
  - "The Darfsteller" by Walter M. Miller, Jr. (novelette)
  - "Allamagoosa" by Eric Frank Russell (short story)
- 1956: 14th Convention, New York
  - "Exploration Team" By Murray Leinster (novelette)
  - "The Star" by Arthur C. Clarke (short story)
- 1958: 16th Convention, Los Angeles
  - "Or All the Seas with Oysters" by Avram Davidson (short story)
- 1959: 17th Convention, Detroit
  - "The Big Front Yard" By Clifford D. Simak (novelette)
  - "That Hell-Bound Train" by Robert Bloch (short story)
- 1960: 18th Convention, Pittsburgh
  - "Flowers for Algernon" by Daniel Keyes (short story)
- 1961: 19th Convention, Seattle
  - "The Longest Voyage" by Poul Anderson (short story)

=== Reception ===
Floyd C. Gale of Galaxy Science Fiction rated the collection five stars out of five, stating that "This is a sure-fire collection of Can't Misses".

== Volume 2 ==
It was first published in 1971 by Doubleday.

- 1963: 21st Convention, Washington
  - "The Dragon Masters" by Jack Vance (short story)
- 1964: 22nd Convention, San Francisco (Oakland)
  - "No Truce With Kings" by Poul Anderson (short story)
- 1965: 23rd Convention, London
  - "Soldier, Ask Not" by Gordon R. Dickson (short story)
- 1966: 24th Convention, Cleveland
  - ""Repent, Harlequin!" Said the Ticktockman" by Harlan Ellison (short story)
- 1967: 25th Convention, New York
  - "The Last Castle" by Jack Vance (novelette)
  - "Neutron Star" by Larry Niven (short story)
- 1968: 26th Convention, San Francisco (Oakland)
  - "Weyr Search" by Anne McCaffrey (novella)
  - "Riders of the Purple Wage" by Philip José Farmer (novella)
  - "Gonna Roll the Bones" by Fritz Leiber (novelette)
  - "I Have No Mouth, and I Must Scream" by Harlan Ellison (short story)
- 1969: 27th Convention, St. Louis
  - Nightwings by Robert Silverberg (novella)
  - "The Sharing of Flesh" by Poul Anderson (novelette)
  - "The Beast That Shouted Love at the Heart of the World" by Harlan Ellison (short story)
- 1970: 28th Convention, Heidelberg
  - "Time Considered as a Helix of Semi-Precious Stones" by Samuel R. Delany (short story)

== Volume 3 ==
It was first published by Doubleday in 1977.

- 1970: 28th Convention, Heidelberg
  - "Ship of Shadows" by Fritz Leiber (novella)
- 1971: 29th Convention, Boston
  - "Ill Met in Lankhmar" by Fritz Leiber (novella)
  - "Slow Sculpture" by Theodore Sturgeon (short story)
- 1972: 30th Convention, Los Angeles
  - "The Queen of Air and Darkness" by Poul Anderson (novella)
  - "Inconstant Moon" by Larry Niven (short story)
- 1973: 31st Convention, Toronto
  - "The Word for World Is Forest" by Ursula K. Le Guin (novella)
  - "Goat Song" by Poul Anderson (novelette)
  - "The Meeting" by Frederik Pohl and C. M. Kornbluth (short story, tie)
  - "Eurema's Dam" by R. A. Lafferty (short story, tie)
- 1974: 32nd Convention, Washington
  - "The Girl Who Was Plugged In" by James Tiptree, Jr. (novella)
  - "The Deathbird" by Harlan Ellison (novelette)
  - "The Ones Who Walk Away from Omelas" by Ursula K. Le Guin (short story)
- 1975: 33rd Convention, Melbourne
  - "A Song for Lya" by George R. R. Martin (novella)
  - "Adrift Just Off the Islets of Langerhans: Latitude 38° 54' N, Longitude 77° 00' 13" W" by Harlan Ellison (novelette)
  - "The Hole Man" by Larry Niven (short story)

== Volume 4 ==
Volume 4 was edited by Isaac Asimov and first published in 1985.

- 1976: 34th Convention, Kansas City
  - "Home Is the Hangman" by Roger Zelazny (novella)
  - "The Borderland of Sol" by Larry Niven (novelette)
  - "Catch That Zeppelin!" by Fritz Leiber (short story)
- 1977: 35th Convention, Miami Beach
  - "By Any Other Name" by Spider Robinson (novella, tie)
  - "Houston, Houston, Do You Read?" by James Tiptree, Jr. (novella, tie)
  - "The Bicentennial Man" by Isaac Asimov (novelette)
  - "Tricentennial" by Joe Haldeman (short story)
- 1978: 36th Convention, Phoenix
  - "Stardance" by Spider Robinson and Jeanne Robinson (novella)
  - "Eyes of Amber" by Joan D. Vinge (novelette)
  - "Jeffty is Five" by Harlan Ellison (short story)
- 1979: 37th Convention, Brighton, England
  - "The Persistence of Vision" by John Varley (novella)
  - "Hunter's Moon" by Poul Anderson (novelette)
  - "Cassandra" by C. J. Cherryh (short story)

== Volume 5 ==
It was first published by Doubleday in 1986.

- 1980: 38th Convention, Boston
  - "Enemy Mine" by Barry B. Longyear (novella)
  - "Sandkings" by George R. R. Martin (novelette)
  - "The Way of Cross and Dragon" by George R. R. Martin (short story)
- 1981: 39th Convention, Denver
  - "Lost Dorsai" by Gordon R. Dickson (novella)
  - "The Cloak and the Staff" by Gordon R. Dickson (novelette)
  - "Grotto of the Dancing Deer" by Clifford D. Simak (short story)
- 1982: 40th Convention, Chicago
  - "The Saturn Game" by Poul Anderson (novella)
  - "Unicorn Variation" by Roger Zelazny (novelette)
  - "The Pusher" by John Varley (short story)

== Sources ==
- Tuck, Donald H. (1974). The Encyclopedia of Science Fiction and Fantasy. Chicago: Advent. p. 23. ISBN 0-911682-20-1.
