= The New Hugo Winners =

Series of anthologies of Hugo Award winning stories

The New Hugo Winners was a series of books which collected science fiction and fantasy short-form works that had recently won a Hugo Award for best Short Story, Novelette or Novella. Published by Baen Books, the series succeeded Doubleday's The Hugo Winners following that series' discontinuation after volume five. The New Hugo Winners ran for four volumes, published in 1989, 1992, 1994, and 1997, together collecting stories that had won the award from 1983 to 1994. The first two volumes were edited by Isaac Asimov. Due to Asimov's death in April 1992, the third volume was edited by Connie Willis and the fourth by Greg Benford.

== Volume I ==
Volume I was edited by Isaac Asimov and first published in 1989.

- 1983: 41st Convention, Baltimore
  - "Souls", by Joanna Russ (novella)
  - "Fire Watch", by Connie Willis (novelette)
  - "Melancholy Elephants", by Spider Robinson (short story)
- 1984: 42nd Convention, Anaheim
  - "Cascade Point", by Timothy Zahn (novella)
  - "Blood Music", by Greg Bear (novelette)
  - "Speech Sounds", by Octavia E. Butler (short story)
- 1985: 43rd Convention, Melbourne
  - "Press Enter", by John Varley (novella)
  - "Bloodchild", by Octavia E. Butler (novelette)
  - "The Crystal Spheres", by David Brin (short story)

== Volume II ==
Volume II was edited by Isaac Asimov and first published in 1992.

- 1986: 44th Convention, Atlanta
  - "24 Views of Mt. Fuji, by Hokusai", by Roger Zelazny (novella)
  - "Paladin of the Lost Hour", by Harlan Ellison (novelette)
  - "Fermi and Frost", by Frederik Pohl (short story)
- 1987: 45th Convention, Brighton
  - "Gilgamesh in the Outback", by Robert Silverberg (novella)
  - "Permafrost", by Roger Zelazny (novelette)
  - "Tangents", by Greg Bear (short story)
- 1988: 46th Convention, New Orleans
  - "Eye for Eye", by Orson Scott Card (novella)
  - "Buffalo Gals, Won't You Come Out Tonight", by Ursula K. Le Guin (novelette)
  - "Why I Left Harry's All-Night Hamburgers", by Lawrence Watt-Evans (short story)

== Volume III ==
Volume III was edited by Connie Willis and first published in 1994. Its original printing included cover art by Bob Eggleton.

- 1989: 47th Convention, Boston
  - "Kirinyaga", by Mike Resnick (short story)
  - "Schrödinger's Kitten", by George Alec Effinger (novelette)
  - "The Last of the Winnebagos", by Connie Willis (novella)
- 1990: 48th Convention, The Hague, Netherlands
  - "Boobs", by Suzy McKee Charnas (short story)
  - "Enter a Soldier. Later: Enter Another", by Robert Silverberg (novelette)
  - "The Mountains of Mourning", by Lois McMaster Bujold (novella)
- 1991: 49th Convention, Chicago
  - "Bears Discover Fire", by Terry Bisson (short story)
  - "The Manamouki", by Mike Resnick (novelette)
  - "The Hemingway Hoax", by Joe Haldeman (novella)

== Volume IV ==
Volume IV was edited by Greg Benford and first published in 1997.

- 1992: 50th Convention, Orlando
  - "A Walk in the Sun", by Geoffrey Landis (short story)
  - "Gold", by Isaac Asimov (novelette)
  - "Beggars in Spain", by Nancy Kress (novella)
- 1993: 51st Convention, San Francisco
  - "Even the Queen", by Connie Willis (short story)
  - "The Nutcracker Coup", by Janet Kagan (novelette)
  - "Barnacle Bill the Spacer", by Lucius Shepard (novella)
- 1994: 52nd Convention, Winnipeg
  - "Death on the Nile", by Connie Willis (short story)
  - "Georgia on My Mind", by Charles Sheffield (novelette)
  - "Down in the Bottomlands", by Harry Turtledove (novella)

== See also ==
- Worldcon
