= Nolacon =

Nolacon may refer to:

- Nolacon I, the 9th World Science Fiction Convention, 1951
- Nolacon II, the 46th World Science Fiction Convention, 1988
- NolaCon (infosec conference), information security conference held annually since 2014
