= List of Worldcons =

This World Science Fiction Convention (Worldcon) list includes prior and scheduled Worldcons. The information is maintained by the Long List Committee, a World Science Fiction Society sub-committee.

List of World Science Fiction Conventions
| | Year | Name | City | Country | Guests of honor | Size |
|---|---|---|---|---|---|---|
| 1st | 1939 | Nycon I | New York, New York | US | Frank R. Paul | 200 |
| 2nd | 1940 | Chicon I | Chicago, Illinois | US | E. E. "Doc" Smith | 128 |
| 3rd | 1941 | Denvention I | Denver, Colorado | US | Robert A. Heinlein | 90 |
| 4th | 1946 | Pacificon I | Los Angeles, California | US | A. E. van Vogt; E. Mayne Hull | 130 |
| 5th | 1947 | Philcon I | Philadelphia, Pennsylvania | US | John W. Campbell, Jr. | 200 |
| 6th | 1948 | Torcon I | Toronto, Ontario | Canada | Robert Bloch (pro); Bob Tucker (fan) | 200 |
| 7th | 1949 | Cinvention | Cincinnati, Ohio | US | Lloyd A. Eshbach (pro); Ted Carnell (fan) | 190 |
| 8th | 1950 | Norwescon | Portland, Oregon | US | Anthony Boucher | 400 |
| 9th | 1951 | Nolacon I | New Orleans, Louisiana | US | Fritz Leiber | 190 |
| 10th | 1952 | TASFiC (Chicon II) | Chicago, Illinois | US | Hugo Gernsback | 870 (1,175) |
| 11th | 1953 | Philcon II | Philadelphia, Pennsylvania | US | Willy Ley | 839 |
| 12th | 1954 | SFCon | San Francisco, California | US | John W. Campbell, Jr. | 700 |
| 13th | 1955 | Clevention | Cleveland, Ohio | US | Isaac Asimov (pro); Sam Moskowitz (mystery GoH) | 380 |
| 14th | 1956 | NyCon II | New York, New York | US | Arthur C. Clarke | 850 |
| 15th | 1957 | Loncon I | London | UK | John W. Campbell, Jr. | 268 |
| 16th | 1958 | Solacon | South Gate, California | US | Richard Matheson | 322 (601) |
| 17th | 1959 | Detention | Detroit, Michigan | US | Poul Anderson (pro); John Berry (fan) | 371 |
| 18th | 1960 | Pittcon | Pittsburgh, Pennsylvania | US | James Blish | 568 |
| 19th | 1961 | Seacon | Seattle, Washington | US | Robert A. Heinlein | 300 |
| 20th | 1962 | Chicon III | Chicago, Illinois | US | Theodore Sturgeon | 730 (830) |
| 21st | 1963 | Discon I | Washington, D.C. | US | Murray Leinster | 600 |
| 22nd | 1964 | Pacificon II | Oakland, California | US | Leigh Brackett (pro); Edmond Hamilton (pro); Forrest J Ackerman (fan) | 523 |
| 23rd | 1965 | Loncon II | London | UK | Brian W. Aldiss | 350 |
| 24th | 1966 | Tricon | Cleveland, Ohio | US | L. Sprague de Camp | 850 |
| 25th | 1967 | Nycon 3 | New York, New York | US | Lester del Rey (pro); Bob Tucker (fan) | 1,500 |
| 26th | 1968 | Baycon | Berkeley, California | US | Philip José Farmer (pro); Walter J. Daugherty (fan) | 1,430 (1,841) |
| 27th | 1969 | St. Louiscon | St. Louis, Missouri | US | Jack Gaughan (pro); Eddie Jones (fan) | 1,534 |
| 28th | 1970 | Heicon '70 | Heidelberg | West Germany | E. C. Tubb (UK); Robert Silverberg (US); Herbert W. Franke (Germany); Elliot K. Shorter (fan) | 620 |
| 29th | 1971 | Noreascon I | Boston, Massachusetts | US | Clifford D. Simak (pro); Harry Warner, Jr. (fan) | 1,600 (2,078) |
| 30th | 1972 | L.A.con I | Los Angeles, California | US | Frederik Pohl (pro); Buck & Juanita Coulson (fan) | 2,007 |
| 31st | 1973 | Torcon II | Toronto, Ontario | Canada | Robert Bloch (pro); William Rotsler (fan) | 2,900 |
| 32nd | 1974 | Discon II | Washington, D.C. | US | Roger Zelazny (pro); Jay Kay Klein (fan) | 3,587 |
| 33rd | 1975 | Aussiecon 1 | Melbourne, Victoria | Australia | Ursula K. Le Guin (pro); Susan Wood (fan); Mike Glicksohn (fan); Donald Tuck (Australian) | 606 |
| 34th | 1976 | MidAmeriCon | Kansas City, Missouri | US | Robert A. Heinlein; George Barr (fan) | 3,014 (4,200) |
| 35th | 1977 | SunCon | Miami Beach, Florida | US | Jack Williamson (pro); Robert A. Madle (fan) | 3,240 |
| 36th | 1978 | IguanaCon II | Phoenix, Arizona | US | Harlan Ellison (pro); Bill Bowers (fan) | 4,700 |
| 37th | 1979 | Seacon '79 | Brighton | UK | Brian Aldiss (UK); Fritz Leiber (US); Harry Bell (fan) | 3,114 |
| 38th | 1980 | Noreascon Two | Boston, Massachusetts | US | Damon Knight (pro); Kate Wilhelm (pro); Bruce Pelz (fan) | 5,850 |
| 39th | 1981 | Denvention Two | Denver, Colorado | US | Clifford D. Simak (pro); C.L. Moore (pro); Rusty Hevelin (fan) | 3,725 (4,542) |
| 40th | 1982 | Chicon IV | Chicago, Illinois | US | A. Bertram Chandler (pro); Frank Kelly Freas (pro); Lee Hoffman (fan) | 4,275 |
| 41st | 1983 | ConStellation | Baltimore, Maryland | US | John Brunner (pro); David A. Kyle (fan) | 6,400 |
| 42nd | 1984 | L.A.con II | Anaheim, California | US | Gordon R. Dickson (pro); Dick Eney (fan) | 8,365 (9,282) |
| 43rd | 1985 | Aussiecon Two | Melbourne, Victoria | Australia | Gene Wolfe (pro); Ted White (fan) | 1,599 |
| 44th | 1986 | ConFederation | Atlanta, Georgia | US | Ray Bradbury (pro); Terry Carr (fan) | 5,811 |
| 45th | 1987 | Conspiracy '87 | Brighton | UK | Doris Lessing (UK); Alfred Bester (US); Boris and Arkady Strugatsky (USSR); Jim Burns (artist); Ray Harryhausen (film); Joyce Slater and Ken Slater (fan); David Langford (special fan) | 4,009 (5,425) |
| 46th | 1988 | Nolacon II | New Orleans, Louisiana | US | Donald A. Wollheim (pro); Roger Sims (fan) | 5,300 |
| 47th | 1989 | Noreascon 3 | Boston, Massachusetts | US | Andre Norton (pro); Betty and Ian Ballantine (pro); The Stranger Club (fan) | 6,837 (7,795) |
| 48th | 1990 | ConFiction | The Hague | Netherlands | Harry Harrison (pro); Wolfgang Jeschke (pro); Joe Haldeman (pro); Andrew I. Porter (fan) | 3,580 |
| 49th | 1991 | Chicon V | Chicago, Illinois | US | Hal Clement (pro); Martin H. Greenberg (pro); Richard Powers (pro); Jon and Joni Stopa (fan) | 5,661 |
| 50th | 1992 | MagiCon | Orlando, Florida | US | Jack Vance (pro); Vincent Di Fate (artist); Walter A. Willis (fan) | 5,319 (6,368) |
| 51st | 1993 | ConFrancisco | San Francisco, California | US | Larry Niven; Alicia Austin; Tom Digby (fan); Jan Howard Finder; Mark Twain (Dead GoH) | 6,602 (7,725) |
| 52nd | 1994 | ConAdian | Winnipeg, Manitoba | Canada | Anne McCaffrey (pro); George Barr (artist); Robert Runte (fan) | 3,570 |
| 53rd | 1995 | Intersection | Glasgow, Scotland | UK | Samuel R. Delany (writer); Gerry Anderson (media); Les Edwards (artist); Vin¢ Clarke (fan) | 4,173 (6,524) |
| 54th | 1996 | L.A.con III | Anaheim, California | US | James White (writer); Roger Corman (media); Elsie Wollheim (special); Takumi and Sachiko Shibano (fan) | 6,703 |
| 55th | 1997 | LoneStarCon 2 | San Antonio, Texas | US | Algis Budrys (pro); Michael Moorcock (pro); Don Maitz (artist); Roy Tackett (fan) | 4,634 (5,614) |
| 56th | 1998 | BucConeer | Baltimore, Maryland | US | C. J. Cherryh; Milton A. Rothman; Stanley Schmidt; Michael Whelan; J. Michael Straczynski (special) | 6,572 |
| 57th | 1999 | Aussiecon Three | Melbourne, Victoria | Australia | Gregory Benford, author George Turner, author Bruce Gillespie, fan | 1,548 (2,872) |
| 58th | 2000 | Chicon 2000 | Chicago, Illinois | US | Ben Bova (author); Bob Eggleton (artist); Jim Baen (editor); Bob & Anne Passovoy (fan) | 5,794 (6,574) |
| 59th | 2001 | Millennium Philcon | Philadelphia, Pennsylvania | US | Greg Bear (author); Stephen Youll (artist); Gardner Dozois (editor); George H. Scithers (fan) | 4,840 (6,269) |
| 60th | 2002 | ConJosé | San Jose, California | US | Vernor Vinge (author); David Cherry (artist); Bjo & John Trimble (fan); Ferdinand Feghoot (imaginary) | 5,162 (5,916) |
| 61st | 2003 | Torcon 3 | Toronto, Ontario | Canada | George R. R. Martin (author); Frank Kelly Freas (artist); Mike Glyer (fan); Robert Bloch (GoHst of Honor) | 3,834 (4,986) |
| 62nd | 2004 | Noreascon 4 | Boston, Massachusetts | US | Terry Pratchett (pro); William Tenn (pro); Jack Speer (fan); Peter Weston (fan) | 6,008 (7,485) |
| 63rd | 2005 | Interaction | Glasgow, Scotland | UK | Greg Pickersgill; Christopher Priest; Robert Sheckley; Lars-Olov Strandberg; Jane Yolen | 4,115 (5,202) |
| 64th | 2006 | L.A.con IV | Anaheim, California | US | Connie Willis (Author); James Gurney (Artist); Howard DeVore (fan); Frankie Thomas (Special) | 5,738 (6,291) |
| 65th | 2007 | Nippon 2007 | Yokohama | Japan | Sakyo Komatsu (author); David Brin (author); Takumi Shibano (fan); Yoshitaka Amano (artist); Michael Whelan (artist) | 3,348 (5,149) |
| 66th | 2008 | Denvention 3 | Denver, Colorado | US | Lois McMaster Bujold (pro); Tom Whitmore (fan); Rick Sternbach (artist) | 3,752 (4,854) |
| 67th | 2009 | Anticipation | Montréal, Québec | Canada | Neil Gaiman (pro); Elisabeth Vonarburg (pro); Taral Wayne (fan); David Hartwell (editor); Tom Doherty (publisher) | 3,925 (4,499) |
| 68th | 2010 | Aussiecon Four | Melbourne, Victoria | Australia | Kim Stanley Robinson (author); Robin Johnson (fan); Shaun Tan (artist) | 2,101 (3,462) |
| 69th | 2011 | Renovation | Reno, Nevada | US | Tim Powers; Ellen Asher; Boris Vallejo; Charles N. Brown (in memoriam) | 4,112 (5,526) |
| 70th | 2012 | Chicon 7 | Chicago, Illinois | US | Mike Resnick (author); Rowena Morrill (artist); Story Musgrave (astronaut); Peggy Rae Sapienza (fan); Jane Frank (agent); Sy Liebergot (special guest) | 4,743 (6,197) |
| 71st | 2013 | LoneStarCon 3 | San Antonio, Texas | US | Ellen Datlow; James Gunn; Willie Siros; Norman Spinrad; Darrell K. Sweet (in memoriam); Leslie Fish; Joe R. Lansdale | 4,832 (6,130) |
| 72nd | 2014 | Loncon 3 | London | UK | Iain M. Banks (in memoriam); John Clute; Chris Foss; Malcolm Edwards; Jeanne Gomoll; Robin Hobb; Bryan Talbot | 6,946 (10,718) |
| 73rd | 2015 | Sasquan | Spokane, Washington | US | Brad Foster; David Gerrold; Vonda McIntyre; Tom Smith; Leslie Turek | 5,077 (11,742) |
| 74th | 2016 | MidAmeriCon II | Kansas City, Missouri | US | Kinuko Y. Craft; Patrick Nielsen Hayden; Teresa Nielsen Hayden; Tamora Pierce; Michael Swanwick | 4,719 (7,740) |
| 75th | 2017 | Worldcon 75 | Helsinki | Finland | John-Henri Holmberg; Nalo Hopkinson; Johanna Sinisalo; Claire Wendling; Walter Jon Williams | 5,944 (8,748) |
| 76th | 2018 | Worldcon 76 in San Jose | San Jose, California | US | Spider Robinson; Chelsea Quinn Yarbro; John Picacio; Pierre and Sandy Pettinger; Frank Hayes; Edgar Pangborn; Bob Wilkins | 5,440 (7,812) |
| 77th | 2019 | Dublin 2019 - An Irish Worldcon | Dublin | Ireland | Diane Duane; Ginjer Buchanan; Jocelyn Bell Burnell; Ian McDonald; Steve Jackson; Bill and Mary Burns | 6,525 (8,430) |
| 78th | 2020 | CoNZealand | Wellington | New Zealand | Mercedes Lackey; Larry Dixon; Greg Broadmore; Rose Mitchell | 0 in-person 1,847 virtually (4,624) |
| 79th | 2021 | DisCon III | Washington, D.C. | US | John Harris; Nancy Kress; Malka Older; Sheree Renée Thomas; Ben Yalow | 2,764 in-person 778 virtual (6,416) |
| 80th | 2022 | Chicon 8 | Chicago, Illinois | US | Tananarive Due; Steven Barnes; Edie Stern and Joe Siclari; Erle Korshak | 3,574 in-person 1,150 virtual (6,500) |
| 81st | 2023 | 2023 Chengdu | Chengdu, Sichuan | China | Cixin Liu; Sergey Lukianenko; Robert J. Sawyer | 18,895 in-person >1,105 virtual (>20,000) |
| 82nd | 2024 | Glasgow 2024 | Glasgow, Scotland | UK | Chris Baker; Claire Brialey; Mark Plummer; Ken MacLeod; Nnedi Okorafor; Terri Windling | 7,300 in-person 600 virtual (10,000) |
| 83rd | 2025 | Seattle Worldcon 2025 | Seattle, Washington | US | Martha Wells; Donato Giancola; Bridget Landry; Alexander James Adams | 5,594 in-person 663 virtual (7,739) |
| 84th | 2026 | LAcon V | Anaheim, California | US | Barbara Hambly; Ronald D. Moore; Colleen Doran; Anita Sengupta; Tim Kirk; Geri Sullivan; Stan Sakai | 4,541 in person (8,214) |
| 85th | 2027 | Montréal Worldcon 2027 | Montréal, Québec | Canada | Jo Walton; Yves Meynard; Chris Barkley | TBD |
| 86th | 2028 | AussieCon5 | Brisbane, Queensland | Australia | Seanan McGuire; Perry Middlemiss; Kathleen Jennings; Jonathan Strahan; David Gaider | TBD |

Notes:

- Name – a convention is normally listed by the least confusing version of its name. This is usually the name preferred by the convention, but fannish tradition is followed in retroactively numbering the first Worldcon in a series 1 (or I or One).
- Guests of honor – custom in designating guests of honor has varied greatly, with some conventions giving specific titles (Fan, Pro, Australia, US, Artist, etc.) and some simply calling them all guests of honor. Specific labels have been used where they existed.
- Size – where available, this column records two numbers: how many paying members attended the Worldcon and how many total members there were (in parentheses). The available data is very incomplete and imprecise and many of these numbers are probably substantially in error.
- No Worldcons were held between 1942 and 1945 due to World War II.

== See also ==
- List of Worldcons by city
