= Bjo Trimble =

Science fiction fan

- Born: Betty Jo Conway; August 15, 1933 (age 92); Holdenville, Oklahoma, U.S.
- Occupations: Writer, small business co-owner

Betty JoAnne Trimble (née Conway; born August 15, 1933), known as Bjo (/ˈbiːdʒoʊ/, BEE-joh), is an American science fiction fan and writer, initially entering fandom in the early 1950s.

== Introduction to fandom ==
Trimble's introduction to science fiction fandom was TASFiC, the 1952 Worldcon held in Chicago. She was serving in the United States Navy at Naval Station Great Lakes in North Chicago and happened to see an announcement in Astounding Science Fiction about the upcoming convention that weekend. She met a number of other science fiction enthusiasts, including Robert Bloch, Willy Ley, and August Derleth; and claims that Harlan Ellison, "this bespectacled young man who had just sold his first short story", "decided he liked me and proposed on the spot." (She declined.) When it was discovered that she was an artist and cartoonist, she was recruited to contribute illustrations for science fiction fanzines. Trimble says that she met future husband John Griffin Trimble under Forrest J Ackerman's piano, where several fans had taken refuge during a particularly crowded party. "John was in the Air Force, so he and I traded Stupid Officer Stories and discovered we liked each other a lot."

== Fan activities ==
Trimble helped revive a flagging Los Angeles Science Fiction Society (LASFS) in the late 1950s. In 1958, she put together the "Worldcon Futuristic Fashion Show" at Solacon, the 1958 16th World Science Fiction Convention. She ran once again in 1966 at Tricon, the 24th Worldcon, incidentally giving fandom a glimpse of three early Star Trek costumes. Trimble started and directed "Project Art Show", the first modern convention art show, in 1960. The success of Project Art Show led to art shows becoming a profitable part of most conventions, large and small.

The Trimbles were part of the successful "Save Star Trek" campaign, generally credited with allowing the series to run for a third season rather than being canceled after two. They also helped with the campaign to have the first of NASA's Space Shuttles named Enterprise. Their efforts earned them uncredited roles as a crew members in Star Trek: The Motion Picture, along with a contingent of other members of fandom who were allowed to serve as extras in full costume, portraying crew members (both human and alien) in the Recreation Deck scene (at the time, the largest number of persons ever appearing in a single Star Trek scene). Her other film credits include makeup design for Flesh Gordon; and a role as 'Ma Cant,' a satirical version of Superman's Martha Kent, in a film short called Superbman: The Other Movie.

Trimble contributed to the first encyclopedic collection of data for Star Trek, the Star Trek Concordance, which contains cross-referenced details on every character, setting, event and device in every episode of the original Star Trek, and, in later editions of the book, its animated incarnation and the Star Trek films. The first edition of the book was self-published in 1969, followed by a supplement in 1973 and a mass-market printing in 1976 by Ballantine Books; the work was subsequently updated for a new edition published by Citadel Press in 1995. According to former Trek archivist Richard Arnold, the Concordance was used as a primary source of official canon by writers of the Star Trek Universe when he first started working at Paramount. In 1982, Trimble published a memoir of her experiences in Star Trek fandom entitled On the Good Ship Enterprise: My 15 Years with Star Trek.

In 1974, Trimble was among the first group of winners of the Inkpot Award by Comic-Con International. Trimble received the Big Heart Award in 1964, and (in her persona of Flavia Beatrice Carmigniani) the Society for Creative Anachronism's Order of the Laurel, an art award. Bjo and John are also both members of the SCA's Order of the Pelican for service. (She and John were Baron and Baroness of the SCA's Barony of the Angels [Los Angeles Chapter of the SCA] from September 2008 until January 2012.) She and John also received the International Costumers Guild's Lifetime Achievement award. The Trimbles were celebrity guests at InterCon in Utah, 1976. Trimble was Guest of Honor at 1995's DragonCon, the 6th North American Science Fiction Convention, as well as at many other science fiction and Star Trek conventions around the world. Bjo and John Trimble were the Fan Guests of Honor at the 60th Worldcon, ConJosé.

The Trimbles, who owned and operated the business Griffin Dyeworks & Fiber Arts until 2015, lived in Southern California. In April 2024, it was announced John had died.
