= Chicon (Worldcon) =

Chicon is the name given to seven Worldcons and retroactively applied to an eighth Worldcon. All eight of the conventions were held in Chicago, Illinois.

1. Chicon I, 1940
2. TASFIC (a.k.a. Chicon II), 1952
3. Chicon III (a.k.a. Chicon II, confusingly enough), 1962
4. Chicon IV, 1982
5. Chicon V, 1991
6. Chicon 2000, 2000
7. Chicon 7, 2012
8. Chicon 8, 2022
