= 76th World Science Fiction Convention =

76th Worldcon (2018)

Worldcon 76, the 76th World Science Fiction Convention
- Genre: Science fiction
- Dates: 16–20 August 2018
- Location: San Jose, California
- Country: United States
- Website: worldcon76.org

The 76th World Science Fiction Convention (Worldcon), also known as Worldcon 76 in San Jose, was held 16–20 August 2018 in San Jose, California.

== Participants ==
=== Guests of honor ===
- Chelsea Quinn Yarbro (author)
- Spider Robinson (author)
- John Picacio (artist)
- Frank Hayes (musician)
- Pierre and Sandy Pettinger (fans)

== Awards ==
The World Science Fiction Society administers and presents the Hugo Awards, the oldest and most noteworthy award for science fiction. Selection of the recipients is by vote of the Worldcon members. Categories include novels and short fiction, artwork, dramatic presentations, and various professional and fandom activities.

Other awards may be presented at Worldcon at the discretion of the individual convention committee. This has often included the national SF awards of the host country, such as the Japanese Seiun Awards as part of Nippon 2007, and the Prix Aurora Awards as part of Anticipation in 2009. The Astounding Award for Best New Writer and the Sidewise Award, though not sponsored by the Worldcon, are usually presented, as well as the Chesley Awards, the Prometheus Award, and others. In 2021, the Nommo Awards began presenting at Worldcon.

=== 2018 Hugo Awards ===
The winners were:

- Best Novel: The Stone Sky, by N. K. Jemisin
- Best Novella: All Systems Red, by Martha Wells
- Best Novelette: "The Secret Life of Bots", by Suzanne Palmer
- Best Short Story: "Welcome to your Authentic Indian Experience", by Rebecca Roanhorse
- Best Series: World of the Five Gods, by Lois McMaster Bujold
- Best Related Work: No Time to Spare: Thinking About What Matters, by Ursula K. Le Guin
- Best Graphic Story: Monstress, Volume 2: The Blood, written by Marjorie M. Liu, illustrated by Sana Takeda
- Best Dramatic Presentation, Long Form: Wonder Woman, screenplay by Allan Heinberg, story by Zack Snyder & Allan Heinberg and Jason Fuchs, directed by Patty Jenkins
- Best Dramatic Presentation, Short Form: The Good Place: "The Trolley Problem", written by Josh Siegal and Dylan Morgan, directed by Dean Holland
- Best Professional Editor, Long Form: Sheila E. Gilbert
- Best Professional Editor, Short Form: Lynne M. Thomas & Michael Damian Thomas
- Best Professional Artist: Sana Takeda
- Best Semiprozine: Uncanny Magazine
- Best Fanzine: File 770
- Best Fancast: Ditch Diggers, presented by Mur Lafferty and Matt Wallace
- Best Fan Writer: Sarah Gailey
- Best Fan Artist: Geneva Benton

==== Declined or ineligible ====
The following nominees received enough votes to qualify for the final ballot, but either declined nomination or were found to be ineligible.

- Best Series:
  - Declined
    - The Broken Earth
  - Not enough words published since last appearance in this category. The administrators ruled that the Best Series category presented in 2017 as a special category was effectively the same category as this Best Series category, and therefore the rules for re-eligibility applied.
    - The Expanse
    - The Craft Sequence
    - October Daye
- Best Editor, Long Form: Liz Gorinsky (declined)
- Best Professional Artist: Julie Dillon (declined)
- Best Fancast: Tea and Jeopardy (declined)

=== Other awards ===
The winners were:

- Lodestar Award for Best Young Adult Book: Akata Warrior, by Nnedi Okorafor
- John W. Campbell Award for Best New Writer: Rebecca Roanhorse

== See also ==
- Hugo Award
- Science fiction
- Speculative fiction
- World Science Fiction Society
- Worldcon

| Preceded by 75th World Science Fiction Convention; Worldcon 75 in Helsinki, Finland (2017) | List of Worldcons; 76th World Science Fiction Convention; Worldcon 76 in San Jose, California, United States (2018) | Succeeded by 77th World Science Fiction Convention; Dublin 2019 in Dublin, Ireland (2019) |
