= Chicon =

Chicon may refer to:

- Chicon (plant), another name for Belgian endive
- Chicon (Worldcon), a name given to World Science Fiction Conventions (Worldcons) that take place in Chicago, Illinois
- Chicón, a mountain in Peru
