= 48th World Science Fiction Convention =

48th Worldcon (1990)

ConFiction, the 48th World Science Fiction Convention
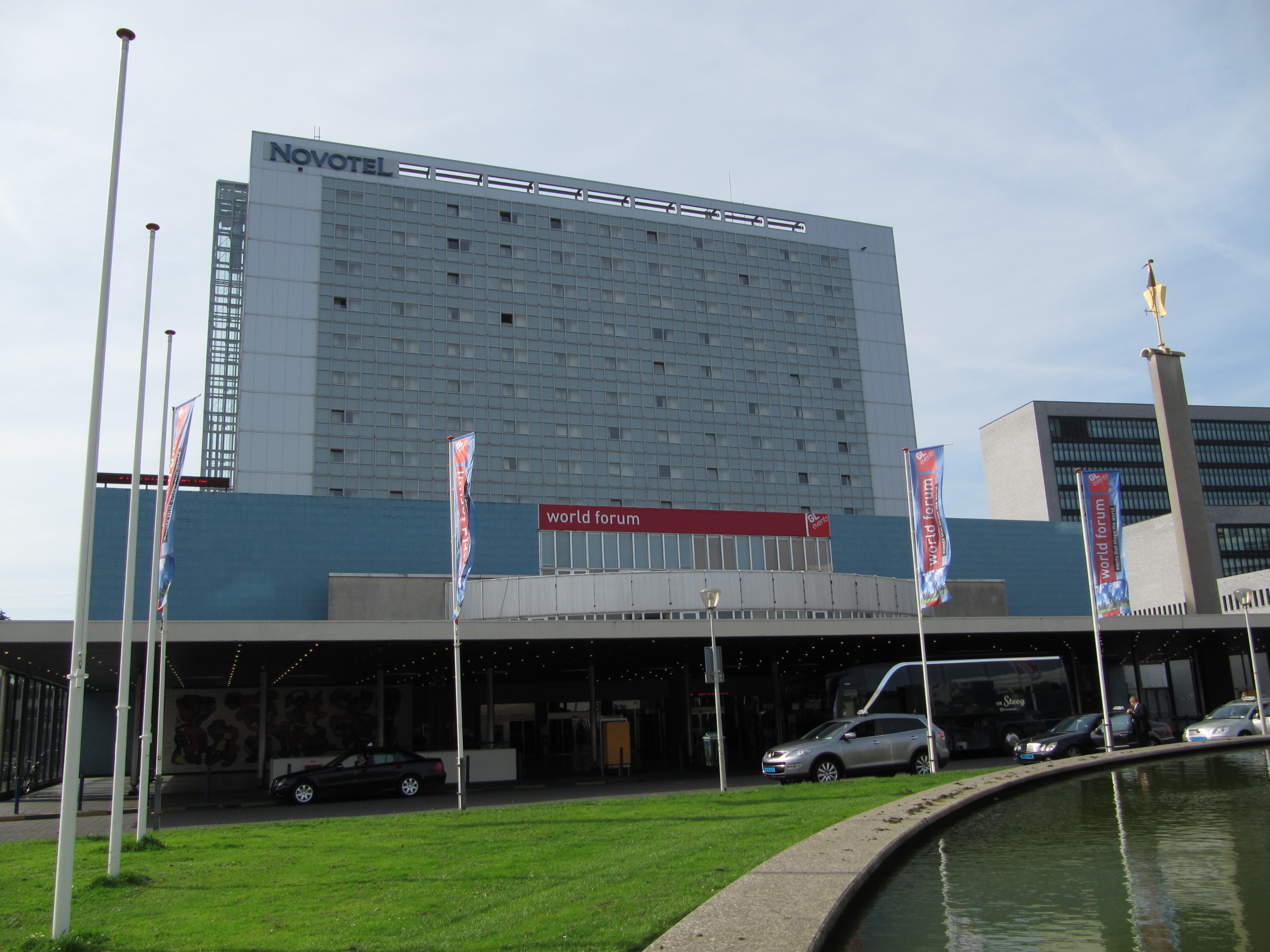
- Netherlands Congress Centre, now World Forum
- Genre: Science fiction
- Dates: 23–27 August 1990
- Venue: Netherlands Congress Centre
- Location: The Hague
- Country: Netherlands
- Attendance: 3,580

The 48th World Science Fiction Convention (Worldcon), also known as ConFiction, was held 23–27 August 1990 at the Netherlands Congress Centre in The Hague, Netherlands.

The organising committee was chaired by Kees van Toorn.

== Participants ==
Attendance was 3,580, despite the preparations for the Gulf War which deterred many Americans from traveling.

=== Guests of honor ===
- Joe Haldeman
- Wolfgang Jeschke
- Harry Harrison
- Andrew I. Porter (fan)
- Chelsea Quinn Yarbro (toastmaster)

== Awards ==
The World Science Fiction Society administers and presents the Hugo Awards, the oldest and most noteworthy award for science fiction. Selection of the recipients is by vote of the Worldcon members. Categories include novels and short fiction, artwork, dramatic presentations, and various professional and fandom activities.

Other awards may be presented at Worldcon at the discretion of the individual convention committee. This has often included the national SF awards of the host country, such as the Japanese Seiun Awards as part of Nippon 2007, and the Prix Aurora Awards as part of Anticipation in 2009. The Astounding Award for Best New Writer and the Sidewise Award, though not sponsored by the Worldcon, are usually presented, as well as the Chesley Awards, the Prometheus Award, and others. In 2021, the Nommo Awards began presenting at Worldcon.

=== 1990 Hugo Awards ===
- Best Novel: Hyperion by Dan Simmons
- Best Novella: "The Mountains of Mourning" by Lois McMaster Bujold
- Best Novelette: "Enter a Soldier. Later: Enter Another" by Robert Silverberg
- Best Short Story: "Boobs" by Suzy McKee Charnas
- Best Non-Fiction Book: The World Beyond the Hill by Alexei & Cory Panshin
- Best Dramatic Presentation: Indiana Jones and the Last Crusade
- Best Professional Editor: Gardner Dozois
- Best Professional Artist: Don Maitz
- Best Original Artwork: cover of Rimrunners by Don Maitz
- Best Semiprozine: Locus, edited by Charles N. Brown
- Best Fanzine: The Mad 3 Party, edited by Leslie Turek
- Best Fan Writer: Dave Langford
- Best Fan Artist: Stu Shiffman

=== Other awards ===
- John W. Campbell Award for Best New Writer: Kristine Kathryn Rusch

== Notes ==
The convention was opened by the then Minister of Cultural Affairs of the Netherlands, and the Hugos were presented by the U.S. Ambassador to the Netherlands.

This was the first Worldcon after the fall of the Berlin Wall, so was the first Worldcon which many fans, writers and editors from Eastern European countries were able to attend.

== See also ==
- Hugo Award
- Science fiction
- Speculative fiction
- World Science Fiction Society
- Worldcon

Preceded by 47th World Science Fiction Convention; Noreascon 3 in Boston, Massachusetts, United States (1989)	List of Worldcons; 48th World Science Fiction Convention; ConFiction in The Hague, Netherlands (1990)	Succeeded by 49th World Science Fiction Convention; Chicon V in Chicago, Illinois, United States (1991)
