= Discon =

Discon is the name given to the three Worldcons held in Washington, D.C.:

- Discon I, 1963
- Discon II, 1974
- DisCon III, 2021
