= 34th World Science Fiction Convention =

34th Worldcon (1976)

MidAmeriCon, the 34th World Science Fiction Convention
- Genre: Science fiction
- Dates: 2–6 September 1976
- Venue: Muehlebach Hotel and Phillips House
- Location: Kansas City, Missouri
- Country: United States
- Attendance: 3,014
- Organizer: Science Fiction Conventions of Kansas City, Inc.
- Filing status: 501(c)(3) non-profit

The 34th World Science Fiction Convention (Worldcon), also known as MidAmeriCon (abbreviated "MAC"), was held on 2–6 September 1976 at the Radisson Muehlebach Hotel and nearby Phillips House hotel in Kansas City, Missouri, United States.

The convention committee was chaired by Ken Keller, who had also chaired the "KC in '76" bid.

== Participants ==
Attendance was 3,014, out of 4,200 paid memberships.

=== Guests of honor ===
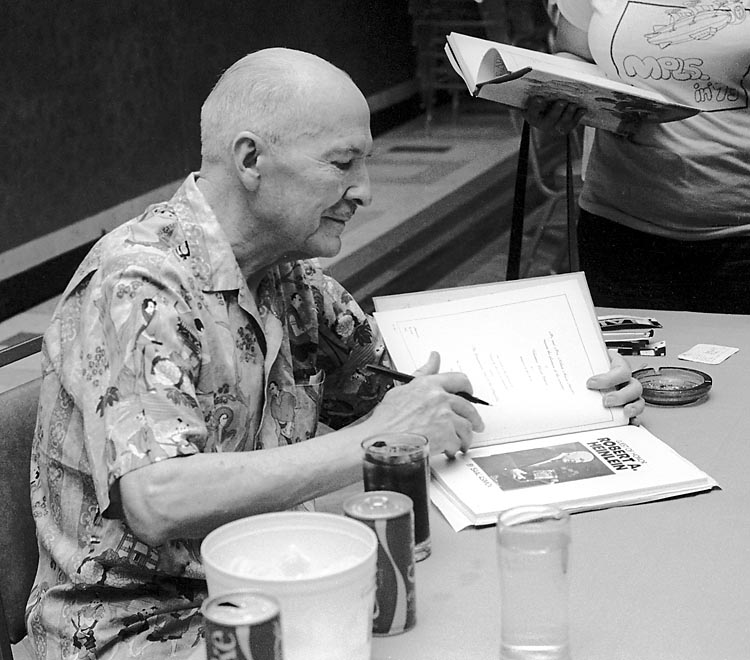
Heinlein at the blood donor's reception, Hotel Continental

The Professional Guest of Honor at the convention was former Kansas Citian Robert A. Heinlein. He did not prepare a formal guest of honor speech. Still, he gave a generally well-received one immediately following the convention's Hugo Awards ceremony at the nearby Art Deco-inspired Music Hall section of the Kansas City Municipal Auditorium. Heinlein came with an alarm clock, put it on his center stage podium, and spoke casually until his preset time period ended with the alarm going off. Heinlein was previously the Guest of Honor at the 3rd Worldcon (1941) and the 19th Worldcon (1961). He remains the only science fiction writer honored three times by the annual World Science Fiction Convention. Heinlein attended many MidAmeriCon events, including a blood donation drive and later donor reception at the nearby Hotel Continental, one of the Worldcon's overflow hotels. Being someone with a very rare blood type, Heinlein had organized the blood drive and reception to honor those anonymous donors who had donated blood, saving lives during surgeries, including his own earlier in the decade.

As part of Heinlein's speech at the Hugo awards ceremony, he cautioned the audience to be prepared for the next war, which he said was coming. He didn't specify an enemy, just promoting the idea of preparation for an inevitable event. Coming just a couple of years after the end of the war in Vietnam, this was an unwelcome message for many of the people in the audience, and he received some boos from people tired of war.

Longtime fan artist George Barr was the convention's Fan Guest of Honor. He created MidAmeriCon's official black-and-white logo artwork and painted the full-color, wrap-around dust jacket artwork used on the convention's 8.5″ × 11″ hardcover program book. Barr's hardcover art book, Upon the Winds of Yesterday from Donald F. Grant, Publisher, also made its debut at MidAmeriCon. It collects many examples of Barr's color and black-and-white fantasy and science fiction illustration.

Well-known long-time fan and fan writer and professional science fiction and mystery writer Wilson Tucker (aka Bob Tucker) served as the convention's Toastmaster.

== Programming and events ==
=== The Star Wars display ===
Listed in the MidAmeriCon pocket program was "The Star Wars Display" in Muehlebach Towers meeting room 364 (aka The Chapel). Charles Lippincott, Star Wars Corporation's vice-president of advertising, publicity, promotion, and merchandising, producer Gary Kurtz, and actor Mark Hamill were on hand promoting the upcoming George Lucas film, that would be released 9 months later in May 1977. At that point, the space fantasy was being called The Star Wars (Star Wars). Three of the film's costumes were displayed on mannequins: Darth Vader and the C-3PO and R2-D2 robots; also on display was Darth Vader's lightsaber (hanging from his belt) and a Storm Trooper helmet and blaster, behind-the-scenes production 8x10 stills, and a wall of framed conceptual artwork by Ralph McQuarrie. As a part of the studio's promotion of the film, an offset-printed, two-page yellow press release flyer was given away in the display room. It depicted an early graphic of the Luke Skywalker character drawn by McQuarrie. A dark blue, 2.25-inch wide promotional pin button, emblazoned with a white star field background and white type font that carried the motto "May the Force Be With You" was also given away. Finally, a largish, full-color film poster, illustrated by Howard Chaykin, was also available. The display proved so popular that all three promotional items were gone by the end of the second day of the display.

=== The Star Wars slide presentation ===
At 1:30 pm, on Saturday afternoon 4 September 1976, an hour-long presentation made up of 35mm slides of the film's production artwork and on-set production photos was hosted live in the Muehlebach's Imperial Ballroom, the hotel's largest, to a standing-room-only crowd. This was presented by The Star Wars Corporation's Charles Lippincott. During the course of his presentation, he outlined in great detail the full plot of the film from scene one through to the final scene before credits. A lengthy audience question-and-answer period followed with Lippincott, producer Gary Kurtz, and star Mark Hamill.

=== Forbidden Planet soundtrack and screening ===
The "electronic tonalities" soundtrack for the classic MGM science fiction film Forbidden Planet was first released in 1976 by Louis and Bebe Barron at MidAmeriCon. It was on a vinyl LP album, done for the film's 20th anniversary, on the Barron's own PLANET Records label (later changed to SMALL PLANET Records and distributed by GNP Crescendo Records). The LP was premiered at the convention by the Barrons as part of a 20th Anniversary celebration of the film being held at MidAmeriCon. They helped the convention's film programming staff arrange for the rental of fine grain film print from MGM's archival storage vaults. Three separate screenings of Forbidden Planet were held as part of the convention's all 35mm science fiction and fantasy film retrospective. The Barrons were on-hand to promote their signed soundtrack LP, and they introduced the first of the three screenings of the film.

=== First Hugo Losers party ===
For MidAmeriCon, science fiction and fantasy author George R. R. Martin, along with his good friend Gardner Dozois, organized the first-ever Hugo Losers Party, named a "dead dog" gathering. It was to be a gathering spot for all past Hugo Losers (as well as friends and family) and set to occur Monday evening after the "official" closing ceremonies for MidAmeriCon that afternoon. Martin and Dozois had planned to host the open party should Martin lose either Hugo for which he had been nominated. Martin became the party's undisputed host when he lost in both MidAmeriCon Hugo Awards categories: for the novelette "...and Seven Times Never Kill Man" and the novella The Storms of Windhaven, written with Lisa Tuttle.

Whenever a past or current Hugo loser entered, Martin, standing atop his three-drawer-high room dresser, would take a swig directly from a liquor bottle, and in a loud voice announce, "Looooose," as his other arm, held on high, made a wide, sweeping downward arc, all to the delight of the assembled party goers. A little later at the party, writer Larry Niven was presented with a replacement Hugo Award by convention chairman Ken Keller. As Niven entered, from atop his dresser, Martin announced in a well-lubricated voice, "There's another loser, he broke his new Hugo". Niven had dropped and broken the award in a backstage stairwell shortly after winning it while rushing back to his auditorium seat. Niven quickly departed after receiving a loud round of good-natured boos and catcalls in response to Keller's presentation. In the years and decades that followed, the Hugo Losers Party became an annual event and evolved into one of the largest social gatherings held annually at every Worldcon.

=== First hardcover program and souvenir book ===
The convention also produced another first: a highly collectible hardcover 172 page program and souvenir book, edited and designed by Tom Reamy. The book contained articles, essays, an artists' portfolio illustrating scenes from the novels of Guest of Honor Robert A. Heinlein, fiction by Harlan Ellison and Howard Waldrop, as well as convention-related items like guest biographies, detailed film program notes, a membership list, and paid advertising. Only two other hardcovers have subsequently been done, one by the 45th World Science Fiction Convention and one by the 63rd World Science Fiction Convention.

== Awards ==
The World Science Fiction Society administers and presents the Hugo Awards, the oldest and most noteworthy award for science fiction. Selection of the recipients is by vote of the Worldcon members. Categories include novels and short fiction, artwork, dramatic presentations, and various professional and fandom activities.

Other awards may be presented at Worldcon at the discretion of the individual convention committee. This has often included the national SF awards of the host country, such as the Japanese Seiun Awards as part of Nippon 2007, and the Prix Aurora Awards as part of Anticipation in 2009. The Astounding Award for Best New Writer and the Sidewise Award, though not sponsored by the Worldcon, are usually presented, as well as the Chesley Awards, the Prometheus Award, and others. In 2021, the Nommo Awards began presenting at Worldcon.

=== Change of ceremony and format ===
At MidAmeriCon, the 22nd Annual Science Fiction Achievement Awards, the Hugos, were held for the very first time as a stand-alone, separate event and not given out during a traditional combined guests of honor speeches and awards banquet in the Radisson Muehlebach Hotel. Instead, Sunday evening of the convention, they were presented in the nearby 2600-seat Music Hall of Kansas City's Art Deco Municipal Auditorium complex, in keeping with MidAmeriCon's theme, "Science Fiction and the Arts".

As convention members entered the Art Deco opulence of the Music Hall to take their seats, they were greeted by a variety of popular 1930's show tunes playing from the auditorium's speakers. The house lights slowly fading to black announced the start of the Hugo ceremony. Multiple super trooper spotlights began quickly panning the curtained stage area, just as Benny Goodman's original up-tempo show tune "Hoorah for Hollywood" began playing from the speakers. As the tune ended, the spotlights abruptly stopped, just as The Music Hall's house lights slowly began to come up. From the auditorium's speakers, Max Steiner's dramatic Overture from his score to the 1933 fantasy film King Kong began playing, just as the stage's seven sets of vertical and horizontal drapery were set in motion. The black grand drape opened slowly, revealing six colored vertical and horizontal drapes, opening one after the other, in sync to the movements of the one minute and 30 second Steiner composition. While the Overture was still playing, the stage became fully exposed and MidAmeriCon's George Barr illustrated logo was projected onto the large cyclorama backdrop: "MidAmeriCon Presents (slide dissolve) The 22nd Annual Science Fiction Achievement Awards (slide dissolve) The Hugos", the last slide appearing just as the rousing Steiner composition ended. From offstage, from the auditorium's speakers, a voice-over by Kansas City actor David Wilson, intoned King Kong dialog, "He was a King and a God in the world he knew (slight pause), but we've since tamed and brought him here for you tonight' (slight pause). Ladies and gentlemen, please welcome the 8th Wonder of the Science Fiction World, Mr. Bob Tucker". As Bob appeared from stage left, a brass-and-glass Art Deco podium slowly rose from a recess in the center front stage floor. When the applause died down, toastmaster Bob Tucker began his opening remarks, some of them humorous. He then introduced the members of MidAmeriCon's Hugo Awards Committee to more applause and thereafter made various announcements. The Hugo Awards were then presented, interspaced with five special awards which had their own presenters.

Bob Tucker was assisted on stage throughout the ceremony by MAC committee member Pat Cadigan and Hugo Awards committee member India Boone. Cadigan brought each nominee envelope onstage to Tucker and Boone brought out each Hugo Award after he read each category's nominees and announced a recipient. Each came up on stage from a special reserved nominee's seating area at the center front of the Music Hall.

Following a brief intermission after the Hugo Awards presentation, Guest of Honor Robert A. Heinlein was given a lengthy introduction by Tucker. After coming onstage to a huge round of applause, he gave his guest of honor address to the assembled audience. This was followed by Tucker's concluding remarks and the close of the ceremony.

=== 1976 Hugo Awards ===
- Best Novel: The Forever War by Joe Haldeman
- Best Novella: "Home Is the Hangman" by Roger Zelazny
- Best Novelette: "The Borderland of Sol" by Larry Niven
- Best Short Story: "Catch That Zeppelin!" by Fritz Leiber
- Best Dramatic Presentation: A Boy and His Dog
- Best Professional Editor: Ben Bova
- Best Professional Artist: Frank Kelly Freas
- Best Fanzine: Locus, edited by Charles N. Brown and Dena Brown
- Best Fan Writer: Richard E. Geis
- Best Fan Artist: Tim Kirk

==== First "themed" Hugo base ====
MidAmeriCon also presented another Worldcon first, a "themed" base used for the Hugo Award: "The Dragon and the Rocket". Instead of being made out of finished wood in square or angled stacked shapes, as in the past, all bases were cast from flexible molds using a marbled effect achieved by combining contrasting tinted porcelain powder layers with resin and a hardener. When cured, a low-luster clear outer finish was then applied. Each example featured a sculpted, just-hatched dragon (representing the fantasy genre) wrapped half-way around each round 4.5" tall base. The traditional 13" tall, four-finned Hugo rocket (representing science fiction) was John Millard's newer 1973 design; a dozen examples had been machined from billet aluminum stock and then finished with an overall semi-gloss clear outer coat. The flat top of each base had a 4-inch diameter, quarter-inch thick, sand-blasted aluminum "transition" disk that each rocket sat upon. The rocket and disc where then friction tightened to the base through its center using a long threaded bolt and nut; each base's round, flat bottom was then covered with adhesive-backed dark brown felt to hide the recessed attachment point. A curved black-and-silver engraved Hugo information plate was affixed by two screws to the front of each base (opposite the wrapped dragon). The overall base design concept was by convention chairman Ken Keller, with the final finished design and casting master sculpted by three-time Hugo Award-winning fan artist Tim Kirk (who went on to win his fourth Hugo in the same category that year).

=== Other awards ===
- Worldcon Special Achievement Award: James E. Gunn for Alternate Worlds, The Illustrated History of Science Fiction
- John W. Campbell Award for Best New Writer: Tom Reamy
- Gandalf Grand Master Award: L. Sprague de Camp
- The E. Everett Evans Memorial "Big Heart" Award: Ronald E. Graham
- First Fandom Hall of Fame Award: Harry Bates

== See also ==
- Hugo Award
- Science fiction
- Speculative fiction
- World Science Fiction Society
- Worldcon

Preceded by 33rd World Science Fiction Convention; Aussiecon One in Melbourne, Australia (1975)	List of Worldcons; 34th World Science Fiction Convention; MidAmeriCon in Kansas City, Missouri, United States (1976)	Succeeded by 35th World Science Fiction Convention; SunCon I in Miami Beach, Florida, United States (1977)
