= 26th World Science Fiction Convention =

26th Worldcon (1968)

Baycon, the 26th World Science Fiction Convention
- Genre: Science fiction
- Dates: 29 August–2 September 1968
- Venue: Claremont Hotel
- Location: Berkeley, California
- Country: United States
- Attendance: ~1,430
- Organizer: World Science Fiction Society
- Filing status: non-profit

The 26th World Science Fiction Convention (Worldcon), also known as Baycon, was held on 29 August–2 September 1968 at the Claremont Hotel in Berkeley, California, United States.

In 1968, Worldcon, annual World Science Fiction Convention, was combined with Westercon, the annual West Coast Science Fantasy Conference, sharing guests of honor and chairmen. The chairmen were Bill Donaho, Alva Rogers, and J. Ben Stark.

== Participants ==
Attendance was approximately 1,430.

=== Guests of honor ===
- Philip José Farmer (pro)
- Walter J. Daugherty (fan)
- Robert Silverberg (toastmaster)

== Awards ==
The World Science Fiction Society administers and presents the Hugo Awards, the oldest and most noteworthy award for science fiction. Selection of the recipients is by vote of the Worldcon members. Categories include novels and short fiction, artwork, dramatic presentations, and various professional and fandom activities.

Other awards may be presented at Worldcon at the discretion of the individual convention committee. This has often included the national SF awards of the host country, such as the Japanese Seiun Awards as part of Nippon 2007, and the Prix Aurora Awards as part of Anticipation in 2009. The Astounding Award for Best New Writer and the Sidewise Award, though not sponsored by the Worldcon, are usually presented, as well as the Chesley Awards, the Prometheus Award, and others. In 2021, the Nommo Awards began presenting at Worldcon.

=== 1968 Hugo Awards ===
- Best Novel: Lord of Light by Roger Zelazny
- Best Novella:
  - "Weyr Search" by Anne McCaffrey and
  - "Riders of the Purple Wage" by Philip José Farmer (tie)
- Best Novelette: "Gonna Roll Them Bones" by Fritz Leiber
- Best Short Story: "I Have No Mouth, and I Must Scream" by Harlan Ellison
- Best Dramatic Presentation: "The City on the Edge of Forever" (Star Trek episode, original script by Harlan Ellison)
- Best Professional Artist: Jack Gaughan
- Best Professional Magazine: if
- Best Fanzine: Amra, edited by George Scithers
- Best Fan Artist: George Barr
- Best Fan Writer: Ted White

=== Other awards ===
- Special Award: Harlan Ellison for Dangerous Visions
- Special Award: Gene Roddenberry for Star Trek

== Notes ==
This Worldcon was the first one that was attended by large numbers of people in the hippie subculture. A psychedelic light show was presented in the main ballroom of the hotel. Robert Silverberg gave a speech about using LSD to attain a mystical experience. Harlan Ellison read a story he had written about a hippie commune.

Poul Anderson emceed a presentation by the Society for Creative Anachronism.

Long-time president of DAW Books, Betsy Wollheim (whose father, author and publisher Donald A. Wollheim, was a leader in the development of science fiction as a popular genre) remembers:

The high point of my childhood experience at conventions was Baycon 1968 in Oakland. I remember the excitement of it all—sliding down the fire slides, the big eucalyptus forest behind the Claremont Hotel...the tournaments on the lawn.... And I remember at the age of 16 thinking, "No convention can ever be this wonderful again, so I should never go to another." Famous last words!

== See also ==
- Hugo Award
- Science fiction
- Speculative fiction
- World Science Fiction Society
- Worldcon

Preceded by 25th World Science Fiction Convention; NyCon 3 in New York City, USA (1967)	List of Worldcons; 26th World Science Fiction Convention; Baycon in Berkeley, California, USA (1968)	Succeeded by 27th World Science Fiction Convention; St. Louiscon in St. Louis, Missouri, USA (1969)
