= 42nd World Science Fiction Convention =

42nd Worldcon (1984)

L.A.con II, the 42nd World Science Fiction Convention
- Genre: Science fiction
- Dates: 30 August–3 September 1984
- Venue: Anaheim Hilton and the Anaheim Convention Center
- Location: Anaheim, California
- Country: United States
- Attendance: 8,365
- Filing status: non-profit

The 42nd World Science Fiction Convention (Worldcon), also known as L.A.con II, was held on 30 August–3 September 1984 at the Anaheim Hilton and the Anaheim Convention Center in Anaheim, California, United States.

The chairmen were Craig Miller and Milt Stevens.

== Participants ==
Attendance was 8,365, the record As of 2021.

=== Guests of honor ===
- Gordon R. Dickson (pro)
- Dick Eney (fan)
- Robert Bloch (toastmaster for the Hugo ceremony)
- Jerry Pournelle (Master of Ceremonies for the Other Awards ceremony)

=== Other notable participants ===
A.E. Van Vogt attended the convention.

Robert Heinlein appeared, continuing his campaign to encourage science fiction fans to make blood donations.

== Awards ==
The World Science Fiction Society administers and presents the Hugo Awards, the oldest and most noteworthy award for science fiction. Selection of the recipients is by vote of the Worldcon members. Categories include novels and short fiction, artwork, dramatic presentations, and various professional and fandom activities.

Other awards may be presented at Worldcon at the discretion of the individual convention committee. This has often included the national SF awards of the host country, such as the Japanese Seiun Awards as part of Nippon 2007, and the Prix Aurora Awards as part of Anticipation in 2009. The Astounding Award for Best New Writer and the Sidewise Award, though not sponsored by the Worldcon, are usually presented, as well as the Chesley Awards, the Prometheus Award, and others. In 2021, the Nommo Awards began presenting at Worldcon.

=== 1984 Hugo Awards ===
- Best Novel: Startide Rising by David Brin
- Best Novella: "Cascade Point" by Timothy Zahn
- Best Novelette: "Blood Music" by Greg Bear
- Best Short Story: "Speech Sounds" by Octavia Butler
- Best Non-Fiction Book: Encyclopedia of Science Fiction and Fantasy, vol. III, by Donald Tuck
- Best Dramatic Presentation: Return of the Jedi
- Best Professional Editor: Shawna McCarthy
- Best Professional Artist: Michael Whelan
- Best Semiprozine: Locus, by Charles N. Brown
- Best Fanzine: File 770, edited by Mike Glyer
- Best Fan Writer: Mike Glyer
- Best Fan Artist: Alexis Gilliland

=== Other awards ===
- John W. Campbell Award for Best New Writer: R. A. MacAvoy
- Special Award:
  - Larry T. Shaw for lifetime achievement as a science fiction editor
  - Robert Bloch for fifty years as a science fiction professional

== See also ==
- Hugo Award
- Science fiction
- Speculative fiction
- World Science Fiction Society
- Worldcon

Preceded by 41st World Science Fiction Convention; ConStellation in Baltimore, Maryland, United States (1983)	List of Worldcons; 42nd World Science Fiction Convention; L.A.con II in Anaheim, California, United States (1984)	Succeeded by 43rd World Science Fiction Convention; Aussiecon Two in Melbourne, Australia (1985)
