= 17th World Science Fiction Convention =

17th Worldcon (1959)

Detention, the 17th World Science Fiction Convention
- Genre: Science fiction
- Dates: 4–7 September 1959
- Venue: Pick Fort Shelby Hotel
- Location: Detroit, Michigan
- Country: United States
- Attendance: 371

The 17th World Science Fiction Convention (Worldcon), also known as Detention, was held on 4–7 September 1959 at the Pick Fort Shelby Hotel in Detroit, Michigan, United States.

The chairmen were Roger Sims and Fred Prophet.

== Participants ==
Attendance was 371.

=== Guests of honor ===
- Poul Anderson (pro)
- John Berry (fan)
- Isaac Asimov (toastmaster, "...with the assistance of Robert Bloch")

== Awards ==
The World Science Fiction Society administers and presents the Hugo Awards, the oldest and most noteworthy award for science fiction. Selection of the recipients is by vote of the Worldcon members. Categories include novels and short fiction, artwork, dramatic presentations, and various professional and fandom activities.

Other awards may be presented at Worldcon at the discretion of the individual convention committee. This has often included the national SF awards of the host country, such as the Japanese Seiun Awards as part of Nippon 2007, and the Prix Aurora Awards as part of Anticipation in 2009. The Astounding Award for Best New Writer and the Sidewise Award, though not sponsored by the Worldcon, are usually presented, as well as the Chesley Awards, the Prometheus Award, and others. In 2021, the Nommo Awards began presenting at Worldcon.

=== 1959 Hugo Awards ===
The winners were:

- Best Novel: A Case of Conscience, by James Blish
- Best Novelette: "The Big Front Yard", by Clifford D. Simak
- Best Short Story: "That Hell-Bound Train", by Robert Bloch
- Best SF or Fantasy Movie: no winner chosen
- Best Professional Magazine: The Magazine of Fantasy & Science Fiction, edited by Anthony Boucher and Robert P. Mills
- Best Professional Artist: Frank Kelly Freas
- Best Fanzine: Fanac, edited by Terry Carr and Ron Ellik
- Best New Author of 1958: no winner chosen

== See also ==
- Hugo Award
- Science fiction
- Speculative fiction
- World Science Fiction Society
- Worldcon

Preceded by 16th World Science Fiction Convention; Solacon in Los Angeles, California, United States (1958)	List of Worldcons; 17th World Science Fiction Convention; Detention in Detroit, Michigan, United States (1959)	Succeeded by 18th World Science Fiction Convention; Pittcon in Pittsburgh, Pennsylvania, United States (1960)
