= 35th World Science Fiction Convention =

35th Worldcon (1977)

SunCon, the 35th World Science Fiction Convention
- Genre: Science fiction
- Dates: 2–5 September 1977
- Venue: Fontainebleau Hotel
- Location: Miami Beach, Florida
- Country: United States
- Attendance: ~3,240

The 35th World Science Fiction Convention (Worldcon), also known as SunCon, was held on 2–5 September 1977 at the Fontainebleau Hotel in Miami Beach, Florida, United States.

The chairman was Don Lundry.

== Participants ==
Attendance was approximately 3,240.

=== Guests of honor ===
- Jack Williamson (pro)
- Robert A. Madle (fan)
- Robert Silverberg (toastmaster)

== Awards ==
The World Science Fiction Society administers and presents the Hugo Awards, the oldest and most noteworthy award for science fiction. Selection of the recipients is by vote of the Worldcon members. Categories include novels and short fiction, artwork, dramatic presentations, and various professional and fandom activities.

Other awards may be presented at Worldcon at the discretion of the individual convention committee. This has often included the national SF awards of the host country, such as the Japanese Seiun Awards as part of Nippon 2007, and the Prix Aurora Awards as part of Anticipation in 2009. The Astounding Award for Best New Writer and the Sidewise Award, though not sponsored by the Worldcon, are usually presented, as well as the Chesley Awards, the Prometheus Award, and others. In 2021, the Nommo Awards began presenting at Worldcon.

=== 1977 Hugo Awards ===
- Best Novel: Where Late the Sweet Birds Sang by Kate Wilhelm
- Best Novella:
  - "By Any Other Name" by Spider Robinson and
  - "Houston, Houston, Do You Read?" by James Tiptree, Jr. (tie)
- Best Novelette: "The Bicentennial Man" by Isaac Asimov
- Best Short Story: "Tricentennial" by Joe Haldeman
- Best Professional Editor: Ben Bova
- Best Professional Artist: Rick Sternbach
- Best Amateur Magazine: Science Fiction Review, edited by Richard E. Geis
- Best Fan Writer:
  - Susan Wood and
  - Richard E. Geis (tie)
- Best Fan Artist: Phil Foglio

=== Other awards ===
- Special Award: George Lucas for Star Wars
- John W. Campbell Award for Best New Writer: C. J. Cherryh
- Gandalf Grand Master Award: Andre Norton

== See also ==
- Hugo Award
- Science fiction
- Speculative fiction
- World Science Fiction Society
- Worldcon

Preceded by 34th World Science Fiction Convention; MidAmeriCon in Kansas City, Missouri, United States (1976)	List of Worldcons; 35th World Science Fiction Convention; SunCon in Miami Beach, Florida, United States (1977)	Succeeded by 36th World Science Fiction Convention; IguanaCon II in Phoenix, Arizona, United States (1978)
