= 22nd World Science Fiction Convention =

22nd Worldcon (1964)

Pacificon II, the 22nd World Science Fiction Convention
- Genre: Science fiction
- Dates: 4–7 September 1964
- Venue: Hotel Leamington
- Location: Oakland, California
- Country: United States
- Attendance: ~523
- Filing status: Non-profit

The 22nd World Science Fiction Convention (Worldcon), also known as Pacificon II, was held on 4–7 September 1964 at the Hotel Leamington in Oakland, California, United States.

Pacificon was combined with Westercon, the annual West Coast Science Fantasy Conference, sharing guests of honor and chairmen. The chairmen were J. Ben Stark and Al haLevy.

== Participants ==
Approximately 523 people attended.

=== Guests of honor ===
- Leigh Brackett (pro)
- Edmond Hamilton (pro)
- Forrest J Ackerman (fan)
- Anthony Boucher (toastmaster)

== Awards ==
The World Science Fiction Society administers and presents the Hugo Awards, the oldest and most noteworthy award for science fiction. Selection of the recipients is by vote of the Worldcon members. Categories include novels and short fiction, artwork, dramatic presentations, and various professional and fandom activities.

Other awards may be presented at Worldcon at the discretion of the individual convention committee. This has often included the national SF awards of the host country, such as the Japanese Seiun Awards as part of Nippon 2007, and the Prix Aurora Awards as part of Anticipation in 2009. The Astounding Award for Best New Writer and the Sidewise Award, though not sponsored by the Worldcon, are usually presented, as well as the Chesley Awards, the Prometheus Award, and others. In 2021, the Nommo Awards began presenting at Worldcon.

=== 1964 Hugo Awards ===
- Best Novel: Way Station by Clifford D. Simak
- Best Short Fiction: "No Truce with Kings" by Poul Anderson
- Best Professional Artist: Ed Emshwiller
- Best Professional Magazine: Analog
- Best Amateur Magazine: Amra, edited by George Scithers
- Best SF Book Publisher: Ace Books

== See also ==
- Hugo Award
- Science fiction
- Speculative fiction
- World Science Fiction Society
- Worldcon

Preceded by 21st World Science Fiction Convention; Discon I in Washington, D.C., United States (1963)	List of Worldcons; 22nd World Science Fiction Convention; Pacificon II in Oakland, California, United States (1964)	Succeeded by 23rd World Science Fiction Convention; Loncon II in London, UK (1965)
