= 16th World Science Fiction Convention =

16th Worldcon (1958)

Solacon, the 16th World Science Fiction Convention
- Genre: Science fiction
- Dates: 29 August–1 September 1958
- Venue: Alexandria Hotel
- Location: Los Angeles, California
- Country: United States
- Attendance: 322

The 16th World Science Fiction Convention (Worldcon), also known as Solacon, was held on 29 August–1 September 1958 at the Alexandria Hotel in Los Angeles, California, United States.

Solacon's chair was Anne S. Moffatt.

== Participants ==
Attendance was 322.

=== Guests of honor ===
- Richard Matheson
- Anthony Boucher (toastmaster)

== Awards ==
The World Science Fiction Society administers and presents the Hugo Awards, the oldest and most noteworthy award for science fiction. Selection of the recipients is by vote of the Worldcon members. Categories include novels and short fiction, artwork, dramatic presentations, and various professional and fandom activities.

Other awards may be presented at Worldcon at the discretion of the individual convention committee. This has often included the national SF awards of the host country, such as the Japanese Seiun Awards as part of Nippon 2007, and the Prix Aurora Awards as part of Anticipation in 2009. The Astounding Award for Best New Writer and the Sidewise Award, though not sponsored by the Worldcon, are usually presented, as well as the Chesley Awards, the Prometheus Award, and others. In 2021, the Nommo Awards began presenting at Worldcon.

=== 1958 Hugo Awards ===
For the 1958 Hugos, Solacon presented engraved Hugo Award plaques instead of the nickel-plated Hugo rockets mounted on wooden bases, like those presented at the previous Worldcons in 1953, 1955, 1956, and 1957 (no awards were given in 1954).

The winners were:

- Best Novel/Novelette: The Big Time, by Fritz Leiber
- Best Short Story: "Or All the Seas with Oysters", by Avram Davidson
- Best Professional Magazine: The Magazine of Fantasy & Science Fiction, edited by Anthony Boucher and Robert P. Mills
- Outstanding Movie: The Incredible Shrinking Man, directed by Jack Arnold; screenplay by Richard Matheson
- Outstanding Artist: Frank Kelly Freas
- Outstanding Actifan: Walt Willis

== Notes ==
Solacon was physically in Los Angeles, but (by mayoral proclamation) technically in South Gate, California, to fulfill their longtime bid slogan (since 1948) of "South Gate in '58."

Superfan Rick Sneary had a cardboard sign at this convention that read "We'll do it again in 2010" that he carried to numerous future Worldcons. His death in 1990 laid that dream to rest and the 2010 Worldcon took place in Melbourne, Australia.

== See also ==
- Hugo Award
- Science fiction
- Speculative fiction
- World Science Fiction Society
- Worldcon

Preceded by 15th World Science Fiction Convention; Loncon I in London, UK (1957)	List of Worldcons; 16th World Science Fiction Convention; Solacon in Los Angeles, California, United States (1958)	Succeeded by 17th World Science Fiction Convention; Detention in Detroit, Michigan, United States (1959)
