= 41st World Science Fiction Convention =

41st Worldcon (1983)

ConStellation, the 41st World Science Fiction Convention
- Genre: Science fiction
- Dates: 1–5 September 1983
- Venue: Baltimore Convention Center
- Location: Baltimore, Maryland
- Country: United States
- Attendance: ~7,000
- Filing status: non-profit

The 41st World Science Fiction Convention (Worldcon), also known as ConStellation, was held on 1–5 September 1983 at the Baltimore Convention Center in Baltimore, Maryland, United States.

The chairman was Michael J. Walsh.

== Participants ==
Attendance was approximately 7,000.

=== Guests of honor ===
- John Brunner (pro)
- David A. Kyle (fan)
- Jack L. Chalker (toastmaster)

=== Other notable participants ===
As part of the promotion for the film The Right Stuff, test pilot Chuck Yeager, astronaut Gordon Cooper, plus actors Veronica Cartwright, Scott Glenn, and Dennis Quaid appeared at the convention.

== Awards ==
The World Science Fiction Society administers and presents the Hugo Awards, the oldest and most noteworthy award for science fiction. Selection of the recipients is by vote of the Worldcon members. Categories include novels and short fiction, artwork, dramatic presentations, and various professional and fandom activities.

Other awards may be presented at Worldcon at the discretion of the individual convention committee. This has often included the national SF awards of the host country, such as the Japanese Seiun Awards as part of Nippon 2007, and the Prix Aurora Awards as part of Anticipation in 2009. The Astounding Award for Best New Writer and the Sidewise Award, though not sponsored by the Worldcon, are usually presented, as well as the Chesley Awards, the Prometheus Award, and others. In 2021, the Nommo Awards began presenting at Worldcon.

=== 1983 Hugo Awards ===
- Best Novel: Foundation's Edge by Isaac Asimov
- Best Novella: "Souls" by Joanna Russ
- Best Novelette: "Fire Watch" by Connie Willis
- Best Short Story: "Melancholy Elephants" by Spider Robinson
- Best Non-Fiction Book: Isaac Asimov: The Foundations of Science Fiction by James E. Gunn
- Best Dramatic Presentation: Blade Runner
- Best Professional Editor: Edward L. Ferman
- Best Professional Artist: Michael Whelan
- Best Fanzine: Locus, edited by Charles N. Brown
- Best Fan Writer: Richard E. Geis
- Best Fan Artist: Alexis Gilliland

=== Other awards ===
- John W. Campbell Award for Best New Writer: Paul O. Williams

== See also ==
- Hugo Award
- Science fiction
- Speculative fiction
- World Science Fiction Society
- Worldcon

Preceded by 40th World Science Fiction Convention; Chicon IV in Chicago, Illinois, United States (1982)	List of Worldcons; 41st World Science Fiction Convention; ConStellation in Baltimore, Maryland, United States (1983)	Succeeded by 42nd World Science Fiction Convention; L.A.con II in Anaheim, California, United States (1984)
