= 47th World Science Fiction Convention =

47th Worldcon (1989)

Noreascon 3, the 47th World Science Fiction Convention
- Genre: Science fiction
- Dates: 31 August–4 September 1989
- Venue: Sheraton-Boston Hotel, Hilton Hotel, Boston Park Plaza, and the Hynes Convention Center
- Location: Boston, Massachusetts
- Country: United States
- Attendance: 6,837
- Filing status: non-profit

The 47th World Science Fiction Convention (Worldcon), also known as Noreascon 3 (or "...Three", or "...III"), was held on 31 August–4 September 1989 at the Sheraton-Boston Hotel, Hilton Hotel, Boston Park Plaza, and the Hynes Convention Center in Boston, Massachusetts, United States.

The chairman was Mark L. Olson.

== Participants ==
Attendance was 6,837, out of 7,795 paid memberships.

=== Guests of honor ===
- Andre Norton (pro)
- Ian & Betty Ballantine (pro)
- The Stranger Club (fan)

The Stranger Club is the first known science fiction club in the Boston area, and the organizers of Boskone I, New England's first science fiction convention, in 1941. Seven surviving members of the latter group attended, including Harry Stubbs (Hal Clement) and Chandler Davis.

== Awards ==
The World Science Fiction Society administers and presents the Hugo Awards, the oldest and most noteworthy award for science fiction. Selection of the recipients is by vote of the Worldcon members. Categories include novels and short fiction, artwork, dramatic presentations, and various professional and fandom activities.

Other awards may be presented at Worldcon at the discretion of the individual convention committee. This has often included the national SF awards of the host country, such as the Japanese Seiun Awards as part of Nippon 2007, and the Prix Aurora Awards as part of Anticipation in 2009. The Astounding Award for Best New Writer and the Sidewise Award, though not sponsored by the Worldcon, are usually presented, as well as the Chesley Awards, the Prometheus Award, and others. In 2021, the Nommo Awards began presenting at Worldcon.

=== 1989 Hugo Awards ===
The 1989 Hugo Award base honored the 50th anniversary of both the 1939 New York World's Fair and the first Worldcon. The Fair's iconic Trylon and Perisphere were represented with the Hugo Award rocket taking the place of the 610 feet (190 m) tall Trylon spire.

- Best Novel: Cyteen by C. J. Cherryh
- Best Novella: "The Last of the Winnebagos" by Connie Willis
- Best Novelette: "Schrödinger's Kitten" by George Alec Effinger
- Best Short Story: "Kirinyaga" by Mike Resnick
- Best Non-Fiction Book: The Motion of Light in Water by Samuel R. Delany
- Best Dramatic Presentation: Who Framed Roger Rabbit
- Best Professional Editor: Gardner Dozois
- Best Professional Artist: Michael Whelan
- Best Semiprozine: Locus, edited by Charles N. Brown
- Best Fanzine: File 770, edited by Mike Glyer
- Best Fan Writer: Dave Langford
- Best Fan Artist:
  - Brad Foster and
  - Diana Gallagher Wu (tie)

=== Other awards ===
- Special Award: SF-Lovers Digest for pioneering the use of computer bulletin boards in fandom
- Special Award: Alex Schomburg for lifetime achievement in science fiction art
- John W. Campbell Award for Best New Writer: Michaela Roessner

== See also ==
- Hugo Award
- Science fiction
- Speculative fiction
- World Science Fiction Society
- Worldcon

Preceded by 46th World Science Fiction Convention; Nolacon II in New Orleans, Louisiana, United States (1988)	List of Worldcons; 47th World Science Fiction Convention; Noreascon 3 in Boston, Massachusetts, United States (1989)	Succeeded by 48th World Science Fiction Convention; ConFiction in The Hague, Netherlands (1990)
