= 37th World Science Fiction Convention =

37th Worldcon (1979)

Seacon '79, the 37th World Science Fiction Convention
- Genre: Science fiction
- Dates: 23–26 August 1979
- Venue: Metropole Hotel
- Location: Brighton
- Country: United Kingdom
- Attendance: 3,114

The 37th World Science Fiction Convention (Worldcon), also known as Seacon '79, was held on 23–26 August 1979 at the Metropole Hotel in Brighton, United Kingdom.

The convention committee was chaired by Peter Weston.

== Participants ==
Attendance was 3,114.

=== Guests of Honour ===
- Brian Aldiss (UK)
- Fritz Leiber (US)
- Harry Bell (fan)
- Bob Shaw (toastmaster)

== Awards ==
The World Science Fiction Society administers and presents the Hugo Awards, the oldest and most noteworthy award for science fiction. Selection of the recipients is by vote of the Worldcon members. Categories include novels and short fiction, artwork, dramatic presentations, and various professional and fandom activities.

Other awards may be presented at Worldcon at the discretion of the individual convention committee. This has often included the national SF awards of the host country, such as the Japanese Seiun Awards as part of Nippon 2007, and the Prix Aurora Awards as part of Anticipation in 2009. The Astounding Award for Best New Writer and the Sidewise Award, though not sponsored by the Worldcon, are usually presented, as well as the Chesley Awards, the Prometheus Award, and others. In 2021, the Nommo Awards began presenting at Worldcon.

=== 1979 Hugo Awards ===
- Best Novel: Dreamsnake by Vonda McIntyre
- Best Novella: "The Persistence of Vision" by John Varley
- Best Novelette: "Hunter's Moon" by Poul Anderson
- Best Short Story: "Cassandra" by C. J. Cherryh
- Best Dramatic Presentation: Superman
- Best Professional Editor: Ben Bova
- Best Professional Artist: Vincent DiFate
- Best Fanzine: Science Fiction Review, edited by Richard E. Geis
- Best Fan Writer: Bob Shaw
- Best Fan Artist: Bill Rotsler

=== Other awards ===
- John W. Campbell Award for Best New Writer: Stephen R. Donaldson
- Gandalf Awards:
  - Gandalf Grand Master Award: Ursula K. Le Guin
  - Gandalf Award for Book-Length Fantasy: The White Dragon by Anne McCaffrey

== See also ==
- Hugo Award
- Science fiction
- Speculative fiction
- World Science Fiction Society
- Worldcon

Preceded by 36th World Science Fiction Convention; IguanaCon II in Phoenix, Arizona, United States (1978)	List of Worldcons; 37th World Science Fiction Convention; Seacon '79 in Brighton, UK (1979)	Succeeded by 38th World Science Fiction Convention; Noreascon Two in Boston, Massachusetts, United States (1980)
