= 20th World Science Fiction Convention =

20th Worldcon (1962)

Chicon III, the 20th World Science Fiction Convention
- Genre: Science fiction
- Dates: 31 August–3 September 1962
- Venue: Pick-Congress Hotel
- Location: Chicago, Illinois
- Country: United States
- Attendance: ~730
- Filing status: Non-profit
- Website: chicon.org

The 20th World Science Fiction Convention (Worldcon), also known unofficially as Chicon III (less frequently, Chicon II), was held on 31 August–3 September 1962 at the Pick-Congress Hotel in Chicago, Illinois, United States.

Because the second Worldcon held in Chicago was officially called, in its publications, the 10th Annual World Science Fiction Convention (and once as the "10th Annual Science Fiction Convention") and not Chicon, the next Chicago Worldcon held in 1962 was occasionally referred to as Chicon II, though Chicon III is the generally accepted and preferred nomenclature.

The chairman was Earl Kemp.

== Participants ==
Attendance was approximately 730.

=== Guests of honor ===
- Theodore Sturgeon
- Wilson Tucker (toastmaster)

== Programming and events ==
Following the convention, Advent:Publishers published The Proceedings: Chicon III, edited by Earl Kemp. The book includes transcripts of lectures and panels given during the course of the convention and includes numerous photographs as well. Events at the convention included an address by Willy Ley.

== Awards ==
The World Science Fiction Society administers and presents the Hugo Awards, the oldest and most noteworthy award for science fiction. Selection of the recipients is by vote of the Worldcon members. Categories include novels and short fiction, artwork, dramatic presentations, and various professional and fandom activities.

Other awards may be presented at Worldcon at the discretion of the individual convention committee. This has often included the national SF awards of the host country, such as the Japanese Seiun Awards as part of Nippon 2007, and the Prix Aurora Awards as part of Anticipation in 2009. The Astounding Award for Best New Writer and the Sidewise Award, though not sponsored by the Worldcon, are usually presented, as well as the Chesley Awards, the Prometheus Award, and others. In 2021, the Nommo Awards began presenting at Worldcon.

=== 1962 Hugo Awards ===
- Best Novel: Stranger in a Strange Land by Robert A. Heinlein
- Best Short Fiction: the "Hothouse" series (collected as: The Long Afternoon of Earth) by Brian W. Aldiss
- Best Dramatic Presentation: The Twilight Zone
- Best Professional Artist: Ed Emshwiller
- Best Professional Magazine: Analog
- Best Fanzine: Warhoon, edited by Richard Bergeron

=== Other awards ===
- Special Award: Cele Goldsmith for editing Amazing Stories and Fantastic magazines
- Special Award: Donald H. Tuck for The Handbook of Science Fiction and Fantasy
- Special Award: Fritz Leiber and the Hoffman Electric Corporation for the use of science fiction in advertisements

== In fiction ==
S. M. Stirling's 2008 alternate history novel In the Courts of the Crimson Kings begins with a prologue set at this convention, in which a group of the science fiction authors in attendance watch a television broadcast of an American space probe as it lands on an inhabited Mars. Those present include Frederik and Carol Pohl, Poul Anderson, H. Beam Piper, Guest of Honor Theodore Sturgeon, Jack Williamson, Robert and Virginia Heinlein, Arthur C. Clarke, Larry Niven, Isaac Asimov, L. Sprague and Catherine Crook de Camp, John W. Campbell, Frank Herbert, and Leigh Brackett. Heinlein mentions an idea for a novel about Mars he had had but set aside when "the preliminary orbital telescope reports" had come in. (In actual history the completed book, Stranger in a Strange Land, won the Hugo Award for Best Novel at the convention.) The authors comment as the broadcast from the probe reveals a Martian canal and wildlife and then, startlingly, the arrival of human-like Martians in a "land ship" who haul the probe off.

== Notes ==
During his Guest of Honor speech, Theodore Sturgeon expressed regret that Hugo Award winner Robert A. Heinlein could not attend. Heinlein, at that moment, walked into the ballroom, in a white tux, saying that Ted's regret for his nonattendance was premature. He went to the podium, and Sturgeon offered him a sip from a water glass, asking Heinlein to share water with him (a reference to Stranger in a Strange Land.) Heinlein and Sturgeon shared water.

Before the convention, in 1961, chairman Earl Kemp wrote to Isaac Asimov relaying that someone had jokingly suggested that Asimov deliver a pseudo-lecture on the theme "The Positive Power of Posterior Pinching" and offered that the convention would "furnish some suitable posteriors for demonstration purposes." At that time Asimov was well known, but not ostracized, for groping female congoers. Asimov responded, "I have no doubt I could give a stimulating talk that would stiffen the manly fiber of every one in the audience." However, he noted, "I will have to ask the permission of various people who are (or would be) concerned in the matter. If they say 'no', it will be 'no.'" The suggested pseudo-lecture did not occur.

== See also ==
- Hugo Award
- Science fiction
- Speculative fiction
- World Science Fiction Society
- Worldcon

Preceded by 19th World Science Fiction Convention; Seacon in Seattle, Washington, United States (1961)	List of Worldcons; 20th World Science Fiction Convention; Chicon III in Chicago, Illinois, United States (1962)	Succeeded by 21st World Science Fiction Convention; Discon I in Washington, D.C., United States (1963)
