= 18th World Science Fiction Convention =

18th Worldcon (1960)

Pittcon, the 18th World Science Fiction Convention
- Genre: Science fiction
- Dates: 3–5 September 1960
- Venue: Penn-Sheraton Hotel
- Location: Pittsburgh, Pennsylvania
- Country: United States
- Attendance: 568

The 18th World Science Fiction Convention (Worldcon), also known as Pittcon, was held on 3–5 September 1960 at the Penn-Sheraton Hotel in Pittsburgh, Pennsylvania, United States.

The convention was chaired by Dirce Archer.

== Participants ==
Attendance was 568.

=== Guests of honor ===
- James Blish
- Isaac Asimov (toastmaster)

== Awards ==
The World Science Fiction Society administers and presents the Hugo Awards, the oldest and most noteworthy award for science fiction. Selection of the recipients is by vote of the Worldcon members. Categories include novels and short fiction, artwork, dramatic presentations, and various professional and fandom activities.

Other awards may be presented at Worldcon at the discretion of the individual convention committee. This has often included the national SF awards of the host country, such as the Japanese Seiun Awards as part of Nippon 2007, and the Prix Aurora Awards as part of Anticipation in 2009. The Astounding Award for Best New Writer and the Sidewise Award, though not sponsored by the Worldcon, are usually presented, as well as the Chesley Awards, the Prometheus Award, and others. In 2021, the Nommo Awards began presenting at Worldcon.

=== 1960 Hugo Awards ===
- Best Novel: Starship Troopers by Robert A. Heinlein
- Best Short Fiction: "Flowers for Algernon" by Daniel Keyes
- Best Dramatic Presentation: The Twilight Zone
- Best Professional Magazine: The Magazine of Fantasy & Science Fiction edited by Robert P. Mills
- Best Professional Artist: Ed Emshwiller
- Best Fanzine: Cry of the Nameless by F. M. Busby, Elinor Busby, Burnett Toskey, and Wally Weber

=== Other awards ===
- Special Award: Hugo Gernsback as "The Father of Magazine Science Fiction"

== See also ==
- Hugo Award
- Science fiction
- Speculative fiction
- World Science Fiction Society
- Worldcon

Preceded by 17th World Science Fiction Convention; Detention in Detroit, Michigan, United States (1959)	List of Worldcons; 18th World Science Fiction Convention; Pittcon in Pittsburgh, Pennsylvania, United States (1960)	Succeeded by 19th World Science Fiction Convention; Seacon in Seattle, Washington, United States (1961)
