= 59th World Science Fiction Convention =

59th Worldcon (2001)

The Millennium Philcon, the 59th World Science Fiction Convention
- Genre: Science fiction
- Dates: 30 August–3 September 2001
- Venue: Pennsylvania Convention Center; Philadelphia Marriott Hotel
- Location: Philadelphia, Pennsylvania
- Country: United States
- Attendance: 4,592
- Filing status: Non-profit
- Website: 2001.worldcon.org

The 59th World Science Fiction Convention (Worldcon), also known as The Millennium Philcon, was held on 30 August–3 September 2001 at the Pennsylvania Convention Center and Philadelphia Marriott Hotel in Philadelphia, Pennsylvania, United States.

== Participants ==
Attendance was 4,592, out of 6,288 paid memberships. Of those, 933 were supporting memberships and 6 were kids-in-tow.

=== Guests of honor ===
- Greg Bear (author)
- Stephen Youll (artist)
- Gardner Dozois (editor)
- George Scithers (fan)
- Esther Friesner (toastmaster)

Greg Bear talked about how common many of the tropes of science fiction have become, and how this is an encouraging sign of the mainstream acceptance of science fiction. He also spoke of his father-in-law, the late Poul Anderson.

Gardner Dozois said the science fiction field had endured many boom and bust cycles before, and pointed out that historically, science fiction of today was freed from many of the unfortunate prejudices and restraints that it has had in the past.

=== Other program participants ===
Forrest J. Ackerman
Catherine Asaro
Gregory Benford
David Brin
Algis Budrys
Lois McMaster Bujold
Pat Cadigan
Orson Scott Card
Jack L. Chalker
David Cherry
Greg Costikyan
Cecilia Dart-Thornton
Ellen Datlow

Bob Eggleton
Leslie Fish
Craig Shaw Gardner
Richard Garfinkle
Joe Haldeman
David G. Hartwell
Nalo Hopkinson
Steve Jackson
Nancy Kress
Ellen Kushner
Geoffrey A. Landis
Don Maitz

George R. R. Martin
Elizabeth Moon
Patrick Nielsen Hayden
Larry Niven
Frederik Pohl
Mike Resnick
Robert J. Sawyer
Darrell Schweitzer
Robert Silverberg
Norman Spinrad
Nancy Springer
S. M. Stirling

Lois Tilton
Harry Turtledove
Mary Turzillo
Gordon Van Gelder
Jo Walton
Lawrence Watt-Evans
Len Wein
Michael Whelan
Walter Jon Williams

== Programming and events ==
440 people participated in 530 panel discussions, dialogues, slide shows, autograph session, and readings. The panel on "The State of Science Fiction Publishing Today" took a troubling look at the publishing industry as a whole. There was much concern about mass market paperbacks, the catastrophic reduction in the number of book distributors from about 300 to three, and the high percentage of books returned unsold. On the panel "The Science Fiction Short Story Today" it was noted that even famous short story magazines are seeing declining circulation.

=== Art show ===
The art show had a great variety of science fiction and fantasy oriented art. Free docent tours were led by professional artists. The Art Show Award for Best in Show was awarded to Bob Eggleton's "Quimeartha's Dream 1 & 2".

=== Masquerade ===
The Masquerade was held Saturday evening. There were 31 competitors. Several very large dragons impressed the audience. The winning entry for Best In Show was "Fridays at Ten," a skit of several Twilight Zone episodes done in black, white, and grey costumes. "The H-Mercs" won Best Workmanship for their spectacular mechanical dragon. Intermission entertainment was supplied by Harmonytryx, a female a cappella group.

Naturally, there were many "hall costumes" as well worn throughout the con, including Centauri, Klingons, and a young Princess Ozma.

== Awards ==
The World Science Fiction Society administers and presents the Hugo Awards, the oldest and most noteworthy award for science fiction. Selection of the recipients is by vote of the Worldcon members. Categories include novels and short fiction, artwork, dramatic presentations, and various professional and fandom activities.

Other awards may be presented at Worldcon at the discretion of the individual convention committee. This has often included the national SF awards of the host country, such as the Japanese Seiun Awards as part of Nippon 2007, and the Prix Aurora Awards as part of Anticipation in 2009. The Astounding Award for Best New Writer and the Sidewise Award, though not sponsored by the Worldcon, are usually presented, as well as the Chesley Awards, the Prometheus Award, and others. In 2021, the Nommo Awards began presenting at Worldcon.

=== 2001 Hugo Awards ===
- Best Novel: Harry Potter and the Goblet of Fire by J. K. Rowling
- Best Novella: "The Ultimate Earth" by Jack Williamson (Analog, December 2000)
- Best Novelette: "Millennium Babies" by Kristine Kathryn Rusch (Asimov's, January 2000)
- Best Short Story: "Different Kinds of Darkness" by David Langford (F & SF, January 2000)
- Best Related Book: Greetings from Earth: The Art of Bob Eggleton by Bob Eggleton and Nigel Suckling (Paper Tiger)
- Best Dramatic Presentation: Crouching Tiger, Hidden Dragon
- Best Professional Editor: Gardner Dozois
- Best Professional Artist: Bob Eggleton
- Best Semiprozine: Locus, edited by Charles N. Brown
- Best Fanzine: File 770, edited by Mike Glyer
- Best Fan Writer: Dave Langford
- Best Fan Artist: Teddy Harvia

=== Other awards ===
- John W. Campbell Award for Best New Writer: Kristine Smith

=== 1951 Retro Hugo Awards ===
- Best Novel: Farmer in the Sky by Robert A. Heinlein
- Best Novella: The Man Who Sold the Moon by Robert A. Heinlein (The Man Who Sold the Moon, Shasta Publishers)
- Best Novelette: "The Little Black Bag" by C. M. Kornbluth (Astounding Science Fiction, July 1950)
- Best Short Story: "To Serve Man" by Damon Knight (Galaxy, November 1950)
- Best Dramatic Presentation: Destination Moon
- Best Professional Editor: John W. Campbell, Jr.
- Best Professional Artist: Frank Kelly Freas
- Best Fanzine: Science Fiction Newsletter
- Best Fan Writer: Bob Silverberg
- Best Fan Artist: Jack Gaughan

== Future site selection ==
Boston, Massachusetts won the bid for the 62nd World Science Fiction Convention to be held in 2004.

== Notes ==
The pocket program for the 2001 World Science Fiction Convention

Many commentators spoke of the outsize the Philadelphia Convention Center. Despite the convention being sizable, "attendees seemed to rattle around the oversize room." 115 individual dealers sold goods at 258 tables in the dealers' room. Dealers reported good sales, but there was some confusion about tax laws and last-minute license charges which upset some dealers. Darrell Schweitzer said: "Imagine a convention held in a zeppelin hangar—designed for multiple zeppelins—and you will begin to get the idea... [There was] enough airspace to fly a small plane indoors."

A large exhibit of historical Worldcon artifacts was spread across the exhibit hall. There were photographs and clippings from NyCon I, held in New York City in 1939, as well as Hugo Awards, mugs, medallions, program books, t-shirts and the like from more recent conventions.

A nearby Christian convention, "For His Glory", was held simultaneously. Several attendees of that convention were disturbed by fans dressed up as demons and the like. They disrupted several panels and convention registration by singing hymns until Security was called to escort them away.

Philadelphia's Chinatown is immediately outside the convention center, and many budget-conscious attendees ate Chinese food rather than the expensive hotel fare that weekend.

On Saturday "The Junkyard Wars" were held in some of the spare space in the exhibit hall. Ten teams of six people tried to build mechanisms from whatever they could find to propel a raw egg over a barrier as far as they could without it breaking. The winning team received "a rosette and a trophy made from junk found in the hotel basement that morning."

== See also ==
- Hugo Award
- Science fiction
- Speculative fiction
- World Science Fiction Society
- Worldcon

Preceded by 58th World Science Fiction Convention; Chicon 2000 in Chicago, Illinois, United States (2000)	List of Worldcons; 59th World Science Fiction Convention; Millennium Philcon in Philadelphia, Pennsylvania, United States (2001)	Succeeded by 60th World Science Fiction Convention; ConJose in San Jose, California, United States (2002)
