= 23rd World Science Fiction Convention =

23rd Worldcon (1965)

Loncon II, the 23rd World Science Fiction Convention
- Genre: Science fiction
- Dates: 27–30 August 1965
- Venue: Mount Royal Hotel
- Location: London
- Country: United Kingdom
- Attendance: ~350
- Filing status: Non-profit

The 23rd World Science Fiction Convention (Worldcon), also known as Loncon II, was held on 27–30 August 1965 at the Mount Royal Hotel in London, United Kingdom. It was the second Worldcon to be held in London, following the original Loncon in 1957.

The chairman was Ella Parker.

== Participants ==
Attendance was approximately 350.

=== Guests of Honour ===
- Brian W. Aldiss
- Tom Boardman (toastmaster)

== Awards ==
The World Science Fiction Society administers and presents the Hugo Awards, the oldest and most noteworthy award for science fiction. Selection of the recipients is by vote of the Worldcon members. Categories include novels and short fiction, artwork, dramatic presentations, and various professional and fandom activities.

Other awards may be presented at Worldcon at the discretion of the individual convention committee. This has often included the national SF awards of the host country, such as the Japanese Seiun Awards as part of Nippon 2007, and the Prix Aurora Awards as part of Anticipation in 2009. The Astounding Award for Best New Writer and the Sidewise Award, though not sponsored by the Worldcon, are usually presented, as well as the Chesley Awards, the Prometheus Award, and others. In 2021, the Nommo Awards began presenting at Worldcon.

=== 1965 Hugo Awards ===
- Best Novel: The Wanderer by Fritz Leiber
- Best Short Story: "Soldier, Ask Not" by Gordon R. Dickson
- Best Dramatic Presentation: Dr. Strangelove
- Best Professional Artist: John Schoenherr
- Best Professional Magazine: Analog
- Best Fanzine: Yandro edited by Robert and Juanita Coulson
- Publisher: Ballantine Books

== See also ==
- Hugo Award
- Science fiction
- Speculative fiction
- World Science Fiction Society
- Worldcon

Preceded by 22nd World Science Fiction Convention; Pacificon II in Oakland, California, United States (1964)	List of Worldcons; 23rd World Science Fiction Convention; Loncon II in London, UK (1965)	Succeeded by 24th World Science Fiction Convention; Tricon in Cleveland, Ohio, United States (1966)
