= 36th World Science Fiction Convention =

36th Worldcon (1978)

IguanaCon II, the 36th World Science Fiction Convention
- Genre: Science fiction
- Dates: 30 August–4 September 1978
- Venue: Hyatt Regency Phoenix, Adams House, Phoenix Convention Center, Phoenix Symphony Hall
- Location: Phoenix, Arizona
- Country: United States
- Attendance: ~4,700
- Filing status: non-profit

The 36th World Science Fiction Convention (Worldcon), also known as IguanaCon II, was held on 30 August–4 September 1978 at the Hyatt Regency Phoenix, Adams House, Phoenix Convention Center, and Phoenix Symphony Hall in Phoenix, Arizona, United States. Despite the name, this was the first "IguanaCon".

The original committee chairman was Greg Brown, who served for the first eighteen months of the convention committee's existence; he was replaced for the final six months prior to the convention and during the convention itself by Tim Kyger. Gary Farber was the de facto vice-chairman as well as director of operations during the convention.

== Participants ==
Attendance was approximately 4,700.

=== Guests of honor ===
- Harlan Ellison (pro)
- Bill Bowers (fan)
- F. M. Busby (toastmaster)

Josef Nesvadba had been announced as the European guest of honor, but he could not get travel papers and so did not attend.

== Awards ==
The World Science Fiction Society administers and presents the Hugo Awards, the oldest and most noteworthy award for science fiction. Selection of the recipients is by vote of the Worldcon members. Categories include novels and short fiction, artwork, dramatic presentations, and various professional and fandom activities.

Other awards may be presented at Worldcon at the discretion of the individual convention committee. This has often included the national SF awards of the host country, such as the Japanese Seiun Awards as part of Nippon 2007, and the Prix Aurora Awards as part of Anticipation in 2009. The Astounding Award for Best New Writer and the Sidewise Award, though not sponsored by the Worldcon, are usually presented, as well as the Chesley Awards, the Prometheus Award, and others. In 2021, the Nommo Awards began presenting at Worldcon.

=== 1978 Hugo Awards ===
- Best Novel: Gateway by Frederik Pohl
- Best Novella: "Stardance" by Spider and Jeanne Robinson
- Best Novelette: "Eyes of Amber" by Joan D. Vinge
- Best Short Story: "Jeffty Is Five" by Harlan Ellison
- Best Dramatic Presentation: Star Wars
- Best Professional Editor: George H. Scithers
- Best Professional Artist: Rick Sternbach
- Best Amateur Magazine: Locus, edited by Charles N. Brown and Dena Brown
- Best Fan Writer: Richard E. Geis
- Best Fan Artist: Phil Foglio

=== Other awards ===
- Gandalf Awards
  - Gandalf Grand Master Award: Poul Anderson
  - Gandalf Award for Book-Length Fantasy: The Silmarillion by J. R. R. Tolkien (edited by Christopher Tolkien)
- John W. Campbell Award for Best New Writer: Orson Scott Card

== See also ==
- Hugo Award
- Science fiction
- Speculative fiction
- World Science Fiction Society
- Worldcon

Preceded by 35th World Science Fiction Convention; SunCon in Miami Beach, Florida, United States (1977)	List of Worldcons; 36th World Science Fiction Convention; IguanaCon II in Phoenix, Arizona, United States (1978)	Succeeded by 37th World Science Fiction Convention; Seacon '79 in Brighton, UK (1979)
