= 46th World Science Fiction Convention =

46th Worldcon (1988)

Nolacon II, the 46th World Science Fiction Convention
- Genre: Science fiction
- Dates: 1–5 September 1988
- Venue: Municipal Auditorium
- Location: New Orleans, Louisiana
- Country: United States
- Attendance: 5,300
- Filing status: non-profit

The 46th World Science Fiction Convention (Worldcon), also known as Nolacon II, was held on 1–5 September 1988 at the Marriott, Sheraton, and International Hotels, and the New Orleans Municipal Auditorium in New Orleans, Louisiana, United States.

The chairman was John H. Guidry.

== Participants ==
Attendance was approximately 5,300.

=== Guests of honor ===
- Donald A. Wollheim (pro)
- Roger Sims (fan)
- Mike Resnick (toastmaster)

== Awards ==
The World Science Fiction Society administers and presents the Hugo Awards, the oldest and most noteworthy award for science fiction. Selection of the recipients is by vote of the Worldcon members. Categories include novels and short fiction, artwork, dramatic presentations, and various professional and fandom activities.

Other awards may be presented at Worldcon at the discretion of the individual convention committee. This has often included the national SF awards of the host country, such as the Japanese Seiun Awards as part of Nippon 2007, and the Prix Aurora Awards as part of Anticipation in 2009. The Astounding Award for Best New Writer and the Sidewise Award, though not sponsored by the Worldcon, are usually presented, as well as the Chesley Awards, the Prometheus Award, and others. In 2021, the Nommo Awards began presenting at Worldcon.

=== 1988 Hugo Awards ===
- Best Novel: The Uplift War by David Brin
- Best Novella: "Eye for Eye" by Orson Scott Card
- Best Novelette: "Buffalo Gals, Won't You Come Out Tonight" by Ursula K. Le Guin
- Best Short Story: "Why I Left Harry's All-Night Hamburgers" by Lawrence Watt-Evans
- Best Non-Fiction Book: Michael Whelan's Works of Wonder by Michael Whelan
- Other Forms: Watchmen by Alan Moore and Dave Gibbons
- Best Dramatic Presentation: The Princess Bride
- Best Professional Editor: Gardner Dozois
- Best Professional Artist: Michael Whelan
- Best Semiprozine: Locus, edited by Charles N. Brown
- Best Fanzine: Texas SF Inquirer, edited by Pat Mueller
- Best Fan Writer: Mike Glyer
- Best Fan Artist: Brad Foster

=== Other awards ===
- Special Award: The SF Oral History Association
- John W. Campbell Award for Best New Writer: Judith Moffett

== See also ==
- Hugo Award
- Science fiction
- Speculative fiction
- World Science Fiction Society
- Worldcon

Preceded by 45th World Science Fiction Convention; Conspiracy '87 in Brighton, UK (1987)	List of Worldcons; 46th World Science Fiction Convention; Nolacon II in New Orleans, Louisiana, United States (1988)	Succeeded by 47th World Science Fiction Convention; Noreascon 3 in Boston, Massachusetts, United States (1989)
