= 24th World Science Fiction Convention =

24th Worldcon (1966)

Tricon, the 24th World Science Fiction Convention
- Genre: Science fiction
- Dates: 1–5 September 1966
- Venue: Sheraton Cleveland
- Location: Cleveland, Ohio
- Country: United States
- Attendance: ~850
- Filing status: Non-profit

The 24th World Science Fiction Convention (Worldcon), also known as Tricon, was held on 1–5 September 1966 at the Sheraton-Cleveland in Cleveland, Ohio, United States. Officially, the convention was hosted by three cities in the region: Cincinnati, Ohio, Cleveland, Ohio, and Detroit, Michigan; hence the name "Tricon".

The three co-chairmen of that Worldcon each represented their city's fandom; they were Ben Jason of Cleveland, Howard DeVore of Detroit, and Lou Tabakow of Cincinnati.

== Participants ==
Attendance was approximately 850.

=== Guests of honor ===
- L. Sprague de Camp
- Isaac Asimov (toastmaster)

== Programming and events ==
At the convention, Gene Roddenberry premiered both pilot episodes, "The Cage" and "Where No Man Has Gone Before", for his upcoming NBC TV series Star Trek.

== Awards ==
The World Science Fiction Society administers and presents the Hugo Awards, the oldest and most noteworthy award for science fiction. Selection of the recipients is by vote of the Worldcon members. Categories include novels and short fiction, artwork, dramatic presentations, and various professional and fandom activities.

Other awards may be presented at Worldcon at the discretion of the individual convention committee. This has often included the national SF awards of the host country, such as the Japanese Seiun Awards as part of Nippon 2007, and the Prix Aurora Awards as part of Anticipation in 2009. The Astounding Award for Best New Writer and the Sidewise Award, though not sponsored by the Worldcon, are usually presented, as well as the Chesley Awards, the Prometheus Award, and others. In 2021, the Nommo Awards began presenting at Worldcon.

=== 1966 Hugo Awards ===
- Best Novel (tie):
  - ...And Call Me Conrad by Roger Zelazny
  - Dune by Frank Herbert
- Best Short Fiction: "'Repent, Harlequin!' Said the Ticktockman" by Harlan Ellison
- Best Professional Artist: Frank Frazetta
- Best Professional Magazine: if
- Best Amateur Magazine: ERB-dom edited by Camille Cazedessus, Jr.
- Best All-Time Series: the Foundation series by Isaac Asimov

== See also ==
- Hugo Award
- Science fiction
- Speculative fiction
- World Science Fiction Society
- Worldcon

Preceded by 23rd World Science Fiction Convention; Loncon II in London, UK (1965)	List of Worldcons; 24th World Science Fiction Convention; Tricon in Cleveland, Ohio, United States (1966)	Succeeded by 25th World Science Fiction Convention; NyCon 3 in New York City, United States (1967)
