= 21st World Science Fiction Convention =

21st Worldcon (1963)

Discon I, the 21st World Science Fiction Convention
- Genre: Science fiction
- Dates: 31 August – 2 September 1963
- Venue: Statler-Hilton Hotel
- Location: Washington, D.C.
- Country: United States
- Attendance: ~600
- Filing status: non-profit

The 21st World Science Fiction Convention (Worldcon), also known as Discon I, was held on 31 August through 2 September 1963 at the Statler-Hilton Hotel in Washington, D.C., United States.

The chairman was George Scithers.

== Participants ==
Attendance was approximately 600.

=== Guests of honor ===
- Murray Leinster
- Isaac Asimov (toastmaster)

== Programming and events ==
Following the convention, Advent:Publishers published The Proceedings: Discon, edited by Richard Eney. The book includes transcripts of lectures and panels given during the course of the convention and includes numerous photographs as well.

== Awards ==
The World Science Fiction Society administers and presents the Hugo Awards, the oldest and most noteworthy award for science fiction. Selection of the recipients is by vote of the Worldcon members. Categories include novels and short fiction, artwork, dramatic presentations, and various professional and fandom activities.

Other awards may be presented at Worldcon at the discretion of the individual convention committee. This has often included the national SF awards of the host country, such as the Japanese Seiun Awards as part of Nippon 2007, and the Prix Aurora Awards as part of Anticipation in 2009. The Astounding Award for Best New Writer and the Sidewise Award, though not sponsored by the Worldcon, are usually presented, as well as the Chesley Awards, the Prometheus Award, and others. In 2021, the Nommo Awards began presenting at Worldcon.

=== 1963 Hugo Awards ===
- Best Novel: The Man in the High Castle by Philip K. Dick
- Best Fiction: "The Dragon Masters" by Jack Vance
- Best Professional Artist: Roy G. Krenkel
- Best Professional Magazine: Fantasy & Science Fiction
- Best Amateur Magazine: Xero, edited by Richard and Pat Lupoff

=== Other awards ===
- Special Award: P. Schuyler Miller for book reviews in Analog magazine
- Special Award: Isaac Asimov for science articles in Fantasy & Science Fiction
- First Fandom Hall of Fame: E. E. "Doc" Smith

== See also ==
- Hugo Award
- Science fiction
- Speculative fiction
- World Science Fiction Society
- Worldcon

Preceded by 20th World Science Fiction Convention; Chicon III in Chicago, Illinois, United States (1962)	List of Worldcons; 21st World Science Fiction Convention; Discon I in Washington, D.C., United States (1963)	Succeeded by 22nd World Science Fiction Convention; Pacificon II in Oakland, California, United States (1964)
