= 49th World Science Fiction Convention =

49th Worldcon (1991)

Chicon V, the 49th World Science Fiction Convention
- Genre: Science fiction
- Dates: 29 August–2 September 1991
- Venue: Hyatt Regency Chicago
- Location: Chicago, Illinois
- Country: United States
- Attendance: 5,661
- Filing status: 501(c)(3) non-profit

The 49th World Science Fiction Convention (Worldcon), also known as Chicon V, was held on 29 August–2 September 1991 at the Hyatt Regency in Chicago, Illinois, United States.

The convention was chaired by Kathleen Meyer.

== Participants ==
Attendance was 5,661.

=== Guests of honor ===
- Hal Clement (pro)
- Martin H. Greenberg (pro)
- Richard Powers (pro)
- Jon & Joni Stopa (fan)
- Marta Randall (toastmaster)

=== Other notable program participants ===
Other participants included author Clive Barker and psychologist Timothy Leary.

== Awards ==
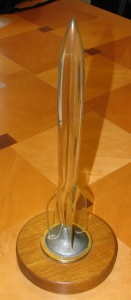
1991 Hugo Award

The World Science Fiction Society administers and presents the Hugo Awards, the oldest and most noteworthy award for science fiction. Selection of the recipients is by vote of the Worldcon members. Categories include novels and short fiction, artwork, dramatic presentations, and various professional and fandom activities.

Other awards may be presented at Worldcon at the discretion of the individual convention committee. This has often included the national SF awards of the host country, such as the Japanese Seiun Awards as part of Nippon 2007, and the Prix Aurora Awards as part of Anticipation in 2009. The Astounding Award for Best New Writer and the Sidewise Award, though not sponsored by the Worldcon, are usually presented, as well as the Chesley Awards, the Prometheus Award, and others. In 2021, the Nommo Awards began presenting at Worldcon.

=== 1991 Hugo Awards ===
- Best Novel: The Vor Game by Lois McMaster Bujold
- Best Novella: "The Hemingway Hoax" by Joe Haldeman
- Best Novelette: "The Manamouki" by Mike Resnick
- Best Short Story: "Bears Discover Fire" by Terry Bisson
- Best Non-Fiction Book: How to Write Science Fiction and Fantasy by Orson Scott Card
- Best Dramatic Presentation: Edward Scissorhands
- Best Professional Editor: Gardner Dozois
- Best Professional Artist: Michael Whelan
- Best Semiprozine: Locus, edited by Charles N. Brown
- Best Fanzine: Lan's Lantern, edited by George Laskowski
- Best Fan Writer: Dave Langford
- Best Fan Artist: Teddy Harvia

=== Other awards ===
- Special Award: Andrew I. Porter for many years of excellence in editing Science Fiction Chronicle
- Special Award: Elst Weinstein for starting up and continuing the Hugos
- John W. Campbell Award for Best New Writer: Julia Ecklar

== See also ==
- Hugo Award
- Science fiction
- Speculative fiction
- World Science Fiction Society
- Worldcon

Preceded by 48th World Science Fiction Convention; ConFiction in The Hague, Netherlands (1990)	List of Worldcons; 49th World Science Fiction Convention; Chicon V in Chicago, Illinois, United States (1991)	Succeeded by 50th World Science Fiction Convention; MagiCon in Orlando, Florida, United States (1992)
