= 9th World Science Fiction Convention =

9th Worldcon (1951)

Nolacon I, the 9th World Science Fiction Convention
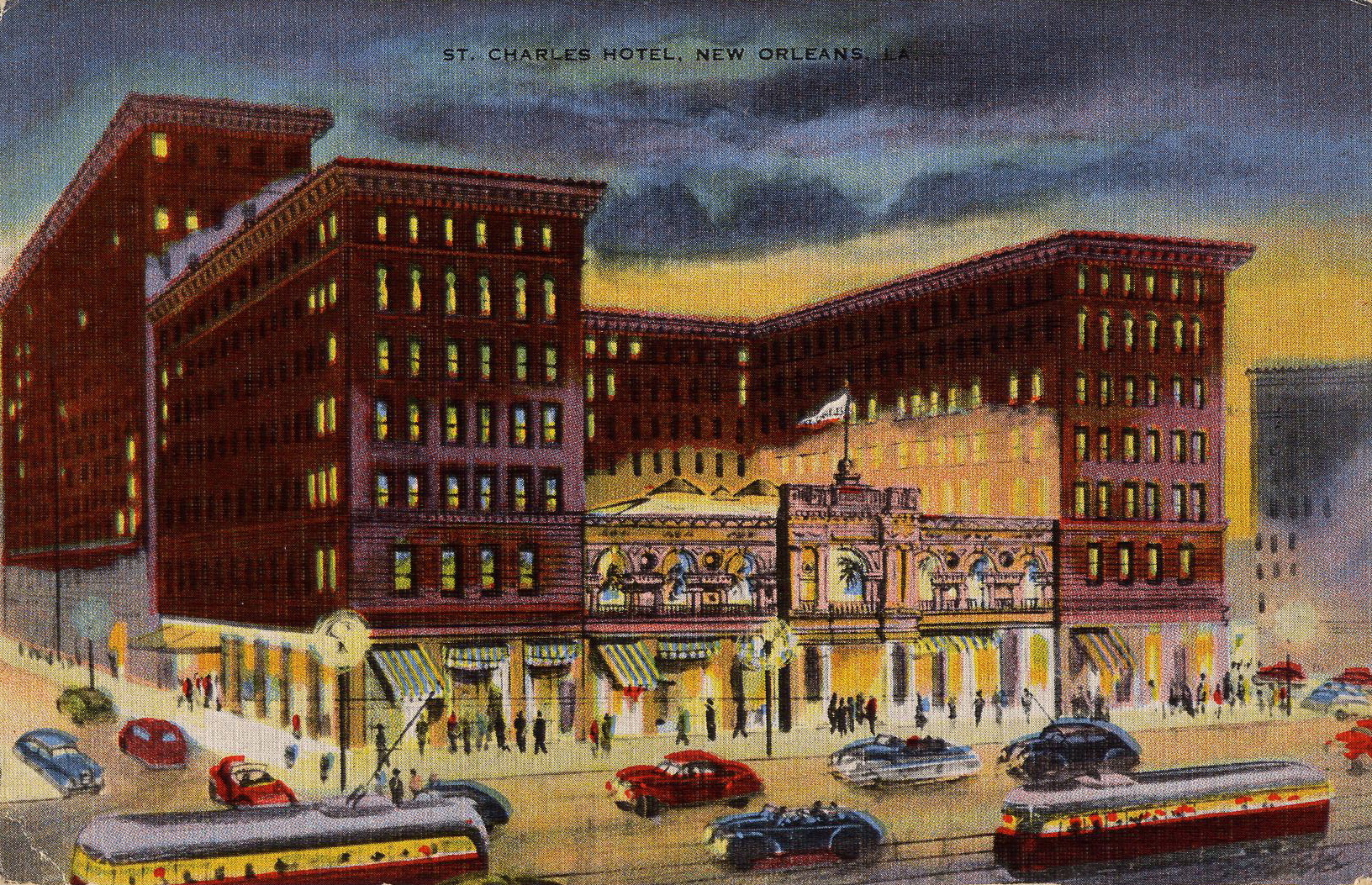
- St. Charles Hotel, New Orleans
- Genre: Science fiction
- Dates: 1–3 September 1951
- Venue: St. Charles Hotel
- Location: New Orleans, Louisiana
- Country: United States
- Attendance: ~190
- Filing status: non-profit

The 9th World Science Fiction Convention (Worldcon), also known as Nolacon I, was held 1–3 September 1951 at the St. Charles Hotel in New Orleans, Louisiana, United States.

The chairman was Harry B. Moore.

== Participants ==
Attendance was approximately 190.

Pros attending included Robert Bloch, Fredric Brown, Judith Merril, E.E. Smith, L. Sprague de Camp, editor John W. Campbell and fantasy artist Hannes Bok, who did Nolacon's program book cover. Famous fans present included Sam Moskowitz, Wilson Tucker (a.k.a. Bob Tucker), Dave Kyle, Roger Sims, Terry Carr, and Lee Hoffman. The latter, editor of the famous fanzine Quandry, whom everyone assumed was male, turned out to be a young woman, a ‘revelation’ which greatly startled even those who had corresponded with her.

The at-the-door membership price was US$1, the same price charged from the 1st through the 12th Worldcon.

=== Guests of honor ===
- Fritz Leiber

== Programming and events ==
Notable events included world premiere screenings of The Day The Earth Stood Still and When Worlds Collide, plus a continuous two-day-long party in Room 770 at the St. Charles Hotel that became legendary following the convention not only for its duration but for its high quality. Mike Glyer's long-running newszine File 770, named in commemoration of this party, has won the Hugo Award for Best Fanzine a number of times.

== Awards ==
A "Certificate of Merit" was presented to representatives of The Day the Earth Stood Still by the Nolacon I chairman, and this was reported on Movietone News at the time.

=== 1951 Retro Hugo Awards ===
Hugo Awards were not presented at this Worldcon as the awards were not proposed until the following year, 1952, with the first Hugos actually presented in 1953 at the 11th World Science Fiction Convention. However, in 2001 at the 59th World Science Fiction Convention held in Philadelphia, a set of Retro Hugo Awards were presented to honor work that would have been Hugo-eligible had the award existed in 1951:

- Best Novel: Farmer in the Sky by Robert A. Heinlein
- Best Novella: The Man Who Sold the Moon by Robert A. Heinlein (The Man Who Sold the Moon, Shasta Publishers)
- Best Novelette: "The Little Black Bag" by C. M. Kornbluth (Astounding Science Fiction, July 1950)
- Best Short Story: "To Serve Man" by Damon Knight (Galaxy, November 1950)
- Best Dramatic Presentation: Destination Moon
- Best Professional Editor: John W. Campbell, Jr.
- Best Professional Artist: Frank Kelly Freas
- Best Fanzine: Science Fiction Newsletter
- Best Fan Writer: Bob Silverberg
- Best Fan Artist: Jack Gaughan

== In fiction ==
Nolacon is a plot point in The Case of the Little Green Men, the first novel by Mack Reynolds, which is set in part at "AnnCon", a fictional version of the 10th World Science Fiction Convention held in 1952. The real 10th Worldcon, held in Chicago, had no actual name like "AnnCon", being simply called, in its own publications, "the 10th Annual World Science Fiction Convention" (and once as "the 10th Annual Science Fiction Convention," likely a dropped-word linotype operator's typo). Before and during the convention, its attendees often referred to it as "Chicon II," an unofficial nickname that stuck to this Chicago Worldcon in the decades that followed.

== See also ==
- Hugo Award
- Science fiction
- Speculative fiction
- World Science Fiction Society
- Worldcon

Preceded by 8th World Science Fiction Convention; NorWesCon in Portland, Oregon, United States (1950)	List of Worldcons; 9th World Science Fiction Convention; Nolacon I in New Orleans, Louisiana, United States (1951)	Succeeded by 10th World Science Fiction Convention; Chicon II in Chicago, Illinois, United States (1952)
