= 7th World Science Fiction Convention =

7th Worldcon (1949)

Cinvention, the 7th World Science Fiction Convention
- Genre: Science fiction
- Dates: 3–5 September 1949
- Venue: Hotel Metropole
- Location: Cincinnati, Ohio
- Country: United States
- Attendance: ~190

The 7th World Science Fiction Convention (Worldcon), also known as Cinvention, was held on 3–5 September 1949 at the Hotel Metropole in Cincinnati, Ohio, United States.

Don Ford carried out the duties of chairman, but was officially Secretary-Treasurer; Charles R. Tanner had the honorary title of chairman.

== Participants ==
Attendance was approximately 190.

Noteworthy attendees included Forrest J. Ackerman, Hannes Bok, Lester del Rey. Vince Hamlin. Sam Moskowitz, Rog Phillips, Milton Rothman, "Doc" Smith, and George O. Smith.

=== Guests of honor ===
- Lloyd A. Eshbach (pro)
- Ted Carnell (fan)

== See also ==
- Hugo Award
- Science fiction
- Speculative fiction
- World Science Fiction Society
- Worldcon

Preceded by 6th World Science Fiction Convention; Torcon I in Toronto, Ontario, Canada (1948)	List of Worldcons; 7th World Science Fiction Convention; Cinvention in Cincinnati, Ohio, United States (1949)	Succeeded by 8th World Science Fiction Convention; NorWesCon in Portland, Oregon, United States (1950)
