= 45th World Science Fiction Convention =

45th Worldcon (1987)

Conspiracy '87, the 45th World Science Fiction Convention
- Genre: Science fiction
- Dates: 27 August–1 September 1987
- Venue: Metropole Hotel and The Brighton Centre
- Location: Brighton
- Country: United Kingdom
- Attendance: 4,009
- Filing status: non-profit

The 45th World Science Fiction Convention (Worldcon), also known as Conspiracy '87, was held on 27 August–1 September 1987 at the Metropole Hotel and The Brighton Centre in Brighton, United Kingdom.

The initial chairman was Malcolm Edwards, who had to scale back his involvement several months before the con, and was succeeded by Paul Oldroyd with the title of "coordinator", later recognised as chairman.

== Participants ==
Attendance was 4,009, out of 5,425 paid memberships.

=== Guests of Honour ===
- Doris Lessing (UK)
- Alfred Bester (US) (did not attend, due to poor health)
- Arkady Strugatsky and Boris Strugatsky (USSR)
- Jim Burns (artist)
- Ray Harryhausen (film)
- Joyce Slater & Ken Slater (fan)
- David Langford (special fan)
- Brian W. Aldiss (toastmaster)

== Awards ==
The World Science Fiction Society administers and presents the Hugo Awards, the oldest and most noteworthy award for science fiction. Selection of the recipients is by vote of the Worldcon members. Categories include novels and short fiction, artwork, dramatic presentations, and various professional and fandom activities.

Other awards may be presented at Worldcon at the discretion of the individual convention committee. This has often included the national SF awards of the host country, such as the Japanese Seiun Awards as part of Nippon 2007, and the Prix Aurora Awards as part of Anticipation in 2009. The Astounding Award for Best New Writer and the Sidewise Award, though not sponsored by the Worldcon, are usually presented, as well as the Chesley Awards, the Prometheus Award, and others. In 2021, the Nommo Awards began presenting at Worldcon.

=== 1987 Hugo Awards ===
- Best Novel: Speaker for the Dead by Orson Scott Card
- Best Novella: "Gilgamesh in the Outback" by Robert Silverberg
- Best Novelette: "Permafrost" by Roger Zelazny
- Best Short Story: "Tangents" by Greg Bear
- Best Non-Fiction Book: Trillion Year Spree by Brian Aldiss with David Wingrove
- Best Dramatic Presentation: Aliens
- Best Semiprozine: Locus, edited by Charles N. Brown
- Best Professional Editor: Terry Carr
- Best Professional Artist: Jim Burns
- Best Fanzine: Ansible, edited by Dave Langford
- Best Fan Writer: Dave Langford
- Best Fan Artist: Brad Foster

=== Other awards ===
- John W. Campbell Award for Best New Writer: Karen Joy Fowler

== See also ==
- Hugo Award
- Science fiction
- Speculative fiction
- World Science Fiction Society
- Worldcon

Preceded by 44th World Science Fiction Convention; ConFederation in Atlanta, Georgia, United States (1986)	List of Worldcons; 45th World Science Fiction Convention; Conspiracy '87 in Brighton, UK (1987)	Succeeded by 46th World Science Fiction Convention; Nolacon II in New Orleans, Louisiana, United States (1988)
