= 25th World Science Fiction Convention =

25th Worldcon (1967)

NyCon 3, the 25th World Science Fiction Convention
- Genre: Science fiction
- Dates: 31 August–4 September 1967
- Venue: Statler Hilton Hotel
- Location: New York City
- Country: United States
- Attendance: ~1,500
- Filing status: non-profit

The 25th World Science Fiction Convention (Worldcon), also known as NyCon 3 or Nycon 3, was held on 31 August–4 September 1967 at the Statler Hilton Hotel in New York City, New York.

The chairmen were Ted White and Dave Van Arnam.

== Participants ==
Attendance was approximately 1,500.

=== Guests of honor ===
- Lester del Rey (pro)
- Bob Tucker (fan)
- Harlan Ellison (toastmaster)

== Awards ==
The World Science Fiction Society administers and presents the Hugo Awards, the oldest and most noteworthy award for science fiction. Selection of the recipients is by vote of the Worldcon members. Categories include novels and short fiction, artwork, dramatic presentations, and various professional and fandom activities.

Other awards may be presented at Worldcon at the discretion of the individual convention committee. This has often included the national SF awards of the host country, such as the Japanese Seiun Awards as part of Nippon 2007, and the Prix Aurora Awards as part of Anticipation in 2009. The Astounding Award for Best New Writer and the Sidewise Award, though not sponsored by the Worldcon, are usually presented, as well as the Chesley Awards, the Prometheus Award, and others. In 2021, the Nommo Awards began presenting at Worldcon.

=== 1967 Hugo Awards ===
- Best Novel: The Moon Is a Harsh Mistress by Robert A. Heinlein
- Best Novelette: "The Last Castle" by Jack Vance
- Best Short Story: "Neutron Star" by Larry Niven
- Best Professional Artist: Jack Gaughan
- Best Dramatic Presentation: "The Menagerie" (Star Trek)
- Best Professional Magazine: if
- Best Fanzine: Niekas edited by Ed Meskys and Felice Rolfe
- Best Fan Artist: Jack Gaughan
- Best Fan Writer: Alexei Panshin

=== Other awards ===
- Special Award: CBS Television for 21st Century

== See also ==
- Hugo Award
- Science fiction
- Speculative fiction
- World Science Fiction Society
- Worldcon

Preceded by 24th World Science Fiction Convention; Tricon in Cleveland, Ohio, United States (1966)	List of Worldcons; 25th World Science Fiction Convention; NyCon 3 in New York City, United States (1967)	Succeeded by 26th World Science Fiction Convention; Baycon in Berkeley, California, United States (1968)
