= 8th World Science Fiction Convention =

1950 convention in Portland, Oregon, U.S.

NorWesCon, the 8th World Science Fiction Convention
- Genre: Science fiction
- Dates: 1–4 September 1950
- Venue: Multnomah Hotel
- Location: Portland, Oregon
- Country: United States
- Attendance: ~400

The 8th World Science Fiction Convention (Worldcon), also known as NorWesCon, was held on 1–4 September 1950 at the Multnomah Hotel in Portland, Oregon, United States. The supporting organization was the Portland Science-Fantasy Society.

The chairman was Donald B. Day.

== Participants ==
Attendance was approximately 400.

=== Guests of honor ===
- Anthony Boucher
- Theodore Sturgeon (toastmaster, listed as the "Entertainment Master of Ceremonies")

== Programming and events ==
An advance preview screening of George Pal's science fiction film Destination Moon was held at a nearby local theater for NorWesCon members.

== See also ==
- Culture of Portland, Oregon
- Hugo Award
- Science fiction
- Speculative fiction
- World Science Fiction Society
- Worldcon

Preceded by 7th World Science Fiction Convention; Cinvention in Cincinnati, Ohio, United States (1949)	List of Worldcons; 8th World Science Fiction Convention; NorWesCon in Portland, Oregon, United States (1950)	Succeeded by 9th World Science Fiction Convention; Nolacon in New Orleans, Louisiana, United States (1951)
