= Boobs (short story) =

Fantasy short story by Suzy McKee Charnas

"Boobs" is a fantasy short story by Suzy McKee Charnas. It was first published in Asimov's Science Fiction, in July 1989.

== Synopsis ==
Kelsey Bornstein's classmates bully her because she is the first person their age to grow large breasts. However, instead of menstruating, Kelsey becomes a werewolf.

== Reception ==
"Boobs" won the 1990 Hugo Award for Best Short Story and was a finalist for the Nebula Award for Best Short Story of 1989. Charnas noted that Kelsey is "pretty selfish and empathy blind".
