= Or All the Seas with Oysters =

- Short story by Avram Davidson
- Language: English
- Genre: Science fiction short story

Publication
- Published in: Galaxy Science Fiction
- Publication type: Periodical
- Publisher: Galaxy Publishing Corporation
- Publication date: May 1958
- Publication place: United States
- Media type: Print (Magazine)
- Pages: 10
- Award: Hugo Award for Best Short Story (1958)

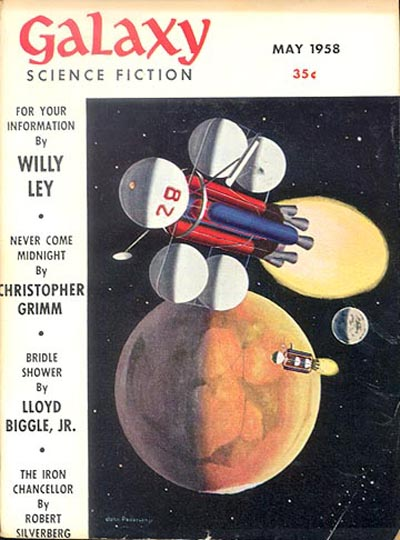
Cover of Galaxy magazine, May 1958

"Or All the Seas with Oysters" is a science fiction short story by American writer Avram Davidson. It first appeared in the May 1958 issue of Galaxy Science Fiction and won the Hugo Award for Best Short Story in 1958. One of Davidson's best-known stories, it has been anthologized or collected more than a dozen times.

== Plot summary ==
Struck by the fact that there are never enough pins yet always too many coat-hangers, a bicycle shop owner begins to speculate about the possible parallels between natural and man-made objects.
