= 10th World Science Fiction Convention =

10th Worldcon (1952)

Chicon II, the 10th World Science Fiction Convention
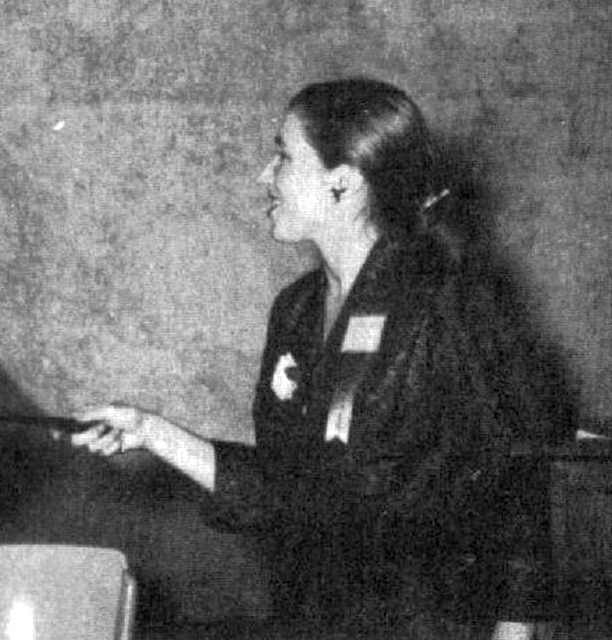
- Julian May chairing the 1952 World Science Fiction Convention
- Genre: Science fiction
- Dates: 30 August – 1 September 1952
- Venue: Morrison Hotel
- Locations: Chicago, Illinois
- Country: United States
- Attendance: 870
- Filing status: non-profit

The 10th World Science Fiction Convention, or the tenth instance of Worldcon, was held on the Labor Day weekend, 30 August – 1 September 1952, at the Morrison Hotel in Chicago, and was chaired by Julian May.

== Participants ==
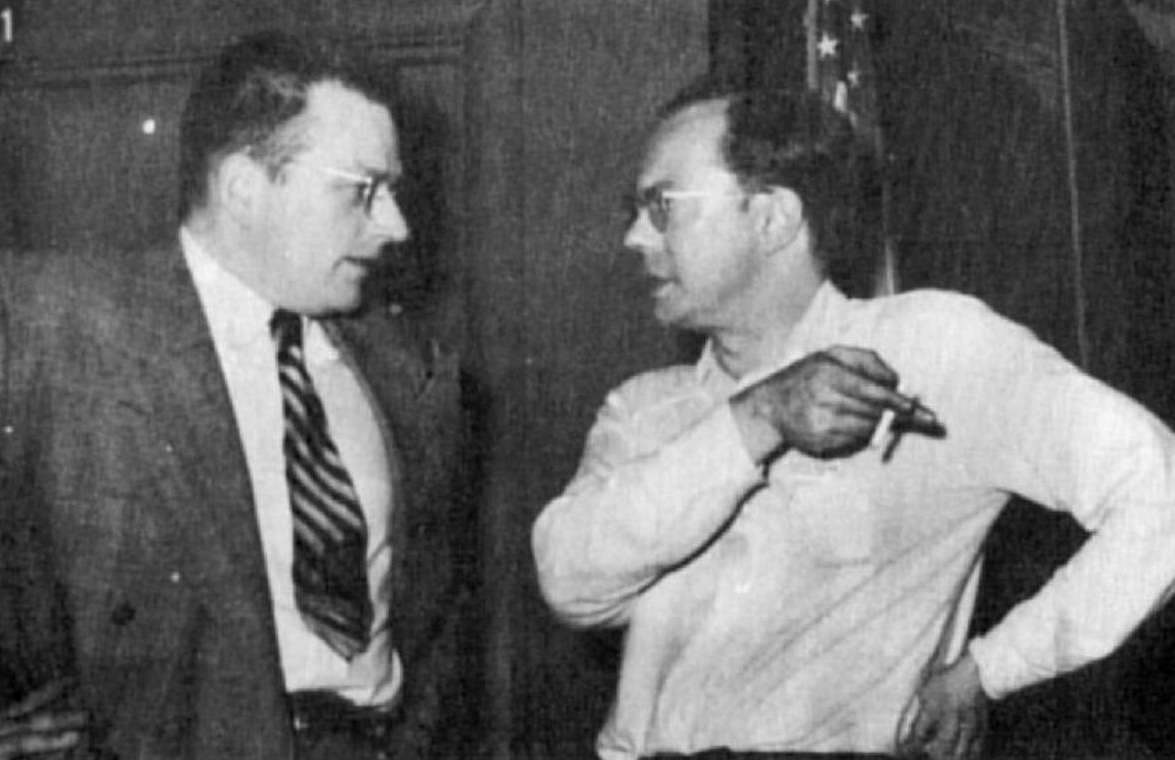
John W. Campbell and Anthony Boucher at the 1952 World Science Fiction Convention

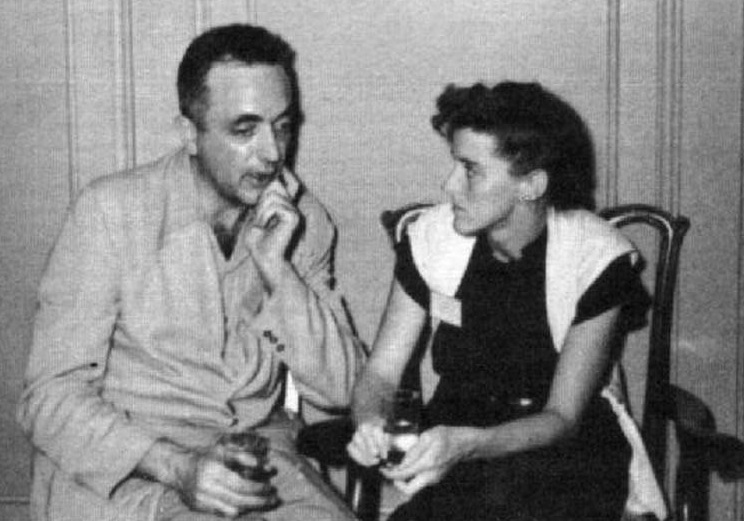
Katherine MacLean and Fritz Leiber at the 1952 World Science Fiction Convention

For years this Worldcon held the record for the largest attendance at any early science fiction convention, with 870 registered attendees, a figure which was not surpassed by another Worldcon until 1967 for NyCon 3 in New York City. By way of comparison, the previous year's Worldcon, the Nolacon in New Orleans, had an attendance of approximately 190.

=== Guests of honor ===
- Hugo Gernsback

== Programming and events ==
The program included the performance of an original science fiction ballet.

== Awards ==
It was at this Worldcon that the idea for the Hugo Awards was first proposed and adopted. These awards, the highest and oldest honor in science fiction, were first awarded at the next one, the 1953 Worldcon in Philadelphia.

== Notes ==
This Worldcon never chose an official name other than the title "10th World Science Fiction Convention", as both the convention's issued membership card and program book clearly stated. Only the first Worldcon in New York City (1939) and the 11th in Philadelphia (1953) shared this lack of a formal convention name. The phrases "Tenth Anniversary World Science Fiction Convention" (TAWSFiC) and "Tenth Anniversary Science Fiction Convention" (TASFiC, likely a simple linotype error, as "World" is missing) were each used in some of this Worldcon's pre-convention materials; the phrase's acronyms "TAWSFiC" and "TASFiC" were never officially used in print or otherwise by the Chicago committee at that time. However, the 10th Worldcon was frequently referred to by its members by the unofficial name Chicon II, so dubbed after the previous Chicago Worldcon (Chicon) in 1940; this name proved so popular that the convention became known as Chicon II in science fiction fandom's lore and written histories.

The convention is said to have been the place where Sturgeon's Law was first formulated (although other origin stories claim Sturgeon first articulated the concept in 1951, a year earlier). During a panel discussion on science fiction, one of the panelists observed that about 90% of science fiction was crud. Theodore Sturgeon, also on the panel, replied that 90% of everything was crud.

== In fiction ==
The previous convention, Nolacon, is a plot point in The Case of the Little Green Men, the first novel by Mack Reynolds, which is set in part at "AnnCon", a fictional version of the 10th World Science Fiction Convention held in 1952. The real 10th Worldcon, held in Chicago, had no actual name like "AnnCon", being simply called, in its own publications, "the 10th Annual World Science Fiction Convention" (and once as "the 10th Annual Science Fiction Convention," likely a dropped-word linotype operator's typo). Before and during the convention, its attendees often referred to it as "Chicon II," an unofficial nickname that stuck to this Chicago Worldcon in the decades that followed.

== See also ==
- Hugo Award
- Science fiction
- Speculative fiction
- World Science Fiction Society
- Worldcon

Preceded by 9th World Science Fiction Convention; Nolacon I in New Orleans, Louisiana, United States (1951)	List of Worldcons; 10th World Science Fiction Convention; Chicon II in Chicago, Illinois, United States (1952)	Succeeded by 11th World Science Fiction Convention; Philcon II in Philadelphia, Pennsylvania, United States (1953)
