= 65th World Science Fiction Convention =

65th Worldcon (2007)

Nippon 2007, the 65th World Science Fiction Convention
- Genre: Science fiction
- Dates: 30 August–3 September 2007
- Venue: Pacifico Yokohama Convention Center
- Location: Yokohama
- Country: Japan
- Attendance: 2,788
- Organizer: Japanese Association for Science Fiction International Communication
- Filing status: registered non-profit
- Website: nippon2007.us (English-language site)

The 65th World Science Fiction Convention (Worldcon), also known as Nippon 2007, was held on 30 August–3 September 2007 at the Pacifico Yokohama Convention Center and adjoining hotels in Yokohama, Japan.

The organising committee was chaired by Hiroaki Inoue.

This convention was also the 46th Annual Nihon SF Taikai.

This was the first Worldcon held in Asia.

== Participants ==
Attendance was 2,788, of whom 1,578 were from Japan.

=== Guests of honor ===
- Sakyo Komatsu (author)
- David Brin (author)
- Takumi Shibano (fan)
- Yoshitaka Amano (artist)
- Michael Whelan (artist)

== Awards ==
The World Science Fiction Society administers and presents the Hugo Awards, the oldest and most noteworthy award for science fiction. Selection of the recipients is by vote of the Worldcon members. Categories include novels and short fiction, artwork, dramatic presentations, and various professional and fandom activities.

Other awards may be presented at Worldcon at the discretion of the individual convention committee. This has often included the national SF awards of the host country, such as the Japanese Seiun Awards as part of Nippon 2007, and the Prix Aurora Awards as part of Anticipation in 2009. The Astounding Award for Best New Writer and the Sidewise Award, though not sponsored by the Worldcon, are usually presented, as well as the Chesley Awards, the Prometheus Award, and others. In 2021, the Nommo Awards began presenting at Worldcon.

=== 2007 Hugo Awards ===
The base of the 2007 Hugo Award included a silhouette of Mount Fuji as a backdrop and a statue of the Japanese superhero Ultraman standing just taller than the iconic Hugo Award rocket.

The Hugo Award nominations were announced on 28 March 2007. A correction was issued a few days later when award officials were notified that a computing error had resulted in the film Pan's Labyrinth being left off the nomination list for Best Dramatic Presentation, Long Form.

- Best Novel: "Rainbows End" by Vernor Vinge
- Best Novella: "A Billion Eves by Robert Reed
- Best Novelette: "The Djinn's Wife" by Ian McDonald
- Best Short Story: "Impossible Dreams" by Tim Pratt
- Best Related Book: James Tiptree Jr: The Double Life of Alice B. Sheldon by Julie Phillips
- Best Dramatic Presentation, Long Form: Pan's Labyrinth written and directed by Guillermo del Toro
- Best Dramatic Presentation, Short Form: Doctor Who: "The Girl in the Fireplace" written by Steven Moffat, directed by Euros Lyn
- Best Professional Editor, Long Form: Patrick Nielsen Hayden
- Best Professional Editor, Short Form: Gordon Van Gelder
- Best Professional Artist: Donato Giancola
- Best Semiprozine: Locus, edited by Charles N. Brown, Kirsten Gong-Wong & Liza Groen Trombi
- Best Fanzine: Science-Fiction Five-Yearly edited by Lee Hoffman, Geri Sullivan and Randy Byers
- Best Fan Writer: Dave Langford
- Best Fan Artist: Frank Wu

=== Other awards ===
- John W. Campbell Award for Best New Writer: Naomi Novik

== Future site selection ==
The members of Nippon 2007 selected Montréal, Québec as the hosting city for the 67th World Science Fiction Convention, to be held in 2009.

== See also ==
- Hugo Award
- Science fiction
- Speculative fiction
- World Science Fiction Society
- Worldcon

Preceded by 64th World Science Fiction Convention; L.A.con IV in Anaheim, California, United States (2006)	List of Worldcons; 65th World Science Fiction Convention; Nippon 2007 in Yokohama, Japan (2007)	Succeeded by 66th World Science Fiction Convention; Denvention 3 in Denver, Colorado, United States (2008)
