= Chesley Awards =

Annual award for science fiction and fantasy artwork

- Description: Premier awards for science fiction and fantasy art
- Country: United States
- Presented by: Association of Science Fiction and Fantasy Artists (ASFA)
- Website: http://www.asfa-art.org/chesley.html

Chesley Bonestell, the award's namesake, with painting of a two stage rocket

The Chesley Awards are the "pinnacle award" for art in the science fiction and fantasy genre. Established in 1985 by the Association of Science Fiction and Fantasy Artists, the awards recognize individual artistic works and achievements during a given year. The Chesleys were initially called the ASFA Awards, but were later renamed to honor famed astronomical artist Chesley Bonestell following his death in 1986. The awards are presented annually, typically at the World Science Fiction Convention (Worldcon).

== Chesley Award categories ==
- Chesley Award for Best Cover Illustration – Hardcover
- Chesley Award for Best Cover Illustration – Paperback/Ebook
- Chesley Award for Best Cover Illustration – Magazine
- Chesley Award for Best Interior Illustration
- Chesley Award for Best Three-Dimensional Art
- Chesley Award for Best Color Work – Unpublished
- Chesley Award for Best Monochrome Work – Unpublished
- Chesley Award for Best Product Illustration
- Chesley Award for Best Gaming-Related Illustration
- Chesley Award for Best Art Director
- Chesley Award for Lifetime Artistic Achievement
- Chesley Award for Contribution to ASFA (through 2006)
