= 1986 in science fiction =

The year 1986 was marked, in science fiction, by the following:

== Events ==
- Gardner Dozois begins his run as editor of Asimov's Science Fiction.
- The 44th annual Worldcon, ConFederation, is held in Atalanta, USA.
- The first Galaxy Awards, for Chinese science fiction, are awarded.

== Births and deaths ==
=== Deaths ===
- Judy Lynn Del Rey
- Gardner Fox
- Frank Herbert
- L. Ron Hubbard

== Literary releases ==
=== Novels ===
- Speaker for the Dead, by Orson Scott Card

=== Children's books ===
- Many Waters, by Madeleine L'Engle

=== Comics ===
- Watchmen, by Alan Moore and Dave Gibbons

== Movies ==
- Aliens dir. by James Cameron
- The Fly, dir. by David Cronenberg
- Little Shop of Horrors, dir. by Frank Oz

== Television ==
- ALF, created by Tom Patchett and Paul Fusco

== Video games ==
- Metroid

== Other Media ==
- The pinball game Pin-Bot, developed by Python Anghelo and Barry Oursler; published by Williams

== Awards ==
=== Hugos ===
- Best novel: Ender's Game, by Orson Scott Card
- Best novella: 24 Views of Mt. Fuji, by Hokusai, by Roger Zelazny
- Best novelette: "Paladin of the Lost Hour" by Harlan Ellison
- Best short story: "Fermi and Frost" by Frederick Pohl
- Best related work: Science Made Stupid by Tom Weller
- Best dramatic presentation: Back to the Future, dir. by Robert Zemeckis, written by Robert Zemeckis and Bob Gale
- Best professional editor: Judy Lynn Del Rey (awarded posthumously and declined on her behalf by her husband Lester Del Rey)
- Best professional artist: Michael Whelan
- Best Semiprozine: Locus, ed. by Charles N. Brown
- Best fanzine: Lan's Lantern, ed. by George "Lan" Laskowski
- Best fan writer: Mike Glyer
- Best fan artist: Joan Hanke-Woods

=== Nebulas ===
- Best novel: Speaker for the Dead, by Orson Scott Card
- Best novella: R&R, by Lucius Shepard
- Best novelette: "The Girl Who Fell into the Sky" by Kate Wilhelm
- Best short story: "Tangents" by Greg Bear

=== Other awards ===
- BSFA Award for Best Novel: The Ragged Astronauts, by Bob Shaw
- Locus Award for Best Science Fiction Novel: The Postman, by David Brin
- Saturn Award for Best Science Fiction Film: Aliens
