= 44th World Science Fiction Convention =

44th Worldcon (1986)

ConFederation, the 44th World Science Fiction Convention
- Genre: Science fiction
- Dates: 28 August–1 September 1986
- Venue: Marriott Marquis and Atlanta Hilton
- Location: Atlanta, Georgia
- Country: United States
- Attendance: 5,811
- Filing status: 501(c)(3) non-profit

The 44th World Science Fiction Convention (Worldcon), also known as ConFederation, was held on 28 August–1 September 1986 at the Marriott Marquis and Atlanta Hilton in Atlanta, Georgia, United States.

The convention was co-chaired by Penny Frierson and Ron Zukowski.

== Participants ==
Attendance was 5,811.

=== Guests of honor ===
- Ray Bradbury (pro)
- Terry Carr (fan)
- Bob Shaw (toastmaster)

== Awards ==
The World Science Fiction Society administers and presents the Hugo Awards, the oldest and most noteworthy award for science fiction. Selection of the recipients is by vote of the Worldcon members. Categories include novels and short fiction, artwork, dramatic presentations, and various professional and fandom activities.

Other awards may be presented at Worldcon at the discretion of the individual convention committee. This has often included the national SF awards of the host country, such as the Japanese Seiun Awards as part of Nippon 2007, and the Prix Aurora Awards as part of Anticipation in 2009. The Astounding Award for Best New Writer and the Sidewise Award, though not sponsored by the Worldcon, are usually presented, as well as the Chesley Awards, the Prometheus Award, and others. In 2021, the Nommo Awards began presenting at Worldcon.

=== 1986 Hugo Awards ===
- Best Novel: Ender's Game by Orson Scott Card
- Best Novella: "24 Views of Mt. Fuji, by Hokusai" by Roger Zelazny
- Best Novelette: "Paladin of the Lost Hour" by Harlan Ellison
- Best Short Story: "Fermi and Frost" by Frederik Pohl
- Best Non-Fiction Book: Science Made Stupid by Tom Weller
- Best Dramatic Presentation: Back to the Future
- Best Professional Editor: (award declined by Lester del Rey in the name of the recently deceased Judy-Lynn del Rey)
- Best Professional Artist: Michael Whelan
- Best Semiprozine: Locus, edited by Charles N. Brown
- Best Fanzine: Lan's Lantern, edited by George Laskowski
- Best Fan Writer: Mike Glyer
- Best Fan Artist: Joan Hanke-Woods

=== Other awards ===
- John W. Campbell Award for Best New Writer: Melissa Scott

== See also ==
- Hugo Award
- Science fiction
- Speculative fiction
- World Science Fiction Society
- Worldcon

Preceded by 43rd World Science Fiction Convention; Aussiecon Two in Melbourne, Australia (1985)	List of Worldcons; 44th World Science Fiction Convention; ConFederation in Atlanta, Georgia, USA (1986)	Succeeded by 45th World Science Fiction Convention; Conspiracy '87 in Brighton, UK (1987)
