= Culture Made Stupid =

1987 book by Tom Weller

- 1st US version
- Author: Tom Weller
- Cover artist: Tom Weller
- Language: English
- Genre: Satire
- Publisher: Houghton Mifflin Company
- Publication date: 1987
- Publication place: United States

Culture Made Stupid (also spelled Cvltvre Made Stvpid, ISBN 978-0395404614) is a book written and illustrated by Tom Weller in 1987.

The book is subtitled "A Misguided Tour of Illiterature, Fine & Dandy Arts, & the Subhumanities", and it satirizes literature and the humanities. The book in its entirety is available online, in addition to several excerpts, including an authorized reprinting of Beowulf ond Godsylla .

Paul Krugman, a columnist for The New York Times, called the book a "neglected classic".

Weller wrote a similar volume Science Made Stupid, satirizing science, which won the 1986 Hugo Award for Best Non-Fiction Book.
