= Tiger in the Snow =

Painting by Hokusai

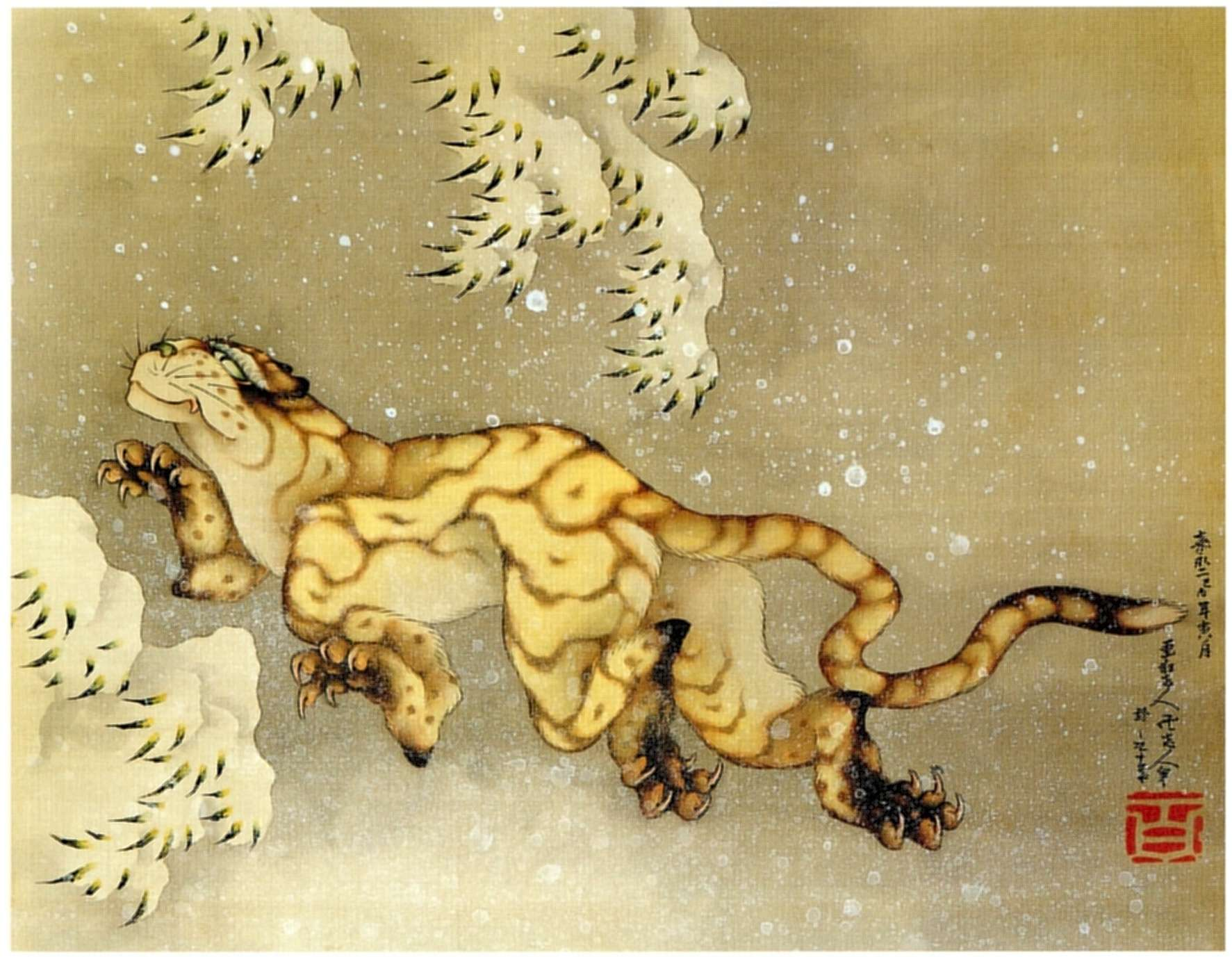
- Artist: Katsushika Hokusai
- Year: 1849
- Type: Hanging scroll, ink and paint on silk
- Dimensions: 39 cm × 50 cm (15.375 in × 19.625 in)
- Location: Private collection

Tiger in the Snow is a hanging scroll (kakemono) painted by Japanese ukiyo-e artist Hokusai in 1849. It is one of the last works he produced in his long and prolific career.

== History and description ==
Towards the end of his life, Hokusai began to draw many large cats. Between 1842 and 1843 Hokusai painted a shishi lion every day as a talisman against bad luck in a practice he called nisshin joma, or "daily exorcisms". In his final years, tigers became a subject matter to which he returned several times.

In the painting the ground is invisible and the tiger seems to float through the snow-filled air. The snow-covered bamboo fronds echo the claws of the tiger. His fur is rendered with wavy lines, a sinuous effect more in keeping with a snake or dragon. The tiger's expression has been variously described as a smile or a snarl, the tiger himself appears joyful, amused, and "royally pleased with himself".

The signed inscription reads: "Month of the Tiger, Year of the Cock, old Manji, the old man mad about painting, at the age of ninety". The work, possibly his last painting, was done just a few months before his death aged eighty-nine by Western reckoning. It shows that even in his old age, Hokusai's powers remained undiminished. Narazaki Muneshige wrote of this painting, "While the artist's body was emaciated and bones wearied by age, in his thoughts he was a charging tiger". The seal reading Hyaku, or "One Hundred", is another sign of Hokusai's preoccupation with longevity.

== Art market ==
The painting was sold by Christie's auction house for US$772,500 in October 1998. It is held by a private American collector.

== Sources ==
- Machotka, Ewa (2009). Visual Genesis of Japanese National Identity: Hokusai's Hyakunin Isshu. Peter Lang. ISBN 9789052014821.
- Calza, Gian Carlo (2003). Hokusai. Phaidon. ISBN 0714844578.
