= Oceans of Wisdom =

Series of woodblock prints by Katsushika Hokusai

"Whaling Off Gotō" from Oceans of Wisdom
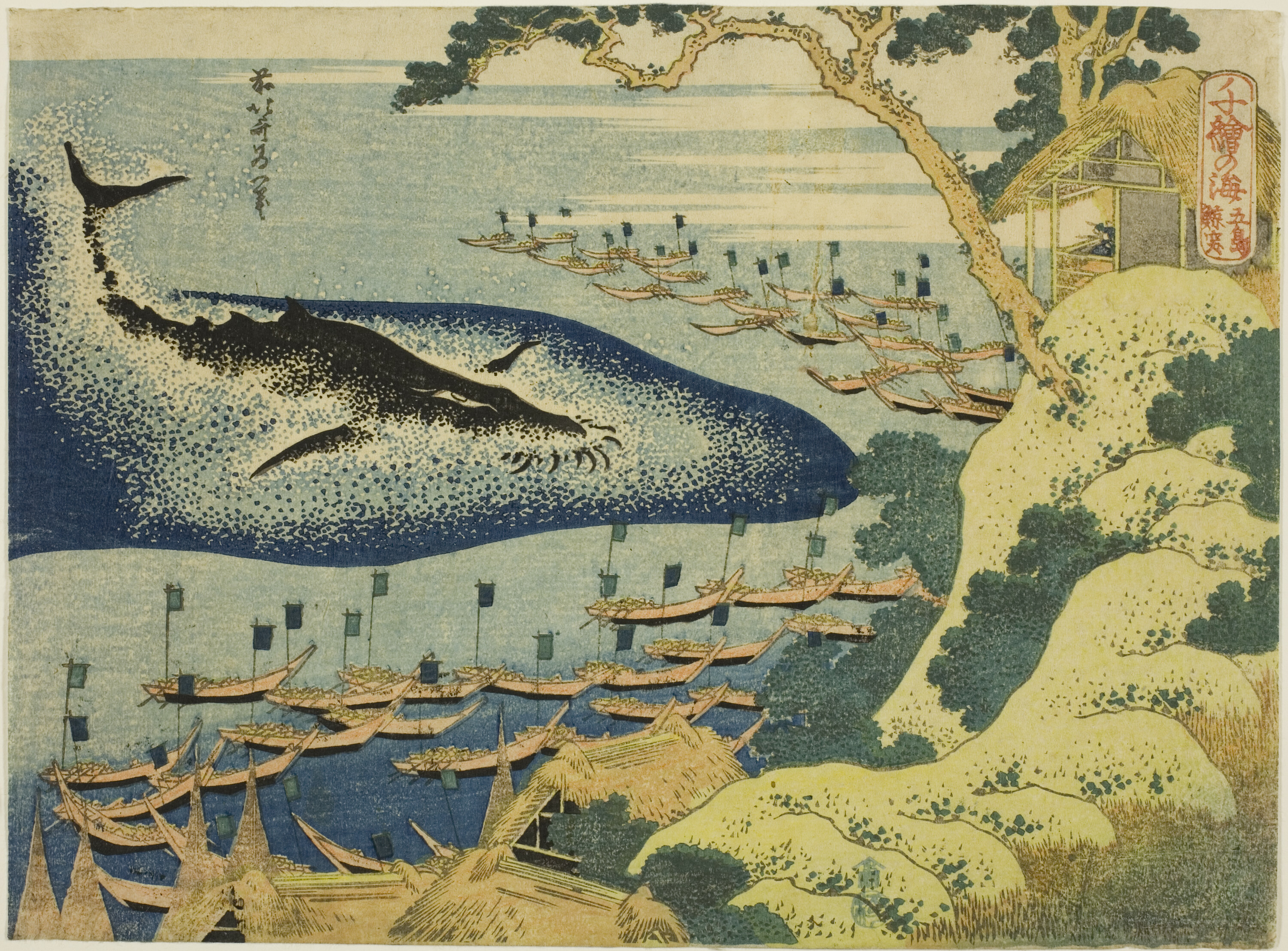
- Artist: Hokusai
- Year: Published c. 1832–1834
- Type: Wood block prints
- Dimensions: 19 cm × 25.4 cm (7.5 in × 10.0 in)

Oceans of Wisdom (Japanese: Chie no umi (千絵の海)) is a chūban yoko-e (19 × 25.4 cm) sized woodblock print series by the Japanese artist Hokusai. The ten fishing-themed prints comprise one of Hokusai's rarest sets. Published by Moriya Jihei, it seems to have been issued around 1832–1834 and publication of the prints ceased abruptly. Some preparatory drawings are extant for prints that were never made.

The prints, which feature scenes of fishing including shellfish-gathering, whaling and fly-fishing, allow Hokusai to explore one of his favourite themes, that of man expressing himself through labour and harmoniously working with the forces of nature. This is particularly evident in the print Chōshi in Shimōsa Province, which shows fishing boats struggling in a stormy sea, echoing his roughly contemporaneous The Great Wave off Kanagawa.

The series' use of colour differs from other landscape prints of the time. It has richly overprinted shades and an unusual palette of yellow, green and varying red pigments. Hokusai also employs the rare technique of using black for colour and not just line, suggestive of the influence of Western oil painting.

== Title ==
The title of the series can be read in two ways. The characters 千絵の海 read as "One Thousand Pictures of the Ocean" (or "One Thousand Pictures of the Sea"), but when read aloud the title sounds like "Oceans of Wisdom".

== Prints ==
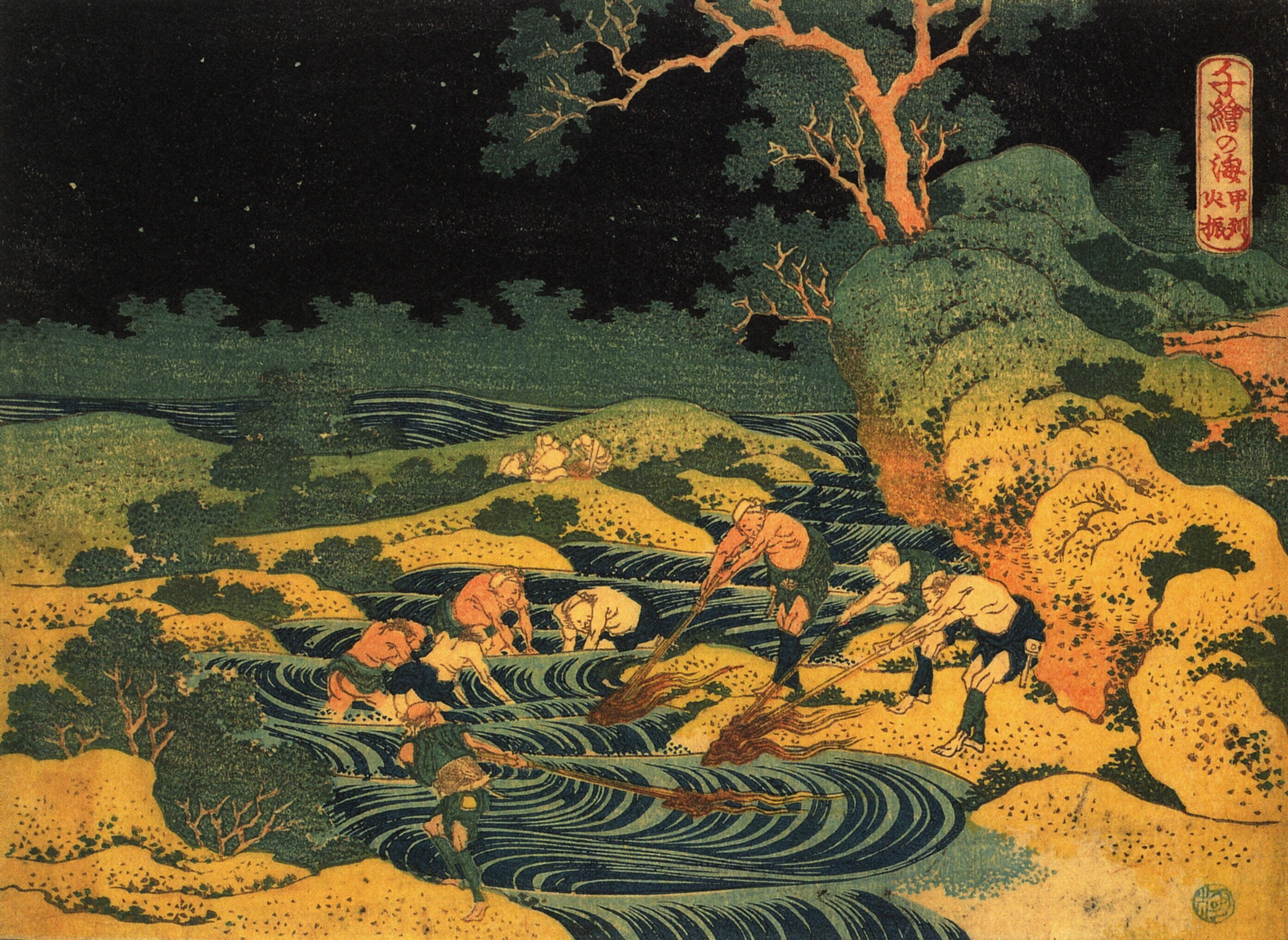
Fishing by Torchlight in Kai Province (甲州火振 Kōshū hiburi)

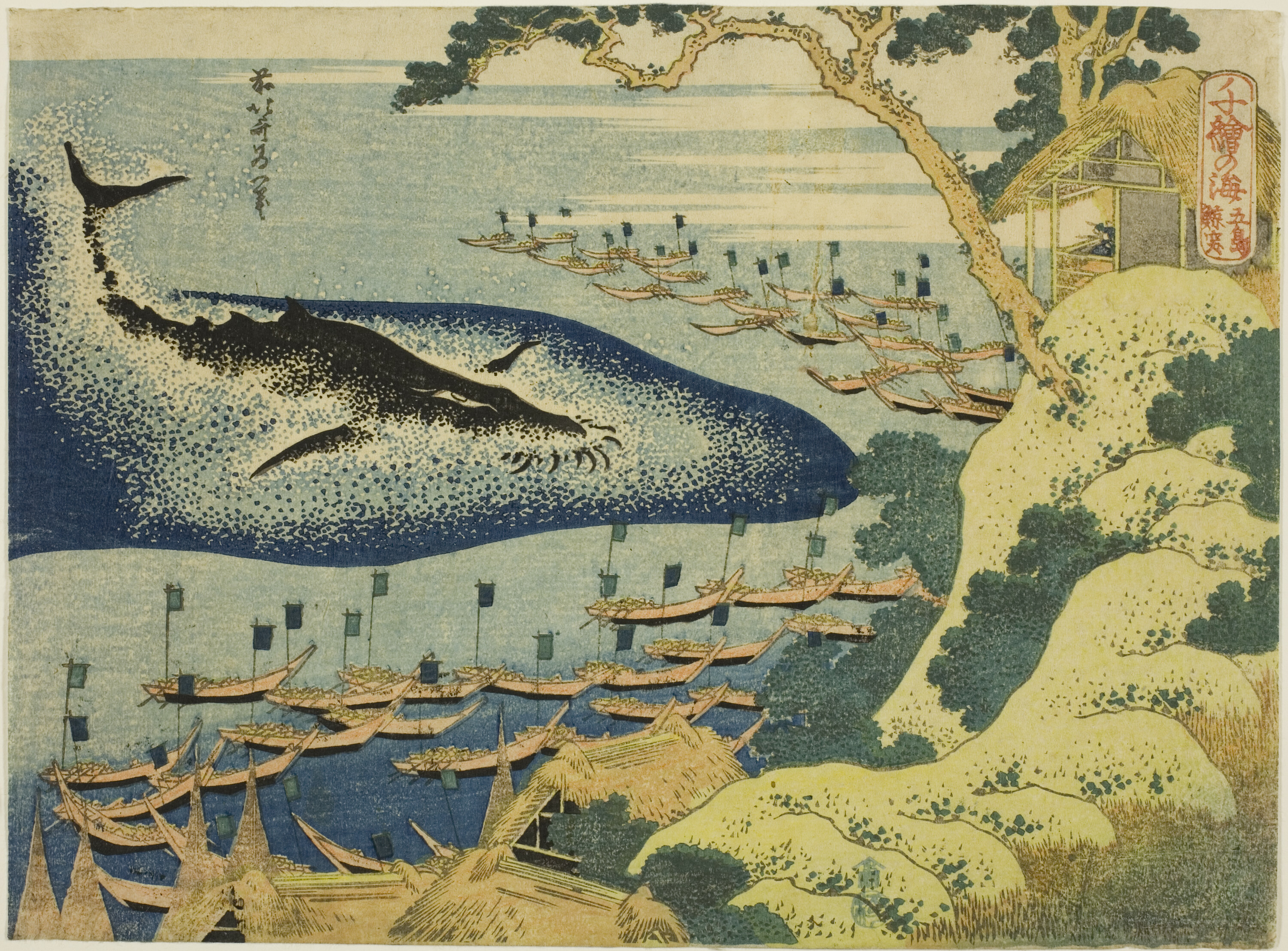
Whaling off Gotō (五島鯨突 Gotō kujira tsugi)

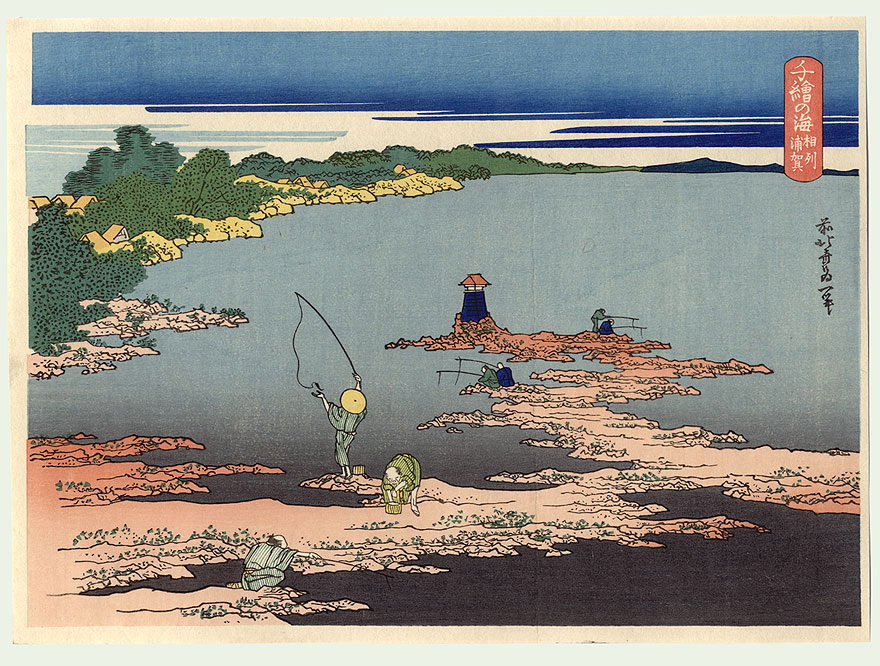
Fishing at Uraga in Sagami Province (相州浦賀 Sōshū Uraga)

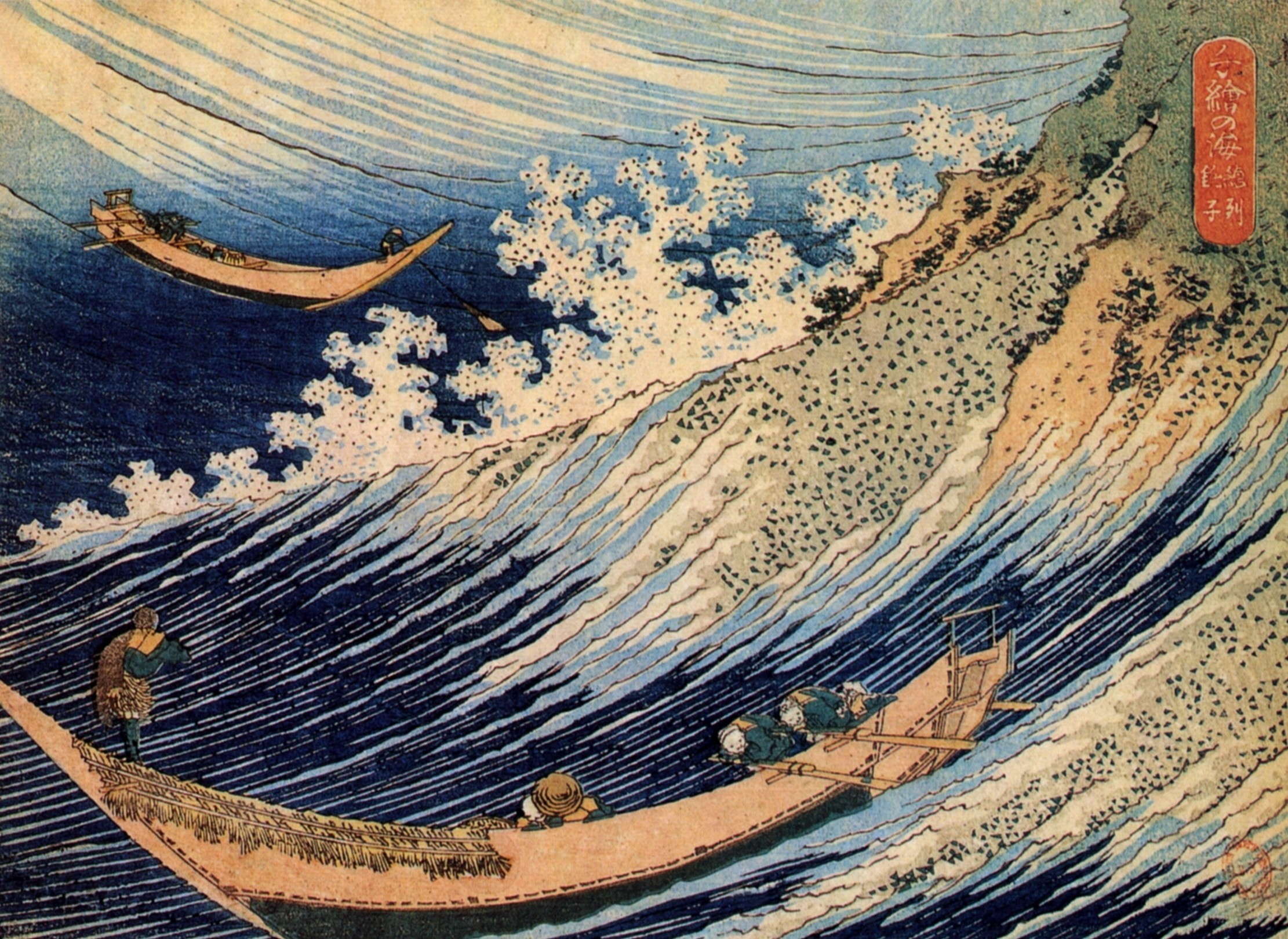
Chōshi in Shimōsa Province (総州銚子 Sōshū Chōshi)

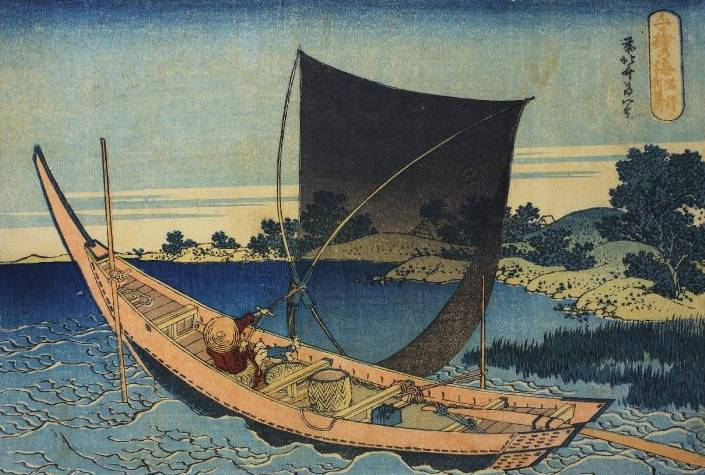
The Tonegawa River in Shimōsa Province (総州利根川 Sōshū Tonegawa)

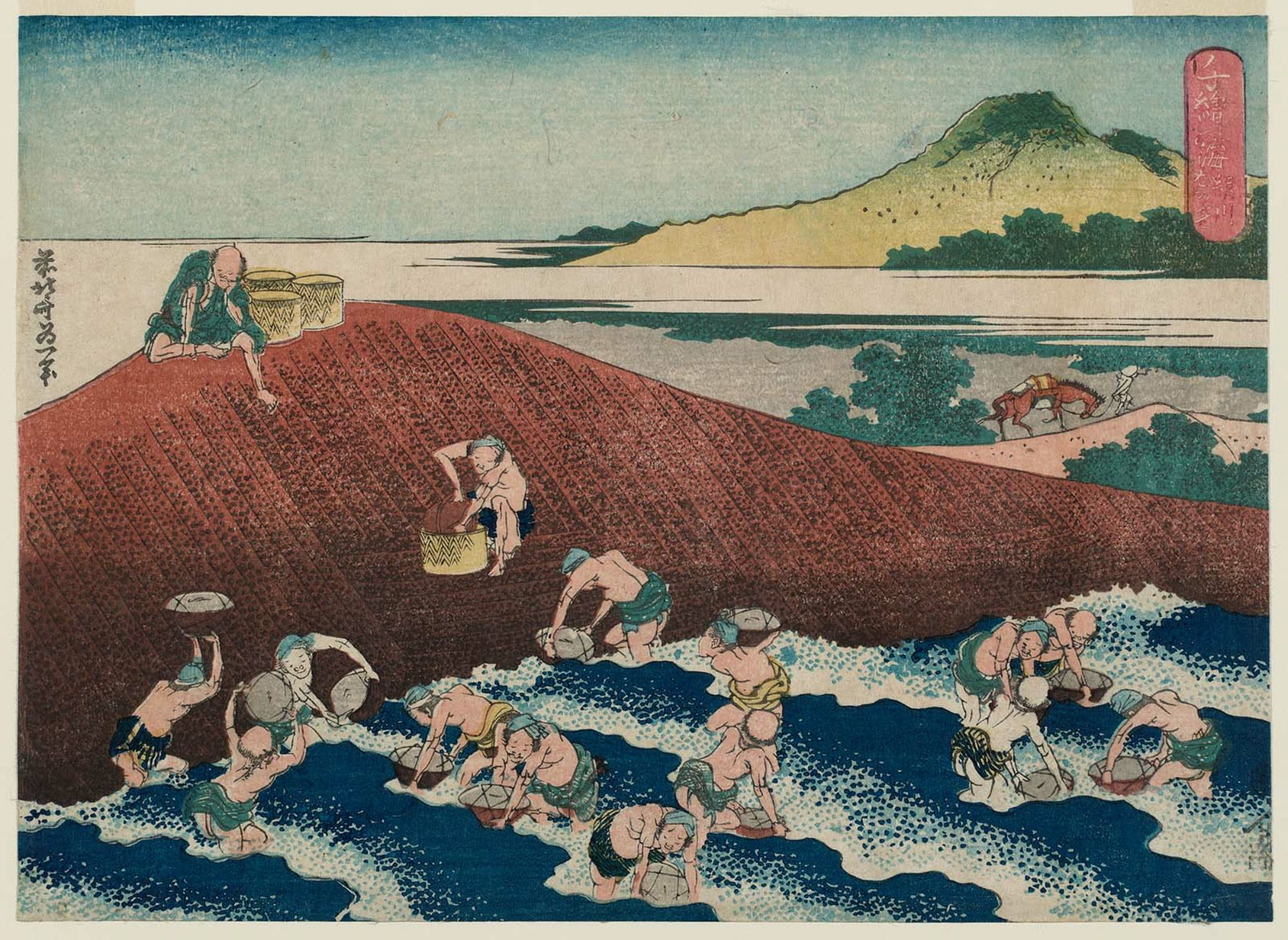
Basket-fishing in the Kinu River (絹川はちふせ Kinugawa hachifuse)

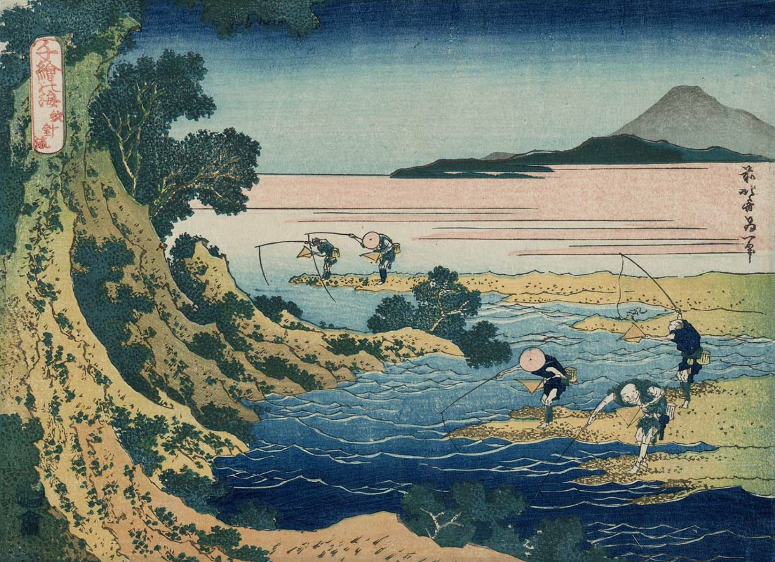
Fly-fishing (蚊針流 Kabari-nagashi)

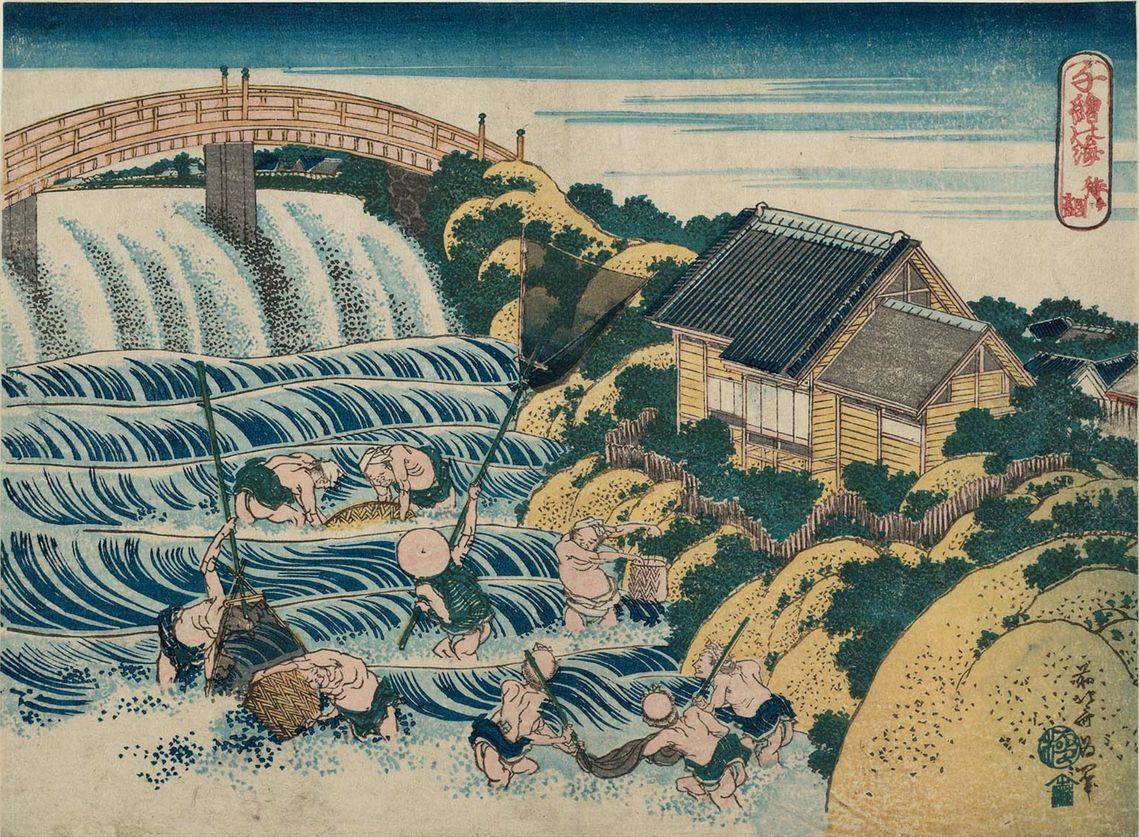
Waiting Nets (待チ網 Machi-ami)

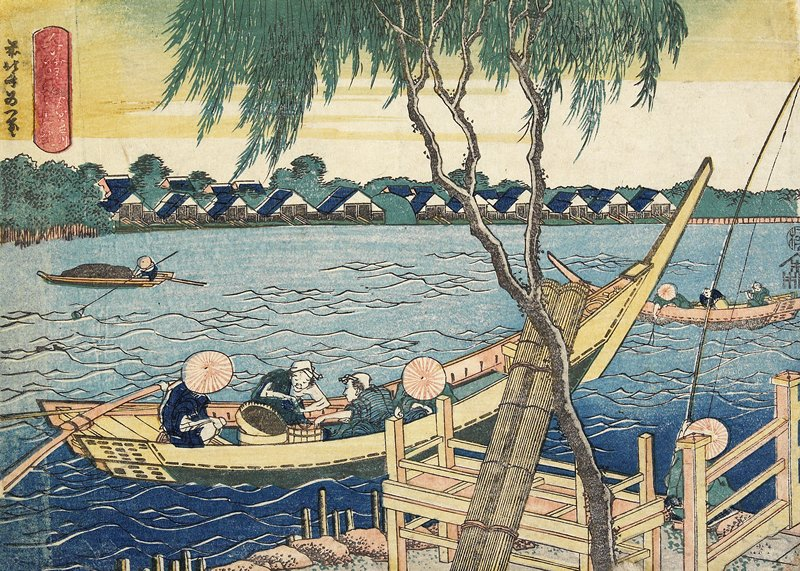
Fishing in the Miyato River (宮戸川長縄 Miyatogawa nagawa)

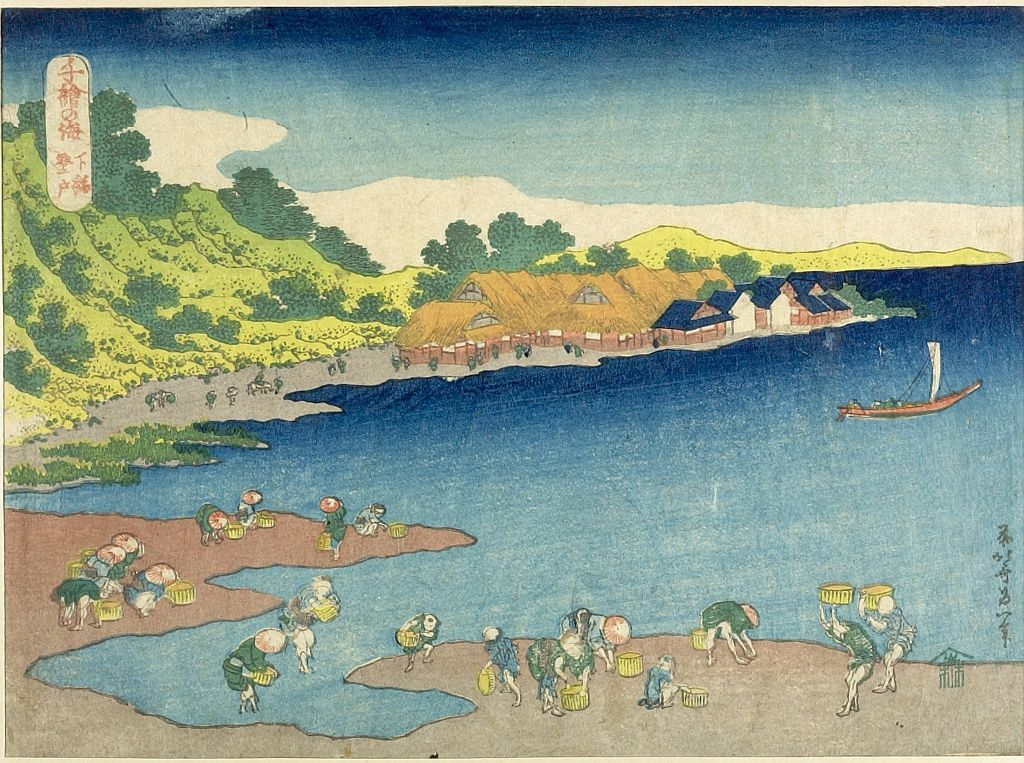
Noboto in Shimōsa Province (下総登戸 Shimōsa Noboto)
