= 24 Views of Mt. Fuji, by Hokusai =

Science fiction novella by Roger Zelazny

- Short story by Roger Zelazny
- Genre: Science fiction

Publication
- Published in: Isaac Asimov's Science Fiction Magazine
- Publication date: July 1985

24 Views of Mt. Fuji, by Hokusai is a science fiction novella by American writer Roger Zelazny, originally published in the July 1985 issue of the Isaac Asimov's Science Fiction Magazine. It won the Hugo Award for Best Novella in 1986 and was also nominated for the Nebula Award for Best Novella in 1985.

The novella was partly inspired by Hokusai's Views of Mt. Fuji (Charles Tuttle, 1965), a book that contains precisely 24 prints painted by Hokusai. In Zelazny's version, the character Mari consults that very book during the story. (Hokusai painted more than 100 images of Mount Fuji but he is best known for another selection of them: Thirty-six Views of Mount Fuji.)

== Plot summary ==
A widow makes a pilgrimage in Japan to some of the locations of Hokusai's views of Mount Fuji, ultimately attempting to confront her former husband who had become a nearly all-powerful digital being.
