= Science Made Stupid =

Book by Tom Weller

Science Made Stupid: How to Discomprehend the World Around Us
- Author: Tom Weller
- Illustrator: Tom Weller
- Language: English
- Published: 1985
- ISBN: 978-0395366462
- LC Class: Q162 .W45 1985

Science Made Stupid: How to Discomprehend the World Around Us is a 1985 book written and illustrated by Tom Weller. The winner of the 1986 Hugo Award for Best Non-Fiction Book, it is a parody of a junior high or high school-level science textbook. Though now out of print, high-resolution scans are available online, as well as an abridged transcription, both of which have been endorsed by Weller. Highlights of the book include a satirical account of the creationism vs. evolution debate and Weller's drawings of fictional prehistoric animals (e.g., the duck-billed mastodon). The style has been compared to Mad magazine.

Weller released a companion volume, Culture Made Stupid (also spelled Cvltvre Made Stvpid), which satirizes literature and the humanities.
