= Fermi and Frost =

- Short story by Frederik Pohl
- Genre: Science Fiction

Publication
- Publication date: 1985

"Fermi and Frost" is a science fiction short story by American writer Frederik Pohl, first published in the January 1985 issue of Isaac Asimov's Science Fiction Magazine. It won the Hugo Award for Best Short Story in 1986.

== Summary ==
The story opens with an astronomer who is at an airport when a nuclear war begins. Recognized by a fan, he is offered a seat on a plane escaping to Iceland. Though Reykjavík is destroyed by a thermonuclear warhead, the rest of the island is unharmed. The survivors take advantage of Iceland's geology and experience with cold weather to prepare for the nuclear winter that follows. Interwoven into the story is speculation about the Fermi paradox and the perspective on the possibility of alien life given the prospects of nuclear war.

== Sources, references, external links, quotations ==
- Fermi and Frost title listing at the Internet Speculative Fiction Database
