= 2025 in science fiction =

The year 2025 was marked, in science fiction, by the following:

== Events ==
- The 83rd annual Worldcon, Seattle Worldcon 2025, was held in Seattle, USA

== Births and deaths ==
=== Deaths ===
- George Barr
- Damien Broderick
- Barry B. Longyear
- David Lynch
- Chris Moore

== Literary releases ==
=== Novels ===
- These Memories Do Not Belong To Us, by Yiming Ma
- Death of the Author, by Nnedi Okorafor
- When the Moon Hits Your Eye, by John Scalzi

== Movies ==
- 28 Years Later, dir. by Danny Boyle
- Bugonia, dir. by Yorgos Lanthimos
- Elio, dir. by Madeline Sharafian, Domee Shi, and Adrian Molina
- Mickey 17, dir. by Bong Joon Ho
- Tron: Ares, dir. by Joachim Rønning

== Television ==
- Alien: Earth
- Murderbot
- Pluribus

== Video games ==
- Old Skies
- Split Fiction

== Awards ==
=== Hugos ===
- Best novel: The Tainted Cup, by Robert Jackson Bennett
- Best novella: The Tusks of Extinction, by Ray Nayler
- Best novelette: "The Four Sisters Overlooking the Sea", by Naomi Kritzer
- Best short story: "Stitched to Skin like Family Is", by Nghi Vo
- Best Series: Between Earth and Sky, by Rebecca Roanhorse
- Best Graphic Story or Comic: Star Trek: Lower Decks: Warp Your Own Way, by Ryan North and Chris Fenoglio
- Best related work: Speculative Whiteness: Science Fiction and the Alt-Right, by Jordan S. Carroll
- Best dramatic presentation, long form: Dune: Part 2, screenplay by Denis Villeneuve and Jon Spaihts, dir. by Denis Villeneuve
- Best dramatic presentation, short form: Star Trek: Lower Decks — "The New Next Generation", screenplay by Mike McMahan; based on Star Trek created by Gene Roddenberry; dir. by Megan Lloyd
- Best game or interactive work: Caves of Qud, by Bryan Bucklew and Jason Grinblat
- Best Professional Editor, short form: Neil Clarke
- Best professional editor, long form: Diana M. Pho
- Best professional artist: Alyssa Winans
- Best Semiprozine: Uncanny Magazine, ed. by Lynne M. Thomas and Michael Damian Thomas
- Best fanzine: Black Nerd Problems, ed. by William Evans and Omar Holmon
- Best Fancast: Eight Days of Diana Wynne Jones, by Emily Tesh and Rebecca Fraimow
- Best fan writer: Abigail Nussbaum
- Best fan artist: Sara Felix

=== Nebulas ===
- Best novel: The Buffalo Hunter Hunter, by Stephen Graham Jones
- Best novella: The River Has Roots, by Amal El-Mohtar
- Best novelette: "Uncertain Sons", by Thomas Ha
- Best short story: "Laser Eyes Ain't Everything", by Effie Seiberg
- Ray Bradbury Award: Murderbot Season One, by Chris Weitz and Paul Weitz
- Andre Norton Award: Into the Wild Magic, by Michelle Knudsen
- Best game writing: Clair Obscur: Expedition 33, by Guillaume Broche and Jennifer Svedberg-Yen
- Best Comic: Mary Shelley's School for Monsters: The Killing Stone, by Jessica Maison
- Best Poem: "The World to Come", by Jennifer Hudak

=== Other awards ===
- BSFA Award for Best Novel: When There are Wolves Again, by E. J. Swift
- Locus Award for Best Science Fiction Novel: The Man Who Saw Seconds, by Alexander Boldizar
- Saturn Award for Best Science Fiction Film: Avatar: Fire and Ash
