= 83rd World Science Fiction Convention =

83rd Worldcon (2025)

Seattle Worldcon 2025, the 83rd World Science Fiction Convention
- Genre: Science fiction
- Dates: August 13–17, 2025
- Venue: Seattle Convention Center (Summit building)
- Location: Seattle, Washington
- Country: United States
- Previous event: Glasgow 2024
- Next event: LAcon V
- Organizer: Seattle Genre Alliance
- Filing status: 501(c)(3)
- Website: seattlein2025.org

The 83rd World Science Fiction Convention (Worldcon), also known as Seattle Worldcon 2025, was held in August 13–17, 2025 in Seattle, Washington, United States. The science fiction convention was chaired by Kathy Bond.

== Participants ==
=== Guests of honor ===
- Martha Wells
- Donato Giancola
- Bridget Landry
- Alexander James Adams

== Awards ==
The World Science Fiction Society administers and presents the Hugo Awards, the oldest and most noteworthy award for science fiction. Selection of the recipients is by vote of the Worldcon members. Categories include novels and short fiction, artwork, dramatic presentations, and various professional and fandom activities.

Other awards may be presented at Worldcon at the discretion of the individual convention committee. This has often included the national SF awards of the host country, such as the Japanese Seiun Awards as part of Nippon 2007, and the Prix Aurora Awards as part of Anticipation in 2009. The Astounding Award for Best New Writer and the Sidewise Award, though not sponsored by the Worldcon, are usually presented, as well as the Chesley Awards, the Prometheus Award, and others. In 2021, the Nommo Awards began presenting at Worldcon.

The awards were announced at the convention.

- Best Novel: The Tainted Cup by Robert Jackson Bennett
- Best Novella: "The Tusks of Extinction" by Ray Nayler
- Best Novellette: "The Four Sisters Overlooking the Sea" by Naomi Kritzer
- Best Short Story: "Stitched to Skin Like Family Is" by Nghi Voi
- Best Series: Between Earth and Sky by Rebecca Roanhorse
- Best Graphic Story or Comic: Lower Decks: Warp Your Own Way by Ryan North and Chris Fenoglio
- Best Related Work: Speculative Whiteness: Science Fiction and the Alt-Right by Jordan S. Caroll
- Best Dramatic Presentation, Long Form: Dune: Part Two, screenplay by Denis Villeneuve and Jon Spaihts, directed by Denis Villeneuve
- Best Dramatic Presentation, Short Form: Star Trek: Lower Decks: "The New Next Generation", created and written by Mike McMahan, directed by Megan Lloyd
- Best Game or Interactive Work: Caves of Qud, produced by Freehold Games
- Best Editor Short Form: Neil Clarke
- Best Editor Long Form: Diana M. Pho
- Best Professional Artist: Alyssa Winans
- Best Semiprozine: Uncanny Magazine
- Best Fanzine: Black Nerd Problems
- Best Fancast: Eight Days of Diana Wynne Jones
- Best Fan Writer: Abigail Nussbaum
- Best Fan Artist: Sara Felix
- Best Poem: "A War of Words", by Marie Brennan
- Lodestar Award for Best Young Adult Book: Sheine Lende by Darcie Little Badger
- Astounding Award for Best New Writer: Moniquill Blackgoose

== Site selection ==
The site of the convention was chosen by members of the 81st World Science Fiction Convention. The bid for Seattle was the only bid on the site selection ballot. Seattle received 163 of the 168 valid ballots received.

== Controversies ==
=== AI controversy ===
On April 30, 2025, Worldcon Chair Kathy Bond posted a statement in response to questions regarding the con's use of AI, specifically ChatGPT, in their vetting process for program participants. This use of ChatGPT drew criticism from both the Sci-Fi and wider book communities, including authors. The most commonly expressed concern was that ChatGPT and similar large language models (LLMs) have been trained on copyrighted works without the authors' knowledge or consent. ChatGPT and other LLMs have also been shown to contain inherent biases and create fabrications it presents as facts.

In a subsequent statement on May 6, 2025, Chair Kathy Bond elaborated on Worldcon's AI use, apologized, and shared that they are "redoing the part of our program process that used ChatGPT".

== See also ==
- Speculative fiction
- World Science Fiction Society

| Preceded by 82nd World Science Fiction Convention; Glasgow 2024 in Glasgow, UK (2024) | List of Worldcons; 83rd World Science Fiction Convention; Seattle Worldcon 2025 in Seattle, Washington, United States (2025) | Succeeded by 84th World Science Fiction Convention; LAcon V in Anaheim, California, United States (2026) |
