= 82nd World Science Fiction Convention =

82nd Worldcon (2024)

Glasgow 2024, the 82nd World Science Fiction Convention
- Glasgow 2024 logo
- Genre: Science fiction
- Dates: 8–12 August 2024
- Venue: SEC Centre
- Location: Glasgow, Scotland
- Country: United Kingdom
- Previous event: Chengdu 2023
- Next event: Seattle 2025
- Organizer: Esther MacCallum-Stewart (Chair)
- Website: glasgow2024.org

The 82nd World Science Fiction Convention (Worldcon), also known as Glasgow 2024, was held in 2024 in Glasgow, Scotland, United Kingdom. The convention was chaired by Professor Esther MacCallum-Stewart.

== Participants ==
=== Guests of Honour ===
- Chris Baker (Fangorn)
- Claire Brialey
- Mark Plummer
- Ken MacLeod
- Nnedi Okorafor
- Terri Windling

=== Special Guests ===
- Samantha Béart
- Meganne Christian
- Tanya DePass
- Catherine Heymans
- Tendai Huchu
- Three Black Halflings

== Awards ==
The World Science Fiction Society administers and presents the Hugo Awards, the oldest and most noteworthy award for science fiction. Selection of the recipients is by vote of the Worldcon members. Categories include novels and short fiction, artwork, dramatic presentations, and various professional and fandom activities.

Other awards may be presented at Worldcon at the discretion of the individual convention committee. This has often included the national SF awards of the host country, such as the Japanese Seiun Awards as part of Nippon 2007, and the Prix Aurora Awards as part of Anticipation in 2009. The Astounding Award for Best New Writer and the Sidewise Award, though not sponsored by the Worldcon, are usually presented, as well as the Chesley Awards, the Prometheus Award, and others. In 2021, the Nommo Awards began presenting at Worldcon.

As a result of the 2023 ballot controversy, Glasgow 2024 Chairperson Professor Esther MacCallum-Stewart announced in February 2024 an updated process to ensure transparency in the awards selection: the reasons for any disqualifications of potential finalists will be published no later than April 2024; the full voting results, nominating statistics and voting statistics will be published immediately following the awards ceremony on 11 August 2024; and immediately following the awards ceremony on 11 August 2024, the Hugo administration subcommittee will publish a log explaining any decisions that they have made in interpreting the WSFS Constitution.

On 23 July 2024, the awards subcommittee for Glasgow 2024 announced that 377 of the total 3,813 Hugo Award votes had been disqualified for being fraudulent.

The awards were announced at the convention.

- Best Novel: Some Desperate Glory by Emily Tesh
- Best Novella: "Thornhedge" by T. Kingfisher
- Best Novellette: "The Year Without Sunshine" by Naomi Kritzer
- Best Short Story: "Better Living Through Algorithms" by Naomi Kritzer
- Best Series: Imperial Radch by Ann Leckie
- Best Graphic Story or Comic: Saga vol. 11 by Brian K. Vaughan and Fiona Staples
- Best Related Work: A City on Mars by Kelly Weinersmith and Zach Weinersmith
- Best Dramatic Presentation, Long Form: Dungeons and Dragons: Honor Among Thieves, screenplay by John Francis Daley, Jonathan Goldstein and Michael Gilio, directed by John Francis Daley and Jonathan Goldstein (Paramount Pictures)
- Best Dramatic Presentation, Short Form: The Last of Us: Long, Long Time, written by Craig Mazin and Neil Druckmann, directed by Peter Hoar (Naughty Dog / Sony Pictures)
- Best Game or Interactive Work: Baldur's Gate 3, produced by Larian Studios
- Best Editor Short Form: Neil Clarke
- Best Editor Long Form: Ruoxi Chen
- Best Professional Artist: Rovina Cai
- Best Semiprozine: Strange Horizons
- Best Fanzine: Nerds of a Feather Flock Together
- Best Fancast: Octothorpe
- Best Fan Writer: Paul Weimer
- Best Fan Artist: Laya Rose
- Lodestar Award for Best Young Adult Book: To Shape a Dragon's Breath by Moniquill Blackgoose
- Astounding Award for Best New Writer: Xiran Jay Zhao

== Site selection ==
The site of the convention was chosen by members of the 80th World Science Fiction Convention. Glasgow was the only bid.

== See also ==
- Hugo Award
- Science fiction
- Speculative fiction
- World Science Fiction Society
- Worldcon

Preceded by 81st World Science Fiction Convention in Chengdu, China (2023)	List of Worldcons; 82nd World Science Fiction Convention; Glasgow 2024 in Glasgow, UK (2024)	Succeeded by 83rd World Science Fiction Convention; Seattle Worldcon 2025 in Seattle, Washington, United States (2025)
