= 84th World Science Fiction Convention =

84th Worldcon (2026)

LAcon V, the 84th World Science Fiction Convention
- Genre: Science fiction
- Dates: August 27 - 31, 2026
- Venue: Anaheim Convention Center (Arena & North Building)
- Location: Anaheim, California
- Country: United States
- Previous event: Seattle 2025
- Next event: Montréal Worldcon 2027
- Organizer: Southern California Institute for Fan Interests (SCIFI) Inc.
- Filing status: 501(c)(3)
- Website: lacon.org

The 84th World Science Fiction Convention (Worldcon), also known as LAcon V, was held on August 27–31, 2026, in Anaheim, California. The convention was chaired by Joyce Lloyd.

== Participants ==
=== Guests of Honor ===
- Barbara Hambly
- Ronald D. Moore
- Colleen Doran
- Dr. Anita Sengupta
- Tim Kirk
- Geri Sullivan
- Stan Sakai

=== Special Guests ===
- Ursula Vernon (toastmaster)
- Tracy Drain
- Terese Mason Pierre
- Tracey Baptiste

== Awards ==
The World Science Fiction Society administers and presents the Hugo Awards, the oldest and most noteworthy award for science fiction. Selection of the recipients is by vote of the Worldcon members. Categories include novels and short fiction, artwork, dramatic presentations, and various professional and fandom activities.

Other awards may be presented at Worldcon at the discretion of the individual convention committee. This has often included the national SF awards of the host country, such as the Japanese Seiun Awards as part of Nippon 2007, and the Prix Aurora Awards as part of Anticipation in 2009. The Astounding Award for Best New Writer and the Sidewise Award, though not sponsored by the Worldcon, are usually presented, as well as the Chesley Awards, the Prometheus Award, and others. In 2021, the Nommo Awards began presenting at Worldcon.

=== Hugo Awards ===
2,492 ballots were cast for the 2026 Hugo Awards, of which 2,490 were online ballots and 2 were paper ballots. The winners were:

- Best Novel: The Everlasting by Alix E. Harrow
- Best Novella: The River Has Roots by Amal El-Mohtar
- Best Novelette: "Never Eaten Vegetables" by H.H. Pak
- Best Short Story: "In My Country" by Thomas Ha
- Best Series: Old Man's War series by John Scalzi
- Best Graphic Story or Comic: A Wizard of Earthsea by Ursula K. Le Guin, adapted/illustrated by Fred Fordham
- Best Related Work: Inventing the Renaissance by Ada Palmer
- Best Dramatic Presentation, Long Form: Sinners, screenplay by Ryan Coogler, directed by Ryan Coogler
- Best Dramatic Presentation, Short Form: Murderbot: "All Systems Red": written by Paul Weitz & Chris Weitz, directed by Roseanne Liang
- Best Game or Interactive Work: Clair Obscur: Expedition 33
- Best Professional Editor, Short Form: Neil Clarke
- Best Professional Editor, Long Form: Diana M. Pho
- Best Professional Artist: John Picacio
- Best Semiprozine: Uncanny Magazine, publisher and editor-in-chief: Michael Damian Thomas; managing editor Monte Lin] poetry editor Betsy Aoki, podcast producers Erika Ensign and Steven Schapansky
- Best Fanzine: nerds of a feather, flock together, editors Roseanna Pendlebury, Arturo Serrano, Paul Weimer; senior editors Joe Sherry, G. Brown, Vance Kotrla
- Best Fancast: Hugo, Girl!, presented by Haley Zapal, Amy Salley, Lori Anderson, and Kevin Anderson
- Best Fan Writer: Jason Sanford
- Best Fan Artist: Yuumei
- Best Poem: "Hex Supply Customer Support Log" by Elis Montgomery (Strange Horizons).

=== Other Awards ===
- Lodestar Award for Best Young Adult Book: Coffeeshop in an Alternate Universe by C.B. Lee
- Astounding Award for Best New Writer: Antonia Hodgson

== Site selection ==
The site of the convention was chosen by members of the 82nd World Science Fiction Convention in August 2024. The bid for "Los Angeles" (Anaheim, California) was the only bid for 2026, and received 452 out of 531 votes; there were 19 ineligible preferences, and zero "none of the above" ballots.

Preceded by 83rd World Science Fiction Convention; Seattle Worldcon 2025 in Seattle, Washington, United States (2025)	List of Worldcons; 84th World Science Fiction Convention; LAcon V in Anaheim, California, United States (2026)	Succeeded by 85th World Science Fiction Convention; Montréal Worldcon 2027 in Montréal, Québec, Canada (2027)
