= Devan Barlow =

Author

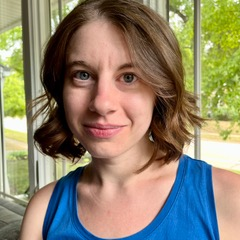
- Barlow in 2023
- Occupation: Poet/Writer
- Writing career
- Genre: Speculative fiction
- Website: devanbarlow.com

Devan Barlow is a poet and writer of speculative fiction. She was a finalist for the Hugo Award for Best Poem in 2025.

== Writing career ==
First published in 2016, Barlow has published more than three dozen speculative fiction short stories and forty poems in a variety of outlets, including the magazine Strange Horizons.

Barlow has self-published two novels and a collection of her short works, which focus on reimagining fairy tales and folklore through the perspective of characters that were minor to the original story. Her works incorporate elements of musical theater.

== Bibliography ==
=== Novels ===
==== Curses and Curtains series ====
- An Uncommon Curse (2023)
- An Uncertain Murder (2024)

=== Collections ===
- Foolish Hopes and Spilled Entrails: Retellings (2025)

== Awards ==
Year	Title	Award	Category	Result	Ref
2025	Your Visiting Dragon	Hugo Award	Hugo Award for Best Poem	Shortlisted	
