= Mari Ness =

American poet & author (born c.1971)

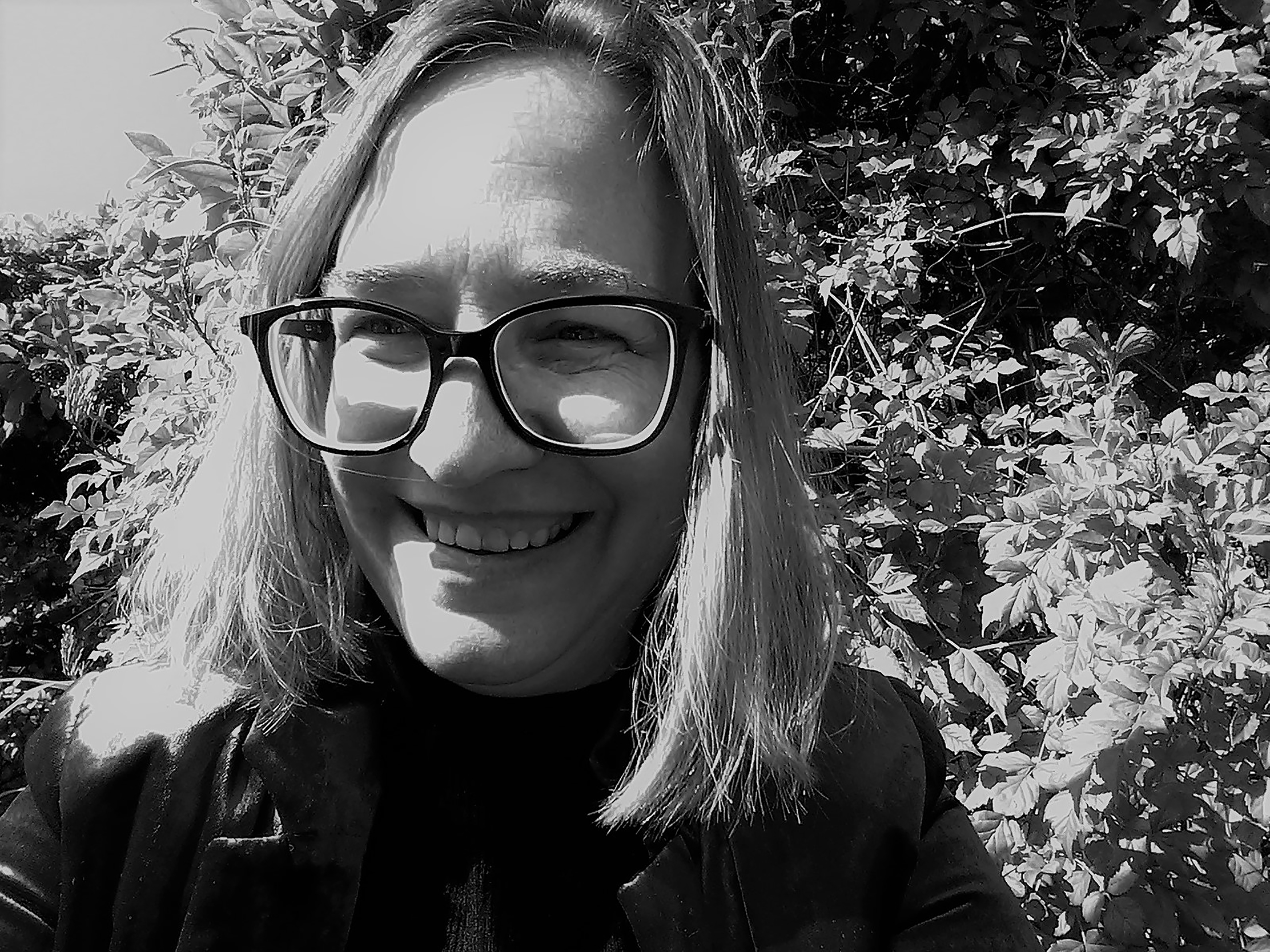
- Mari Ness in January 2020
- Born: c. 1971
- Occupation: Writer
- Writing career
- Genres: Science fiction and fantasy
- Website: marikness.wordpress.com

Mari Ness (born c. 1971) is an American poet, author, and critic. She has multiple publications in various science fiction and fantasy magazines and anthologies. Her work has been published in Apex Magazine, Clarkesworld, Daily Science Fiction, Fantasy Magazine, Fireside Magazine, Lightspeed, Nightmare Magazine, Strange Horizons, Tor.com, and Uncanny Magazine. In Locus, Paula Guran said of The Girl and the House that Ness: "subverts and glorifies the clichés and tropes of every gothic novel ever written, in less than 1,800 words" In 2025, her poem "Ever Noir" was a finalist for the Hugo Award for Best Poem.

== Career ==
Ness has been a panelist and guest at a number of science fiction conventions, including Worldcon in San Antonio in 2013, London in 2014, Dublin in 2019, and Glasgow in 2024. She has also appeared at OASIS 2019 in Orlando, Florida, and was scheduled to appear at CoNZealand 2020 in Wellington, New Zealand.

Ness is also noted for her critical reassessment of classic literary works. Among other analysis, she critiques the presence or lack of an appropriate disability narrative in works where characters have obvious disabilities. Her column on Tor.com, "Disney Read-Watch," which discussed Disney animated films and the classic tales that underlaid them, was a finalist for one of Reddit's 2016 "Stabby" Awards, given by the r/Fantasy subreddit for works related to the genre.

Her work has appeared in several anthologies, some of which have been reviewed in Publishers Weekly. Her short story, "The Ceremony", published in Fireside Quarterly in 2018, was on Locus's recommended reading list in 2018., as was her short story, "The Ruby of the Summer King," published in Lightspeed. Her other fiction that appeared in Lightspeed was noted favorably by Locus in 2017.

== Personal life ==
She lives in central Florida, though she has lived in upstate New York previously. Ness is a wheelchair user due to postural orthostatic tachycardia syndrome and vertigo. On occasion her experience with these informs her characters and stories and so too does her interests in technology and mythology and how they can resolve or cause issues. She also uses her position to call out events which are insufficiently accessible for people with disabilities.

== Selected works ==
=== Print anthologies ===
- "Note Left on a Coffee Table (Short Story, 2020) in dave ring Glitter + Ashes: Queer Tales of a World That Wouldn't Die Neon Hemlock Press.
- "The heart of the flame" (Poetry, 2016) in Vitale, Valeria, and Djibril al-Ayad. Fae Visions of the Mediterranean: An Anthology of Horrors and Wonders of the Sea.Futurefire.net Publishing.
- "Memories and wire." (Short Story, 2014) in Clarke, Neil. Upgraded Stirling, New Jersey: Wyrm Publishing.
- "And the Hollow Space Inside" (Short Story, 2012) republished in Clarke, Neil, and Sean Wallace, Clarkesworld Year Six (2014). Stirling, New Jersey: Wyrm Publishing.
- "Do Not Imagine" (Poem, 2012) in Moreno-Garcia, Silvia, and Paula R. Stiles, Future Lovecraft. Gaithersburg, MD: Prime Books.
- "Snowmelt" (Poetry, 2011) republished in Gardner, Lyn C. A., et al., The 2012 Rhysling Anthology: The Best Science Fiction, Fantasy, and Horror Poetry of 2011. (2012) Covina, CA: Science Fiction Poetry Association.
- "Twittering the Stars" (Short Story, 2010) in De Vries, Jetse, and Jason Andrew, Shine: an anthology of near-future, optimistic science fiction. Oxford: Solaris.

=== Collections ===
- Through Immortal Shadows Singing (lyric poetry, 2017) West Yorkshire, UK: Papaveria Press
- Resistance and Transformation: On Fairy Tales (essays, 2021) Aqueduct Press

=== Short fiction ===
- Letter to an Overly Ambitious Alien Chef of the Future (2005)
- Kittensplodge and the Awful Correspondence (2006)
- Assistant (2007)
- End of Time (2007)
- The Shadow in the Mirror (2008)
- Wooden Apologies (2009)
- Playing with Spades (2009)
- Rumpled Skin (2009)
- Ravens (2010)
- Sparks (2010)
- Mademoiselle and the Chevalier (2010)
- In the Pits of Isfhan (2011)
- Dreams of Elephants and Ice (2011)
- Sister and Bones (2011)
- Love in the Absence of Mosquitoes (2011)
- Green (2011)
- Trickster (2011)
- Twelve Days of Dragons (2011)
- Copper, Iron, Blood and Love (2012)
- A Different Rain (2012)
- Nameless (2012)
- The Agreement (2012)
- A Cellar of Terrible Things (2012)
- Shattered Amber (2012)
- Labyrinth (2012)
- Safe (2012)
- Marmalette (2013)
- Palatina (2013)
- The Godmother (2013)
- The Princess and Her Tale (2013)
- Stronger Than the Wind, Stronger Than the Sea (2013)
- Seaweed (2013)
- The Gifts: Part One (2013)
- The Gifts: Part Two (2013)
- The Gifts: Part Three (2013)
- An Assault of Color (2013)
- In the Greenwood (2013)
- The Dragon and the Bond (2013)
- Ink (2014)
- Toads (2014)
- Undone (2014)
- Coffin (2014)
- Death and Death Again (2014)
- Beans and Lies (2014)
- The Knot (2015)
- The Fox Bride (2015)
- Inhabiting Your Skin (2015)
- The Dollmaker's Rage (2015)
- Sometimes Heron (2015)
- The Petals (2015)
- Sea Dreams (2015)
- The Forge (2015)
- The Huntsmen (2016)
- Cat Play (2016)
- The Game (2016)
- My Own Damn Heaven (2016)
- Deathlight (2016)
- Mistletoe and Copper, Water and Herbs (2016)
- The Middle Child's Practical Guide to Surviving a Fairy Tale (2016)
- Coffee, Love and Leaves (2016)
- Dragonbone (2016)
- Nine Songs (2016)
- The Cat Signal (2016)
- Souls (2016)
- Hundreds (2016)
- The Lion (2017)
- We Need to Talk About the Unicorn in Your Back Yard (2017)
- The Witch in the Tower (2017)
- Stealing Tales (2017)
- Gingerbread Smoke (2017)
- You Will Never Know What Opens (2017)
- Pipers Piping (2017)
- Purchases (2018)
- Shadows and Bells (2018)
- The Sword (2018)
- Memories of Monsters (2018)
- The Ceremony (2018)
- Mercy (2018)
- Feather Ties (2019)
- The Girl and the House (2019)
- The Wolf (2019)
- Transformation, Afterwards (2019)

=== Poetry ===
- Waiting (2008)
- Ino (2009)
- Dancing (2010)
- Sleep (2010)
- Quoth the Cultist (2010)
- Grandma and the Puka (2011)
- Nile Song (2011)
- Soul Streets (2011)
- Encantada (2011)
- Raven Singing (2011)
- Silence (2011)
- Petals (2011)
- Frenzy (2011)
- Cold Comfort (2011)
- Do Not Imagine (2011)
- Tongueless (2012)
- Laurels (2012)
- Moondance (2012)
- Sisters (2012)
- Gleaming (2013)
- Walking Home (2013)
- The Loss (2013)
- Feather (2014)
- The Restoration of Youth (2014)
- Bone Song (2014)
- Nausicca's Mother Explains It All (2014)
- The Silver Comb (2014)
- Demands (2014)
- After the Dance (2015)
- The Thirteenth Child (2015)
- After Midnight (2016)
- Ice (2016)
- The Study (2017)
- O Ippos (2017)
- Through Immortal Shadows Singing (2017)
- Hunter (2017)
- Expecting a Dinosaur (2018)

== Awards ==
Year	Title	Award	Category	Result	Ref
2016	The Disney Read-Watch (Tor.com)	Stabby Award	Best Related Work	Shortlisted	
2021	Dancing in Silver Lands	OutWrite Chapbook Competition	Fiction	Won	
2023	Verisya	Canopus Award	Short-Form Fiction	Shortlisted	
2025	Ever Noir	Hugo Award	Hugo Award for Best Poem	Shortlisted	
2025	Care for Lightning	Nebula Award	Nebula Award for Best Poetry	Shortlisted	
2026	Care for Lightning	Hugo Award	Hugo Award for Best Poem	Pending	
