= The Road of Needles =

Short story by Caitlín R. Kiernan

"The Road of Needles" is a 2013 science fiction short story, by Caitlín R. Kiernan. It was first published in the anthology Beyond the Woods: Fairy Tales Retold.

== Synopsis ==
As Nix Severn tries to repair her spaceship's damaged AI and out-of-control terraforming engines, she finds herself reliving the story of Little Red Riding Hood.

== Reception ==
"The Road of Needles" won the 2014 Locus Award for Best Short Story, and was a finalist for the 2016 Seiun Award for Best Translated Short Story.

Lois Tilton considered it to be "cluttered", but emphasized that "the elements [of the story] do work together", noting that "the journey means more than what happens once [Severn] arrives". Publishers Weekly (reviewing Kiernan's 2018 collection The Dinosaur Tourist) called it "creepy".
