= The Thing About Ghost Stories =

Short story

"The Thing About Ghost Stories" is a 2018 fantasy short story by Naomi Kritzer. It was first published in Uncanny Magazine.

== Synopsis ==
Leah is a folklorist studying ghost stories, who gradually becomes aware that she may be living in one herself.

== Reception ==
"The Thing About Ghost Stories" was a finalist for the 2019 Hugo Award for Best Novelette.

At Tor.com, Katharine Duckett lauded Kritzer's portrayal of the parallels between ghost stories and living with a dementia patient, as well as of Leah's "instantly engaging voice".
