= Cat Pictures Please =

2015 science fiction short story

"Cat Pictures Please" is a 2015 science fiction short story by American writer Naomi Kritzer. It was first published in Clarkesworld Magazine.

== Synopsis ==
When an artificial intelligence spontaneously emerges from the systems that run a search engine, it realizes that it wants two things: firstly, it wants to secretly help humans, and secondly, it wants to look at pictures of cats. However, despite the ease with which it fulfills its second goal, its first goal is far more difficult than it had anticipated.

== Reception ==
"Cat Pictures Please" won the 2016 Hugo Award for Best Short Story and the 2016 Locus Award for Best Short Story, and was a finalist for the Nebula Award for Best Short Story of 2015. Lois Tilton called it "amusing" and "lite", but emphasized "how easily good intentions can backfire", while Apex Magazine's Charlotte Ashley commended the AI's "warm, human voice" and "fundamental sense of goodwill", but faulted Kritzer for portraying it as "improbably US-centric" and for ignoring larger problems in the world.

== Sequels ==
In 2017, Kritzer announced that she was writing a full-length novel based on the premise. The novel, Catfishing on CatNet, was published with Tor Teen in 2019. In 2021 Tor Teen published a second novel, Chaos on CatNet.
