= Calypso (2024 novel) =

2024 novel by Oliver K. Langmead

Calypso is a 2024 "novel in verse" by Oliver K. Langmead and published by Penguin Random House. It follows the experiences of a crew of biologists on a colony ark as they recover from cryosleep. It has been nominated for a British Science Fiction Association award and a Hugo Award.

== Themes ==
Molly Templeton of Esquire stated that "like so many generation ship stories, this is an elegantly told meditation on how we can’t leave ourselves behind. Any new world will be seeded with what we know, what we’ve learned, who we are, for better or for worse." Robert Goodman of The Newtown Review of Books has argued that the novels centres around "the question of whether we can leave our basic humanity behind. What is the psychological and social baggage that humans carry with them? Is it possible to start again with a clean slate?"

Nataliia Sova of Strange Horizons wrote that "curiously, all the characters in this novella, regardless of what they believe in, prove to be creators. Indeed, this theme of creation, creativity, and birth is one of the most prominent in the book," saying that there were elements of both eco-fiction and cyberpunk genres.

In an interview, Langmean stated that the book was "about terraforming and transformation," saying that "a lot of Calypso comes from Paradise Lost, and figuring out fascinating ways of translating Milton’s interpretation of the biblical Genesis into something sweeping and science-fictional."

== Reception ==
Molly Templeton of Esquire named Calypso as one of the 30 best science fiction novels of 2024, saying that it was "ambitious and immersive" and that "Langmead’s verse creates a sense of spareness, of space unfilled, that echoes the loneliness Rochelle feels." Writing for The Guardian, Adam Roberts named the novel among the 5 best science fiction books of 2024, describing it as a "unique and memorable work" that " inhabits a variety of verse forms including syllabic verse, loose blank verse, alexandrines and concrete poetry; not a gimmick but an integral part of its effectiveness. The form and telling recall Paradise Lost, but the heart of the story is more bucolic: a space-opera eclogue."

Robert Goodman of The Newtown Review of Books wrote that the novel "not only tells a fascinating story but raises some deep philosophical issues about the potential ethics of generational space travel and colonisation," saying that it "surprises not just in its form but in its approach to the ethical, moral and social issues bound up in this kind of endeavour." Nataliia Sova of Strange Horizons wrote that the novel's "philosophical and religious undertones, its cinematic scenes, memorable characters, and overall artistry combine to create a unique aesthetic experience," saying that "in recent years, perhaps only Harry Josephine Giles’s Deep Wheel Orcadia offers something similar."

Publishers Weekly reviewed the novel as a "demanding novel-in-verse" that was a "lush sensory experience," while warning that "at the climax, however, polyphony turns to cacophony and the latent Christian themes become overpowering."
