= 85th World Science Fiction Convention =

85th Worldcon (2027)

Montréal Worldcon 2027
- Status: Upcoming
- Genre: Science fiction
- Dates: 2-6 September 2027
- Venue: Palais des congrès de Montréal
- Location: Montreal
- Country: Canada
- Previous event: LAcon V
- Organizer: CanSMOF
- Website: montreal2027.ca

The 85th World Science Fiction Convention (Worldcon), also known as Montréal Worldcon 2027, will be held on September 2-6, 2027, in Montreal, Quebec. The convention will be chaired by Bruce Farr.

== Guests of Honour ==
- Jo Walton
- Yves Meynard
- Chris M. Barkley
- Jeph Jacques
- Linda D. Addison
- Cory Doctorow

== Site selection ==
The site of the convention was chosen by members of the 83rd World Science Fiction Convention in August 2025. The bid for Montreal was the only bid for 2027, and received 605 out of 682 votes; there were 16 write-in ballots, 16 'no preference', and 45 'none of the above' ballots.

Preceded by 84th World Science Fiction Convention; LAcon V in Anaheim, California, United States (2026)	List of Worldcons; 85th World Science Fiction Convention; Montréal Worldcon 2027 in Montréal, Québec, Canada (2027)	Succeeded by
