= Witchy =

Fantasy webcomic by Ariel Slamet Ries

- Nyneve, the comic's protagonist
- Author: Ariel Slamet Ries
- Website: http://witchycomic.com/
- Current status/schedule: Hiatus
- Launch date: 2014

Witchy is a fantasy webcomic by Ariel Slamet Ries that started in 2014, and has been on hiatus since 2022. The webcomic follows the young witch Nyneve in a world where magical proficiency is based on the length of one's hair. Though the world of Witchy is culturally and ethnically diverse, its characters are marginalized based on their hair length. Witchy was nominated for an Ignatz award in 2015 and won the award in 2020.

== Synopsis ==
The webcomic Witchy is set in a world where the length of one's hair indicates the magical proficiency one has, and people with long hair are considered enemies of the state. Witchy follows the story of the young witch Nyneve, whose long-haired father was burned at the stake by the kingdom's royal "Witch Guard" while she was still a child. As she grows older, Nyneve has to decide whether she will accept being conscripted into the Witch Guard or go rogue. She hides the length of her hair while outside of her house to avoid conscription, while her classmates at school each have their own problems and ambitions.

Ziah Grace of ComicsAlliance described Witchy as a webcomic about the systems of a society: "both the ability of a widespread system to continue and the ability of the individual to survive within them." Grace describes Nyneve as the "product of a society that grinds up outliers." Nyneve's situation is contrasted with that of her classmate Prill, who finds herself much more accepted into the society but who feels ostracized at home.

== Development ==
Ariel Ries is an animation student at The Animation Workshop in Denmark and Witchy is their first major project. They wrote the story for their webcomic during 2012 and 2013: Witchy was originally intended to be a short story about a witch village where witches were slowly disappearing into the surrounding woods. The hair-based hierarchy was centered on color at the time, and the protagonist would dye her hair to disguise the fact that she was weak. Ries decided to go with hair length instead after a friend brought up the idea, and they wanted to create a society where prejudice was not based on race, gender, sexuality, or disability. Witchy was initially very derivative of the fantasy works by Jean Giraud, but Ries later decided they wanted their webcomic to be inspired by Asia rather than Europe. Ries created the kingdom in which Witchy takes place as a very ethnically-diverse place; they have stated that they imagine it as a "sort of Asian melting pot kingdom."

As a student, Ries almost exclusively works on Witchy during the weekend; if they weren't able to finish the inking and coloring of a page on Sunday, they would "chip away" at it for the rest of the week. Witchy updates every Tuesday, but Ries has a two-week buffer in place in case they can't finish a page in time. Ries is invested in the representation of characters that are underrepresented in media, which inspired them to include characters of various ethnicities, as well as a transgender character. In an interview with ComicsAlliance, Ries noted that they failed to properly plan its magic system when they started creating Witchy, resulting in them being caught by surprise when they got to drawing this aspect of their webcomic. The magic system is primarily inspired by various Asian religions, such as Shintoism and Mun, as well as the rules and techniques of several different dance styles and martial arts. Ries stated that they have many ideas they want to incorporate for Witchy's magic system, but have had difficulty organizing their concepts properly.

During the development of Witchy, Ries has switched over from using traditional ink for their artwork, to using Adobe Photoshop and later Clip Studio Paint. As Witchy is Ries' first major project, they aimed to be open to experimentation, and Ries has stated that their artstyle has gradually shifted over time. Ries plans for the plot have similarly changed over time, as their priority towards character growth adjusted greatly. According to Ries, developing the story very slowly has helped them improve the plot, as they have months to work out problems.

In March 2019, Lion Forge Comics announced a print collection of Witchy, to be published beginning in September 2019, featuring the first four chapters of the comic.

A second print collection, featuring chapters 5 and 6, was published in February 2022.

== Reception ==
Ziah Grace of ComicsAlliance stated that Ries' art is "wonderfully developed", likening the backgrounds of Witchy to those in the films of Hayao Miyazaki and comparing the scratchy and detailed linework to that of Jake Wyatt's Necropolis. Grace described Witchy as "an incredible first project from a rising talent." Mey of Autostraddle praised Witchy's worldbuilding and its original set of rules for its magic system. Mey was also appreciative of the transfem character Prill and her snarky and confident demeanor. Sarah Hunter of The Booklist Reader remarked that Ries "inflects the characters and universe of Hyalin with issues and concerns that will resonate with contemporary readers."

In 2015, Witchy was nominated for an Ignatz award in the "Outstanding Online Comic" category. It won the award in 2020.

== See also ==
- Strange Bedfellows - graphic novel by Ries
