= Strange Bedfellows (graphic novel) =

2025 graphic novel by Ariel Slamet Ries

- Page count: 288 pages
- Publisher: HarperAlley

Creative team
- Creator: Ariel Slamet Ries

Original publication
- Date of publication: March 4, 2025
- Language: English
- ISBN: 9780063158085

Strange Bedfellows is a graphic novel written and illustrated by Ariel Slamet Ries. It was published on March 4, 2025 by HarperAlley.

== Plot Summary ==
In a distant planet in the future where most of humanity has superpowers, trans college dropout Oberon Afolayan spontaneously develops the ability to manifest his dreams into reality. A dream version of his former crush Kon begins appearing in real life, and assists Oberon in controlling his powers and getting his life back on track. However, Kon hides a dark truth, and Oberon's insecurities threatens them as his powers grow increasingly difficult to control.

== Reception ==
The book was positively reviewed by Kirkus Reviews which noted the surrealist art, diverse cast, and themes of "forgiveness, love, and family". Publishers' Weekly gave the book a starred review. The School Library Journal gave a more mixed review, praising the artwork and main romance but criticizing the inclusion of underdeveloped plot points and unnecessary details. The Beat praised the art, stating "Ries’s continually evolving bright pastel color palette is nothing short of dreamy" and citing the character of Oberon's boss Fior as a highlight. E.B. Hutchins of The Beat named it one of the Best Comics of 2025, citing Ries' confidence in "discussing their themes of collectivism, family bonds, and the maintenance of cultural practices".

=== Accolades ===
Year	Award/Honor	Result	Ref.
2026	Nebula Award for Best Comics	Shortlisted	
2025	Harvey Award for Best Young Adult Book	Shortlisted	
2025	Aurealis Award for Best Illustrated Book or Graphic Novel	Shortlisted	
2025	The Beat’s Best Comics of 2025	Included	

== See also ==
- Witchy - webcomic by Ries
