= Benedict Jablonski =

American science fiction enthusiast

Benedict Paul Jablonski (March 18, 1917 – May 15, 2003), also known as Ben Jason, was an American science fiction fan and booster who co-designed the Hugo Award based on a rocket-shaped hood ornament from an Oldsmobile 88.

He was also chairman of the 1966 World Science Fiction Convention in his hometown of Cleveland, Ohio at which Gene Roddenberry previewed the two-hour pilot of his new series, Star Trek, for science fiction fans.

Jablonski was the son of Polish immigrants Stanislaw Jablonski and Helen Szymanski. He died in Brunswick, Ohio at the age of 86.
