= Locus Award for Best Short Story =

Literary award by Locus magazine

The Locus Award for Best Short Story is one of a series of Locus Awards given every year by Locus magazine. Awards presented in a given year are for works published in the previous calendar year. Originally known as the Locus Award for Best Short Fiction, the first award in this category was presented in 1971.

== Winners ==
Award winners
Year	Short story	Author	Publication	Ref.
1971	The Region Between	Harlan Ellison		
1972	The Queen of Air and Darkness	Poul Anderson		
1973	Basilisk	Harlan Ellison		
1974	The Deathbird	Harlan Ellison		
1975	The Day Before the Revolution	Ursula K. Le Guin		
1976	Croatoan	Harlan Ellison		
1977	Tricentennial	Joe Haldeman		
1978	Jeffty Is Five	Harlan Ellison		
1979	Count the Clock that Tells the Time	Harlan Ellison		
1980	The Way of Cross and Dragon	George R. R. Martin		
1981	Grotto of the Dancing Deer	Clifford D. Simak		
1982	The Pusher	John Varley		
1983	Sur	Ursula K. Le Guin		
1984	Beyond the Dead Reef	James Tiptree Jr.		
1985	Salvador	Lucius Shepard		
1986	With Virgil Oddum at the East Pole	Harlan Ellison		
1987	Robot Dreams	Isaac Asimov		
1988	Angel	Pat Cadigan		
1989	Eidolons	Harlan Ellison		
1990	Lost Boys	Orson Scott Card		
1991	Bears Discover Fire	Terry Bisson		
1992	Buffalo	John Kessel		
1993	Even the Queen	Connie Willis		
1994	Close Encounter	Connie Willis		
1995	None So Blind	Joe Haldeman		
1996	The Lincoln Train	Maureen F. McHugh		
1997	Gone	John Crowley		
1998	Itsy Bitsy Spider	James Patrick Kelly		
1999	Maneki Neko	Bruce Sterling		
2000	macs	Terry Bisson		
2001	The Missing Mass	Larry Niven		
2002	The Bones of the Earth	Ursula K. Le Guin		
2003	October in the Chair	Neil Gaiman		
2004	Closing Time	Neil Gaiman		
2005	Forbidden Brides of the Faceless Slaves in the Nameless House of the Night of Dread Desire	Neil Gaiman		
2006	Sunbird	Neil Gaiman		
2007	How to Talk to Girls at Parties	Neil Gaiman		
2008	A Small Room in Koboldtown	Michael Swanwick		
2009	Exhalation	Ted Chiang		
2010	An Invocation of Incuriosity	Neil Gaiman	Songs of the Dying Earth	
2011	The Thing About Cassandra	Neil Gaiman	Songs of Love and Death	
2012	The Case of Death and Honey	Neil Gaiman	A Study in Sherlock	
2013	Immersion	Aliette de Bodard	Clarkesworld #69	
2014	The Road of Needles	Caitlín R. Kiernan	Once Upon a Time: New Fairy Tales	
2015	The Truth About Owls	Amal El-Mohtar	Kaleidoscope	
2016	Cat Pictures Please	Naomi Kritzer	Clarkesworld #110	
2017	Seasons of Glass and Iron	Amal El-Mohtar	The Starlit Wood	
2018	The Martian Obelisk	Linda Nagata	Tor.com	
2019	The Secret Lives of the Nine Negro Teeth of George Washington	P. Djèlí Clark	Fireside #52	
2020	The Bookstore at the End of America	Charlie Jane Anders	A People's Future of the United States	
2021	Little Free Library	Naomi Kritzer	Tor.com	
2022	Where Oaken Hearts Do Gather	Sarah Pinsker	Uncanny #39	
2023	Rabbit Test	Samantha Mills	Uncanny #49	
2024	How to Raise a Kraken in Your Bathtub	P. Djèlí Clark	Uncanny #50	
2025	Why Don't We Just Kill the Kid In the Omelas Hole	Isabel J. Kim	Clarkesworld	
2026	In My Country	Thomas Ha	Clarkesworld 4/25	
