= Caves of Qud =

2024 video game

- Developer: Freehold Games
- Publisher: Kitfox Games
- Designers: Brian Bucklew; Jason Grinblat; Caelyn Sandel; Nick DeCapua
- Artists: Samuel Wilson; Cyril van der Haegen
- Composers: Craigory Hamilton; Brandon Tanner
- Engine: Unity
- Platforms: Windows, macOS, Linux, Nintendo Switch
- Release: Windows, macOS, Linux; December 5, 2024; Switch; February 16, 2026; Switch 2; TBA
- Genres: Roguelike, role-playing
- Mode: Single-player

Caves of Qud is a roguelike role-playing video game developed by Freehold Games and published by Kitfox Games. It is set in an open world that is partially pre-made and partially procedurally generated. The game takes place in a post-apocalyptic science fantasy setting and is inspired by the pen-and-paper role-playing games Gamma World and Dungeons & Dragons.

== Gameplay ==
A player has their reputation with various factions change due to their decisions and relationships.

Unlike other traditional roguelikes such as NetHack, Caves of Qud has a quest system as a core mechanic. Some quests are scripted, while others are procedurally generated. Players can choose to follow the main quest line, but can also choose to ignore it and play the game without following the pre-written plot. When creating a character, the player can choose between playing as a True Kin or a mutant. True Kin, being unmutated humans, have higher base stats and access to cybernetic augmentations, while mutants can possess physical and mental mutations offering a wide range of utility. By default, the player character will start in the unique village of Joppa, but it is also possible to choose to spawn in a procedurally generated town.

Caves of Qud has "deeply simulated physical and political systems" which are randomly generated and different each session. At the start of each run, the game generates a set of historical events and group relationships centered around a set of five randomly generated ancient rulers, dubbed Sultans. It takes inspiration from the history systems of the games Dwarf Fortress and Epitaph. The procedural history system is based on historical accounts such as word of mouth and ancient texts, allowing for bias and conflicting perspectives.

== Development ==
American studio Freehold Games began development on Caves of Qud in 2007, with the first public beta released in 2010. Caves of Qud was released on Steam in 2015, under their early access model. Content was gradually added through weekly updates.

In July 2023, Kitfox Games, the publisher of the Steam version of Dwarf Fortress, announced that they would be publishing the 1.0 version of Caves of Qud the following year. The game was fully released on December 5, 2024. A Nintendo Switch port was released on February 16, 2026. A Nintendo Switch 2 Edition was announced in September 2026, with no release date.

== Reception ==
Reception

Aggregate scores
| Aggregator | Score |
|---|---|
| Metacritic | 91/100 |
| OpenCritic | 100% recommend |

Review scores
| Publication | Score |
|---|---|
| Edge | 8/10 |
| Eurogamer | 5/5 |
| PC Gamer (US) | 94% |

=== Early access ===
While most reviewers during the game's early access period rated the game highly for being more accessible than other roguelikes, some found the game's interface confusing.

=== Full release ===
The version 1.0 release of Caves of Qud received "universal acclaim" from critics, according to review aggregator website Metacritic.

Reviewing the game for PC Gamer, Jonathan Bolding writes that Caves of Qud has likely the "best, most modern interface and controls in a game of its kind." He named the game's deep world simulation the "best one [he's] ever played."

=== Awards ===
| Year | Award | Category | Result | Ref. |
|---|---|---|---|---|
| 2024 | D.I.C.E. Awards | Strategy/Simulation Game of the Year | Nominated | |
| 2025 | Independent Games Festival | Excellence In Narrative | Won | |
| 2025 | Hugo Award | Best Game or Interactive Work | Won | |
| 2025 | Golden Joystick Awards | Best Indie Game | Nominated | |
