= These Memories Do Not Belong To Us =

2025 novel by Yiming Ma

- Author: Yiming Ma
- Language: English
- Genre: Science fiction
- Publisher: Mariner Books
- Publication date: 2025
- Publication place: Canada

These Memories Do Not Belong To Us is a 2025 science fiction novel by Chinese Canadian author Yiming Ma, set in a world where memories can be transferred between minds, and a reimagined China known as the Qin Empire has become the sole global superpower.

The book was longlisted for the Goodreads Choice Award in Science Fiction and chosen as a “Best Book of 2025” by PEN America, Electric Lit as well as other media outlets.

== Background ==
Ma began writing the novel in early 2020, before the COVID-19 pandemic went global. Ma has credited Polish writer Olga Tokarczuk's novel Flights and Kazuo Ishiguro’s Never Let Me Go as significant influences.

The novel's cover was designed by artist Ploy Siripant. In Electric Literature, Siripant stated that her goal with the cover was to "convey the nostalgic memories and dystopian future within one image," saying that the yellow chrysanthemum flower she chose "immediately evoked a strong connection to Chinese and Asian cultures. And the pixel dispersion effect was the perfect solution to expressing the speculative technology in the book and tying all the elements eloquently back to the title."

== Synopsis ==
The novel begins with an unnamed narrator in the far-future Qin Empire inheriting a collection of memories via Mindbank technology, devices implanted in every citizen’s head that allow for memories to be recorded, bought and sold. The narrator soon realizes that these memories are banned by the Qin empire, placing his freedom and life in jeopardy. The book delves into eleven illicit Memory Epics, set before and after the War in which the Qin Empire conquers the world. The memories are written in diverse styles, ranging from tales of a sumo wrestler to an AI interrogation featuring poems by Kaveh Akbar.

== Themes and analysis ==
In an interview with Michael Zapata of the Chicago Review of Books, Ma stated that "I became obsessed by the idea of memory as this great equalizer—that when everything else was stripped away, at least we would still have our pasts. Then I had a chilling thought: What if even our memories were no longer safe?"

Writing in the Writer's Digest, Ma stated that "at its heart, it’s a book about survival and resistance," saying that "as an immigrant, I grew up believing that I did not have the privilege to resist against any individuals or institutions that represented authority. In a way, I wrote this book partly to explore what small resistances I could imagine mustering under the most frightening scenarios—whether confronting Artificial General Intelligence, or memory surveillance, or the brutal life of a sumo wrestler—in the hope that it might resonate with others who feel similarly powerless amid overwhelming odds." In an article in The Globe and Mail, Ma wrote that "I was forced to confront the chilling reality that under authoritarianism, regardless of surveillance technologies such as the Mindbanks I conceived of, it is always the citizens who police themselves most closely. In my fictional world, the ambiguity of what memories were legal to store in one’s memory device served to amplify the power of censorship, leading citizens to proactively delete or edit their pasts. Understandably, if you could imagine yourself in their shoes, how close to that red line would you really want to go? Especially if you belonged to a less powerful identity group, if you couldn’t afford to resist? But as my narrator soon discovers, censorship follows no logical pattern. What seems safe today may be dangerous tomorrow."

== Reception ==
Publishers Weekly described the book as "a chilling dystopian novel" that "leaves readers with much to chew on." Jennifer Renken of the Library Journal wrote that "readers of literary dystopian fiction will find much to enjoy in this thought-provoking debut." In a review for Strait Times, Shawn Hoo compared the book to David Mitchell’s Cloud Atlas and described it as “a spirited defence of how stories survive in an age of control and suppression” as well as “a treat to read.”

Writing in Locus Magazine, Niall Harrison said that "I never felt the projected future quite cohered, which is also to say that I found it easier to read These Memories Do Not Belong To Us as a collection rather than a novel. In that light, it makes for rewarding reading: Ma is clearly a writer with interesting things to say, and the skill to say them in interesting ways. But no luminous shining pattern emerged in my mind; no whole greater than its parts. It remained, to the end, less of a constellation, and more of a scatterplot." Writing for the Winnipeg Free Press, Joel Boyce ended the review by writing, “Yiming Ma’s deft, layered commentary on how democracy dies is unfortunately only too relevant. This may be one of the most important books published this year.”

The book was chosen as a "Best Book of 2025" by PEN America, Electric Lit, Debutiful, and Booklist. It was selected as a Spotify Editors’ Pick and longlisted for the Goodreads Choice Awards in Science Fiction.
