= Old Skies =

- Developer: Dave Gilbert
- Publisher: Wadjet Eye Games
- Designer: Dave Gilbert
- Artist: Ben Chandler
- Writer: Dave Gilbert
- Composer: Thomas Regin
- Engine: Adventure Game Studio
- Platforms: Linux; macOS; Nintendo Switch; Windows
- Release: WW: Apr 23, 2025; (macOS, Linux, Windows): WW: May 27, 2025; (Nintendo Switch)
- Genre: Adventure
- Mode: Single-player

Old Skies is a point-and-click adventure game created by Dave Gilbert and published by Wadjet Eye Games in 2025. It is a science fiction story about a time traveler who is employed by an agency that sends her into the past of New York City to observe or make minor alterations to historical events. It takes place in the same universe as the Blackwell series and several characters make a cameo appearance.

Old Skies received generally favorable reviews by critics, with the story being especially praised. The chapter involving the protagonist stopping a murder around the events of the September 11 attacks was commended for its respectful treatment of the subject matter and exploring the reactions of everyday people affected by it.

== Gameplay ==
Old Skies is presented in third-person perspective with animation, navigating 2D screens representing various time periods of New York City. Unlike previous Wadjet Eye Games that used pixel art due to a reduced resolution, Old Skies has a display resolution of 1920 x 1080 and utilizes a hand-drawn art style. Interaction is performed via a context-sensitive cursor, allowing the player to examine objects, pick up items, and converse with non-playable characters. The game emphasizes exploration, dialogue, and inventory-based puzzles. Players collect, combine, and use items to overcome obstacles or persuade characters to assist Fia.

In addition to mundane objects she finds while on missions, Fia has futuristic technology allowing her to unlock doors, create period-appropriate currency, and silently communicate with her handler in the future, as well as access to historical archives from 2062 that automatically update in the event of a change to the timeline. In several chapters, Fia can travel freely between the same area on two different dates (such as April and October of 1871), allowing her to alter the past or utilize future knowledge to her benefit.

Whenever Fia dies, the "emergency rewind protocol" activates, rewinding time to a few moments before her death, and allowing her to take different actions using her new knowledge. Multiple puzzles involve Fia being in a situation where nearly every action results in her death, creating a time loop that she must learn how to escape. Through trial and error, new insight from the failed attempts can be pieced together for a final solution that prevents Fia's death and allows her to escape the time loop.

== Plot ==
In 2062, Fia Quinn is employed by ChronoZen, an agency with an exclusive monopoly on time travel. Her job as an agent is to accompany wealthy clients on trips to the past to observe historical events or alter history in non-critical ways. Whenever the past is altered, a "chronoshift" occurs in the future as it adapts to the new historical reality, which can result in people and places no longer existing.

Frank "Nozzo" Nozzarelli works as Fia's handler, operating the time travel machinery in 2062 and is able to communicate with Fia while she is in the past. Fia is also mentored in between missions by Duffy, a fellow ChronoZen agent. Over the course of six chapters, Fia is sent on missions to various time periods of New York City.

=== Chapter One: Dine's Up ===
Fia escorts the famous inventor Dr. Joe Anderson to 2024 so that he can revisit his favorite restaurant while he was in college. He sneaks away from Fia and attempts to make an unapproved modification to history to prevent a woman he loved from dying in an explosion in 2029. Fia foils his attempt, but because he broke equipment used for time travel in order to escape from Fia, he is unable to return home or stay in the past, and Fia is forced to eliminate him to preserve history.

=== Chapter Two: Time's Champion ===
The retired boxer Chloe Sadar hires ChronoZen to take her to 1871 so she can meet her role model, a boxer named Simon Inman. Unbeknownst to her and Fia, he is involved in organized crime. Simon leads an extortion operation and kills Fia and Chloe to eliminate witnesses, but a time loop is created by the emergency rewind protocol, allowing Fia to stop Simon and save their lives. Humiliated, Simon commits suicide, which results in changes to history, notably that Simon never fought an important fight that inspired Chloe to become a boxer.

To restore history, Fia and Chloe discover that Simon's uncle is the head of a criminal gang. Simon was resistant to join, but eventually did after the death of his younger sister Paula. The pair travel several months further into the past and save Paula, which removes his motivation for joining his uncle's gang. After Simon's uncle kidnaps Chloe, Fia and Chloe convince Simon to take control of his uncle's gang and dismantle it. While this saves Simon's life, he refuses to continue boxing after admitting that he only won due to match fixing. Chloe boxes in his place in the important fight Simon previously fought, resulting in history being altered so that she becomes her own inspiration.

=== Chapter Three: Time Doesn't Pay ===
An art historian named Imani Camron travels with Fia to 1923 in the hopes of proving that a certain unsigned painting was actually created by an artist going by the pseudonym "Pie Sycamore." While there, Imani becomes ill as a side effect of being in close proximity to her ancestor and must return to 2062 while Fia continues the mission, but Imani's travel through time is witnessed by a pair of criminals, one of whom reveals that he is the son of Pie Sycamore.

Fia is forced to work with them and eventually meets Pie Sycamore, discovering that she is in fact Paula Inman, the younger sister of Simon Inman whom she rescued as a little girl in 1871. Paula begins to paint, but instead of producing the painting that Imani expected, she paints Fia as an angel. While the mission did not go as planned, Imani considers it a success. To hide their identities, the criminals change their last name in response to one of Fia's suggestions, and Imani's last name in turn changes since she is their descendant.

In an interlude in 2062, Fia frequently visits the painting of herself in Imani's art gallery, feeling comforted by the legacy of her actions. Meanwhile, Nozzo tells Fia that her mentor Duffy was killed in an accident during time travel. While Nozzo offers to let Fia take time off to cope with his loss, Fia follows the advice that Duffy had given her to focus on the job.

=== Chapter Four: Clock Blocked ===
A startup company was run by lead engineer Benji Pasamon and marketing director Maddison Bates, assisted by office manager Cassie. On a critical day in 2042, Bates led a presentation to investors and secured significant financial backing. Recognized as the leader, she took control of the company, which became a multinational corporation. Pasamon instructs Fia to change history so he gives the presentation and becomes the company's leader, which she successfully does.

To the surprise of Fia and Nozzo, ChronoZen's next client is Bates, who is unaware of Fia's previous time travel. She instructs Fia to make it so that both her and Pasamon jointly give the presentation. Even though the mission is dangerous because it is fatal for a time traveler to encounter herself, Fia agrees because Duffy had done the feat once before. Fia successfully completes the mission and returns to Imani's art gallery, only to be horrified that history has been altered by unrelated time travel by another ChronoZen agent and both Imani and the painting Paula Inman made of her as an angel no longer exist.

Also unaware of Fia's previous activities, office manager Cassie hires ChronoZen to have herself give the presentation instead of Pasamon or Bates. Completing a mission with two alternate versions of an agent present is unprecedented, but Fia recklessly agrees to accept it to build a legacy by being recognized for doing something previously thought impossible. She is successful, but when Fia returns to 2062, Pasamon and Bates reveal that they have residual memories of when they were in charge and they kill Fia and Nozzo. By using the emergency rewind protocol to repeat events and take actions in the past, Fia successfully defuses the situation.

=== Chapter Five: Time Eleven ===
Hanna Tanaka tasks Fia with preventing a murder on the early hours of September 11, 2001, which went unsolved due to the chaos of the September 11 attacks until the murderer confessed decades later. The pair travel to the day before and capture the murderer, only to find in the historical archives that when he failed to do the job, someone else took over and the murder still took place.

Investigating the identity of the new murderer leads Fia to visit the World Trade Center the day before its destruction, where she meets a younger version of Imani, and learns that she will die during the attacks. Fia discovers that Hanna was a corrupt cop and that the murder was a cover-up to prevent her friend from revealing this. Upset that she lied about her motives, Fia decides to send Hanna back to 2062, but Hanna prevents this by assaulting a police officer and getting arrested. Fia time travels to two months later to the day when she would be released, but finds Hanna has vanished as a result of a temporal paradox.

Fia learns that after the original murderer failed to do the job, the younger Hanna was assigned to the murder, but then she was killed in self-defense by Imani. After Fia prevents the deaths of both, the older Hanna reappears after escaping from jail. Having both her original memories and new memories of the pathetic lifetime she will live after her younger self was revealed to be a corrupt cop, Hanna attempts to kill her younger self, which the player can choose to have Fia either prevent or allow to happen.

Fia becomes romantically involved with Imani and prevents her from going to her office at the World Trade Center the morning of September 11. Fia returns to 2062 and hopes that saving Imani's life will mean the art gallery and Paula's painting of her will be restored, but learns that Imani died in 2029 in an explosion that also destroyed the painting.

=== Chapter Six: Pastroland ===
The son of renowned horror novelist Otis Knox hires ChronoZen to investigate the night that his father disappeared near Astroland in 1993. Her search leads to the home of the man who married Knox's wife after his disappearance, and she is shocked to find a device used for time travel, proving that the man who would marry Knox's wife is a rogue time traveler.

Following a lead that Knox behaved differently after a certain night in 1977, Fia travels to that year and finds the dead body of Otis Knox and deduces that the rogue time traveler took over his identity. Fia confronts Otis Knox in 1993 who reveals that he is actually Duffy, Fia's mentor at ChronoZen whom she thought had died in an accident. He had met Knox's wife while on a mission and when the real Otis Knox tried to assault her, he killed Otis Knox in self-defense. Duffy then faked his own death and took over the life of Otis Knox so he could live in the past without the involvement of ChronoZen. He finds this life more satisfying than the one he had as an agent where anything and anyone he cares about could potentially be erased from existence.

Fia cannot kill Duffy or otherwise manipulate historical events due to Otis Knox and his novels being so influential to history. Her plan is to wait until after history says Otis Knox was last seen, then force him to return to ChronoZen, but Duffy covertly poisons Fia and kills her, trapping her in a time loop due to the emergency rewind protocol. Duffy tells her she'll have to return to the future to receive the cure, at which point he will have fled. Nonetheless, Fia manages to create a cure by traveling between 1977 and 1993. Fia confronts Duffy and prepares to kill him, but he uses a device he invented to prevent Nozzo in 2062 from being able to observe events in the past. Duffy tells her that he can help her escape her life with ChronoZen as he did. Fia returns to the future, telling Nozzo that Duffy is dead.

In the epilogue, Nozzo discovers that Fia broke into ChronoZen and traveled to 2029 to stop the explosion that killed Imani and destroyed Paula Inman's painting of her. Nozzo follows and finds Fia mortally wounded and unable to be saved by the emergency rewind protocol. Nozzo deactivates the emergency rewind protocol and leaves her to die. In 2062, he visits Imani at her art gallery, which features the painting of Fia as an angel. Imani reveals to Nozzo that Fia faked her death and the two spent a happy lifetime together.

== Development ==
The game began development in 2020 during the COVID-19 pandemic. Creator Dave Gilbert worked for a year on a game with an initial plot where a catastrophic disaster occurs in Fia's present-day world and she must travel to various points in the past to discover how to stop it. Gilbert found this version of the game difficult to work on and eventually changed the focus from the world to the personal journey of Fia. Given that Wadjet Eye Games' previous title Unavowed became extremely successful in terms of sales and reviews, Dave Gilbert felt a paralyzing pressure for the next game to meet or succeed it. Eventually, he realized he had to let his next game be its own thing without worrying about its success in relation to other games. Sally Beaumont encouraged him to work on the early stages of the project as a game jam to help overcome this pressure. She contributed to the writing of what became Old Skies and recorded lines for the lead character Fia Quinn at various points over a three-year period.

The mechanic of the emergency rewind protocol provided an unexpected benefit in puzzle design by allowing for more out-of-the-box solutions akin to those in the Monkey Island series while still preserving a sense of fairness for how the player solves them through trial-and-error.

Dave Gilbert has lived most of his life in New York City and personally viewed the World Trade Center burning on September 11, 2001. He decided not to portray the event itself in Chapter 5, instead only showing events the day before and two months after. Several of the characters' experiences reflect his own, such as one who says, "It looked like giant, flaming cigarettes," which is what Gilbert thought when he first saw them. He found the point of view of Fia as a time traveler to be interesting as she had a detached view of the event the same way a modern gamer might be detached from the Hindenburg disaster or the sinking of the Titanic, and that this allowed him to avoid making any political statement.

== Reception ==
Reception

Aggregate score
Aggregator	Score
Metacritic	(PC) 80/100 (NS) 75/100

Review scores
Publication	Score
Eurogamer	4/5
GameSpot	8/10
Nintendo Life	7/10
PC Gamer (US)	87/100

Awards
Publication	Award
Adventure Game Hotspot	Best Story (2025)
Adventure Game Hotspot	Best Sci-fi (2025)
PC Gamer	Best Adventure Game (2025)

Old Skies received a score of 80/100 for PC and 75/100 for Nintendo Switch on review aggregator Metacritic, indicating generally favorable reviews by critics.

Reviewers praised the story and the character of Fia Quinn, particularly her struggle with fatalism and being unable to form relationships or have a satisfying life due to people and places being able to be removed from history at any moment. Kotaku called the game "a boldly ambitious, constantly inventive piece of masterful storytelling." Entertainium wrote that "Old Skies is without a doubt one of Gilbert's most personable works as it touches upon themes that are not only dear to him as a writer, but to others, especially Americans, who end up playing this." Gamespot praised the story and observed that the consistent setting of New York City throughout various time periods meant that the game made the city "almost as yet another coworker immune to the full ramifications of time travel."

Puzzles received a generally positive reception. PC Gamer wrote that "the puzzles are fun rather than challenging" and "I might not feel like a genius for solving them, but they're still clever and fulfilling." However, there were some complaints over the time loop puzzles becoming tedious. Eurogamer criticized them saying, "they can feel a bit of a chore," but concluded that they were "only a minor blemish on an otherwise strong game." Gamespot felt that the trial and error gameplay, especially in the latter half of the game, "frustratingly slows the cadence of the story, which is the best part of Old Skies." Nintendo Life also felt that Fia's technology for generating period-appropriate currency was underused.

The game's art style by Ben Chandler was seen as a positive improvement over the pixel art of previous games from Wadjet Eye Games. The AV Club wrote that the higher resolution was "absolutely vital for the game's character work: Ben Chandler's animations give Fia and her friends a life and personality that a more simplified style couldn't capture." Vice praised the backgrounds but felt that the character designs "ends up looking slightly dated and less immersive."

The voice acting was praised, especially that of protagonist Fia Quinn. PC Gamer wrote, "Sally Beaumont's understated performance is uncomfortably real—you can feel Fia's composure and experience as she tries to move on, but also her weariness, and the cracks snaking across the surface of the walls she's been maintaining for all these years." The music by Thomas Regin, who also composed the score for Unavowed, was described as "leisurely" and reviewed positively.

The chapter set around the events of the September 11 attacks was praised. Kotaku wrote that "The 9/11 chapter is even more striking because the time it's set in is so central to the story it's telling, let alone because this is territory that gaming has otherwise not dared to tread." Nintendo Life wrote, "It's a particularly touching segment about what can and cannot be altered, deftly handled with respect and awareness of its emotional weight."

PC Gamer awarded Old Skies "Best Adventure Game" for their 2025 Game of the Year Awards. In Adventure Game Hotspot's 2025 Adventure Game Hotshot Awards, it received six nominations, winning in the categories of "Best Story" and "Best Sci-fi". Gamespot selected it as one of ten games on their list of "The Best PC Games Of 2025." Sally Beaumont was also selected as part of the 2025 BAFTA Breakthrough UK cohort for her role as lead voice actor, narrative & script consultant, and additional writing.

== See also ==
- Killing of Henryk Siwiak, a murder that occurred in New York City on September 11, 2001, a few hours after the 9/11 terrorist attacks. The investigation of the murder was hindered by the attacks that day and remains unsolved as of 2026.
