= Nebula Award for Best Poetry =

Science fiction and fantasy literary award

- Awarded for: A science fiction or fantasy poem of any length
- Presented by: Science Fiction and Fantasy Writers Association
- First award: 2026
- Currently held by: Jennifer Hudak (The World To Come)
- Website: nebulas.sfwa.org

The Nebula Award for Best Poetry is given each year by the Science Fiction and Fantasy Writers Association (SFWA) for science fiction or fantasy poetry. To be eligible for Nebula Award consideration, a poem must be published in English in the United States. Works published in English elsewhere in the world are also eligible, provided they are released on either a website or in an electronic edition. The inaugural poetry award, for works created in 2025, was awarded in 2026. The Nebula Awards have been described as one of "the most important of the American science fiction awards" and "the science-fiction and fantasy equivalent" of the Emmy Awards.

Nebula Award nominees and winners are selected by members of SFWA, although the authors of the nominees are not required to be members themselves. Each year, works are nominated by SFWA members during a period typically spanning from December 15 to January 31. The six works receiving the most nominations proceed to the final ballot, with additional nominees considered in the event of ties. Subsequently, members have about a month to vote on the final ballot, and the winners are announced at the Nebula Awards ceremony held in May. Authors are not permitted to nominate their own works, and ties in the final vote are broken, if possible, by the number of nominations the works received.

The inaugural award was given to Jennifer Hudak, for "The World To Come".

== Winners and nominees ==
SFWA currently identifies the awards by the year of publication, that is, the year prior to the year in which the award is given. Entries with a yellow background and an asterisk (*) next to the writer's name have won the award; the other entries are the other nominees on the shortlist.

* Winners and joint winners

Winners and nominees
Year	Author	Poem	Publisher or publication	Ref.
2025	Jennifer Hudak*	"The World To Come"	Strange Horizons	
2025	Linda D. Addison	"Though You Always Are"	Everything Endless (Raw Dog Screaming Press)	
2025	Jamal Hodge	"Though You Always Are"	Everything Endless (Raw Dog Screaming Press)	
2025	Casey Aimer	"They Said Robots Are"	Penumbric	
2025	Angela Liu	"The Mourning Robot"	Uncanny Magazine	
2025	Mari Ness	"Care for Lightning"	Uncanny Magazine	
2025	Nico Martinez Nocito	"To Be the Change"	Strange Horizons	

== See also ==
- Rhysling Award
- Dwarf Stars Award
