= Hugo Award for Best Poem =

Annual awards for science fiction or fantasy

- Awarded for: The best science fiction or fantasy poem published in the prior calendar year
- Presented by: World Science Fiction Society
- First award: 2025
- Most recent winner: Elis Montgomery ("Hex Supply Customer Support Log")
- Website: thehugoawards.org

The Hugo Award for Best Poem is one of the Hugo Awards given each year for science fiction or fantasy poems published or translated into English during the previous calendar year. The Hugo Awards have been described as "a fine showcase for speculative fiction" and "the best known literary award for science fiction writing". The Hugo Award for Best Poem has been awarded annually since 2025. It was first presented in that year as a one-time special Hugo Award in advance of a proposal to make it a permanent category; it was presented again in 2026 as a special Hugo Award, and was ratified as a permanent category by members of the World Science Fiction Society that year.

Hugo Award nominees and winners are chosen by supporting or attending members of the annual World Science Fiction Convention, or Worldcon, and the presentation evening constitutes its central event. The selection process is defined in the World Science Fiction Society Constitution as instant-runoff voting with six finalists. The series on the ballot are the six most-nominated by members that year, with no limit on the number of series that can be nominated. Initial nominations of five series each are made by members in January through March, while voting on the ballot of six finalists is performed roughly in April through July, subject to change depending on when that year's Worldcon is held. Worldcons are generally held near the start of September, and are held in a different city around the world each year.

In the two nomination years, 12 poems by 10 poets have been finalists, and two poems by two different poets have won. Marie Brennan won the first year, and Elis Montgomery the second.

== Winners and finalists ==
In the following table, the years correspond to the date of the ceremony, rather than when the poem was first published. Each year links to the corresponding "year in literature" article. Entries with a yellow background have won the award; those with a grey background are the finalists on the short-list. If the poem was originally published in a book with other stories rather than by itself or in a magazine, the book title is included before the publisher's name.

* Winners and joint winners + No winner selected

Winners and finalists
Year	Author(s)	Poem	Publisher or publication	Ref.
2025	Marie Brennan*	"A War of Words"	Strange Horizons	
2025	Oliver K. Langmead	Calypso	Titan Books	
2025	Mari Ness	"Ever Noir"	Haven Spec Magazine	
2025	Angela Liu	"there are no taxis for the dead"	Uncanny Magazine	
2025	Ai Jiang	"We Drink Lava"	Uncanny Magazine	
2025	Devan Barlow	"Your Visiting Dragon"	Strange Horizons	
2026	Elis Montgomery*	"Hex Supply Customer Support Log"	Strange Horizons	
2026	Mari Ness	"Care for Lightning"	Uncanny Magazine	
2026	Theodora Goss	"How to Become a Sea Witch"	The Orange & Bee	
2026	Brandon O'Brien	"Landing: Seattle"	Seattle Worldcon 2025 Opening Ceremony	
2026	Angela Liu	"The Mourning Robot"	Uncanny Magazine	
2026	Jennifer Hudak	"The World to Come"	Strange Horizons	
