= Naomi Kritzer =

American writer

- Born: North Carolina
- Education: Carleton College
- Occupation: Novelist
- Writing career
- Language: English
- Genres: Science fiction, fantasy
- Notable awards: Hugo–Short Story (2016, 2024); Locus–Short Story (2016); Locus–Short Story (2021); Lodestar Award (2020); Nebula–Novelette (2024); Hugo–Novelette (2024, 2025)
- Website: naomikritzer.com

Naomi Kritzer is an American speculative fiction writer and blogger. Her 2015 short story "Cat Pictures Please" was a Locus Award and Hugo Award winner and was nominated for a Nebula Award. Her novel Catfishing on CatNet won the 2020 Lodestar Award for Best Young Adult Book.

== Biography ==
Kritzer has lived in London and Nepal. She attended Wingra School (an independent school) in Madison, Wisconsin (1978–1986); Highgate Wood Secondary School in Haringey, England (1986–1987); Madison West High School (1987–1991); and Carleton College of Northfield, Minnesota (1991–1995). As of 2020, she lives in Saint Paul, Minnesota, and blogs on local elections.

== Career ==
Since 1999 Kritzer has published a number of short stories and several novels, including two trilogies for Bantam Books, and her Seastead series of short stories for The Magazine of Fantasy & Science Fiction. Her 2015 short story "Cat Pictures Please" published in Clarkesworld Magazine was a Locus Award and Hugo Award winner and was nominated for a Nebula Award.

== Awards ==
Year	Title/Work	Award	Category	Result	Ref
2003	Fires of the Faithful	Crawford Award	—	Shortlisted	
2003	Fires of the Faithful	Locus Award	First Novel	Nominated–8th	
2013	"Liberty's Daughter"	Locus Award	Novelette	Nominated–20th	
2014	"Bits"	WSFA Small Press Award	—	Nominated	
2014	"The Wall"	Asimov's Reader Poll	Short Story	Won (tie)	
2016	"Cat Pictures Please"	Hugo Award	Short Story	Won	
2016	"Cat Pictures Please"	Nebula Award	Short Story	Shortlisted	
2016	"Cat Pictures Please"	Locus Award	Short Story	Won–1st	
2016	"Cat Pictures Please"	WSFA Small Press Award	—	Nominated	
2018	Cat Pictures Please and Other Stories	Locus Award	Collection	Nominated–7th	
2019	"The Thing About Ghost Stories"	Hugo Award	Novelette	Shortlisted	
2020	Catfishing on CatNet	Dragon Awards	YA Novel	Shortlisted	
2020	Catfishing on CatNet	Nebula Award	Andre Norton Award	Shortlisted	
2020	Catfishing on CatNet	Edgar Awards	Young Adult	Won	
2020	Catfishing on CatNet	Locus Award	Young Adult	Nominated–2nd	
2020	Catfishing on CatNet	Lodestar Award	—	Won	
2021	"Monster"	Hugo Award	Novelette	Shortlisted	
2021	"Little Free Library"	Hugo Award	Short Story	Shortlisted	
2021	"Little Free Library"	Locus Award	Short Story	Won–1st	
2022	Chaos on CatNet	Locus Award	Young Adult	Nominated–2nd	
2022	Chaos on CatNet	Lodestar Award	—	Shortlisted	
2023	"The Dragon Project"	WSFA Small Press Award	—	Won	
2024	"Better Living Through Algorithms"	Hugo Award	Short Story	Won	
2024	"Better Living Through Algorithms"	Nebula Award	Short Story	Shortlisted	
2024	Liberty's Daughter	Lodestar Award	—	Shortlisted	
2024	Liberty's Daughter	Minnesota Book Award	Genre Fiction	Nominated	
2024	Liberty's Daughter	Nebula Award	Andre Norton Award	Shortlisted	
2024	"The Year Without Sunshine"	Eugie Award	—	Shortlisted	
2024	"The Year Without Sunshine"	Hugo Award	Novelette	Won	
2024	"The Year Without Sunshine"	Locus Award	Novelette	Nominated–3rd	
2024	"The Year Without Sunshine"	Nebula Award	Novelette	Won	
2024	"The Year Without Sunshine"	Theodore Sturgeon Award	—	Shortlisted	
2025	"The Four Sisters Overlooking the Sea"	Hugo Award	Novelette	Won	

== Bibliography ==
=== Novel series ===
==== Eliana's Song ====
- —— (2002). Fires of the Faithful (paperback 1st ed.). Spectra Books. pp. 1–373. ISBN 9780553585179.
- —— (2003). Turning the Storm (paperback 1st ed.). Spectra. pp. 1–369. ISBN 9780553585506.
- Story:
  - "Kin" (2004)

==== Dead Rivers ====
- —— (2004). Freedom's Gate (paperback 1st ed.). Spectra Books. pp. 1–384. ISBN 9780553586732.
- —— (2005). Freedom's Apprentice (paperback 1st ed.). Spectra Books. pp. 1–384. ISBN 9780553586749.
- —— (2006). Freedom's Sisters (paperback 1st ed.). Spectra. pp. 1–416. ISBN 9780553586756.

==== CatNet ====
- —— (2019). Catfishing on CatNet (hardcover 1st ed.). Tor Teen. pp. 1–304. ISBN 9781250165084.
- —— (2021). Chaos on Catnet (hardcover 1st ed.). Tor Teen. pp. 1–304. ISBN 9781250165220.

=== Standalone novels ===
- —— (2023). Liberty's Daughter (1st ed.). Fairwood Press. ISBN 9781958880166.

=== Collections ===
- —— (2011). Comrade Grandmother and Other Stories (kindle ed.). pp. 1–166. ASIN B004ZW99BU.
- —— (2011). Gift of the Winter King and Other Stories (kindle ed.). pp. 1–195. ASIN B004WPPA7C. (2011)
- —— (2017). Cat Pictures Please and Other Stories (paperback 1st ed.). Fairwood Press. pp. 1–315. ISBN 9781933846675.

=== Short fiction ===
Year	Title	First published	Reprinted/collected
1999	"Faust's SASE"		Comrade Grandmother and Other Stories
2000	"Gift of the Winter King"		Gift of the Winter King and Other Stories
2000	"The Golem"		Comrade Grandmother and Other Stories, Cat Pictures Please and Other Stories
2000	"The Price"		Gift of the Winter King and Other Stories
2000	"Spirit Stone"		Comrade Grandmother and Other Stories
2002	"Comrade Grandmother"		Comrade Grandmother and Other Stories, Cat Pictures Please and Other Stories
2002	"In the Witch's Garden"		Gift of the Winter King and Other Stories, Cat Pictures Please and Other Stories
2004	"St. Ailbe's Hall"		Gift of the Winter King and Other Stories
2004	"Kin"	"Kin". Marion Zimmer Bradley's Sword And Sorceress. No. XXI. November 2004.	Gift of the Winter King and Other Stories
2005	"The Long Walk" (with Lyda Morehouse)		Comrade Grandmother and Other Stories
2007	"Honest Man"		Comrade Grandmother and Other Stories, Cat Pictures Please and Other Stories
2008	"When Shlemiel Went to the Stars"		Comrade Grandmother and Other Stories
2009	"The Good Son"		Comrade Grandmother and Other Stories, Lightspeed, March 2015, Cat Pictures Please and Other Stories
2011	"Brother Mac, You Are Healed!"	Gift of the Winter King and Other Stories. April 2011.	
2011	"Magefire"	Gift of the Winter King and Other Stories. April 2011.	
2011	"Masks"	Gift of the Winter King and Other Stories. April 2011.	
2011	"Darknight"	Gift of the Winter King and Other Stories. April 2011.	
2011	"The Manual"	Gift of the Winter King and Other Stories. April 2011.	
2011	"Kitchen Magic, With Recipes"	Gift of the Winter King and Other Stories. April 2011.	
2011	"Fortune"	Comrade Grandmother and Other Stories. May 2011.	
2011	"Three Wishes"	Comrade Grandmother and Other Stories. May 2011.	
2011	"Unreal Estate"	Comrade Grandmother and Other Stories. May 2011.	
2011	"Isabella's Garden"	Kritzer, Naomi (August 2011). "Isabella's Garden". Realms of Fantasy. No. 101.	Cat Pictures Please and Other Stories
2011	"What Happened at Blessing Creek"	Kritzer, Naomi (August 2011). "What Happened at Blessing Creek". Intergalactic Medicine Show. No. 24.	Cat Pictures Please and Other Stories
2012	"Scrap Dragon"	Kritzer, Naomi (January–February 2012). "Scrap Dragon". The Magazine of Fantasy and Science Fiction. No. 122.	The Year's Best Fantasy and Science Fiction: 2013 Edition, Cat Pictures Please and Other Stories
2013	"Bits"	Kritzer, Naomi (October 2013). "Bits". Clarkesworld. No. 85.	Cat Pictures Please and Other Stories
2013	"The Wall"	Kritzer, Naomi (April–May 2013). "The Wall". Asimov's Science Fiction. 37 (4&5): 97–107.	Cat Pictures Please and Other Stories
2014	"Artifice"	Kritzer, Naomi (September 2014). "Artifice". Analog Science Fiction and Fact. 134 (9): 48–54.	ESLI, October 2015 (Russian translation), Cat Pictures Please and Other Stories
2015	"Cat Pictures Please"	Kritzer, Naomi (January 2015). "Cat Pictures Please". Clarkesworld. No. 100.	Cat Pictures Please and Other Stories
2015	"So Much Cooking"	Kritzer, Naomi (November 2015). "So Much Cooking". Clarkesworld. No. 110.	Cat Pictures Please and Other Stories
2015	"Cleanout"	Kritzer, Naomi (November–December 2015). "Cleanout". The Magazine of Fantasy and Science Fiction. No. 129.	Cat Pictures Please and Other Stories
2015	"Wind"	Kritzer, Naomi (April 2015). "Wind". Apex. No. 71.	Cat Pictures Please and Other Stories
2016	"Zombies in Winter"	Kritzer, Naomi (December 2016). "Zombies in Winter". Persistent Visions.	
2017	"Waiting Out the End of the World in Patty's Place Cafe"	Kritzer, Naomi (March 2017). "Waiting Out the End of the World in Patty's Place Cafe". Clarkesworld. No. 126.	The Year's Best Science Fiction: Thirty-Fifth Annual Collection, The Long List Anthology: Volume 4
2017	"Ace of Spades"	Cat Pictures Please and Other Stories. Fairwood Press. April 2017. ISBN 9781933846675.	
2017	"Perfection"	Cat Pictures Please and Other Stories. Fairwood Press. April 2017. ISBN 9781933846675.	
2017	"Paradox"	Kritzer, Naomi (May 2017). "Paradox". Uncanny. No. 16.	
2017	"Evil Opposite"	Kritzer, Naomi (September 2017). "Evil Opposite". The Magazine of Fantasy and Science Fiction. No. 133.	
2018	"Field Biology of the Wee Fairies"	Kritzer, Naomi (September 2018). "Field Biology of the Wee Fairies". Apex. No. 112.	The Best Science Fiction & Fantasy of the Year: Volume Thirteen, The Long List Anthology: Volume 5
2018	"Prophet of Roads"	Infinity's End. Solaris. July 2018. ISBN 9781781085752.	The Best Science Fiction of the Year: Volume 4
2018	"The Thing About Ghost Stories"	Kritzer, Naomi (November 2018). "The Thing About Ghost Stories". Uncanny. No. 25.	The Year's Best Dark Fantasy & Horror: 2019
2020	"A Star Without Shine"	Kritzer, Naomi (May 2020). "A Star Without Shine". Decameron Project.	
2020	"Little Free Library"	Kritzer, Naomi (April 2020). "Little Free Library". Tor.com.	
2020	"Monster"	Kritzer, Naomi (January 2020). "Monster". Clarkesworld. No. 160.	
2022	"The Dragon Project"	Kritzer, Naomi (March 2022). "The Dragon Project". Clarkesworld. No. 186.	
2022	"The Shape of the Particle"	The Reinvented Heart. CAEZIK SF & Fantasy. March 2022. ISBN 9781-64710-042-1.	
2023	"Better Living Through Algorithms"	Kritzer, Naomi (May 2023). "Better Living Through Algorithms". Clarkesworld. No. 200.	
2023	"The Year Without Sunshine"	Kritzer, Naomi (November 2023). "The Year Without Sunshine". Uncanny. No. 55.	
2024	"The Four Sisters Overlooking the Sea"	Kritzer, Naomi (September–October 2024). "The Four Sisters Overlooking the Sea". Asimov's Science Fiction. 49 (9&10).	The Year's Top Hard Science Fiction Stories 9
