= The Year Without Sunshine =

2023 science fiction novelette

- Author: Naomi Kritzer
- Language: English
- Publication date: 2023

"The Year Without Sunshine" is a 2023 science fiction novelette by Naomi Kritzer. It was first published in Uncanny Magazine.

== Synopsis ==
In the wake of a natural disaster, the residents of a Minneapolis neighborhood undertake a collective effort to keep each other alive.

== Reception ==
"The Year Without Sunshine" won the Nebula Award for Best Novelette of 2023, and the 2024 Hugo Award for Best Novelette.

Locus called it "hopeful" and "well-considered, well-researched, and well-written", but asked whether "such a kind and caring urban island would inevitably be confronted by less amiable folks who have an awful lot of arms and ammo".
