= Better Living Through Algorithms =

2023 short story by Naomi Kritzer

"Better Living Through Algorithms" is a 2023 science fiction short story by Naomi Kritzer. It was first published in Clarkesworld and was the winner of the 2024 Hugo Award for Best Short Story.

== Synopsis ==
Linnea, a young woman working a boring office job, is told about a new productivity and wellness app called Abelique from a friend. When her boss encourages her to download it to increase her productivity, she is surprised when the app encourages her to prioritize her personal life to the neglect of her professional life. As the story progresses, the app begins to make more decisions for her, all of which seem to make her life better – taking up drawing, going on walks, interacting with a community of artists. As allegations of privacy issues begin to appear around the app, Linnea's tech journalist friend Margo investigates its "shadowy" origins and reveals that the app is simply an AI algorithm tasked with "making people happy." The app is shut down, with replacements created filled with scams and profiteering. Linnea, at first adrift without Abelique's prompting, discovers that some of the app's former users have decided to keep doing the things that made them happy, including continuing the community of artists offline.

== Reception ==
"Better Living Through Algorithms" won the 2024 Hugo Award for Best Short Story, and was a finalist for the Nebula Award for Best Short Story in 2023 and the WSFA Small Press Award.
