= Nebula Award for Best Comics =

Science fiction and fantasy literary award

- Awarded for: Science fiction or fantasy comics
- Presented by: Science Fiction and Fantasy Writers Association
- First award: 2025
- Currently held by: Jessica Maison (Mary Shelley’s School for Monsters: The Killing Stone)
- Website: nebulas.sfwa.org

The Nebula Award for Best Comics is given each year by the Science Fiction and Fantasy Writers Association (SFWA) for science fiction or fantasy comics. To be eligible for Nebula Award consideration, a comic must be published in English in the United States. Works published in English elsewhere in the world are also eligible, provided they are released on either a website or in an electronic edition. The award is only given to the authors of the comic, not the artists. The inaugural comics award, for works created in 2025, was awarded in 2026. The Nebula Awards have been described as one of "the most important of the American science fiction awards" and "the science-fiction and fantasy equivalent" of the Emmy Awards.

Nebula Award nominees and winners are selected by members of SFWA, although the authors of the nominees are not required to be members themselves. Each year, works are nominated by SFWA members during a period typically spanning from December 15 to January 31. The six works receiving the most nominations proceed to the final ballot, with additional nominees considered in the event of ties. Subsequently, members have about a month to vote on the final ballot, and the winners are announced at the Nebula Awards ceremony held in May. Authors are not permitted to nominate their own works, and ties in the final vote are broken, if possible, by the number of nominations the works received.

The inaugural year was won by Jessica Maison for Mary Shelley's School for Monsters: The Killing Stone.

== Winners and nominees ==
SFWA currently identifies the awards by the year of publication, that is, the year prior to the year in which the award is given. Entries with a yellow background and an asterisk (*) next to the writer's name have won the award; the other entries are the other nominees on the shortlist.

* Winners and joint winners

Winners and nominees
Year	Author	Work	Publisher or publication	Ref.
2025	Jessica Maison*	Mary Shelley's School for Monsters: The Killing Stone	Wicked Tree	
2025	Kit Anderson	Second Shift	Avery Hill	
2025	Amy Chu	Carmilla Volume 3: The Eternal	Berger Books	
2025	Tom King	Helen of Wyndhorn	Dark Horse Comics	
2025	Jeff Lemire	Fishflies	Image Comics	
2025	Ariel Slamet Ries	Strange Bedfellows	HarperAlley	
2025	Jason Walz	The Flip Side	Rocky Pond	
2025	G. Willow Wilson	The Stoneshore Register	Berger Books	

== See also ==
- Eisner Awards
- Hugo Award for Best Graphic Story or Comic
