= Esther MacCallum-Stewart =

British author and academic

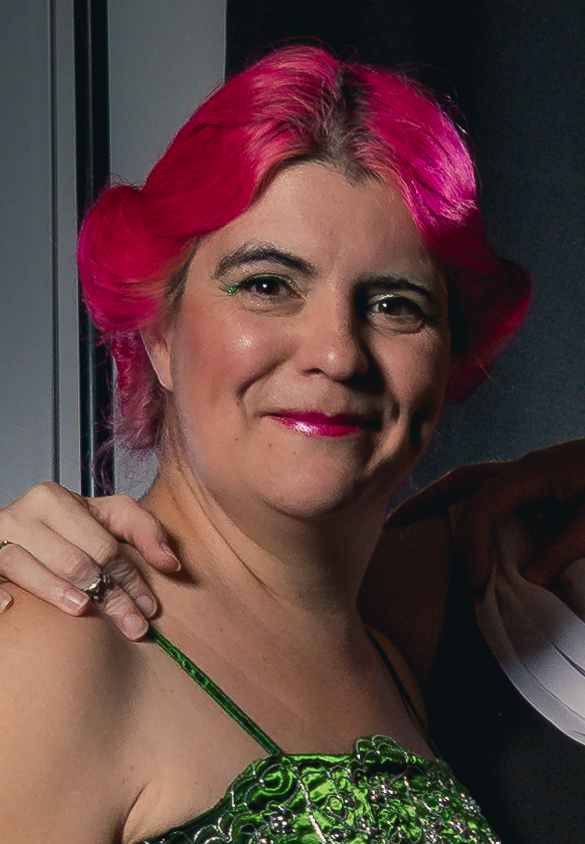
- Portrait photoshoot at Worldcon 75, Helsinki
- Education: Ph.D
- Alma mater: University of Sussex
- Known for: Gaming
- Website: https://www.staffs.ac.uk/people/esther-maccallum-stewart

Esther MacCallum-Stewart is a British author and academic on games and sex, sexuality and gender in gaming as well as on the narrative of games.

== Biography ==
Esther MacCallum-Stewart attended the University of Sussex where she completed her degrees from BA to doctorate. Though her doctorate thesis was on Popular Culture and the First World War MacCallum-Stewart has gone on to become Professor of Game Studies at the University of Staffordshire. MacCallum-Stewart researches how narratives in games are understood by the player as well as publishing articles on sex, sexuality, and gender in games. MacCallum-Stewart works across the whole area of gaming including boardgaming, role-playing, MMOs and casual gaming. MacCallum-Stewart has written a number of books on the subject and co-written books and had chapters included. She has also written a number of papers on the subject. She was nominated in 2017 for Hugo Award for Best Fanzine for Journey Planet.

MacCallum-Stewart is currently the chair of British DiGRA and was responsible for hosting the BDiGRA 2018 conference. She is also heavily involved in science fiction and fantasy fan communities. MacCallum-Stewart was responsible for the games program and events of the Worldcon in London in 2014, division head of facilitation for the Worldcon in Dublin 2019 and deputy division head for facilities for Worldcon in New Zealand 2020. She was the chair of the 2024 Worldcon in Glasgow.

== Bibliography ==
=== Books ===
- Ring-Bearers – Lord of the Rings Online as Intertextual Narrative, 2011
- Game Love: Essays on Play and Affection, 2014
- Routledge Studies in New Media and Cyberculture: Online Games, Social Narratives, 2014
- Gender and Sexuality in Contemporary Popular Fantasy: Beyond boy wizards and kick-ass chicks, 2016
- The Science Fiction of Iain M. Banks, 2018
- Rerolling Boardgames: Essays on Themes, Systems, Experiences and Ideologies (Studies in Gaming), due 2020

==== Chapters ====
- The Routledge Companion to Science Fiction. Chapter: Digital Games (with Tanya Kryzwinska).
- Theater of War (with Meredith Davenport)- Chapter: "A Master's degree in Shooting Stuff"
- Dungeons and Dragons and Philosophy. (Chapter) ‘Oh God! Kill Her, Kill Her; I'm Sorry!!!’
- 1001 Books You Must Read Before You Die (2012)
- The Gender and Media Reader Routledge -Chapter :‘Real Men Carry Girly Epics – Normalising Gender Bending in Online Games
- The Edinburgh Companion to British and American Twentieth Century War Literature (ed. Piette and Rawlinson) -Chapter:‘Play up and Play the Game!’ – The Narrative of War Games.’
- Online Gaming in Context: The Social and Cultural Significance of Online Games - Chapter: ‘Conflict, Thought Communities and Textual Appropriation in MMORPGs’
