= Ray Nayler =

American and Canadian writer

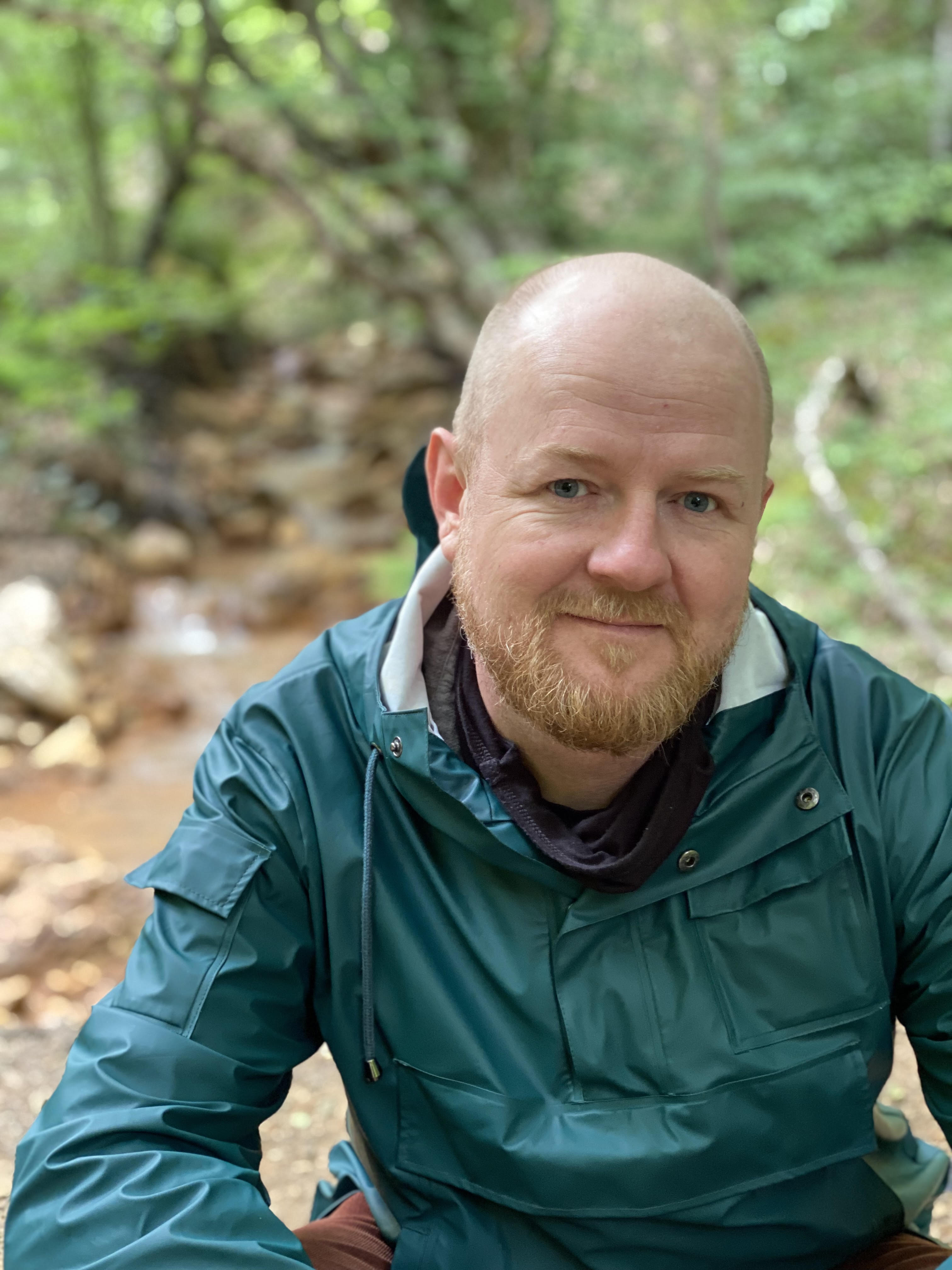
- Born: Quebec, Canada
- Education: University of California, Santa Cruz (BA); SOAS University of London (MA); University of Essex (PhD)
- Website: www.raynayler.net

Ray Nayler is an American and Canadian writer whose works engage with ecology, systems theory, and questions of consciousness and intelligence, including animal and artificial intelligence.

== Career ==
Nayler's debut novel, The Mountain in the Sea, focuses on the discovery of a society of intelligent octopuses off the coast of Vietnam, and was the winner of the 2023 Locus Award for Best First Novel as well as being a finalist for the Nebula Award and the Los Angeles Times Ray Bradbury Award. It was declared one of the best Science Fiction novels of all time by Esquire.

Nayler's second book, the novella The Tusks of Extinction, centers on the de-extinction of the woolly mammoth and was published in 2024. It won the Hugo Award for Best Novella and was a finalist for the Nebula Award and the Locus Award

His third book, a "near-future thriller" titled Where the Axe Is Buried, was released on April 1, 2025 and tells the story of a rebellion against the status quo in a near future dominated by AI and authoritarian regimes. His fourth book, Palaces of the Crow, is a speculative novel of the recent past, in which four young teens caught between the Nazis and the Red Army survive winter in the woods with the help of a flock of highly intelligent crows. It was published May 19, 2026.

Nayler previously served in the Peace Corps and as a US Foreign Service officer, working in Russia, Central Asia, the Caucasus, and the Balkans. He was Press Attaché at the United States Embassy in Baku, Azerbaijan, and Environment, Science, Technology, and Health Officer at the U.S. consulate in Ho Chi Minh City. He was international advisor for the Marine Protected Areas Center at the National Oceanic and Atmospheric Administration (NOAA), and was a visiting scholar and diplomat in residence at George Washington University's Institute of International Science and Technology Policy and Space Policy Institute.

== Bibliography ==
=== Novels ===
- The Mountain in the Sea (2022)
- The Tusks of Extinction (2024) - winner of 2025 Hugo Award for Best Novella
- Where the Axe Is Buried (2025)
- Palaces of the Crow (2026)

=== Short stories ===
| Year | Title (Note: Short stories unless otherwise noted.) | First published | Reprinted/collected | Notes |
|---|---|---|---|---|
| 2015 | "Mutability" | Nayler, Ray (June 2015). "Mutability". Asimov's Science Fiction. 39 (6): 48–57. | | |
| 2016 | "Do Not Forget Me" | Nayler, Ray (March 2016). "Do Not Forget Me". Asimov's Science Fiction. 40 (3): 60–69. | | |
| 2019 | "Fire in the Bone" | Nayler, Ray (January 2019). "Fire in the Bone". Clarkesworld. Issue 148 | | Direct link |
| 2019 | "Beyond the High Altar" | Nayler, Ray (September 2019). "Beyond the High Altar". Nightmare. Issue 84 | | Direct link |
| 2019 | "The Death of Fire Station 10" | Nayler, Ray (October 2019). "The Death of Fire Station 10". Lightspeed. Issue 113 | | Direct link |
| 2020 | "Albedo Season" | Nayler, Ray (May 2020). "Albedo Season". Clarkesworld. Issue 164 | | Direct link |
| 2020 | "The Swallows of the Storm" | Nayler, Ray (July 2020). "The Swallows of the Storm". Lightspeed. Issue 122 | | Direct link |
| 2020 | "Outside of Omaha" | Nayler, Ray (September 2020). "Outside of Omaha". Nightmare. Issue 96 | | Direct link |
| 2021 | "Sarcophagus" | Nayler, Ray (April 2021). "Sarcophagus". Clarkesworld. Issue 175 | | Direct link |
| 2021 | "Yesterday's Wolf" | Nayler, Ray (September 2021). "Yesterday's Wolf". Clarkesworld. Issue 180 | | Direct link |
| 2022 | "The Summer Castle" | Nayler, Ray (February 2022). "The Summer Castle". Nightmare. Issue 113 | | Direct link |
| 2022 | "Rain of Days" | Nayler, Ray (March 2022). "Rain of Days". Clarkesworld. Issue 186 | | Direct link |
| 2023 | "The Job at the End of the World" | Nayler, Ray (August 30, 2023). "The Job at the End of the World: A Tor.com Original" Tor.com | | Google Play Books |
