= Nebula Award =

Literature prize for science fiction and fantasy works from the United States

- Nebula Award logo
- Awarded for: The best science fiction or fantasy works of the previous calendar year
- Presented by: Science Fiction and Fantasy Writers of America
- First award: 1966; 60 years ago
- Website: nebulas.sfwa.org

The Nebula Awards annually recognize the best works of science fiction or fantasy published in the United States. The awards are organized and awarded by the Science Fiction and Fantasy Writers Association (SFWA), a nonprofit association of professional science fiction and fantasy writers. They were first presented in 1966 and are awarded in four categories for literary works of different lengths. A fifth category for film and television episode scripts was given 1974–78 and 2000–09, and a sixth category for game writing was begun in 2018. In 2019 SFWA announced that two awards that were previously run under the same rules but not considered Nebula awards—the Andre Norton Award for Middle Grade and Young Adult Fiction and the Ray Bradbury Award for Outstanding Dramatic Presentation—were to be considered official Nebula awards. Awards for Comics and Poetry were added in 2026. The rules governing the Nebula Awards have changed several times during the awards' history, most recently in 2010. The SFWA Nebula Conference, at which the awards are announced and presented, is held each spring in the United States. Locations vary from year to year.

The Nebula Awards are one of the best known and most prestigious science fiction and fantasy awards and The Guardian called them "the most important of the American science fiction awards", together with the Hugo Awards. Winning works have been published in special collections, and winners and nominees are often noted as such on the books' covers. SFWA identifies the awards by the year of publication, that is, the year prior to the year in which the award is given.

For lists of winners and nominees for each Nebula category, see the list of categories below.

== Award ==
The Nebula Awards are given annually by the Science Fiction and Fantasy Writers of America (SFWA) for the best science fiction or fantasy fiction published during the previous year. To be eligible for consideration works must be published in English in the United States. Works published in English elsewhere in the world are also eligible provided they are released on either a website or in an electronic edition. The awards are not limited to American citizens or members of SFWA. Works translated into English are also eligible.

There are no written rules as to which works qualify as science fiction or fantasy, and the decision of eligibility in that regard is left up to the nominators and voters, rather than to SFWA.

The winner receives a trophy but no cash prize; the trophy is a transparent block with an embedded glitter spiral nebula and gemstones cut to resemble planets. The trophy itself was designed for the first awards by J. A. Lawrence, based on a sketch by Kate Wilhelm, and has remained the same ever since.

Nebula Award nominees and winners are chosen by members of the SFWA. Works are nominated each year between November 15 and February 15 by published authors who are members of the organization, with the six works that receive the most nominations forming the final ballot. Additional nominees are possible in the case of ties. Members then vote on the ballot throughout March, and the final results are presented at the Nebula Awards ceremony in May. Authors are not permitted to nominate their own works, though they can decline nominations. Ties in the final vote are broken, if possible, by the number of nominations the works received.

== History ==
Nebula Award for Best Novella for The Green Leopard Plague, by Walter Jon Williams

The first Nebulas were given in 1966, for works published in 1965. The idea for such an award, funded by the sales of anthologies collecting the winning works, was proposed by SFWA secretary-treasurer Lloyd Biggle, Jr. in 1965. The idea was based on the Edgar Awards, presented by the Mystery Writers of America, and the idea to have a ceremony at which to present them was prompted by the Edgar and Hugo Awards. The initial ceremony consisted of four literary awards, for Novels, Novellas, Novelettes, and Short Stories, which have been presented every year since. A Script award was also presented from 1974 to 1978 under the names Best Dramatic Presentation and Best Dramatic Writing and again from 2000 through 2009 as Best Script, but after 2009 it was again removed and replaced by SFWA with the Ray Bradbury Award. In 2018, a new Game Writing category was added, for writing in video and tabletop games. For the 2026 awards, two categories – Comics and Poetry – were added.

Prior to 2009, the Nebula Awards employed a rolling eligibility system. Each work was eligible to qualify for the ballot for one year following its date of publication. As a consequence of rolling eligibility, there was the possibility for works to be nominated in the calendar year after their publication and then be awarded in the calendar year after that. Works were added to a preliminary list for the year if they had ten or more nominations, which were then voted on to create the final ballot. In 1970, the option was added for voters to select "no award" if they felt that no nominated work was worthy of winning; this happened in 1971 in the Short Story category and in 1977 in the Script category.

Beginning in 1980 the eligibility year for nominations was set to the calendar year, rather than December–November as initially conceived, and the SFWA organizing panel was allowed to add an additional work. Authors were also allowed to use the mass-market paperback publication of their books as the beginning of their nomination period, rather than the initial hardback publication. As a consequence of the combination of this rule and the rolling eligibility, the 2007 awards, despite nominally being for works published in 2006, instead were all given to works initially published in 2005. Beginning with the 2010 awards, the rolling eligibility system and paperback publication exemption were replaced with the current rules.

== Categories ==
Categories
Categories	Years	Description
Best Novel	1966–present	Stories of 40,000 words or more
Best Novella	1966–present	Stories of between 17,500 and 40,000 words
Best Novelette	1966–present	Stories of between 7,500 and 17,500 words
Best Short Story	1966–present	Stories of less than 7,500 words
Best Script	1974–1978, 2000–2009	Movie or television episode scripts
Andre Norton Award	2006–present (promoted to official category in 2020)	Middle grade and young adult fiction
Ray Bradbury Award	2010–present (promoted to official category in 2020)	Dramatic presentations
Best Game Writing	2018–present	Writing in video and tabletop games
Best Comics	2026–present	Writing in comics
Best Poetry	2026–present	Writing in poetry

The Andre Norton Award for Outstanding Young Adult Science Fiction or Fantasy Book, inaugurated in 2006, and the Ray Bradbury Award for Outstanding Dramatic Presentation, replacing the Best Script award in 2010, were previously annual literary awards on the Nebula ballot but not considered full award categories. In 2020, both were added as official categories and their full names changed to be "Nebula Awards".

Beside the Nebulas, several other awards and honors are presented at the Nebula Awards ceremony. The others are the Damon Knight Memorial Grand Master Award (since 1975) for "lifetime achievement in science fiction and/or fantasy", the Author Emeritus (since 1995, not awarded since 2014) for contributions to the field, the Kevin O'Donnell, Jr. Award for service to SFWA, the Kate Wilhelm Solstice Award (since 2009) for significant impact on speculative fiction, and the Infinity Award (since 2023) as a posthumous equivalent to the Grand Master. All five are discretionary, but a Grand Master has been named every year but two since 1995. The Solstice Award may be presented posthumously (where only living writers may be named Grand Master or Author Emeritus).

== Recognition ==
The Nebula Awards have been described as one of "the most important of the American science fiction awards" and "the science-fiction and fantasy equivalent" of the Emmy Awards. Along with the Hugo Award, the Nebula Award is also considered one of the premier awards in science fiction, with Laura Miller of Salon terming it "science fiction's most prestigious award", and Justine Larbalestier, in The Battle of the Sexes in Science Fiction (2002), referring to it and the Hugo Award as "the best known and most prestigious of the science fiction awards". Brian Aldiss, in his book Trillion Year Spree: The History of Science Fiction, claimed that the Nebula Award provided "more literary judgment" while the Hugo was a barometer of reader popularity, rather than artistic merit, though he did note that the winners of the two awards often overlapped. David Langford and Peter Nicholls stated in The Encyclopedia of Science Fiction (2012) that the two awards were often given to the same works, and noted that some critics felt that the Nebula selection reflected "political as much as literary ability" as it did not seem to focus as much on literary talent over popularity as expected.

Several people within the publishing industry have said that winning or being nominated for a Nebula Award has effects on the author's career and the sales of that work. Spider Robinson in 1992, as quoted in Science Fiction Culture (2000), said that publishers "pay careful attention" to who wins a Nebula Award. Literary agent Richard Curtis said in his 1996 Mastering the Business of Writing that having the term Nebula Award on the cover, even as a nominee, was a "powerful inducement" to science fiction fans to buy a novel, and Gahan Wilson, in First World Fantasy Awards (1977), claimed that noting that a book had won the Nebula Award on the cover "demonstrably" increased sales for that novel.

== Annual collections ==
The Nebula Winners series, renamed the Nebula Awards Showcase series in 1999, is published annually by SFWA and edited by a variety of SFWA members. It was started in 1966 as a collection of short story winners and nominees for that year, and has continued every year since. The contents of each year's collection is at the discretion of its editor. The sales of these anthologies were intended to pay for presenting the awards themselves.

The anthology The Best of the Nebulas (1989), edited by Ben Bova, collected winners of Nebula awards from 1966 through 1986 officially selected by SFWA members. The unofficial anthology Nebula Award Winning Novellas (1994), edited by Martin H. Greenberg, contained ten stories which had won the novella award between 1970 and 1989.

== See also ==
- BSFA Award – British science fiction awards
- Hugo Award – Annual award for science fiction or fantasy
- List of joint winners of the Hugo and Nebula awards
- List of science fiction awards
- Locus Award – Speculative fiction literary awards by Locus magazine
