= The Four Sisters Overlooking the Sea =

"The Four Sisters Overlooking the Sea" is a 2024 science fiction short story by Naomi Kritzer. It was first published in Asimov's Science Fiction.

== Synopsis ==
Fifteen years after her scientific career ended abruptly when all her research data into communication in gray seals was lost, Morgan and her husband Stuart move to the small Cape Cod town of Finstowe, where the legend of the selkie plays an outsize role in local culture.

== Reception ==
"The Four Sisters Overlooking the Sea" won the 2025 Hugo Award for Best Novelette.

In Locus, A. C. Wise described it as "smoothly written".
