= Hugo Award =

Annual award for science fiction or fantasy

- Awarded for: Best science fiction or fantasy works of previous year
- Presented by: World Science Fiction Society
- First award: 1953; 73 years ago
- Website: thehugoawards.org

The Hugo Award is an annual literary award for the best science fiction or fantasy works and achievements of the previous year, given at the World Science Fiction Convention (Worldcon) and chosen by its members. The award is administered by the World Science Fiction Society. It is named after Hugo Gernsback, the founder of the pioneering science fiction magazine Amazing Stories. Hugos were first given in 1953, at the 11th World Science Fiction Convention, and have been awarded every year since 1955. In 2010, Wired called the Hugo "the premier award in the science fiction genre", while The Guardian has called it the most important science fiction award alongside the Nebula Award.

The awards originally covered seven categories, but have expanded to eighteen categories of written and dramatic works over the years. The winners receive a trophy consisting of a stylized rocket ship on a base. The design of the trophy changes each year, though the rocket shape has been consistent since 1984.

The 2026 awards were presented at the 84th Worldcon, "LAcon V", in Anaheim, California, in the United States on August 30, 2026. The 2027 awards will be presented at the 85th Worldcon, "Montréal Worldcon 2027", in Montreal Canada in the first week of September 2027.

== Award ==
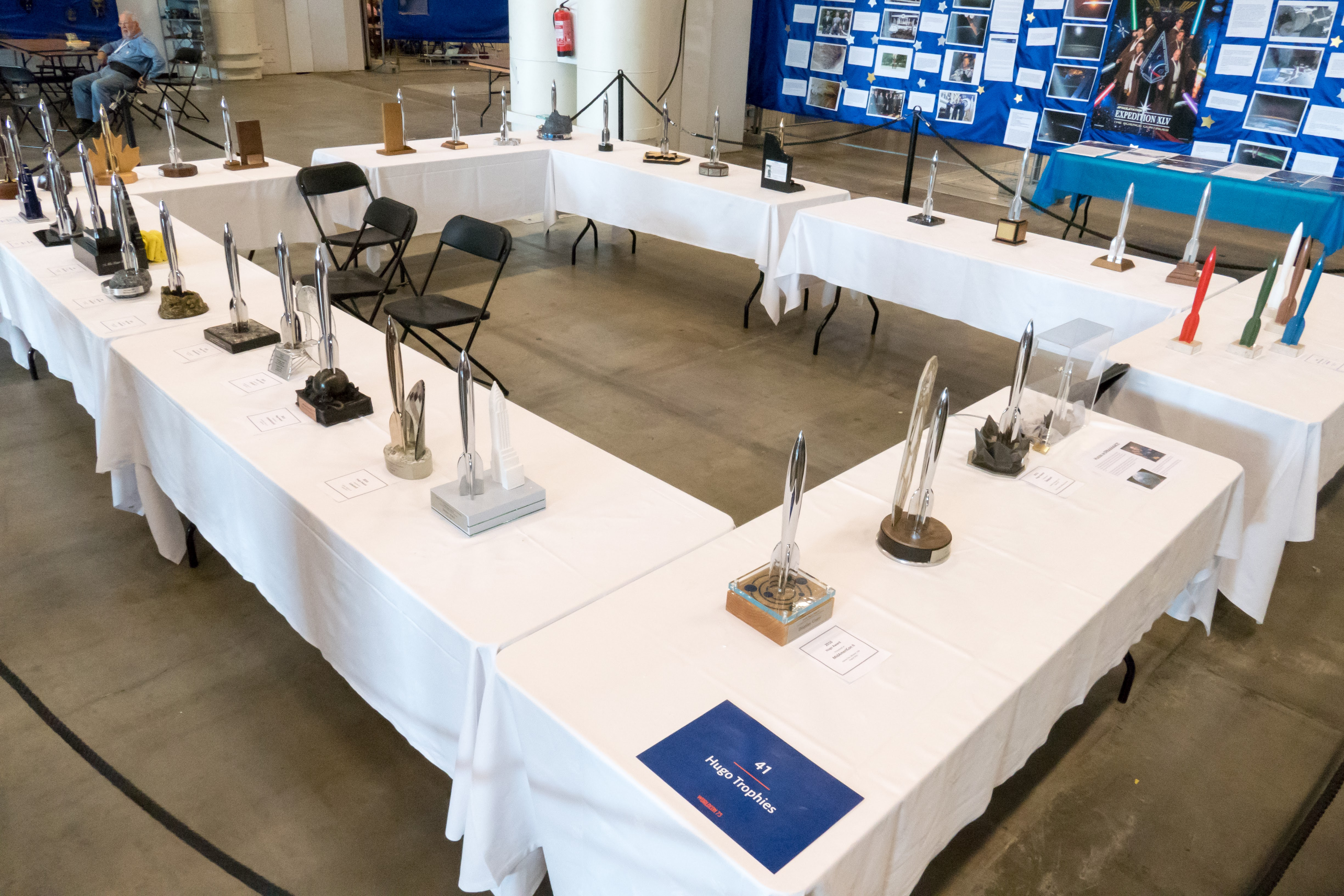
Hugo Awards through the years exhibited in Helsinki, 2017

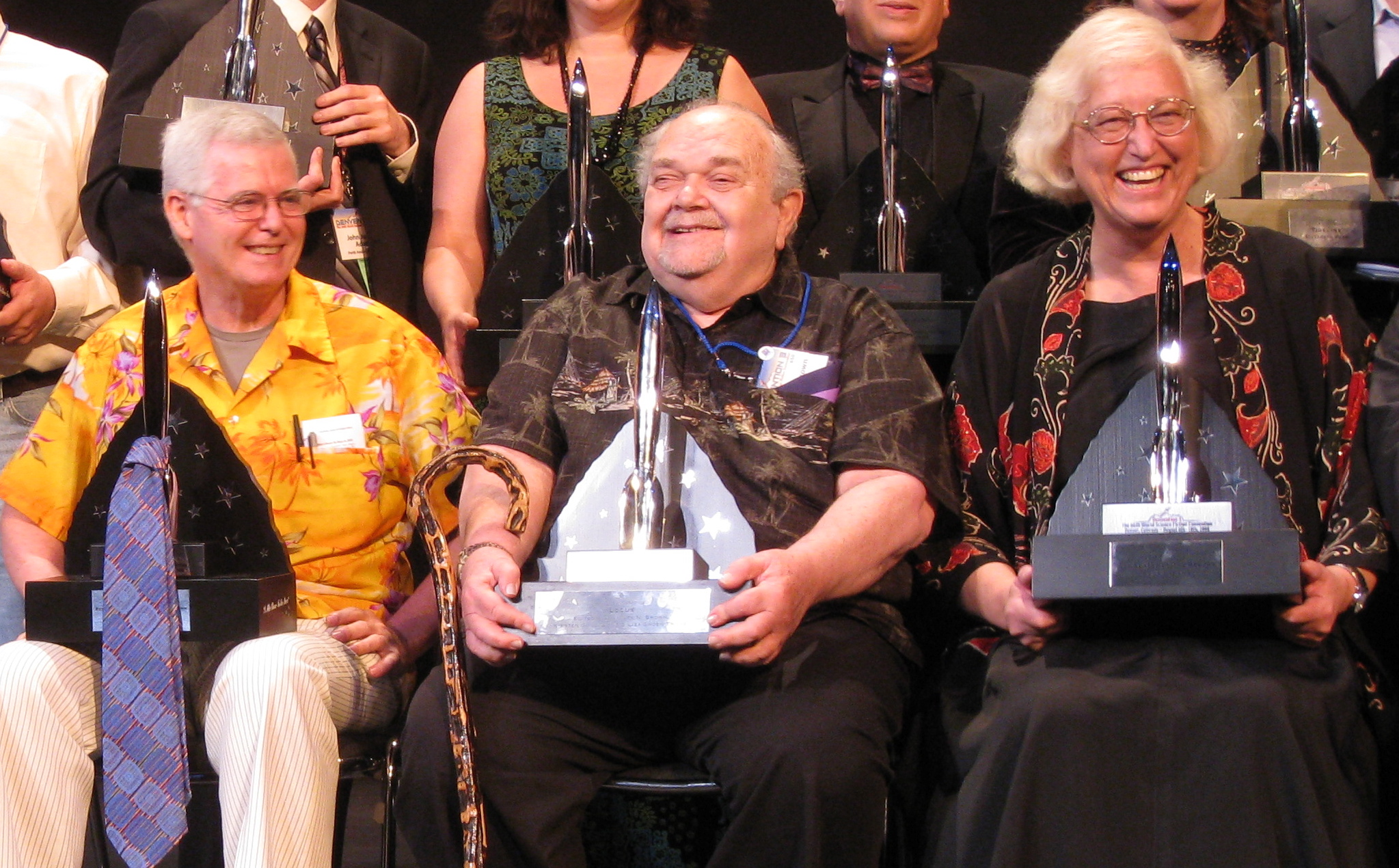
David Hartwell, Charles N. Brown, and Connie Willis pose with the 2008 Hugo Awards.

The World Science Fiction Society (WSFS) gives out the Hugo Awards each year for the best science fiction or fantasy works and achievements of the previous year. The Hugos are widely considered the premier award in science fiction. The award is named after Hugo Gernsback, who founded the pioneering science fiction magazine Amazing Stories and who is considered one of the "fathers" of the science fiction genre. Hugo Award finalists and winners are chosen by supporting or attending members of the annual World Science Fiction Convention, or Worldcon, and the presentation evening constitutes its central event. The awards are split over more than a dozen categories, and include both written and dramatic works.

The idea of giving out awards at Worldcons was proposed by Harold Lynch for the 1953 convention. The idea was based on the Academy Awards, with the name "Hugo" being given by Robert A. Madle. The award trophy was created by Jack McKnight and Ben Jason in 1953, based on the design of hood ornaments of 1950s cars. It consisted of a finned rocket ship on a wooden base. Each subsequent trophy, with the exception of the 1958 trophy (a plaque), has been similar to the original design. The current design of the trophy rocket, which is now considered definitive, has been the same since Peter Weston’s refinement of the design debuted in 1984. Since then only the base of the trophy has changed each year. There is no monetary or other remuneration associated with the Hugo, other than the trophy.

=== Process ===
Members of the current or previous year's Worldcon are allowed to submit a nomination ballot of works from January through March of each year, with a limit of five nominations per category. Works are eligible for an award if they were published or first translated into English in the prior calendar year. There are no written rules as to which works qualify as science fiction or fantasy, and the decision of eligibility in that regard is left up to the voters, rather than to the organizing committee. These nominations are then used to make the list of six finalists per category using a custom-designed voting system known as E Pluribus Hugo ("from many, a Hugo"). Finalists are also restricted to two finalists by each author in each category. Members of the current year's Worldcon then rank the finalists in each category in a vote held roughly from April through July, subject to change depending on when that year's Worldcon is held. These votes are counted using instant-runoff voting to determine the winner in each category. Voters may also vote for "no award" in any category, indicating that they feel that any finalists ranked below it are not worthy of a Hugo in that category.

Prior to 2017, the final ballot was five works in each category, and the process to determine the finalists did not use E Pluribus Hugo. Worldcons are generally held near the start of September, and take place in a different city around the world each year.

=== Retro-Hugos ===
Retrospective Hugo Awards, or Retro-Hugos, were added to the Hugos in 1996. They were awards given by a convention for years 50, 75, or 100 years earlier in which a Worldcon was held but in which no Hugos were awarded. In 2017, the eligible years were expanded to include years after 1939 in which no Worldcon was held. Retro-Hugos were optional; some Worldcons chose not to award them despite a year being eligible. Of the fifteen eligible years, awards were given for eight. In 2025, the WSFS constitution was amended to remove Retro-Hugos.

== History ==
=== 1950s ===
The first Hugo Awards were presented at the 11th Worldcon in Philadelphia in 1953, which awarded Hugos in seven categories. The awards presented that year were initially conceived as a one-off event, though the organizers hoped that subsequent conventions would also present them. At the time, Worldcons were completely run by their respective committees as independent events and had no oversight between years. Thus there was no mandate for any future conventions to repeat the awards, and no set rules for how to do so.

The 1954 Worldcon chose not to, but the awards were reinstated at the 1955 Worldcon, and thereafter became traditional. The award was called the Annual Science Fiction Achievement Award, with "Hugo Award" being an unofficial, but better known name. The nickname was accepted as an official alternative name in 1958, and since the 1992 awards the nickname has been adopted as the official name of the award.

For the first few years, Hugo Awards had no published rules, and were given for works published in the "preceding year" leading up to the convention, which was not defined but generally covered the period between conventions rather than calendar years. In 1959, though there were still no formal guidelines governing the awards, several rules were instated which thereafter became traditional. These included having a ballot for nominating works earlier in the year and separate from the voting ballot; defining eligibility to include works published in the previous calendar year, rather than the ambiguous "preceding year"; and allowing voters to select "No Award" as an option if no finalists were felt to be deserving of the award. "No Award" won that year in two categories: Dramatic Presentation and Best New Author. The eligibility change additionally sparked a separate rule, prohibiting the nomination of works which had been nominated for the 1958 awards, as the two time periods overlapped.

=== 1960s ===
In 1961, after the formation of the WSFS to oversee each Worldcon committee, formal rules were set down in the WSFS constitution mandating the presenting of the awards as one of the responsibilities of each Worldcon organizing committee. The rules restricted voting to members of the convention at which the awards would be given, while still allowing anyone to nominate works; nominations were restricted to members of the convention or the previous year's convention in 1963. The guidelines also specified the categories that would be awarded, which could only be changed by the World Science Fiction Society board. These categories were for Best Novel, Short Fiction (short stories, broadly defined), Dramatic Presentation, Professional Magazine, Professional Artist, and Best Fanzine. 1963 was also the second year in which "No Award" won a category, again for Dramatic Presentation.

In 1964 the guidelines were changed to allow individual conventions to create additional categories, which was codified as up to two categories for that year. These additional awards were officially designated as Hugo Awards, but were not required to be repeated by future conventions. This was later adjusted to only allow one additional category; while these special Hugo Awards have been given out in several categories, only a few were ever awarded for more than one year.

In 1967 categories for Novelette, Fan Writer, and Fan Artist were added, and a category for Best Novella was added the following year; these new categories provided a definition for what word count qualified a work for what category, which was previously left up to voters. Novelettes had also been awarded prior to the codification of the rules. The fan awards were initially conceived as separate from the Hugo Awards, with the award for Best Fanzine losing its status, but were instead absorbed into the regular Hugo Awards by the convention committee.

=== 1970s ===
While traditionally five works had been selected as finalists in each category out of the proposed nominees, in 1971 this was set down as a formal rule, barring ties. In 1973, the WSFS removed the category for Best Professional Magazine, and a Best Professional Editor award was instated as its replacement, in order to recognize "the increasing importance of original anthologies".

After that year the guidelines were changed again to remove the mandated awards and instead allow up to ten categories which would be chosen by each convention, though they were expected to be similar to those presented in the year before. Despite this change no new awards were added or previous awards removed before the guidelines were changed back to listing specific categories in 1977. 1971 and 1977 both saw "No Award" win the Dramatic Presentation category for the third and fourth time; "No Award" did not win any categories afterwards until 2015.

=== 1980s and 1990s ===
In 1980 the category for Best Non-Fiction Book (later renamed Best Related Work) was added, followed by a category for Best Semiprozine (semi-professional magazine) in 1984. In 1983, members of the Church of Scientology were encouraged by people such as Charles Platt to nominate as a bloc Battlefield Earth, written by the organization's founder L. Ron Hubbard, for the Best Novel award; it did not make the final ballot. Another campaign followed in 1987 to nominate Hubbard's Black Genesis; it made the final ballot but finished behind "No Award". 1989 saw a work — The Guardsman by Todd Hamilton and P. J. Beese — withdrawn by its authors from the final ballot after a fan bought numerous memberships under false names, all sent in on the same day, in order to get the work onto the ballot.

In 1990, the Best Original Art Work award was given as a special Hugo Award, and was listed again in 1991, though not actually awarded, and established afterward as an official Hugo Award. It was then removed from this status in 1996, and has not been awarded since. The Retro Hugos were created in the mid-1990s, and were first awarded in 1996.

=== Since 2000 ===
Another special Hugo Award, for Best Web Site, was given twice in 2002 and 2005, but never instated as a permanent category. In 2003, the Dramatic Presentation award was split into two categories, Long Form and Short Form. This was repeated with the Best Professional Editor category in 2007. 2009 saw the addition of the Best Graphic Story category, and in 2012 an award for Best Fancast was added. Best Series was added as a permanent category in 2018; it was run the year prior as a special Hugo Award prior to being ratified at the business meeting. Another special Hugo Award, for Best Art Book, was run in 2019 but was not repeated or made a permanent category. The 2021 Hugo Awards featured a special Hugo award for video games. It was thereafter proposed as a permanent category; it was not repeated as a special Hugo Award in 2022 or 2023, but was ratified as the Best Game or Interactive Work category, beginning in 2024.

==== 2015–2016: Voting bloc campaigns ====
In 2015, two groups of science fiction writers, the "Sad Puppies" led by Brad R. Torgersen and Larry Correia, and the "Rabid Puppies" led by Vox Day, each put forward a similar slate of suggested nominations which came to dominate the ballot. The Sad Puppies campaign had run for two years prior on a smaller scale, with limited success. The leaders of the campaigns characterized them as a reaction to "niche, academic, overtly [leftist]" nominees and the Hugo becoming "an affirmative action award" that preferred female and non-white authors and characters. In response, five nominees declined their nomination before and, for the first time, two after the ballot was published. Multiple-Hugo-winner Connie Willis declined to present the awards. The slates were characterized by The Guardian as a "right wing", "orchestrated backlash" and by The A.V. Club as a "group of white guys", and were linked with the Gamergate campaign. Multiple Hugo winner Samuel R. Delany characterized the campaigns as a response to "socio-economic" changes such as minority authors gaining prominence and thus "economic heft". In all but the Best Dramatic Presentation, Long Form category, "No Award" placed above all finalists that were on either slate, and it won all five categories that only contained slate nominees. The two campaigns were repeated in 2016 with some changes, and the "Rabid Puppy" slate again dominated the ballot in several categories, with all five finalists in Best Related Work, Best Graphic Story, Best Professional Artist, and Best Fancast.

In response to the campaigns, a set of new rules, called "E Pluribus Hugo", was passed in 2015 and ratified in 2016 to modify the nominations process. Intended to ensure that organized minority groups cannot dominate every finalist position in a category, the new rules define a voting system in which nominees are eliminated one by one, with each vote for an eliminated work then spread out over the uneliminated works they nominated, until only the final shortlist remains. These rules were ratified in 2016 to be used for the first time in 2017. A rule mandating that the finalists must appear on at least five percent of ballots was also eliminated, to ensure that all categories could reach a full set of finalists even when the initial pool of works was very large. Each nominator is limited to five works in each category, but the final ballot was changed to six in each; additionally, no more than two works by a given author or group, or in the same dramatic series, can be in one category on the final ballot.

==== 2023: Ballot censorship ====
In January 2024, the voting statistics for the 2023 Hugo Awards from the 81st World Science Fiction Convention, which was held in Chengdu, China, came into question due to several authors being declared ineligible without explanation, including Neil Gaiman, R. F. Kuang, Xiran Jay Zhao, and Paul Weimer. Leaked emails revealed that the authors were excluded due to self-censorship by the Hugo Award administrators in order to appease the Chinese government, known to have a strict censorship regime. Additionally, an unknown number of ballots from Chinese voters were rejected because an award administrator considered them to be similar to a recommendations list published by the Chinese SF magazine Science Fiction World, and thus equivalent to a slate, even though there was no rule against slates.

Based on complaints about the 2023 Hugo award process and official statements made about those complaints, Worldcon Intellectual Property (WIP), the non-profit organization that holds the service marks for the World Science Fiction Society, censured the director of WIP and two individuals who presided over the Hugo Administration Committee of the Chengdu Worldcon, and reprimanded the chair of the WIP board of directors. Both the director of WIP and chair of the WIP board of directors resigned. Glasgow 2024 Chairperson Esther MacCallum-Stewart announced in February 2024 that to ensure transparency in the awards selection, they would keep a log of all decisions, publish the reasons for any disqualification of potential finalists by April 2024, and publish the full voting statistics immediately after the awards ceremony on August 11.

==== 2024: Voter fraud ====
In July 2024, the Hugo administration announced that roughly 10% of all votes cast for that year were determined to be fraudulently cast to help one unidentified finalist win. There was no evidence that the finalist had known about the attempt; the votes were invalidated and the finalist did not win the category as a result. The Guardian estimated that the 377 memberships purchased for the attempt would have cost at least £16,965 (US$22,000).

== Categories ==
Current categories
Categories	Year started	Current description
Best Novel	1953	Stories of 40,000 words or more
Best Novella	1968	Stories of between 17,500 and 40,000 words
Best Novelette	1955	Stories of between 7,500 and 17,500 words
Best Short Story	1955	Stories of less than 7,500 words
Best Series	2017	Series of works
Best Related Work	1980	Works which are either non-fiction or noteworthy for reasons other than the fictional text
Best Graphic Story or Comic	2009	Stories told in graphic form. Award was named "Best Graphic Story" prior to 2020.
Best Dramatic Presentation (Long and Short Forms)	1958	Dramatized productions, divided since 2003 between works longer or shorter than 90 minutes
Best Semiprozine	1984	Semi-professional magazines
Best Fanzine	1955	Non-professional magazines
Best Professional Editor (Long and Short Forms)	1973	Editors of written works, divided since 2007 between editors of novels or editors of magazines and anthologies
Best Professional Artist	1953	Professional artists
Best Fan Artist	1967	Fan artists
Best Fan Writer	1967	Fan writers
Best Fancast	2012	Audiovisual fanzines
Best Game or Interactive Work	2021	Games (video or tabletop) and interactive fiction
Best Poem	2025	Poems

Former repeating categories
Categories	Years active	Description
Best Professional Magazine	1953–1972	Professional magazines
Short Fiction	1960–1966	Stories of shorter than novel length. This category is generally treated as the same award as Best Short Story (see winners there), but it also included works of novella and novelette length.
Best Original Art Work	1990, 1992–1996	Works of art

Categories awarded by individual Worldcons
Categories	Years active	Description
Best Cover Artist	1953	Artists of covers for books and magazines
Best Interior Illustrator	1953	Artists of works inside magazines
Excellence in Fact Articles	1953	Authors of factual articles
Best New SF Author or Artist	1953	New authors or artists
#1 Fan Personality	1953	Favorite fan
Best Feature Writer	1956	Writers of magazine features
Best Book Reviewer	1956	Writers of book reviews
Most Promising New Author	1956	New authors
Outstanding Actifan	1958	Favorite fan
Best New Author	1959	New authors
Best SF Book Publisher	1964, 1965	Book publishers
Best All-Time Series	1966	Series of works
Other Forms	1988	Printed fictional works which were not novels, novellas, novelettes, or short stories
Best Web Site	2002, 2005	Websites
Best Art Book	2019	Books of artwork

Worldcon committees may also give out special awards during the Hugo ceremony, which are not voted on. Unlike the additional Hugo categories which Worldcons may present, these awards are not officially Hugo Awards and do not use the same trophy, though they once did. Two additional awards, the Astounding Award for Best New Writer and the Lodestar Award for Best Young Adult Book, are presented at the Hugo Award ceremony and voted on by the same process, but are not formally Hugo Awards.

== Recognition ==
The Hugo Award is highly regarded by observers. The Los Angeles Times has termed it "among the highest honors bestowed in science fiction and fantasy writing", a claim echoed by Wired, who said that it was "the premier award in the science fiction genre". Justine Larbalestier, in The Battle of the Sexes in Science Fiction (2002), referred to the awards as "the best known and most prestigious of the science fiction awards", and Jo Walton, writing in An Informal History of the Hugos, said it was "undoubtedly science fiction's premier award". The Guardian similarly acknowledged it as "a fine showcase for speculative fiction" as well as "one of the most venerable, democratic and international" science fiction awards "in existence". James Gunn, in The New Encyclopedia of Science Fiction (1988), echoed The Guardian's statement of the award's democratic nature, saying that "because of its broad electorate" the Hugos were the awards most representative of "reader popularity". Camille Bacon-Smith, in Science Fiction Culture (2000), said that at the time fewer than 1,000 people voted on the final ballot; she held, however, that this is a representative sample of the readership at large, given the number of winning novels that remain in print for decades or become notable outside of the science fiction genre, such as The Demolished Man or The Left Hand of Darkness. The 2014 awards saw over 1,900 nomination submissions and over 3,500 voters on the final ballot, while the 1964 awards received 274 votes. The 2019 awards saw 1,800 nominating ballots and 3,097 votes, which was described as less than in 2014–2017 but more than any year before then.

Brian Aldiss, in his book Trillion Year Spree: The History of Science Fiction, claimed that the Hugo Award was a barometer of reader popularity, rather than artistic merit; he contrasted it with the panel-selected Nebula Award, which provided "more literary judgment", though he did note that the winners of the two awards often overlapped. Along with the Hugo Award, the Nebula Award is also considered one of the premier awards in science fiction, with Laura Miller of Salon.com terming it "science fiction's most prestigious award".

The official logo of the Hugo Awards is often placed on the winning books' cover as a promotional tool. Gahan Wilson, in First World Fantasy Awards (1977), claimed that noting that a book had won the Hugo Award on the cover "demonstrably" increased sales for that novel, though Orson Scott Card said in his 1990 book How to Write Science Fiction & Fantasy that the award had a larger effect on foreign sales than in the United States. Spider Robinson, in 1992, claimed that publishers were very interested in authors that won a Hugo Award, more so than for other awards such as the Nebula Award. Literary agent Richard Curtis said in his 1996 Mastering the Business of Writing that having the term Hugo Award on the cover, even as a nominee, was a "powerful inducement" to science fiction fans to buy a novel, while Jo Walton claimed in 2011 that the Hugo is the only science fiction award "that actually affects sales of a book".

There have been several anthologies of Hugo-winning short fiction. The series The Hugo Winners, edited by Isaac Asimov, was started in 1962 as a collection of short story winners up to the previous year, and concluded with the 1982 Hugos in Volume 5. The New Hugo Winners, edited originally by Asimov, later by Connie Willis and finally by Gregory Benford, has four volumes collecting stories from the 1983 to the 1994 Hugos. The most recent anthology is The Hugo Award Showcase (2010), edited by Mary Robinette Kowal. It contains most of the short stories, novelettes, and novellas that were nominated for the 2009 award.

== See also ==
- Big Heart Award – Award for supporting SF fandom
- BSFA Award – British science fiction awards
- List of science fiction awards
- Locus Award – Speculative fiction literary awards by Locus magazine
- Nebula Award – Literature prize for science fiction and fantasy works from the United States
