= Hugo Award for Best Game or Interactive Work =

Annual award for science fiction or fantasy

- Awarded for: The best science fiction or fantasy game or interactive work released in the prior calendar year
- Presented by: World Science Fiction Society
- First award: 2021
- Most recent winner: Clair Obscur: Expedition 33
- Website: thehugoawards.org

The Hugo Award for Best Game or Interactive Work is one of the Hugo Awards given each year for science fiction or fantasy works released in the previous calendar year. The game award is given out to video games, tabletop games, and other interactive works; non-interactive audiovisual works receive awards in the dramatic presentation category. The Hugo Awards have been described as "a fine showcase for speculative fiction", and "the best known literary award for science fiction writing".

The Hugo Award for Best Game or Interactive Work was started as an annual category by the World Science Fiction Society in 2024. Prior to then, when the category was first successfully proposed in 2021, an example one-off version of the category was awarded as Best Video Game, under rules which allow individual one-off categories to be awarded in any given year. An earlier attempt at a one-off game category, entitled Best Interactive Video Game, had been made in 2006 but did not receive enough nominations to form a final ballot.

Hugo Award nominees and winners are chosen by supporting or attending members of the annual World Science Fiction Convention, or Worldcon, and the presentation evening constitutes its central event. The final selection process is defined in the World Science Fiction Society Constitution as instant-runoff voting with six finalists, except in the case of a tie. The works on the ballot are the six most-nominated by members that year. Initial nominations are made by members from January through March, while voting on the ballot of six finalists is performed roughly from April through July, subject to change depending on when that year's Worldcon is held. Worldcons are generally held in August or early September, and are held in a different city around the world each year.

During the four years the category has been active, 24 video games by 22 developers have been finalists. Hades by Supergiant Games won under the Best Video Game title, Baldur's Gate 3 by Larian Studios won the formal inaugural year, Caves of Qud by Freehold Games won in 2025, and Clair Obscur: Expedition 33 by Sandfall Interactive won in 2026.

== Winners and finalists ==
In the following table, the years correspond to the date of the ceremony, rather than when the work was first published. Entries with a yellow background have won the award; those with a gray background are the finalists on the short-list.

* Winners

Best Video Game
Year	Game	Developer	Publisher	Ref.
2021	Hades*	Supergiant Games	Supergiant Games	
2021	Animal Crossing: New Horizons	Nintendo	Nintendo	
2021	Blaseball	The Game Band	The Game Band	
2021	Final Fantasy VII Remake	Square Enix	Square Enix	
2021	The Last of Us Part II	Naughty Dog	Sony Interactive Entertainment	
2021	Spiritfarer	Thunder Lotus Games	Thunder Lotus Games	
2024	Baldur's Gate 3*	Larian Studios	Larian Studios	
2024	Alan Wake 2	Remedy Entertainment	Epic Games	
2024	Chants of Sennaar	Rundisc	Focus Entertainment	
2024	Dredge	Black Salt Games	Team17	
2024	The Legend of Zelda: Tears of the Kingdom	Nintendo	Nintendo	
2024	Star Wars Jedi: Survivor	Respawn Entertainment	Electronic Arts	
2025	Caves of Qud*	Freehold Games	Kitfox Games	
2025	Dragon Age: The Veilguard	BioWare	Electronic Arts	
2025	The Legend of Zelda: Echoes of Wisdom	Nintendo, Grezzo	Nintendo	
2025	Lorelei and the Laser Eyes	Simogo	Annapurna Interactive	
2025	Tactical Breach Wizards	Suspicious Developments	Suspicious Developments	
2025	1000xResist	Sunset Visitor	Fellow Traveller Games	
2026	Clair Obscur: Expedition 33*	Sandfall Interactive	Kepler Interactive	
2026	Blue Prince	Dogubomb	Raw Fury	
2026	Citizen Sleeper 2: Starward Vector	Jump Over the Age	Fellow Traveller Games	
2026	Dispatch	AdHoc Studio	AdHoc Studio	
2026	Hades II	Supergiant Games	Supergiant Games	
2026	Hollow Knight: Silksong	Team Cherry	Team Cherry	

== See also ==
- Nebula Award for Best Game Writing
