= Noreascon =

Noreascon is the name given to four Worldcons (World Science Fiction Conventions), all held in Boston, Massachusetts, United States. The latter three were run by Massachusetts Convention Fandom, Inc.

- 29th World Science Fiction Convention — Noreascon I (1971)
- 38th World Science Fiction Convention — Noreascon Two (1980)
- 47th World Science Fiction Convention — Noreascon 3 (1989)
- 62nd World Science Fiction Convention — Noreascon 4 (2004)
