= BayCon =

Science fiction convention in the San Francisco Bay Area

- Status: Active
- Genre: Science fiction/Fantasy
- Venue: Santa Clara Marriott Hotel
- Locations: Santa Clara, California
- Country: United States
- Inaugurated: 1982
- Organizer: John McLaughlin and Randall Cooper
- Website: http://www.baycon.org/

Cosplayer at BayCon 2003

BayCon is the San Francisco Bay Area's longest-running fan-run speculative fiction convention. It was held over Memorial Day weekend in the San Francisco Bay Area, California but moved to July 4, Independence Day. BayCon draws many attendees from throughout California and also as far away as Oregon, Washington, and Arizona. The most recent BayCon was held from July 3–6, 2026, in Santa Clara, California. The next BayCon is scheduled for July 2–5, 2027.

== Guests ==
Some of the better known regular attendees include Howard Hendrix, Diana Paxson, Lee Martindale, and Irene Radford. Past Writer Guests of Honor include Peter S. Beagle, David Brin, Orson Scott Card, Harlan Ellison, David Gerrold, James P. Hogan, Larry Niven, Spider and Jeanne Robinson, Brandon Sanderson, Harry Turtledove, David Weber, and Gene Wolfe. Past Artist Guests of Honor include Bob Eggleton, Frank Kelly Freas, Stephan Martinière, John Picacio, Rick Sternbach, and Michael Whelan. Past Fan Guests of Honor include Forrest J Ackerman, Mike Glyer, and Art Widner. Past Special Guests include Poppy Z. Brite, Mike Jittlov, and Jerry Pournelle. Toastmasters have included Kent Brewster, Raymond E. Feist, Laura Brodian Freas, Richard A. Lupoff, George R. R. Martin, Seanan McGuire, Frank M. Robinson, and Scott Sigler.

== Previous Conventions ==
The name was previously used by the 1961 Westercon, 1968 Worldcon, in Berkeley and Oakland, and a San Francisco Bay Area comics convention from 1975-78 in Berkeley.

Carmila from Vampire Hunter D Cosplayer at BayCon 2003

== History ==
Co-founded by John McLaughlin and Randall Cooper, the first BayCon in its current existence as "The San Francisco Bay Area Regional Science Fiction and Fantasy Convention" was held over Thanksgiving weekend in 1982. BayCon '83 was also held over Thanksgiving weekend. To avoid conflicts with Southern California's annual regional convention, Loscon, BayCon moved to Memorial Day weekend, skipping Thanksgiving in 1984. For most of its history, it was held at the Doubletree Hotel in San Jose (formerly the Red Lion). In 2007, it was held at the San Mateo Marriott Hotel. Beginning in 2008, and through 2015, BayCon was held at the Hyatt Regency Santa Clara and Santa Clara Convention Center in Santa Clara, California.

== Conventions ==
=== Past ===
BayCon '82 was held in 1982, in San Jose, California.

BayCon '87 was held May 22–25, 1987, at the San Jose Red Lion Hotel.

BayCon '88 was held May 27–30, 1988, at the San Jose Red Lion Hotel. Honored guests included writer Somtow Sucharitkul, artist Tom Kidd, and fan John McLaughlin.

BayCon '89 was held in 1989, in San Jose, California.

BayCon'92 was held May, 1992, at the San Jose Red Lion Hotel. As the "tenth anniversary" of the convention it boasted "26 Guests of honor" including Forrest J. Ackerman, Raymond E. Feist, Ben Bova and others.

BayCon '95 was held May 26–29, 1995, at the San Jose Red Lion Hotel. Honored guests included writer Joe Haldeman, artist Frank Lurz, special music guest Jordin Kare, and fan Jana Keeler.

BayCon '96 was held May 24–27, 1996, at the San Jose Red Lion Hotel. Honored guests included writer Jennifer Roberson, artist Mary Hanson-Roberts, fan Forrest J. Ackerman, musician Heather Alexander, and toastmasters Kevin J. Anderson & Rebecca Moesta. Charity efforts raised over $2700 for the American Cancer Society. Paid attendance for the weekend totaled just over 1750 members.

BayCon '97 was held May 23–26, 1997, at the San Jose Red Lion Hotel. The event's theme was "Space Flights of Fancy: Let Your Imagination Take Wing!". Honored guests included writer Jack L. Chalker, artist Bob Eggleton, fans Craig & Sharon Nicolai, and toastmaster Tad Williams. Michael Siladi served as convention chairman.

BayCon '98 was held May 22–25, 1998, at the San Jose DoubleTree Hotel—the same hotel as in recent years under a new flag. The event's theme was "Alternate Universes and Other Possibilities". Honored guests included writer S.M. Stirling, artist Alicia Austin, fan Michael Siladi, and toastmaster Lillian Csernica.

BayCon 1999 was held May 28–31, 1999, at the San Jose DoubleTree Hotel. The event's theme was "Bold Deeds and Grand Epics". Honored guests included writers Kevin J. Anderson & Rebecca Moesta, artist Nene Tina Thomas, fan Jan Price, and toastmaster Kent Brewster. Charity efforts raised funds for Bay Area Literacy.

BayCon 2000 was held May 26–29, 2000, at the San Jose DoubleTree Hotel. The convention's theme was "Yesterday's Tomorrows"". Honored guests included writer Esther Friesner, artist Baron Engel, fan Dave Clark, and toastmaster Kent Brewster. Amy-Elyse Patterson served as convention chairman. The weekend's charity efforts raised $4,478 for the Friends of the California Air & Space Center.

BayCon 2001 was held May 25–28, 2001, at the San Jose DoubleTree Hotel. The weekend's theme was "All Your Monolith Are Belong To Us!!!". Honored guests included author Rudy Rucker, artist Bill Hartmann, fans Kathryn and James Stanley Daugherty, and special guest Poppy Z. Brite. The event included a "Towel Day" as a tribute to Douglas Adams who had died just two weeks before the convention. Charity efforts at the convention raised money for the Electronic Frontier Foundation/

BayCon 2002, the 20th anniversary convention, was held May 24–27, 2002, at the San Jose DoubleTree Hotel. The event's theme was "The Magic of Now". Honored guests included writer Harry Turtledove, artist Theresa Mather, fan Christian McGuire, and toastmaster Jane Mailander. Author Harlan Ellison was a special guest.

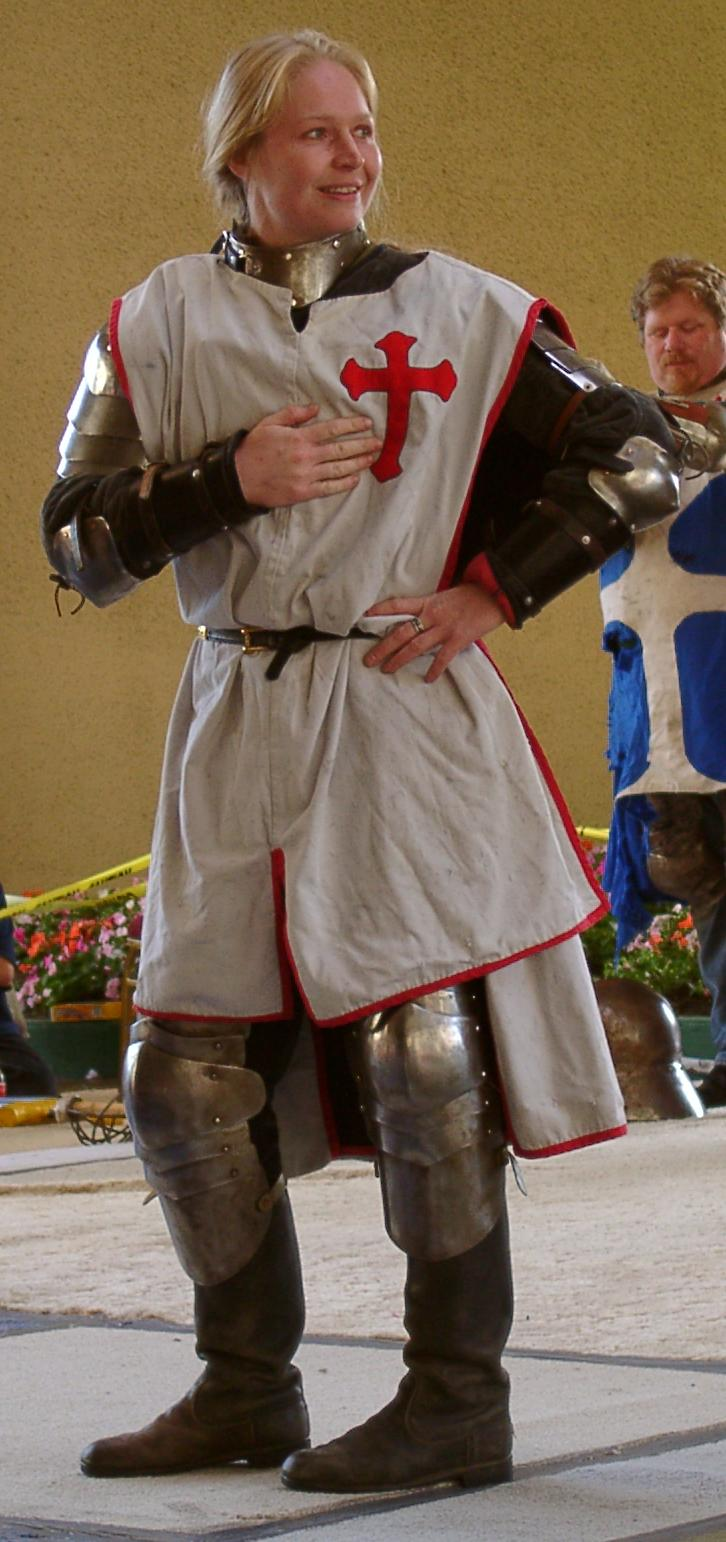
Cosplayer wearing a tabard over armour at BayCon 2002

BayCon 2003 was held May 23–26, 2003, at the San Jose DoubleTree Hotel. The convention's theme was "It's About Time!" Honored guests included writer Greg Bear, artist Mark Ferrari, fan Janice Gelb, and toastmaster Rachel Holmen.

BayCon 2004 was held May 28–31, 2004, at the San Jose DoubleTree Hotel. The event's theme was "Paradise Found". Honored guests included writer Michael Swanwick, artist Jael, fan Elayne Pelz, and toastmaster Esther Friesner. Tony Cratz served as convention chairman.

BayCon 2005 was held May 27–30, 2005, at the San Jose DoubleTree Hotel. The convention's theme was "The Con You Can't Refuse", a play on the famous line "an offer you can't refuse" from The Godfather. Honored guests included writer Jay Lake, artist Frank Wu, fans Kevin Roche & Andy Trembley, and toastmaster Christopher Garcia. The event also featured actress Chase Masterson as a special guest.

BayCon 2006 was held May 26–29, 2006, at the San Jose DoubleTree Hotel. The weekend's theme was "Tales of Purple Space". Honored guests included writers Larry Niven and Jerry Pournelle, fan Craig Miller, and actor Stephen Furst.

BayCon 2007, the 25th anniversary convention, was held May 25–28, 2007, at the San Mateo Marriott. The event's theme was "Silver Streak". Honored guests included science fiction writer Alan Dean Foster, fantasy writer Diana L. Paxson, artist Richard Hescox, fan Linda "Kitty" VonBraskat-Crowe, special guest Ctein, and toastmaster Seanan McGuire. The charity auction and casino raised money in support of the Polycystic Ovarian Syndrome Association.

BayCon 2008 was held May 23–26, 2008, at the Hyatt Regency Santa Clara. The event's theme was "Adventures in Space - A Pirate's Tale". Honored guests included writer Tim Powers, artist Todd Lockwood, fan Patty Wells, and toastmaster Scott Sigler.

BayCon 2009 was held May 22–25, 2009, at the Hyatt Regency Santa Clara. The theme for the weekend was "The Lost Sky City of Pyrocumulon". Honored guests included writers Mercedes Lackey and Larry Dixon, artist Tim Kirk, fan Fred Patten, and toastmaster Jennifer Brozek. Due to separate illnesses, Patten, Lackey, and Dixon were unable to attend the convention in person. The convention also featured a concert by Tempest and a special appearance by actress Chase Masterson.

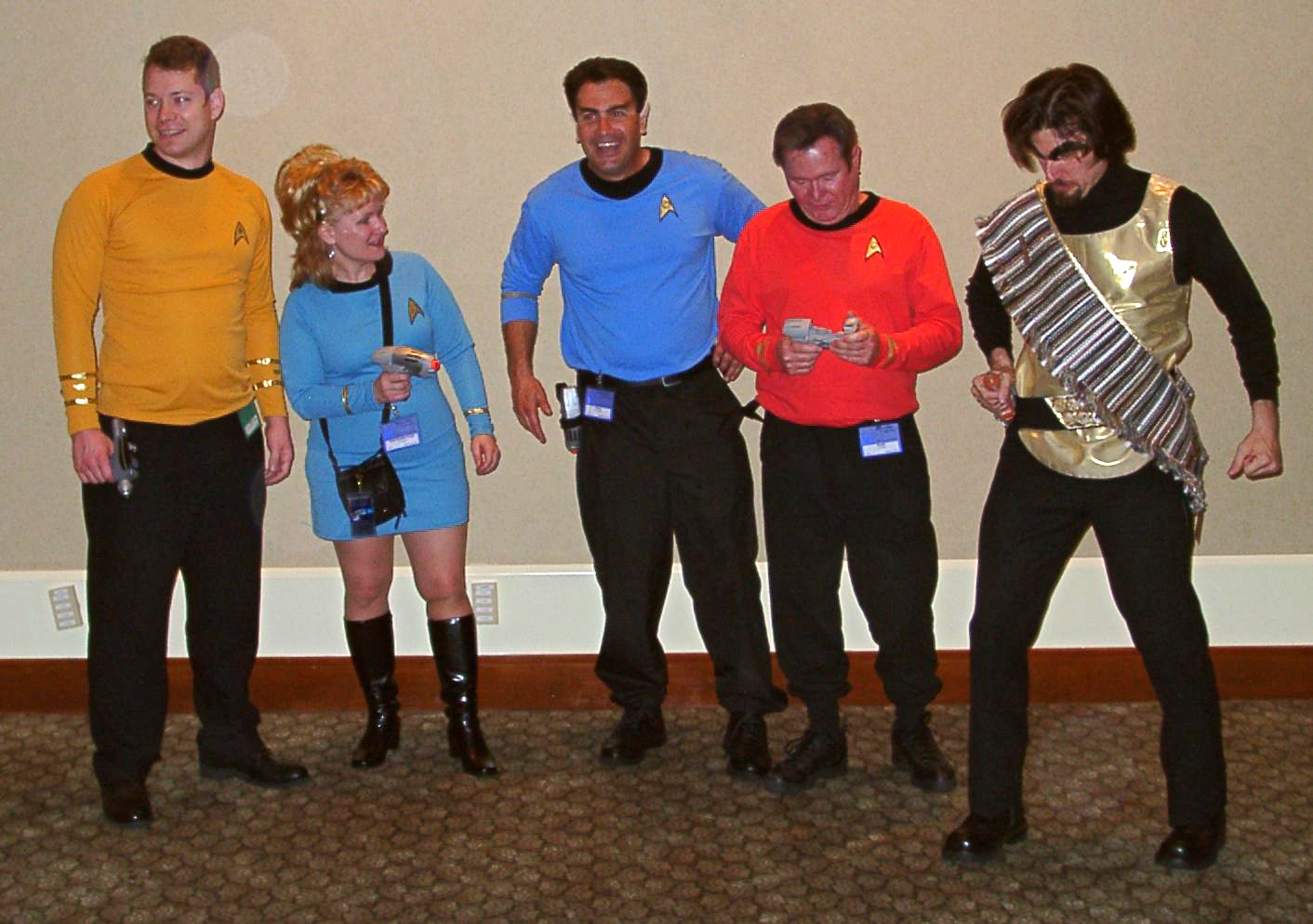
Trek Cosplayers at BayCon 2003

BayCon 2010 was held May 28–31, 2010, at the Hyatt Regency Santa Clara. The theme was "It's an adventure!" Honored guests included writer Peter S. Beagle, fans Colleen and Steve Savitzky, toastmaster Tadao Tomomatsu, artist Lee Moyer, and special guests Mercedes Lackey and Larry Dixon. Events at the convention raised money for the Comic Book Legal Defense Fund. In January 2010, twenty-two staff members resigned after the parent corporation, Artistic Solutions Inc., was suspended by the state of California due to a failure in filing tax returns. The situation was resolved in March 2010, and some of those who resigned agreed to return.

BayCon 2011 was held May 27–30, 2011, at the Hyatt Regency Santa Clara. The theme was "Carnivale". Guests of honor included Writer Guest of Honor Mary Robinette Kowal, Artist Guest of Honor John Picacio, Fan Guest of Honor Bobbie DuFault (chair for Seattle 2012 Westercon), and Toastmaster Martin Young. Charity events raised over $3000 for Noisebridge, a San Francisco hackerspace.

BayCon 2012 was held May 25–28, 2012, at the Hyatt Regency Santa Clara. The theme was "30th Anniversary Pleasure Cruise". The Writer Guest of Honor was Brandon Sanderson, the Artist Guest of Honor was Stephan Martinière, the Fan Guests of Honor were Scott and Cathy Beckstead, and the Toastmasters were Dani Kollin and Eytan Kollin. $4300 was raised for the charity, the Greater Bay Area chapter of the Make-A-Wish Foundation.

BayCon 2013 was held May 24–27, 2013, at the Hyatt Regency Santa Clara. The theme was "Triskaidekaphobicon". The Writer Guest of Honor was Lois McMaster Bujold, the Fan Guests of Honor were Chris and John O'Halloran, and the Toastmaster was Veronica Belmont.

BayCon 2014 was held May 23–26, 2014, at the Hyatt Regency Santa Clara. The theme was "Got Honor?". The Writer Guest of Honor was David Weber, the Fan Guest of Honor was Sally Woerhle, and the Toastmaster was Tom Merritt.

BayCon 2015 was held May 22–24, 2015, at the Hyatt Regency Santa Clara. The theme was "Women of Wonder". The Writer Guest of Honor was Seanan McGuire, the Artist Guest of Honor was Stephanie Pui-Mun Law, Special Guest were The Winner Twins, Fan Guest was Caradwen "Saber" Von Brasket Arellanes, and ToastMaster was Amber Benson. This was the first year there was an All Woman Guest of Honor Lineup. The charity was About-Face, a San Francisco based organization that teaches teen girls and youth media literacy, social media literacy, and activism skills.

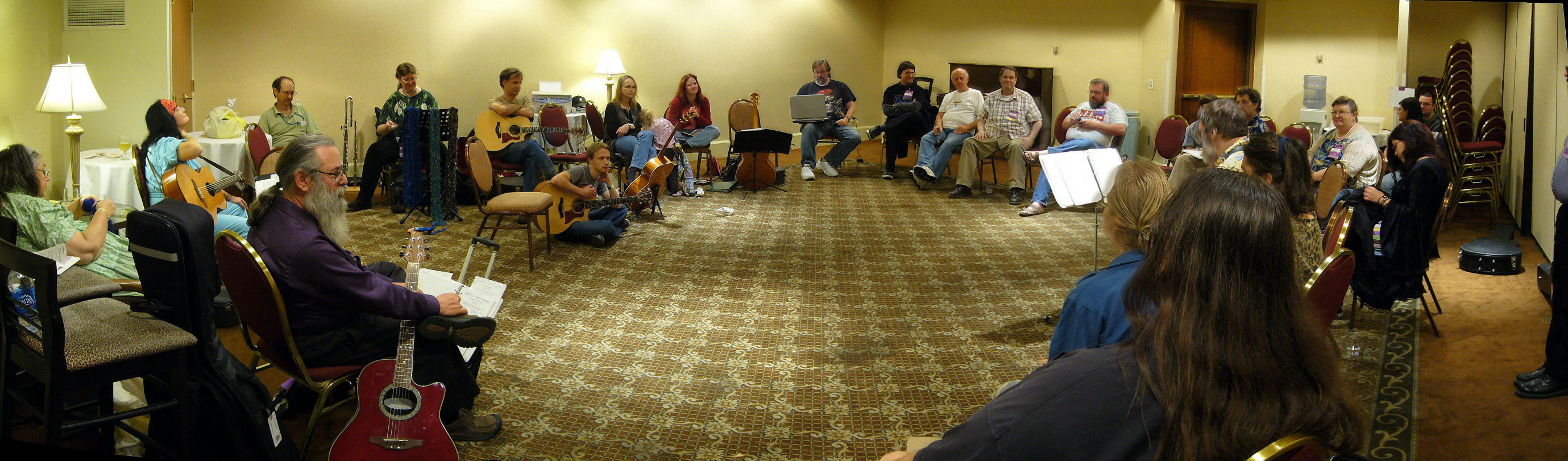
Baycon 2006 Filk Circle

BayCon 2016 was held May 27–30, 2016, at the San Mateo Marriott. The event's theme was "It's All About Space!" The Writer Guest of Honor was David Gerrold, the Artist Guest of Honor was Chris Butler, the Fan Guest of Honor was Anastasia Hunter, and the Toastmasters were the Library Bards. Charity events raised money in support of the SETI Institute.

BayCon 2017 was held May 26–29, 2017 in San Mateo, California. The theme was "Dystopia/Utopia". The Writer Guest of Honor was Daniel Abraham, the Artist Guest of Honor was Daniel Dociu, the Fan Guest of Honor was Dr. Christine Doyle, and the Toastmaster was Ty Franck. The charity was Variety.org.

BayCon 2018 was held May 25–28, 2018 in San Mateo, California. The theme was "Patchwork Fandom: Stitching The Generations Together." The Writer Guest of Honor was Tamera Pierce, the Artist Guest of Honor was Margaret Organ-Kean, Fan Guest Christopher J Garcia, Special Podcast Guest JC Arkham, and Toastmaster was M. Todd Gallowglas.

BayCon 2019 was held May 24–27, 2019. The theme was "Insert Coin to Continue." The Writer Guest of Honor was David Brin, The Artist Guest of Honor was Gary Villarreal, Fan Guest was Dr. Wanda Kurtcu, and Toastmaster was JC Arkham. The charity for this year was The Computer History Museum.

BayCon 2020 was scheduled for May 2020 but the in-person event was cancelled due to the 2020 Pandemic.

BayCon 2021 was a series of virtual events to keep the community connected.

BayCon 2022 was held July 1–4, 2022 at the San Mateo Marriot. The Theme was "The Sun Rises." Writer Guest of Honor was Steven Baren, Artist Guest of Honor was Galen Dara, and Jean Batt was Community Guest of Honor, Tananarive Due was a featured guest and Bonnie Gordon was toastmaster. The charity was Larkin Street Youth Services.

BayCon 2023 was held July 1–4, 2023. It was a combined event with MantiCon, which is The Royal Manticoran Navy: The Honor Harrington Fan Association, Inc.'s irregular conference. It was held at the Santa Clara Marriott and the 2023's theme is "A Night at the Space Opera (or It's Not Over Until the Space Whale Sings)." The Writer Guest of Honor was Catherynne M. Valente, Artist Guest of Honor Tehani Farr, Community Guest of Honor Bradford Lyau, Frank Wu as Toastmaster, and Brianna Wu as Special Community Guest and Laser Malena-Webber as Special Musical Guest. The charity for 2023 was The Planetary Society, and there was a special Guest Robert Picardo for the Planetary Society.

BayCon 2024 was held July 4–7, 2024. The theme was "Pure Imagination," and was held at the Santa Clara Marriott. Ryka Aoki, Elizabeth Leggett, Bonnie Gordon, and Raquel Santiago were the guests of honor. The charity was the Society for the Promotion of Speculative Fiction, the new parent non-profit organization for BayCon.

BayCon 2025 was held on July 4–7, 2025 at the Santa Clara Marriott. It was a combined event with Westercon 77. The theme was "A Convenient Parallel Dimension." The announced guests of honor are J.K. Woodward, Sasha Graham, M. A. Carrick, Catherine Mary Stewart, with community guests Stacy Meyn and Tracy Newby.

BayCon 42 was held on July 3–6, 2026 at the Santa Clara Marriott. It was a combined event with Westercon 78. The theme was "The Answer." The guests of honor were Charlie Jane Anders, Annalee Newitz, Sumiko Saulson, Jenay Marontate, and Desmond Crisis.
