= Bruce Pelz =

American artist and science fiction fan

- Born: Bruce Edward Pelz; August 11, 1936; Kearny, New Jersey, US
- Died: May 9, 2002 (aged 65); Los Angeles, California, US

Bruce Edward Pelz (August 11, 1936 – May 9, 2002) was a US science fiction fan. He was highly active in the Los Angeles Science Fantasy Society (LASFS) and a major SMOF, co-chairing the 30th World Science Fiction Convention. He also wrote filksongs and was a master costumer.

== Early life ==
Pelz spent most of his childhood in New York State. He earned the rank of Eagle Scout. He went to college in Florida, where he developed an interest in spelunking (initially as an attempt to conquer claustrophobia) and encountered science fiction fandom for the first time.

In 1959 he moved to Los Angeles to study library science at the University of Southern California, and joined LASFS.

== Fan career ==
Pelz served at least two terms as LASFS President ("Director", or later "Procedural Director") and was Treasurer for nearly a decade, shepherding the club to ownership of its own building, an idea originally proposed by Paul Turner. Even after he retired from that position, he remained active on the corporate Board of Directors, serving as Chairman and later as corporate treasurer ("Comptroller"). He was a respected elder statesman of the club until his death in 2002.

Pelz came into fandom before the hobby had speciated, when fans commonly participated in many areas of the hobby. Pelz published general interest fanzines ("genzines") and newszines, assisting Ron Ellik with Starspinkle (1962–1964), then starting his own Ratatosk (1964–1968).

Pelz also became an omniapan, joining all fannish amateur press associations ("APAs"; hence "apans"; hence "omniapans") then in existence — FAPA, SAPS, OMPA, and The Cult, and later two local APAs: APA-F (published weekly at the alternating meetings of the Fanoclasts and FIStFA in New York City) and APA-L (published weekly at LASFS and still ongoing). Even when a special "fractional" issue of APA-L was produced at a LASFS social event (a "Fanquet") without telling him, Pelz arrived with a fanzine to contribute, keeping his unbroken string. The only longer unbroken run of participation in APA-L is that of Fred Patten, who contributed every week until January 22, 2009, for 2280 issues.

Pelz spent a lifetime assembling one of the greatest privately held fanzine collections, which now is part of the J. Lloyd Eaton Collection at the University of California, Riverside.

== Costume ==
Pelz also took part in costume competitions and won several prizes at world and regional conventions, including

- Heavy Trooper (from The Dragon Masters by Jack Vance), Westercon, 1963 and again at Worldcon, 1968
- Fafhrd (with Ted Johnstone as the Gray Mouser and Dian as Ningauble of the Seven Eyes, from Fritz Leiber's Fafhrd and the Gray Mouser stories), Worldcon, 1963
- Gorice of Carce (from The Worm Ouroboros, with his first wife Dian as Lady Sriva), Westercon 1965 and again at Worldcon, 1970.
- The Fat Fury (from Herbie Popnecker comics, with Dian as Ticklepuss), Westercon, 1966
- Chun the Unavoidable (from The Dying Earth by Jack Vance), Worldcon, 1966
- Barquentine (from Titus Groan), Westercon, 1967
- Countess Gertrude (from Titus Groan by Mervyn Peake), Worldcon, 1968
- Nick van Rijn (from Poul Anderson's Polesotechnic League stories), Westercon, 1978

== Other ==
Pelz was also active in filk music in the 1960s and early 1970s. He wrote several classic folksongs, including musical settings for 3 poems from Silverlock by John Myers Myers, and published The Filksong Manual, originally in four slim volumes, later re-issued as a single volume with added material.

In later life, Pelz was best known for his activities in organizing science fiction conventions, sometimes referred to as SMOFFing. He was heavily involved with nearly every convention held in Los Angeles from the mid-60s until his death. Pelz was instrumental in convincing the LASFS to start holding an annual convention, Loscon, and he chaired Loscon X (1983). He co-chaired the 30th World Science Fiction Convention in 1972, with Chuck Crayne. He co-chaired the 1969 Westercon, and served as chair of the 1976 and the 2002 Westercon (his wife Elayne Pelz, also an experienced conrunner, assumed leadership upon his death and the con was held successfully).

He was Fan Guest of Honor of the 38th World Science Fiction Convention in Boston in 1980. Pelz also lent his time and expertise to conventions held in other cities, even outside of North America. His leadership was instrumental in rescuing the ill-fated 1966 Westercon, Westercon XIX, in San Diego. For many years he drove a car with the license plate "SMOF 2".

Pelz also found time for other projects, including the Fantasy Showcase Tarot. He arranged for 78 artists to paint one Tarot card each, and arranged for the deck to be published. It is still available for sale. The project grew to include four non-standard cards, and several of the original artists had to be replaced because the promised paintings were never delivered, so the list of artists eventually grew to nearly 100.

== Death ==
Pelz suffered a pulmonary embolism and died at a Los Angeles area hospital on May 9, 2002.
