= 30th World Science Fiction Convention =

30th Worldcon (1972)

L.A.con I, the 30th World Science Fiction Convention
- Genre: Science fiction
- Dates: 1–4 September 1972
- Venue: International Hotel
- Location: Los Angeles, California
- Country: United States
- Attendance: 2,007
- Filing status: Non-profit

The 30th World Science Fiction Convention (Worldcon), also known as L.A.con I, was held on 1–4 September 1972 at the International Hotel in Los Angeles, California, United States.

The organising committee was co-chaired by Charles Crayne and Bruce Pelz.

== Participants ==
Attendance was approximately 2,007.

=== Guests of honor ===
- Frederik Pohl (pro)
- Buck Coulson and Juanita Coulson (fan)
- Robert Bloch (toastmaster)

== Awards ==
The World Science Fiction Society administers and presents the Hugo Awards, the oldest and most noteworthy award for science fiction. Selection of the recipients is by vote of the Worldcon members. Categories include novels and short fiction, artwork, dramatic presentations, and various professional and fandom activities.

Other awards may be presented at Worldcon at the discretion of the individual convention committee. This has often included the national SF awards of the host country, such as the Japanese Seiun Awards as part of Nippon 2007, and the Prix Aurora Awards as part of Anticipation in 2009. The Astounding Award for Best New Writer and the Sidewise Award, though not sponsored by the Worldcon, are usually presented, as well as the Chesley Awards, the Prometheus Award, and others. In 2021, the Nommo Awards began presenting at Worldcon.

=== 1972 Hugo Awards ===
- Best Novel: To Your Scattered Bodies Go by Philip José Farmer
- Best Novella: The Queen of Air and Darkness by Poul Anderson
- Best Short Story: "Inconstant Moon" by Larry Niven
- Best Dramatic Presentation: A Clockwork Orange
- Best Professional Artist: Frank Kelly Freas
- Best Professional Magazine: Fantasy & Science Fiction
- Best Amateur Magazine: Locus (editors: Charles and Dena Brown)

=== Other awards ===
- Special Award: Harlan Ellison for excellence in anthologizing
- Special Award: Club du Livre d'Anticipation (France) for excellence in book production
- Special Award: Nueva Dimension (Spain) for excellence in magazine production

== Future site selection ==
The 33rd World Science Fiction Convention was awarded to Aussiecon I in Melbourne, Australia. This was the first time a Worldcon was awarded to a site outside North America or Europe.

== Notes ==
At the L.A.Con I masquerade, one of the contestants, artist Scott Shaw!, came on stage wearing only a bathing suit, with his body completely covered with crunchy peanut butter. The name of his costume was "The Turd." from an underground comic story Shaw wrote and illustrated. Since some of the peanut butter tended to drip off of him, making the floor sticky for other contestants, a rule was passed that forever after at science fiction convention masquerades, no peanut butter costumes would be allowed. This masquerade rule is universally known among science fiction fans as the "no peanut butter rule."

The first video game competition at a science fiction convention was held, and a science fiction fan named Kevan Pritchard from Lawndale, California, won the world championship contest in the game Spacewar!.

== See also ==
- Hugo Award
- Science fiction
- Speculative fiction
- World Science Fiction Society
- Worldcon

| Preceded by 29th World Science Fiction Convention; Noreascon I in Boston, Massachusetts, United States (1971) | List of Worldcons; 30th World Science Fiction Convention; L.A.con I in Los Angeles, California, United States (1972) | Succeeded by 31st World Science Fiction Convention; Torcon II in Toronto, Ontario, Canada (1973) |
