= Massachusetts Convention Fandom, Inc =

US non-profit organization

Massachusetts Convention Fandom, Inc.
- Abbreviation: MCFI
- Formation: 1974
- Type: NGO
- Purpose: Educational/Literary
- Location: Boston, Massachusetts, United States
- Region served: New England
- President: Richard Kovalcik (2015-present)
- Website: www.mcfi.org

Massachusetts Convention Fandom, Inc. (MCFI) is an American 501(c)(3) tax-exempt non-profit organization incorporated in 1974 as an administrative vehicle for proposing, promoting, and running World Science Fiction Conventions (Worldcons) and other special (non-ongoing) science fiction conventions in the New England area.

Although MCFI has rented space in the Somerville,_Massachusetts clubhouse of the New England Science Fiction Association (NESFA) for its annual meetings, purchased the "Noreascon" trademark from NESFA, and has overlapping membership with NESFA, the two groups are otherwise separate.

== History ==
Several staffers of the then-recently concluded Noreascon I, the 29th World Science Fiction Convention, met during a July 1974 at a party in Boxborough, Massachusetts, and established MCFI to bid for a Boston Worldcon in 1980.

MCFI's founders needed a new administrative corporation for that purpose because Noreascon I has been run as a one-shot effort, and thus its sponsoring group, Boston in 71, had been dissolved after that event.

=== Worldcons ===
In 1980, WSFS voters having approved MCFI's bid, MCFI ran Noreascon Two, the 38th Worldcon.

In 1989, MCFI ran Noreascon Three, the 47th Worldcon.

In 1997, MCFI bid two possible sites in Orlando, Florida, for the 2001 (59th) Worldcon, and lost to a bid for Philadelphia.

In 2004, MCFI ran Noreascon Four, the 62nd Worldcon.

=== Relaxacon ===
Since 2021 MCFI has hosted an annual Relaxacon on Cape Cod, Massachusetts.

=== Other conventions ===
- SMOFcon 3 in Lowell, Massachusetts, December 5–7, 1986
- SMOFcon 15 in Boston, Massachusetts, December 5–7, 1997
- Ditto 11 in Newport, Rhode Island, November 6–8, 1998
- 25th World Fantasy Convention in Providence, Rhode Island, November 4–7, 1999
- SMOFcon 25 in Boston, Massachusetts, December 7–9, 2007
- SMOFcon 35 in Boston, Massachusetts, December 1–3, 2017
- COSTUME-con 37 in Danvers, Massachusetts, March 22–25, 2019.
- SMOFcon 40 in Providence, Rhode Island, December 1-3, 2023

In 2011, MCFI bid Boston for the 2013 North American Discworld Convention, and lost to Baltimore.

== Outreach ==
The group has published convention materials in various media including digital.

MCFI's charitable and educational work includes supporting the SF Outreach book giveaway at Wondercon in 2011.

== See also ==
- Science fiction fandom
- Science fiction convention
- World Science Fiction Society
