= Fred Patten =

American animation historian (1940–2018)

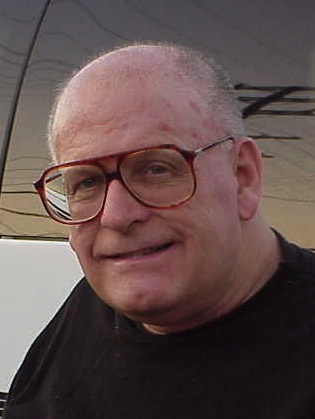
- Born: Frederick Walter Patten; December 11, 1940; Los Angeles, California, U.S.
- Died: November 12, 2018 (aged 77); Los Angeles, California, U.S.
- Occupations: Writer, historian
- Writing career
- Subjects: Science fiction, fantasy, manga, anime, furry fandom

Frederick Walter Patten (December 11, 1940 – November 12, 2018) was an American writer and historian known for his work in the science fiction, fantasy, anime, manga, and furry fandoms, where he gained great distinction through a substantial contribution to both print and online books, magazines, and other media.

== Background ==
Patten was born in Los Angeles on December 11, 1940, to Shirley Marie (Jones) Patten and Beverly Walter Patten. He had two younger sisters: Loel Anne Patten (born 1943) and Sherrill Clare Patten (born 1947). He learned to read at a young age, starting with comic strips in both the Los Angeles Times and Examiner, and later was introduced to Walt Disney's Comics and Stories around 1945. Much of his early reading also came from magazines and books, and he showed an interest in superhero comic books as well.

Science fiction became a key interest around age 9, and Patten began to collect books from Ace Books, Ballantine Books, and other publishers, as well as major science fiction magazines including Astounding, F&SF, and Galaxy Science Fiction. In the late 1950s, he became involved in science-fiction fandom.

Patten entered the University of California at Los Angeles in 1958, and its graduate School of Library Science in 1962. He became active in fandom after discovering the Los Angeles Science Fantasy Society in 1960. By the time he graduated with a master's degree in Library Science in 1963, Patten had been writing for science fiction fanzines and publishing his own stories for three years. His Master's thesis was on the books of Andre Norton.

== Work in anime, fantasy, and science fiction fandoms ==
In 1972, Patten partnered with Richard Kyle to create Graphic Story Bookshop in Long Beach, California. In an interview posted on the now defunct website of Pulp, Patten said he had discovered manga at Westercon, one of the largest science fiction conventions on the West Coast, in 1970. At the time, he had been aware of television shows like Astro Boy, but had no idea then that they were Japanese.

Through his bookshop, Patten wrote to Japanese publishers, asking to import their manga, achieving some success and in the process becoming a pioneer in the anime and manga fandom. He was one of the founders of the Cartoon/Fantasy Organization, the first American anime fan club, in 1977.

During this time, Patten worked in numerous library positions, notably that of technical catalogue librarian at Hughes Aircraft Company's Company Technical Document Center (CTDC), in El Segundo, Calif., from 1969 to 1990. After leaving that position, he served from 1991 to 2002 as the first employee of Streamline Pictures, one of America's pioneering anime specialty production companies, founded by Carl Macek and Jerry Beck in 1988. He has been a presenter at major conventions and guest lecturer at universities in the U.S. and Australia.

Patten wrote numerous monthly columns and individual articles for Animation World Magazine, Newtype U.S.A., the Comics Buyer's Guide, and other magazines, including serving as the Official Editor for the Rowrbrazzle Amateur Press Association, until March 2005, when he suffered a stroke.

No longer able to keep his collection, which had grown over more than 40 years, Patten donated everything – almost 900 boxes (~220,000 items) of comic books, records, tapes, anime, manga, programs from science-fiction conventions dating back to the 1930s, convention T-shirts, paperbacks, and an array of sci-fi fanzines back to the 1930s – to the J. Lloyd Eaton Collection at the University of California, Riverside, which houses the world's largest collection of science fiction, fantasy and horror.

== Death ==
Patten died on November 12, 2018, at the age of 77.

== Bibliography ==
As author

- Watching Anime, Reading Manga: 25 Years of Essays and Reviews (2004) ISBN 9781880656921
- Funny Animals and More: From Anime to Zoomorphics
- Furry Fandom Conventions, 1989–2015 (McFarland, 2017) ISBN 9781476663814

As editor

- Best in Show: Fifteen Years of Outstanding Furry Fiction
- Already Among Us; An Anthropomorphic Anthology
- The Ursa Major Awards Anthology; A Tenth Anniversary Celebration
- What Happens Next; An Anthology of Sequels
- Five Fortunes
- Anthropomorphic Aliens; An Interstellar Anthology
- The Furry Future: 19 Possible Prognostications
- An Anthropomorphic Century: Stories from 1909 to 2008
- "Cats and More Cats: Feline Fantasy Fiction"
- "Gods with Fur: And Feathers, Scales, ..."
- "Dogs of War"
- "Symbol of a Nation"
- "Dogs of War II: Aftermath"
- "What the Fox?!"
- "Exploring New Places"

As contributor

- Animation Art: From Pencil to Pixel, the History of Cartoon, Anime & CGI, edited by Jerry Beck.
- The Animated Movie Guide: The Ultimate Illustrated Reference to Cartoon, Stop-Motion, and Computer-Generated Feature Films, edited by Jerry Beck.

=== Comic books ===
Stories by Fred Patten have appeared in comics including Mangazine, The Ever-Changing Palace, Albedo Anthropomorphics, and Furrlough (which included the series "Theriopangrams", in 36 issues between 1997 and 2003).

Patten adapted into English volumes 2–7 of The Skull Man by Kazuhiko Shimamoto; created by Shotaro Ishinomori.

== Filmography ==
=== Anime staff ===
Tekkaman: The Space Knight, (1984, TV) – Writer/adapter
Robot Carnival (1991) – Publicity
Fist of the North Star (1991) – Publicity
Vampire Hunter D (1992) – Marketing and Promotion
The Castle of Cagliostro (1992) – Translation
Nadia (1992–1993, TV) – Story Editor
Neo-Tokyo 2099 (1993, featurette) – Unit Publicist
Silent Mobius (1993, featurette) – Unit Publicist
Golgo 13: The Professional(1993, featurette) – Unit Publicist
Wicked City (1993) – Unit Publicist
Lupin III: Tales of the Wolf (1993–1994, TV) – Story Editor
Crying Freeman (1993–1995, featurette) – Publicity
Doomed Megalopolis (1993–1994, featurettes) – Story Editor
Dirty Pair: Project Eden (1994) – Story Editor
Dirty Pair: Flight 005 Conspiracy (1994) – Story Editor
8 Man After (1994, featurettes) – Script Editor
Lily-C.A.T. (1994) – Publicity
8 Man (1995, live-action) – Script Editor
Lupin III: The Mystery of Mamo (1995) – Story Editor
Crimson Wolf (1995) – Story Editor
Babel II (1995, featurette) – Story Editor
Casshan, Robot Hunter (1995, featurettes) – Story Editor
Barefoot Gen (feature, 1995) – Story Editor
Megazone 23, Part 1 (1995) – Story Editor

== Accolades ==
- Evans-Freehafer Award, 1965 – presented annually by the Los Angeles Science Fantasy Society, Inc., for service to the Society.
- Sampo Award, 1971 – presented annually at the West Coast Science Fantasy Conference (Westercon) for "unsung" services to s-f fandom
- Inkpot Award, 1980 – presented annually at San Diego Comic-Con in various categories; "For Outstanding Achievement in Fandom Services/Projects".
- Ursa Major Awards, 2003 ("The Annual Anthropomorphic Literature and Arts Awards") – presented annually at an anthropomorphic convention in various categories; to Best in Show: Fifteen Years of Outstanding Furry Fiction, edited by Fred Patten (Sofawolf Press, July 2003); for "Best Anthropomorphic Other Literary Work of 2003".
- Life Achievement Award, 64th World Science Fiction Convention (LA Con IV; 2006) – awarded in recognition of a lifetime of service to the fandom.
- Forry Award, 2009 – presented annually at the Los Angeles Regional Science Fiction and Fantasy Convention (LosCon) "for lifetime achievement in the field of science fiction".
- Furry Hall of Fame, 2012 – inducted annually at the MiDFur convention in Melbourne, Australia, for a lifetime of service to the Furry fandom.
