= Rowrbrazzle =

Magazine

Rowrbrazzle is an Amateur Press Association magazine devoted to funny animal cartoon illustration.

== History ==
Rowrbrazzle was founded in 1983 by Marc Schirmeister, who published the first issue in February 1984, and was editor for the first nineteen quarterly mailings. Fred Patten was then editor from January 1989 (Issue 20) through January 2005 until suffering a stroke and retiring after Issue 84. Edd Vick became Official Editor from April 2005 (Issue 85) to April 2007 (Issue 93), William Earl Haskell became Official Editor from Issue 94 (July 2007) to January 2016 (Issue 128) when he was forced to retire due to poor health, and Edd Vick became Official Editor again from April 2016 (Issue 129).

The first Rowrbrazzle was distributed to the association membership in February 1984.

Landmark issue number 150 was distributed in July 2021, in a continuing uninterrupted run of 37 1/2 years.

== Significance ==
Fred Patten, onetime editor of Rowrbrazzle, had this view of Rowrbrazzle's significance:

"My thesis is that furry fandom coalesced out of sf fandom and comics fandom, blending elements from both of them and achieving its own critical mass in 1983/1984. The first clear signs of the independent furry fandom were the creation of its first APA, Rowrbrazzle, and the decision by some fans to self-publish furry comic books because there seemed to be enough fans of stories with talking animals to support them (as distinct from earlier attempts to self-publish comics which had to hope for sufficient sales from the public alone.)
"...
"Rowrbrazzle started in February 1984. Since it was specifically an APA for writing and drawing funny animals as a genre and discussing the new fandom that was forming about them, it is a handy landmark to say that 'furry fandom existed at this time.'"
