= Walter Gordon (soldier, born 1920) =

American military officer in the 101st Airborne (1920–1997)

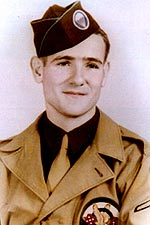
- Born: Walter Scott Gordon Jr. 15 April 1920; Jackson, Mississippi, US
- Died: 19 April 1997 (aged 77); Biloxi, Mississippi, US
- Military career
- Allegiance: United States
- Branch: United States Army
- Service years: 1942–1945
- Rank: Corporal
- Nickname: Smokey
- Units: Easy Company, 2nd Battalion, 506th Parachute Infantry Regiment, 101st Airborne Division
- Conflicts: World War II: Battle of Normandy; Operation Market Garden; Battle of the Bulge
- Awards: Purple Heart
- Other work: Oil and gas lease broker

Walter Scott Gordon Jr. (15 April 1920 – 19 April 1997) was a non-commissioned officer with Easy Company, 2nd Battalion, 506th Parachute Infantry Regiment, in the 101st Airborne Division of the United States Army during World War II.

Gordon was portrayed in the HBO miniseries Band of Brothers by Ben Caplan. He was featured in the 2010 book A Company of Heroes: Personal Memories about the Real Band of Brothers and the Legacy They Left Us.

== Youth ==
Walter Scott "Smokey" Gordon was born in Jackson, Mississippi. He enrolled at Millsaps College around 1940, attending there for 2 years.

Due to colorblindness and flat feet, the Marines and the Navy had rejected him, so he joined the Army. Gordon enlisted on 10 August 1942 in Philadelphia, Pennsylvania, as his father told him that 'if you enlist down south, you will train up north and vice versa'. He faked his way through the eye test and successfully enlisted.

== Military service ==
Gordon's basic training was at Camp Lejeune in North Carolina. His airborne training began in August 1942 at Camp Toccoa, Georgia under Herbert Sobel. Gordon's nickname 'Smokey' came from his tobacco-chewing habit during his time with Easy Company. During training, Gordon found that he needed more water than others, therefore in the field he began carrying extra Hershey's bars as a way to gain access to his comrades' canteens. Gordon and Paul Rogers loved composing poems to tease their comrades that had experienced some kind of mishap, and the victims would often explode in anger to their delight.

Gordon had served with Easy Company as a machine gunner. He jumped into Normandy in the early morning hours of 6 June 1944 and landed on a farm. He found other unit members shortly after. One week later, on 13 June, he was wounded in the arm and shoulder at Carentan, France. In the hospital, different groups of military upper brass visited the wounded soldiers and pinned Purple Hearts on the men's pillows. Gordon received his, but he unpinned and hid it, so when the next group came, they would give him another Purple Heart. After a while, Gordon had several medals. Gordon spent 8 weeks in the hospital and returned to Easy Company. Darrell "Shifty" Powers recalled one time Gordon gave his last cigarette to Talbert, but charged him a dime for a match. When Gordon found out that Talbert was disqualified from receiving a Purple Heart for a wound received when Tab was mistakenly bayoneted by another Easy Company trooper, he put together a makeshift ceremony with Paul Rogers and gave Talbert one of his extra Purple Hearts. They also wrote the poem The Night of the Bayonet for the incident.

In September 1944, he jumped in the failed mission of Operation Market Garden in the Netherlands. Smokey also fought in Bastogne, Belgium in December 1944. Major Richard D. Winters remembered seeing Gordon sitting on the edge of his foxhole behind his light machine gun, his head wrapped in a large towel with his helmet on top. Winters did not recognize Gordon at first, and was struck knowing that it was him. He thought "Damn! Gordon's matured! He's a man!" On Christmas Eve, Gordon was shot by a German sniper, with the bullet penetrating one shoulder, traveling through his body and exiting the shoulder on the other side, which paralyzed him. He was evacuated from the front lines on 27 December when Patton's Third Army penetrated the German lines and marched into Bastogne. In the process of recovery, Gordon was hospitalized for six months.

== Later years ==
In spring 1945, Gordon was sent back to the States and to Lawson General Hospital. One day when he was recuperating, a doctor named Dr. Stadium turned to the nurse and said, "Keep an eye on this one, he's goldbricking." Gordon was infuriated, and only later he realized that the doctor was trying to rile him up to help reconnect nerves and keep a fighting spirit in him. He remained in touch with Dr. Stadium for years after the war. The Army decided not to release Gordon, although he was improving, possibly because they might have to pay Gordon for a full disability if they released him at that point. Gordon was discharged from the Army with a 90% disability after his father threatened to "drive him down to the US Capitol Building, march him down onto the Senate floor, strip him down to his skivvies and let someone besides the Army make a determination."

Gordon eventually fully regained all bodily movements but would suffer from severe back pain for the remainder of his life.

Gordon later moved to Lafayette, Louisiana, where he became employed as an independent oil and gas lease broker. In 1946, he and others began organizing Easy Company reunions. In 1951, he married Elizabeth Ball Ludeau and the couple had one son and 4 daughters. Gordon was a faithful Episcopalian, but stopped being so after his beloved twin sister Cleta died in her early thirties of breast cancer.

Gordon died in Pass Christian, Mississippi after suffering a stroke in his sleep. He was survived by his five children including his eldest, Walter S. Gordon III, and his 5 grandchildren: Bonnie Gordon, Alison Gordon, Cherie Goff, Charles Goff and Shelby Gordon.

== Bibliography ==
- Ambrose, Stephen E. (1992). Band of Brothers: Easy Company, 506th Regiment, 101st Airborne from Normandy to Hitler's Eagle's Nest. Simon & Schuster. ISBN 978-0-7434-6411-6.
- Winters, Richard D.; Cole C. Kingseed (2006). Beyond Band of Brothers: The War Memoirs of Major Dick Winters. St. Martin's Press. ISBN 0-425-20813-3.
- Brotherton, Marcus (2010). A Company of Heroes: Personal Memories about the Real Band of Brothers and the Legacy They Left Us. Berkley Caliber. ISBN 978-0-425-23420-4.
