= The Winner Twins =

American novelist

Brianna and Brittany Winner
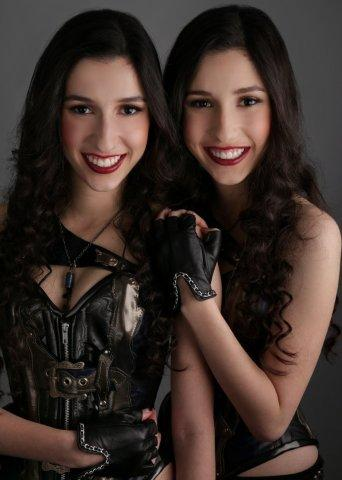
- Born: c. 1995
- Occupation: Authors
- Writing career
- Pen name: J.B.B. Winner, Winner Twins
- Genre: Science Fiction
- Notable work: The Strand Prophecy
- Website: www.thewinnertwins.com

Brittany and Brianna Winner, also known as the Winner Twins (born 1995), are science fiction authors known for their self-published novels.

== Biography ==
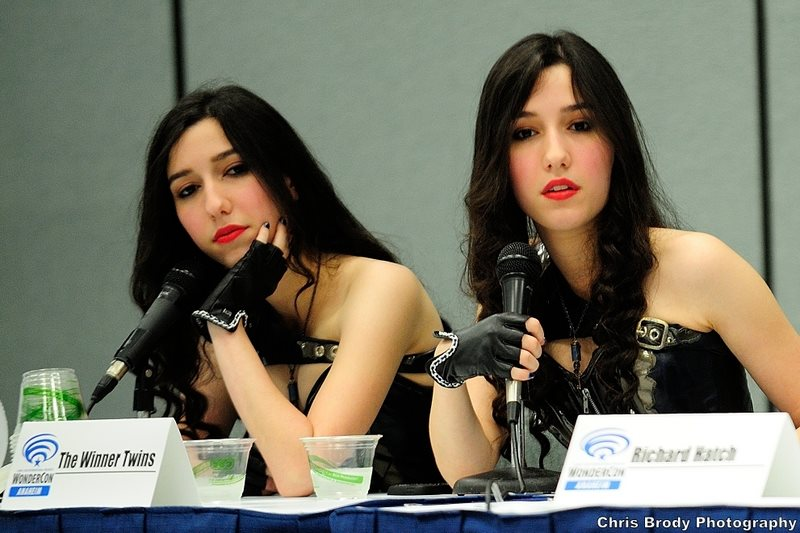
On a 2014 Wonder Con panel

Brianna and Brittany were born in 1995, and began writing in middle school with their father, under the pen name J.B.B. Winner. They published their first novel,The Strand Prophecy, when they were 12, and it attracted national attention the following year. It was an illustrated story about a rapid evolutionary cycle on Earth, with a scientist superhero as the lead character.

In 2018, they began collaborating with Todd McCaffrey, publishing the Twin Soul series and the novel The Magpie's War.

The twins developed dyslexia and dysgraphia early in life, and promote youth literacy and education to inspire children with learning disabilities.

== Publications ==
=== Novels ===
- The Strand Prophecy (2006) (Missile Rider Publishing)
- Extinction's Embrace (2009) (Howler Publishing)
- Perfect Compatibility Test (2017)
- Twin Soul Series 2018-2021 (series of 20 short stories, with Todd McCaffrey)
- The Magpie's War (2021) (with Todd McCaffrey)

=== Non-fiction ===
- The Write Path: Navigating Storytelling (2017*)
- Millennium Madness poetry anthology (Brianna Winner, 2019)

== Reception ==
Their first novel The Strand Prophecy was a semi-finalist for an Independent Publishers Book Award, nominated for an IBPA Benjamin Franklin Award, and was inducted into the National Accelerated Reader Program.

They received Pinnacle Awards for excellence in teaching from the Center for Interactive Learning and Collaboration (CILC) in 2012, 2013 and 2014. They contributed essays on creative writing to the 2014 Penguin Books anthology Now Write! Science Fiction, Fantasy and Horror.

They were featured presenters at the first annual Geekie Awards in August, 2013, and special guests of honor at BayCon 2015's Women of Wonder.

As of 2021, their books had reportedly sold hundreds of thousands of copies.
