= 38th World Science Fiction Convention =

38th Worldcon (1980)

Noreascon Two, the 38th World Science Fiction Convention
- Genre: Science fiction
- Dates: 29 August–1 September 1980
- Venue: Sheraton-Boston Hotel and Hynes Civic Auditorium
- Location: Boston, Massachusetts
- Country: United States
- Attendance: ~5,850
- Organizer: Massachusetts Convention Fandom, Inc.
- Filing status: non-profit

The 38th World Science Fiction Convention (Worldcon), also known as Noreascon Two, was held on 29 August–1 September 1980 at the Sheraton-Boston Hotel and Hynes Civic Auditorium in Boston, Massachusetts, United States.

The chairman was Leslie Turek. The supporting organization was Massachusetts Convention Fandom, Inc.

== Participants ==
Attendance was approximately 5,850.

=== Guests of honor ===
- Damon Knight (pro)
- Kate Wilhelm (pro)
- Bruce Pelz (fan)
- Robert Silverberg (toastmaster)

== Awards ==
The World Science Fiction Society administers and presents the Hugo Awards, the oldest and most noteworthy award for science fiction. Selection of the recipients is by vote of the Worldcon members. Categories include novels and short fiction, artwork, dramatic presentations, and various professional and fandom activities.

Other awards may be presented at Worldcon at the discretion of the individual convention committee. This has often included the national SF awards of the host country, such as the Japanese Seiun Awards as part of Nippon 2007, and the Prix Aurora Awards as part of Anticipation in 2009. The Astounding Award for Best New Writer and the Sidewise Award, though not sponsored by the Worldcon, are usually presented, as well as the Chesley Awards, the Prometheus Award, and others. In 2021, the Nommo Awards began presenting at Worldcon.

=== 1980 Hugo Awards ===
- Best Novel: The Fountains of Paradise by Arthur C. Clarke
- Best Novella: "Enemy Mine" by Barry B. Longyear
- Best Novelette: "Sandkings" by George R. R. Martin
- Best Short Story: "The Way of Cross and Dragon" by George R. R. Martin
- Best Non-Fiction Book: The Encyclopedia of Science Fiction, edited by Peter Nicholls
- Best Dramatic Presentation: Alien
- Best Professional Editor: George H. Scithers
- Best Professional Artist: Michael Whelan
- Best Fanzine: Locus, edited by Charles N. Brown
- Best Fan Writer: Bob Shaw
- Best Fan Artist: Alexis Gilliland

=== Other awards ===
- John W. Campbell Award for Best New Writer: Barry B. Longyear
- Gandalf Grand Master Award: Ray Bradbury

== See also ==
- Hugo Award
- Science fiction
- Speculative fiction
- World Science Fiction Society
- Worldcon

Preceded by 37th World Science Fiction Convention; Seacon '79 in Brighton, UK (1979)	List of Worldcons; 38th World Science Fiction Convention; Noreascon Two in Boston, Massachusetts, United States (1980)	Succeeded by 39th World Science Fiction Convention; Denvention II in Denver, Colorado, United States (1981)
