= 28th World Science Fiction Convention =

28th Worldcon (1970)

Heicon '70, the 28th World Science Fiction Convention
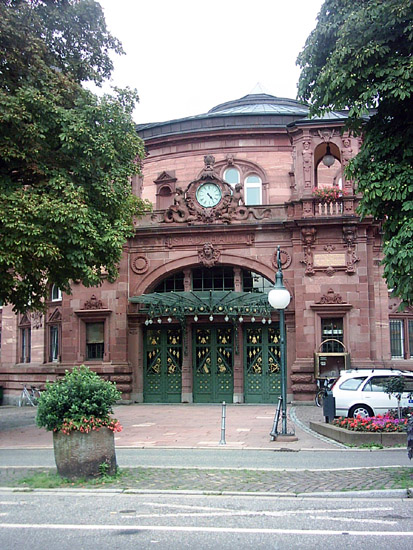
- The venue for the event, the Heidelberg Stadthalle
- Genre: Science fiction
- Dates: 20–24 August 1970
- Venue: Stadthalle Heidelberg
- Location: Heidelberg
- Country: West Germany
- Attendance: ~620
- Filing status: non-profit

The 28th World Science Fiction Convention (Worldcon), also known as Heicon '70, was held on 20–24 August 1970 at the Stadthalle Heidelberg in Heidelberg, West Germany.

Manfred Kage eventually became Heicon's convention chairman, the last of more than a dozen fans who briefly held the position during the convention's rocky organizational period.

== Participants ==
Attendance was approximately 620.

=== Guests of honor ===
- E. C. Tubb (UK) (pro)
- Robert Silverberg (US) (pro)
- Herbert W. Franke (Germany) (pro)
- Elliot K. Shorter (fan), the 1970 TAFF winner
- John Brunner (toastmaster)

== Awards ==
The World Science Fiction Society administers and presents the Hugo Awards, the oldest and most noteworthy award for science fiction. Selection of the recipients is by vote of the Worldcon members. Categories include novels and short fiction, artwork, dramatic presentations, and various professional and fandom activities.

Other awards may be presented at Worldcon at the discretion of the individual convention committee. This has often included the national SF awards of the host country, such as the Japanese Seiun Awards as part of Nippon 2007, and the Prix Aurora Awards as part of Anticipation in 2009. The Astounding Award for Best New Writer and the Sidewise Award, though not sponsored by the Worldcon, are usually presented, as well as the Chesley Awards, the Prometheus Award, and others. In 2021, the Nommo Awards began presenting at Worldcon.

=== 1970 Hugo Awards ===
- Best Novel: The Left Hand of Darkness by Ursula K. Le Guin
- Best Novella: "Ship of Shadows" by Fritz Leiber
- Best Short Story: "Time Considered as a Helix of Semi-Precious Stones" by Samuel R. Delany
- Best Dramatic Presentation: News coverage of Apollo 11
- Best Professional Magazine: Fantasy & Science Fiction
- Best Professional Artist: Frank Kelly Freas
- Best Fanzine: Science Fiction Review, edited by Richard E. Geis
- Best Fan Writer: Bob Tucker
- Best Fan Artist: Tim Kirk

== See also ==
- Hugo Award
- Science fiction
- Speculative fiction
- World Science Fiction Society
- Worldcon

Preceded by 27th World Science Fiction Convention; St. Louiscon in St. Louis, Missouri, United States (1969)	List of Worldcons; 28th World Science Fiction Convention; Heicon '70 in Heidelberg, Germany (1970)	Succeeded by 29th World Science Fiction Convention; Noreascon I in Boston, Massachusetts, United States (1971)
