= 27th World Science Fiction Convention =

27th Worldcon (1969)

St. Louiscon, the 27th World Science Fiction Convention
- Genre: Science fiction
- Dates: 28 August–1 September 1969
- Venue: Chase Park Plaza Hotel
- Location: St. Louis, Missouri
- Country: United States
- Attendance: 1,534
- Organizer: Ozark Science Fiction Association
- Filing status: non-profit

The 27th World Science Fiction Convention (Worldcon), also known as St. Louiscon, was held on 28 August–1 September 1969 at the Chase Park Plaza Hotel in St. Louis, Missouri, United States.

The chairpersons were Ray Fisher and Joyce Fisher. The supporting organization was OSFA, the Ozark Science Fiction Association.

== Participants ==
Attendance was 1,534, out of over 2,000 paid memberships.

=== Guests of honor ===
- Jack Gaughan (pro)
- Eddie Jones (fan artist); also as the TAFF winner, replaced Ted White
- Harlan Ellison (toastmaster)

== Awards ==
The World Science Fiction Society administers and presents the Hugo Awards, the oldest and most noteworthy award for science fiction. Selection of the recipients is by vote of the Worldcon members. Categories include novels and short fiction, artwork, dramatic presentations, and various professional and fandom activities.

Other awards may be presented at Worldcon at the discretion of the individual convention committee. This has often included the national SF awards of the host country, such as the Japanese Seiun Awards as part of Nippon 2007, and the Prix Aurora Awards as part of Anticipation in 2009. The Astounding Award for Best New Writer and the Sidewise Award, though not sponsored by the Worldcon, are usually presented, as well as the Chesley Awards, the Prometheus Award, and others. In 2021, the Nommo Awards began presenting at Worldcon.

=== 1969 Hugo Awards ===
- Best Novel: Stand on Zanzibar by John Brunner
- Best Novella: "Nightwings" by Robert Silverberg
- Best Novelette: "The Sharing of Flesh" by Poul Anderson
- Best Short Story: "The Beast That Shouted Love at the Heart of the World" by Harlan Ellison
- Best Dramatic Presentation: 2001: A Space Odyssey
- Best Professional Artist: Jack Gaughan
- Best Professional Magazine: Fantasy & Science Fiction
- Best Fanzine: Science Fiction Review, edited by Richard E. Geis
- Best Fan Artist: Vaughn Bodé
- Best Fan Writer: Harry Warner, Jr.

=== Other awards ===
- Special Award: Neil Armstrong, Edwin Aldrin, and Michael Collins for "The Best Moon Landing Ever"

== See also ==
- Hugo Award
- Science fiction
- Speculative fiction
- World Science Fiction Society
- Worldcon

Preceded by 26th World Science Fiction Convention; Baycon in Berkeley, California, United States (1968)	List of Worldcons; 27th World Science Fiction Convention; St. Louiscon in St. Louis, Missouri, United States (1969)	Succeeded by 28th World Science Fiction Convention; Heicon '70 in Heidelberg, Germany (1970)
