= 62nd World Science Fiction Convention =

62nd Worldcon (2004)

Noreascon 4, the 62nd World Science Fiction Convention
- "Lensman Family" logo for Noreascon 4
- Genre: Science fiction
- Dates: 2–6 September 2004
- Venue: Hynes Convention Center
- Location: Boston, Massachusetts
- Country: United States
- Attendance: 6,008
- Organizer: Massachusetts Convention Fandom, Inc.
- Filing status: 501(c)(3) non-profit
- Website: noreascon.org

The 62nd World Science Fiction Convention (Worldcon), also known as Noreascon 4, was held on 2–6 September 2004 at the Hynes Convention Center, Sheraton Boston Hotel and Boston Marriott Copley Place in Boston, Massachusetts, United States.

The convention was organized by Massachusetts Convention Fandom, Inc., and the organizing committee was chaired by Deb Geisler.

== Participants ==
Attendance was 6,008, out of 7,485 paid memberships.

=== Guests of honor ===
- Terry Pratchett (pro)
- William Tenn (pro)
- Jack Speer (fan)
- Peter Weston (fan)

=== Other participating writers ===
In addition to the guests of honor, notable science fiction writers participating to the convention included:

- Brian Aldiss
- Kevin J. Anderson
- Lois McMaster Bujold
- Jack L. Chalker
- John Clute
- Neil Gaiman
- Elizabeth Hand
- Harry Harrison
- George R.R. Martin
- Larry Niven
- Robert Sheckley
- Robert Silverberg
- Michael Swanwick
- Harry Turtledove
- Connie Willis

== Awards ==
The World Science Fiction Society administers and presents the Hugo Awards, the oldest and most noteworthy award for science fiction. Selection of the recipients is by vote of the Worldcon members. Categories include novels and short fiction, artwork, dramatic presentations, and various professional and fandom activities.

Other awards may be presented at Worldcon at the discretion of the individual convention committee. This has often included the national SF awards of the host country, such as the Japanese Seiun Awards as part of Nippon 2007, and the Prix Aurora Awards as part of Anticipation in 2009. The Astounding Award for Best New Writer and the Sidewise Award, though not sponsored by the Worldcon, are usually presented, as well as the Chesley Awards, the Prometheus Award, and others. In 2021, the Nommo Awards began presenting at Worldcon.

=== 2004 Hugo Awards ===
- Best Novel: Paladin of Souls, by Lois McMaster Bujold
- Best Novella: "The Cookie Monster," by Vernor Vinge
- Best Novelette: "Legions in Time," by Michael Swanwick
- Best Short Story: "A Study in Emerald," by Neil Gaiman
- Best Related Book: The Chesley Awards for Science Fiction and Fantasy Art: A Retrospective, by John Grant, Elizabeth L. Humphrey, and Pamela D. Scoville
- Best Professional Editor: Gardner Dozois
- Best Professional Artist: Bob Eggleton
- Best Dramatic Presentation, Long Form: The Lord of the Rings: The Return of the King
- Best Dramatic Presentation, Short Form: Gollum’s Acceptance Speech at the 2003 MTV Movie Awards
- Best Semiprozine: Locus, edited by Charles N. Brown, Jennifer A. Hall, and Kirsten Gong-Wong
- Best Fanzine: Emerald City, edited by Cheryl Morgan
- Best Fan Writer: Dave Langford
- Best Fan Artist: Frank Wu

=== 1954 Retro Hugo Awards ===
- Best Novel: Fahrenheit 451, by Ray Bradbury
- Best Novella: "A Case of Conscience," by James Blish
- Best Novelette: "Earthman, Come Home," by James Blish
- Best Short Story: "The Nine Billion Names of God," by Arthur C. Clarke
- Best Related Book: Conquest of the Moon, by Wernher von Braun, Fred L. Whipple & Willy Ley
- Best Professional Editor: John W. Campbell, Jr.
- Best Professional Artist: Chesley Bonestell
- Best Dramatic Presentation: The War of the Worlds
- Best Fanzine: Slant, Walt Willis, editor; James White, art editor
- Best Fan Writer: Bob Tucker

=== Other awards ===
- John W. Campbell Award for Best New Writer: Jay Lake
- Special Noreascon Four Committee Award: Erwin "Filthy Pierre" Strauss

== Future site selection ==
The 65th World Science Fiction Convention was awarded to Nippon 2007 in the city of Yokohama, Japan. The convention was the first to be held in Asia.

== See also ==
- Hugo Award
- Science fiction
- Speculative fiction
- World Science Fiction Society
- Worldcon

Preceded by 61st World Science Fiction Convention; Torcon 3 in Toronto, Ontario, Canada (2003)	List of Worldcons; 62nd World Science Fiction Convention; Noreascon 4 in Boston, Massachusetts, United States (2004)	Succeeded by 63rd World Science Fiction Convention; Interaction in Glasgow, UK (2005)
