= Library Bards =

American nerd parody band

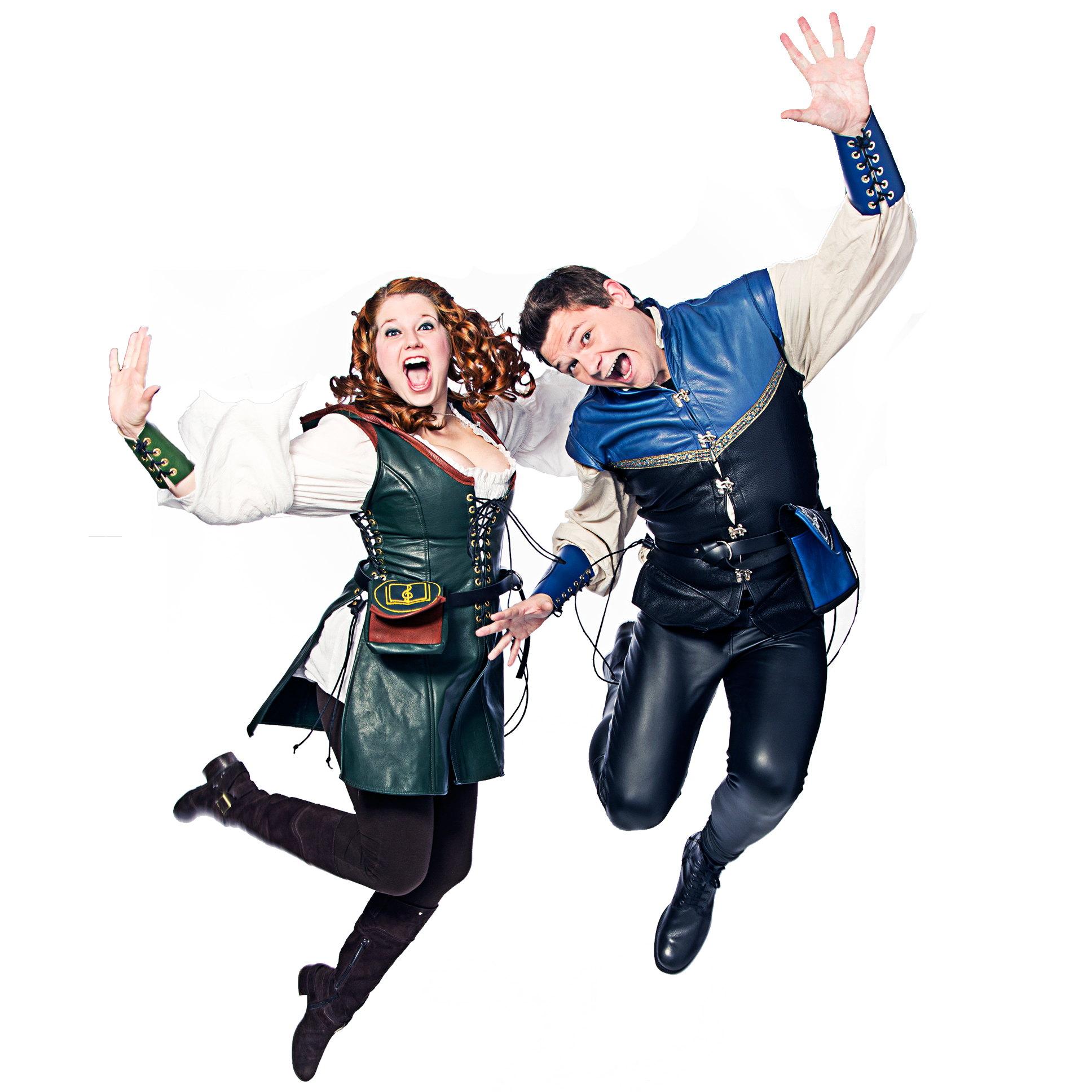

Background information
- Origin: Los Angeles, California, United States
- Genres: Nerd Parody, Comedy, Singer-Songwriter
- Instruments: Orchestra, electronic
- Years active: 2014–present
- Label: DFTBA Records
- Members: Bonnie Gordon; Xander Jeanneret
- Website: librarybards.com

Library Bards are a nerd parody band based in Los Angeles, California, consisting of reality personalities Bonnie Gordon (ABC's The Quest) and Xander Jeanneret (TBS' King of the Nerds). They are known for taking pop songs and re-writing them as nerd-centric parody songs. Topics of their songs include Sci-Fi, Cosplay, Gaming, and Fantasy.

== History ==
Xander and Bonnie had known each other before being cast on their respective reality competition shows. Both had gone on to become the "fan-favorites" of their shows, and wanted to continue performing at comic and pop culture conventions. Their first song "Gandalf" (a parody of Taylor Swift's "Shake it Off") was created in collaboration with the fan site theonering.net, and debuted before the final installment of the Hobbit films. The song debuted as #1 in the comedy genre in Los Angeles on the music website Reverbnation, #2 nationally, and #3 globally in December 2014. The Library Bards continue to hold a top spot in the Comedy genre in Los Angeles.

== Music ==
Both Bonnie and Xander collaborate on writing the lyrics to each of their songs, and they employ a third party to create the backing tracks for the music. Past collaborators have included Jake Kaufman, Bonecage, Breakmaster Cylinder, and Ben and Michael McGeehee.

=== Nerd Parody Music ===
The Library Bards consider themselves a "Nerd Parody Band", which focuses on topics and "fandoms" that are generally considered nerdy or geeky. Some have placed them in the category of Filk music, and the Library Bards work within that category as well. They have been featured on the comedy music Dr. Demento show and on The FuMP.

== Touring ==
=== Amazing! Tour (2015) ===
The Library Bards started touring Comic and Pop Culture conventions in 2015, including the Amazing! Comic Con series. The list of cities included:

- Los Angeles, CA
- Indianapolis, IN
- Ventura, CA
- Houston, TX
- Honolulu, HI
- San Francisco, CA
- Oklahoma City, OK

=== Level Up! Tour (2016) ===
The Library Bards continued to tour over 50 comic and pop culture conventions in 2016, including:

- WonderCon (LA)
- Pasadena Comic Con (Pasadena)
- Orlando, FL Concert
- Anime Fan Fest (New Jersey)
- Amazing! Hawaii Comic Con
- BayCon (San Francisco)
- Ninja-Con (LA)
- LA CosplayCon
- Amazing! Las Vegas Comic Con
- Anime Expo (LA)
- San Diego Comic Con
- Wizard World Chicago
- FuMPFest (Chicago)
- Amazing Houston Comic Con
- NerdBot Con
- Santa Clarita Valley Comic Con
- Louisiana Comic Con (Lafayette)
- LosCon

=== BARDCORE Tour (2017) ===
The Library Bards toured for their first full studio album, BARDCORE, bringing their high energy performances to the stages across the country, including:

- The Pack Theater (Los Angeles)
- Long Beach Comic Expo
- MarsCon (Minneapolis)
- Tulare Sci-Fi Con (Tulare)
- LouisiAnime (Baton Rouge)
- FantasticKon (Santa Clarita, CA)
- BurlyQuest (Los Angeles)
- WonderCon (Los Angeles)
- WhedonCon (Los Angeles)
- WyrdCon (Los Angeles)
- BayCon (San Mateo)
- FuMPFest (Chicago)
- Amazing Las Vegas Comic Con
- Anime Expo (Los Angeles)
- San Diego Comic Con
- Amazing Hawaii Comic Con
- Quest-Con (Mobile, AL)
- Game-A-Con (Las Vegas)
- Van Nuys Comedy Club (Los Angeles)
- Long Beach Comic Con
- LosCon (Los Angeles)

== Discography ==
=== Studio albums ===
- BARDCORE (March 2017)
- BomBARDed (10 September 2019)

=== EPs ===
- Library Bards EP (CD only, July 2016)

=== Compilation albums ===
- The FuMP Vol. 55 – "Gandalf" (January–February 2016)
- The FuMP Vol. 59 – "Warriors for Hire" (September–October 2016)
- FuMPFest 2016 – Live! (CD & Online, January 2017)

=== Music videos ===
The Library Bards have released several music videos for their songs. Most popular is the music video for "Gandalf", which was in collaboration with the Lord of the Rings Fansite theonering.net. Typical Library Bards music videos feature popular cosplayers in the nerd community, as well as appearances by voice actors and other talent.

| Year | Title |
|---|---|
| 2014 | Gandalf |
| 2015 | Black and Red |
| 2015 | Grammar Got Run Over Once Again, Dear |
| 2016 | Warriors For Hire |
| 2016 | Pokeball |
| 2017 | Geeky Girl |
| 2017 | Now You Have The Bridge, Spock |
| 2017 | Finn and Poe |
| 2019 | Comic Fan |
| 2020 | DND |

== Television and media appearances ==
Bonnie Gordon appeared on ABC's The Quest and Xander Jeanneret was a finalist on TBS' King of the Nerds Season 2. Since these appearances, the Library Bards can be seen as a pair on CBS' Celebrity Name Game twice in 2016, and Bonnie Gordon appeared on SyFy's Geeks Who Drink. The Library Bards also appear on the LGBTQ Streaming application REVRY

Bonnie Gordon is also a voice actress for the English version of Street Fighter V, providing the voice of the character R. Mika Gordon provides the voice of the Narwhal Magisword, Dolphin-Chan and one of the Barnacles in Cartoon Network's Mighty Magiswords episode "Unconventional Dolphism", created by The FuMP member Kyle A. Carrozza with FuMP member Luke Ski as storyboard artist, writer and voice actor. Gordon reprised her roles as the Narwhal Magisword, as well as the character Nana Mewfles in the episode "For the Love of Narwhal". Gordon and Jeanneret previously did a cover parody of the song "We Didn't Start the Fire" based on the series, titled "Warriors for Hire!".

Xander Jeanneret is a voice actor for the independent fighting game Divekick, providing the voice of the Announcer.

The Library Bards provided a musical trailer for the Geek and Sundry streaming show Callisto 6, in which Gordon plays main cast character Lindy "Hopps" Hopper and Jeanneret plays recurring cast character Cobalt.
