= Bonnie Gordon =

American actress and parody musician

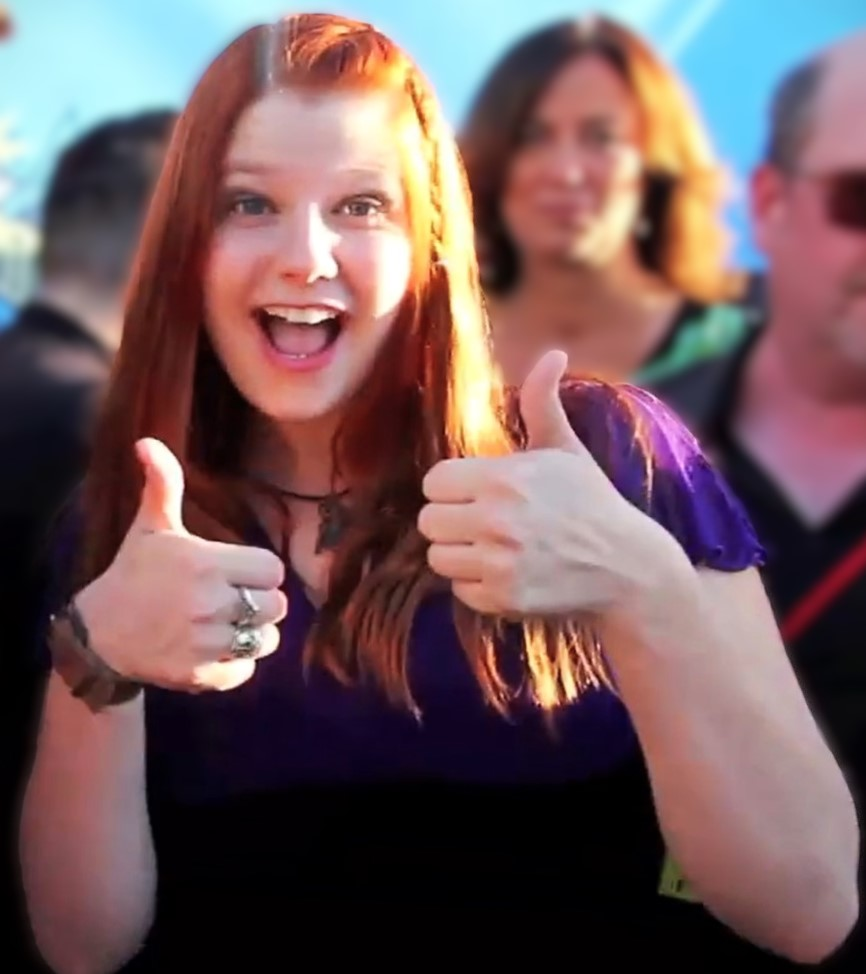
- Gordon in 2014
- Born: March 27, 1986 (age 40); Lafayette, Louisiana, U.S.
- Occupations: Actress; singer
- Years active: 2007–present
- Known for: Star Trek: Prodigy, Library Bards
- Website: librarybards.com

Bonnie Gordon (born March 27, 1986) is an American actress, nerd/parody musician, and professional TTRPG player based in Los Angeles, California. As an actress, she is the voice of the Ship's Computer on the Paramount+ animated series Star Trek: Prodigy, and has also done voice work for Cartoon Network's Mighty Magiswords as well as various anime and video games. She is half of the comedy music duo Library Bards, and has appeared on the reality game shows The Quest and Celebrity Name Game.

== Background and early years ==
Gordon is the granddaughter of U.S. Army Corporal Walter Scott "Smokey" Gordon Jr. of Easy Company, 2nd Battalion, 506th Parachute Infantry Regiment, 101st Airborne during World War II. Her grandfather was portrayed in the HBO miniseries Band of Brothers by actor Ben Caplan.

Gordon attended Northwestern State University in Natchitoches, but shortly after Hurricane Katrina, she relocated to Orlando, Florida to work at Disney World, before joining a Romani equestrian show caravan and touring Renaissance festivals in the upper Midwest as their barker.

== Career ==
=== Acting ===
Early in her career, Gordon was in the cast of the Orlando and later the Las Vegas production of Tony n' Tina's Wedding, and was also a cast member of Star Trek: The Experience in Las Vegas. She was also a regular on Geek and Sundry's Star Trek series, Shield of Tomorrow in 2018, as Lt. Lark Sage. She later portrayed the chief medical officer of the USS Ross, Doctor M'Qrell, on the Star Trek Actual Play series Clear Skies with the Streampunks.

In June 2022, Gordon performed as Lavender Terra in the world stage premiere of Teaching A Robot To Love at the Hollywood Fringe Festival.

=== Gaming ===
Gordon is an avid gamer and professional TTRPG player who has played in campaigns on multiple Twitch channels. In 2014, Gordon participated in the ABC television reality series The Quest, as "Paladin Bonnie." Although a fan favorite, she was "banished" in episode 8th, placing 5th among the competitors.

=== Music ===
After her stint on The Quest, Gordon formed the nerd parody band Library Bards in 2014 with friend and fellow reality TV star Xander Jeanneret. Their first song, "Gandalf" (a parody of Taylor Swift's "Shake it Off") was created in collaboration with the fan site theonering.net, and debuted before the final installment of the Hobbit films. The song debuted as #1 in the comedy genre in Los Angeles on the music website ReverbNation, #2 nationally, and #3 globally in December 2014. The Library Bards continued to hold a top spot in the Comedy genre in Los Angeles, and have been featured on CBS' Celebrity Name Game, SyFy's Geeks Who Drink and on the legendary Dr. Demento Show.

Gordon also performed the English version of the ending theme for the video game, Fire Emblem Echoes: Shadows of Valentia.

On March 25, 2023, Bonnie released her first "nerdy jazz" solo album, "Con Artist".

=== Voice acting ===
As a voice actress, Gordon's roles include Rainbow Mika in the video game Street Fighter V, Silque in Fire Emblem Echoes: Shadows of Valentia, Shikou Soujin from the English dub of the anime series Ikki Tousen: Xtreme Xecutor, Bounce Man from Mega Man 11; Eva from Code Vein, and Yū Abiko (Biko) in Muhyo & Roji's Bureau of Supernatural Investigation, among others. She also voiced multiple characters on Cartoon Network’s Mighty Magiswords.

Gordon voices the Ship's Computer on the Paramount+ and Nickelodeon series Star Trek: Prodigy. She was hired for the role after doing scratch vocals for the characters of Gwyn and Janeway. The series was renewed for a second season in November 2021.

=== Other activities ===
Gordon often performs at Hollywood's Magic Castle, where she has been a performing member for thirteen years.

== Personal life ==
Gordon identifies as graysexual and pansexual.
