= Westercon =

- Status: Active
- Genre: Science fiction
- Country: United States
- Inaugurated: 1948
- Website: http://westercon.org/

Westercon (occasionally WesterCon; long version West Coast Science Fantasy Conference) is a regional science fiction and fantasy convention founded in September 1948 by Walter J. Daugherty of the Los Angeles Science Fantasy Society. The original full name was West Coast Scienti-Fantasy Conference.

== Organization ==
The location of Westercon each year is determined by a bid and voting process by the convention's members. Sites are selected two years in advance. Acceptable locations are cities on the continent of North America, west of the 104th meridian west, or in the state of Hawaii. (Sites in Australia would be eligible as well if either Australia or the United States were to annex the other, as a consequence of a whimsical provision added to the convention's bylaws in 1998 at the suggestion of Down Under Fan Fund delegate Terry Frost. Although this provision may have little practical effect, an attempt to repeal it at the 2003 Westercon Business Meeting failed.)

Guests of Honor are traditionally chosen to showcase professionals who reside in the Westercon region. Given that there are hundreds of potential honorees, it is preferred that guests are chosen that have not been guests of honor at a previous Westercon.

Westercon is traditionally four days long, and is traditionally held on a weekend adjacent to or including the American Independence Day holiday.

The name "Westercon" is a service mark of the Los Angeles Science Fantasy Society, and LASFS retains certain responsibilities regarding Westercon site selection and provisions in case of the failure of a Westercon committee. In practice, Westercon is left to organize itself, with each year's committee acting independently and in its own name, with the general organization (primarily rules for site selection and self-governance) managed through the convention's Bylaws and a Business Meeting (open to all members) held at each Westercon.

== Traditions ==
Through the years several events and activities are traditionally held at Westercon. These events are common to most science fiction and fantasy conventions. Westercon is traditionally four days long; however, due to it traditionally being held near the American Independence Day holiday, the actual days of the week on which it is held vary from year to year, and this can affect the precise timing of events.

Westercon traditionally includes those functions that other general science fiction and fantasy conventions have, including programming on a variety of subjects related to science fiction, fantasy, and fandom. Westercon also includes an art show and a dealers room.

The First Night Icebreaker or "Meet the Guests" event is held on the first evening of programming to allow an informal setting for members to meet the professional attendees of the convention. Mike Glyer introduced the ice cream social as a convention icebreaker in 1978 — borrowing it from Loscon — but it has not been a part of every convention.

A costume contest called a Masquerade is typically held on the second night sometimes of the convention (or sometimes on Saturday night, regardless of when the convention started).

A Regency dance has been a staple for many years, with a rock and roll dance being held as well at least one night of the convention.

Because Westercon members vote on where the Westercon two years hence will be held, site selection voting is generally open on the first and second days of the convention, with the results announced on the third day.

A Business Meeting at which all members of Westercon may propose, debate, and vote upon changes to the convention's bylaws is usually on the second day of the convention, and, if necessary, also on the third day to deal with issues not resolved at the first meeting.

In the evenings, groups host parties for various reasons. Some are promoting other conventions or bids for future Westercons or Worldcons. Others are publicizing groups or clubs and many are just for fun.

== Legacy ==
A group of attendees who ran a portable bookstore at the convention went on to found The Other Change of Hobbit in Berkeley, California, in 1977.

== Recent and upcoming conventions ==
- Westercon 56: "Westercon 56" - SeaTac, Washington, July 3–6, 2003
- Westercon 60: "Gnomeward Bound" - San Mateo, California, June 30-July 3, 2007
- Westercon 61: "A Gathering of Fen in the Desert" - Las Vegas, Nevada, July 3–6, 2008
- Westercon 62: "FiestaCon" - Tempe, Arizona, July 2–5, 2009
- Westercon 63: "Confirmation" - Pasadena, CA, July 1–4, 2010
- Westercon 64: "Westercon 64" - San Jose, CA, July 1–4, 2011
- Westercon 65: "ConClusion" - Seattle, WA, July 5–8, 2012
- Westercon 66: "Westercon 66" - Sacramento, CA, July 4–7, 2013
- Westercon 67: "Trailblazers to the Future" - Salt Lake City, UT - July 3–6, 2014
- Westercon 68: "Westercon 68" - San Diego, CA - July 2–5, 2015
- Westercon 69: "Westercon 69" - Portland, OR - July 1–4, 2016
- Westercon 70: "ConAlope" - Tempe, AZ - July 1–4, 2017
- Westercon 72: "Spikecon" - Layton, UT - July 4-7, 2019 (also the 2019 North American Science Fiction Convention)
- Westercon 73: Seattle, WA Canceled. Originally planned for July 1-4, 2020, was postponed to 2021, disbanded April 2021
- Westercon 74: "Westercon 74" - Tonopah, NV July 1-4, 2022 (postponed from 2021)
- Westercon 75: Anaheim, CA, scheduled for June 30 – July 3, 2023 Canceled and combined with Loscon 49, November 24–26, 2023, Los Angeles, CA
- Westercon 76: Salt Lake City, UT - July 4–7, 2024
- Westercon 77: Santa Clara, CA, in combination with BayCon - July 4–7, 2025
- Westercon 78: Santa Clara, CA, in combination with BayCon - July 3–6, 2026
