= 29th World Science Fiction Convention =

29th Worldcon (1971)

Coordinates: 42.346626°N 71.083815°W

Noreascon I, the 29th World Science Fiction Convention
- Genre: Science fiction
- Dates: 2–6 September 1971
- Venue: Sheraton-Boston Hotel
- Location: Boston, Massachusetts
- Country: United States
- Attendance: ~1,600
- Filing status: non-profit

The 29th World Science Fiction Convention (Worldcon), also known as Noreascon I, was held on 2–6 September 1971 at the Sheraton-Boston Hotel in Boston, Massachusetts, United States.

The chairman was Tony Lewis.

== Participants ==
Attendance was approximately 1,600.

=== Guests of honor ===
- Clifford D. Simak (pro)
- Harry Warner, Jr. (fan)
- Robert Silverberg (toastmaster)

== Awards ==
The World Science Fiction Society administers and presents the Hugo Awards, the oldest and most noteworthy award for science fiction. Selection of the recipients is by vote of the Worldcon members. Categories include novels and short fiction, artwork, dramatic presentations, and various professional and fandom activities.

Other awards may be presented at Worldcon at the discretion of the individual convention committee. This has often included the national SF awards of the host country, such as the Japanese Seiun Awards as part of Nippon 2007, and the Prix Aurora Awards as part of Anticipation in 2009. The Astounding Award for Best New Writer and the Sidewise Award, though not sponsored by the Worldcon, are usually presented, as well as the Chesley Awards, the Prometheus Award, and others. In 2021, the Nommo Awards began presenting at Worldcon.

=== 1971 Hugo Awards ===
- Best Novel: Ringworld by Larry Niven
- Best Novella: "Ill Met in Lankhmar" by Fritz Leiber
- Best Short Story: "Slow Sculpture" by Theodore Sturgeon
- Best Professional Magazine: Fantasy & Science Fiction
- Best Professional Artist: Leo Dillon and Diane Dillon
- Best Fanzine: Locus, edited by Charles N. Brown and Dena Brown
- Best Fan Writer: Richard E. Geis
- Best Fan Artist: Alicia Austin

== Notes ==
The convention is mentioned in the preface to The Ringworld Engineers for the MIT students who pointed out that the Ringworld would be unstable.

== See also ==
- Hugo Award
- Science fiction
- Speculative fiction
- World Science Fiction Society
- Worldcon

Preceded by 28th World Science Fiction Convention; Heicon '70 in Heidelberg, Germany (1970)	List of Worldcons; 29th World Science Fiction Convention; Noreascon I in Boston, Massachusetts, United States (1971)	Succeeded by 30th World Science Fiction Convention; L.A.con I in Los Angeles, California, United States (1972)
