= SMOFcon =

Annual convention for convention organizers

- Status: Active
- Genre: Science fiction
- Location: varies
- Inaugurated: 1984
- Website: ldtm57.pairserver.com/smofcon/

SMOFcon is an annual convention that focuses on the organisation of science fiction conventions. The first SMOFcon took place in 1984, and most have taken place in the United States.

SMOFcon typically attracts 100–150 attendees, and usually occurs in the first weekend of December, though other dates have been known. The content includes formal and informal sessions covering insights from events held in the previous year, information about the latest trends from the community and external experts, reviews of previous events and feedback to bidders for upcoming events, with a focus on learnings that can be widely shared.

A significant number of SMOFcon attendees are also Worldcon organisers and the programme usually includes sessions about the most recent Worldcon and on bids for future Worldcons.

The name of the convention is derived from the word SMOF (also spelled smof), which is an acronym which stands for "Secret Master(s) Of Fandom" and is a term used within the science fiction fan community. Its coining is generally attributed to science fiction author Jack L. Chalker.

== List of SMOFcons ==
Name	Year	Dates	City	Country	Web	Site/Facility	Chair/Sponsoring Org	Size
0th	1973/74		New York	United States		Sheraton	Stew Brownstein	
1st	1984	Oct 12–14	Washington, D.C.	United States			Ben Yalow, Joe Siclari, Theresa Renner	
2nd	1985	Nov	Oakland, CA	United States		CANCELLED	Tom Whitmore, Debbie Notkin + 3 others	
3rd	1986	Dec 5–7	Lowell, MA	United States		Lowell Hilton	Mark Olson (MCFI)	137
4th	1987	Nov 20–22	Columbus, OH	United States		Quality Inn Columbus Airport	Bob Hillis	
5th	1988	Dec 9–11	Phoenix, AZ	United States		Hyatt Regency Phoenix	Bruce Farr (CASFS)	102
6th	1989	Dec 8–10	Toronto, ON	Canada		Holiday Inn Airport	Lloyd & Yvonne Penney	
7th	1990	Dec 7–9	Ft. Lauderdale, FL	United States		Airport Hilton	Joe Siclari (SFSFS)	
8th	1991	Dec 6–8	Portland, OR	United States		Shilo Inn Airport	John Lorentz (OSFCI)	128
9th	1992	Dec 11–13	New Orleans, LA	United States		Doubletree Hotel	Peggy Rae Pavlat	95
10th	1993	Apr 23–25	Jersey	Channel Islands		Hotel de France	Tim Illingworth	
11th	1993	Dec 3–5	Lexington, KY	United States		Griffin Gate Marriott Resort	Scott & Jane Dennis	110
12th	1994	Dec 2–4	Burbank, CA	United States		Burbank Hilton	Chocolate Moose; Vice Chairs: Bruce Pelz & Ben Yalow (SCIFI)	175
13th	1995	Dec 1–3	Austin, TX	United States		Austin Red Lion	Fred Duarte Jr. (FACT)	121
14th	1996	Dec 6–8	Seattle, WA	United States		Seattle Hilton	Richard Wright (NCL)	
15th	1997	Dec 5–7	Boston, MA	United States		Doubletree Suites Hotel	Sharon Sbarsky (MCFI)	153
16th	1998	Dec 4–6	Colorado Springs, CO	United States		Radisson Inn	Kent Bloom (FFF)	86
17th	1999	Dec 10–11	New Orleans, LA	United States		New Orleans DoubleTree Hotel	Michael Siladi (SFSFC)	
18th	2000	Dec 1–3	Cocoa Beach, FL	United States		Holiday Inn Cocoa Beach	Joe Siclari (SFSFS)	
19th	2001	Dec 7–9	York	UK		Monkbar Hotel	KIM Campbell	
20th	2002	Dec 6–8	San Diego, CA	United States		Hacienda Hotel	Scott & Jane Dennis	125
21st	2003	Dec 5–7	Rosemont, IL	United States		Embassy Suites O'Hare	Erik V. Olson (Midfan)	123
22nd	2004	Dec 3–5	Washington, DC	United States		Wyndham Washington, DC	Peggy Rae Sapienza (WSFA)	123
23rd	2005	Dec 2–4	Portland, OR	United States		Red Lion Convention Center Hotel	David Schaber (OSFCI)	155
24th	2006	Dec 1–3	Kansas City, MO	United States		Hotel Phillips	Margene Bahm (MASFFC)	
25th	2007	Dec 7–9	Boston, MA	United States		Hilton Boston Logan Airport	Geri Sullivan (MCFI)	214
26th	2008	Dec 4–7	Columbus, OH	United States		Drury Inn & Suites	Kim Williams	130
27th	2009	Dec 4–6	Austin, TX	United States		Hilton Garden Inn Austin Downtown	Karen Meschke (ALAMO)	156
28th	2010	Dec 3–5	San Jose, CA	United States		Larkspur Sainte Claire	Glenn Glazer (SFSFC)	157
29th	2011	Dec 2–4	Amsterdam	Netherlands		Park Plaza Victoria Amsterdam	Vincent Docherty	130
30th	2012	Nov 30 – Dec 2	Philadelphia	United States		Hyatt Regency Penn's Landing	Joni Brill Dashoff & Laurie Mann	196
31st	2013	Dec 6–8	Toronto, Ontario	Canada		Fairmont Royal York Hotel	Diane Lacey (CanSmof)	
32nd	2014	Dec 5–7	Manhattan Beach, CA	United States		Manhattan Beach Marriott	Bobbi Armbruster & Kim Marks Brown (SCIFI)	212
33rd	2015	Dec 4–6	Fort Worth, TX	United States		Sheraton Fort Worth Hotel and Spa	Tim Miller (Dallas Future Society)	
34th	2016	Dec 2–4	Rosemont, IL	United States		Crowne Plaza	Helen Montgomery	167
35th	2017	Dec 1–3	Boston, MA	United States		Back Bay Hilton	Laurie Mann	219
36th	2018	Nov 30 – Dec 2	Santa Rosa, CA	United States		Flamingo Conference Resort and Spa	Bruce Farr	~165
37th	2019	Dec 6–8	Albuquerque, NM	United States		Hyatt Regency Albuquerque	Ron Oakes	
SMOFcon 37&1/4	2020	Dec 5	Virtual				SMOFcon 38 & 39 Committees	
SMOFcon Europe / 39	2021	Dec 3–5	Lisbon	Portugal		VIP Executive Art's Hotel	James Bacon & Vincent Docherty	55/144
SMOFcon 38	2022	Dec 2–4	Montreal	Canada		Le Centre Sheraton Montreal Hotel	Jannie Shea	
SMOFcon 40	2023	Dec 1–3	Providence, RI	United States		Providence Marriott Downtown	Lisa Hertel (MCFI)	
SMOFcon 41	2024	Dec 6–8	Seattle, WA	United States		DoubleTree by Hilton Seattle Airport	Marah Searle-Kovacevic	
SMOFcon 42	2025	Dec 5–7	Stockholm	Sweden		Dieselverkstaden	Carolina Gómez Lagerlöf	~130
SMOFcon 43	2026	Dec 4-6	Lisbon	Portugal		VIP Executive Art's Hotel	Esther MacCallum-Stewart & Vincent Docherty	
