= Locus (magazine) =

Science fiction and fantasy publishing trade magazine

- Editor: Liza Groen Trombi
- Frequency: Monthly
- Founded: 1968; 58 years ago
- Country: United States
- Based in: Oakland, California
- Language: English
- Website: locusmag.com
- ISSN: 0047-4959

Locus: The Magazine of The Science Fiction & Fantasy Field, founded in 1968, is an American magazine published monthly in Oakland, California. It is the news organ and trade journal for the English-language science fiction and fantasy fields. It also publishes comprehensive listings of all new books published in the genres (excluding self-published). The magazine also presents the annual Locus Awards. Locus Online was launched in April 1997, as a semi-autonomous web version of Locus Magazine.

== History ==
Charles N. Brown, Ed Meskys, and Dave Vanderwerf founded Locus in 1968 as a news fanzine to promote the (ultimately successful) bid to host the 1971 World Science Fiction Convention in Boston, Massachusetts. Originally intended to run only until the site-selection vote was taken at St. Louiscon, the 1969 Worldcon in St. Louis, Missouri, Brown decided to continue publishing Locus as a mimeographed general science fiction and fantasy newszine. Locus succeeded the monthly newszine Science Fiction Times (formerly Fantasy Times, founded in 1941), when SFT ceased publication in 1970. Brown directed Locus as publisher and editor-in-chief for more than 40 years, from 1968 until his death at age 72 in July 2009.

Locus continued subsequent operations, with then executive editor Liza Groen Trombi succeeding Brown as editor-in-chief in 2009. The magazine is now owned by the Locus Science Fiction Foundation, a 501(c)(3) tax-exempt, nonprofit corporation.

Locus publishes:

- News about the science fiction, fantasy, and horror publishing field—stories about publishers, awards, and conferences—including "The Data File", "People & Publishing" (rights sold, books sold, books resold, books delivered, publishing news, promotions; people news and photos about vacations, weddings, and births), and obituaries
- Interviews with well-known and up-and-coming writers (and sometimes editors and artists), usually two per issue
- Reviews of new and forthcoming books, usually 20–25 per issue, by notable SF critics including Gary K. Wolfe, Faren Miller, Nick Gevers, Jonathan Strahan, Adrienne Martini, Russell Letson, Gwenda Bond, Stefan Dziemanowicz, Carolyn Cushman, Karen Burnham, and Richard A. Lupoff plus short fiction reviews by Gardner Dozois and Rich Horton
- A bimonthly commentary column by Cory Doctorow
- Reports from around the world about the SF scenes in various countries
- Listings of US and UK books and magazines published (monthly), bestsellers (monthly), and forthcoming books (every three months)
- Convention reports, with many photos
- Annual year-in-review coverage, with extensive recommended reading lists and the annual Locus Poll and Survey
- Letters and classified ads
- The Locus Index to Science Fiction, compiled from the magazine's "books received" column.

== Locus Online ==
Locus Online (founded in 1997) is the online component of Locus Magazine. It publishes news briefs related to the science fiction, fantasy and horror publishing world, along with original reviews and feature articles, and excerpts of articles that appeared in the print edition. Information for Locus Online is compiled and edited by Mark R. Kelly. In 2002, Locus Online won the first Hugo Award for Best Web Site. It was nominated again in 2005. Longtime short-fiction reviewer Lois Tilton quit Locus in January 2016. She stated that editors had deleted material from her reviews that they deemed inappropriate. Locus later clarified that the edits were not intended to be made to work already published, but rather going forward, to future reviews. None of her past columns were changed, she was paid for the unpublished work, and the relationship ended amicably.

== Locus Awards ==
Awarded annually since 1971, the Locus Awards are voted on by the readership of Locus magazine. Developed initially as a reading list for the Hugo Awards, they have since come to be considered a prestigious prize in science fiction, fantasy and horror literature.

== Science Fiction Awards Database ==
Known previously as the Locus Index to SF Awards, the Science Fiction Awards Database (SFADB) is an index of science fiction, fantasy and horror awards compiled by Mark R. Kelly. It is often more up-to-date than the awards' own websites (according to The Encyclopedia of Science Fiction), and has received praise from editors and authors of SF.

== Recognition ==
Locus has won many Hugo Awards, first the Hugo Award for Best Fanzine, and then in 1984 when the new category "Best Semiprozine" was established. As of 2012, Locus won the award for "Best Fanzine" eight times and for "Best Semiprozine" 22 times during the category's first 29 years. In 2012 "Best Semiprozine" was redefined to exclude all small, independent genre magazines as "professional publications" if they had either "(1) provided at least a quarter the income of any one person or, (2) was owned or published by any entity which provided at least a quarter the income of any of its staff and/or owner" and this included Locus. There is no longer a "Professional Magazine" Hugo Award and was replaced in 1973 by the current "Best Editor".

== See also ==
- List of literary magazines
