= Weddings in ancient Rome =

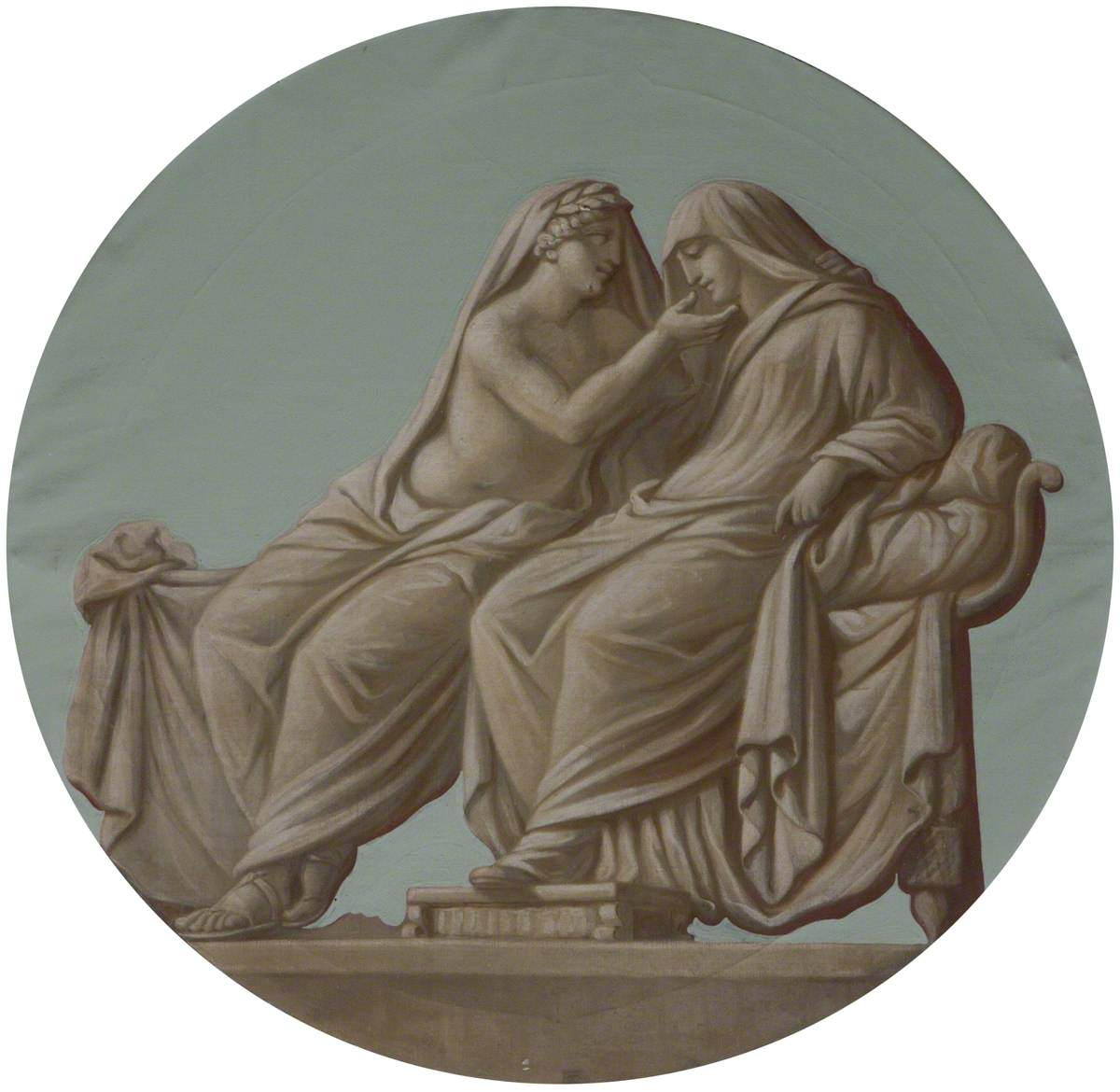
A depiction of two lovers at a wedding. From the Aldobrandini Wedding fresco

The precise customs and traditions of weddings in ancient Rome likely varied heavily across geography, social strata, and time period; Christian authors writing in late antiquity report different customs from earlier authors writing during the Classical period, with some authors condemning practices described by earlier writers. Furthermore, sources may be heavily biased towards depicting weddings of wealthier Roman or portraying a highly idealized image of the Roman wedding, one that may not accurately reflect how the ritual was performed in ordinary life by the majority of Romans. In some circumstances, Roman literary depictions of weddings appear to select the practices included within their portrayal based upon artistic conceit rather than the veracity of those accounts; writers may have intentionally imitated the works of earlier, more famous authors such as Statius or Catullus. For instance, the writer 4th-century poet Claudian frequently notes the presence of pagan deities at the wedding of Emperor Honorius (r. 393–423) and Maria, despite the fact that Rome had already been Christianized by his lifetime and thus most Romans likely had little concern for paganism.

Roman weddings were likely highly religious affairs: the date of the wedding itself was potentially influenced by religious superstition regarding auspicious and inauspicious dates. Prior to the wedding, the auspices may have been consulted to ensure the presence of propitious omens; Roman authors often note the presence of inauspicious signs at doomed or otherwise misfortunate weddings. Sacrifices may also have been performed at Roman weddings, with authors such as Varro noting the presence of pig sacrifices at weddings, although this practice may have been antiquated by the Empire as it is unsupported by artistic evidence. Other forms of sacrifice, such the sacrifice of bulls or sheep, are more commonly showcased in artistic portrayals of Roman weddings scenes.

The Roman wedding was centered around a ritual referred to as the domum deductio, a ritualistic kidnapping in which the bride was led from the home of her original family to abode of the groom. This ritual was often described with violent language, with Roman authors emphasizing the fear, suffering, and reluctance of the bride throughout the entire ceremony; they typically mention the bride's tears and blushing, associating her with a sense of shame and modesty referred to in the Latin language as pudor. This was done to convince the household guardians, or lares, that the bride did not go willingly. Afterwards, the bride and the groom had their first sexual experiences on a couch called a lectus. In a Roman wedding both sexes had to wear specific clothing. Boys had to wear the toga virilis while the bride to wear a wreath, a veil, a yellow hairnet, sex crines, and the hasta caelibaris.

== Clothing ==
=== Bridal clothing ===
==== Tunics and belts ====
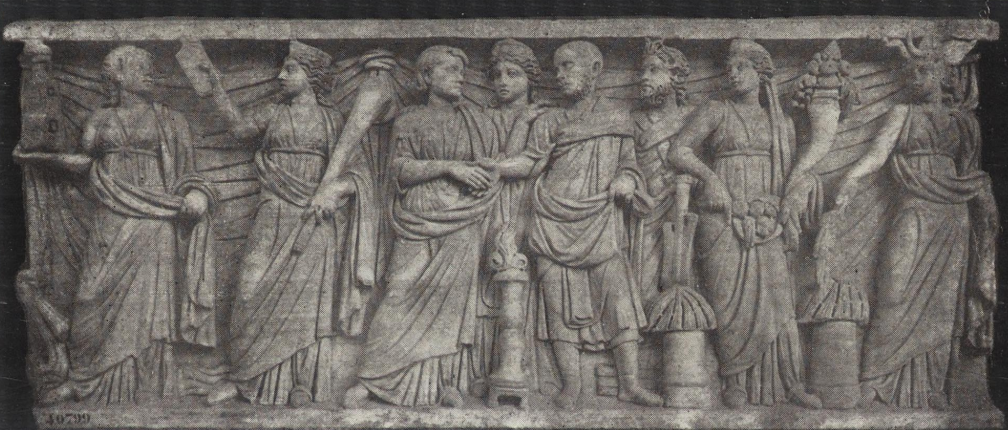
3rd-century Roman sarcophagus depicting an unusual wedding scene; the bride is not veiled, she lacks the fillet, she wears no jewelry, her hair is not arranged conventionally, and the bride is adorned with the standard dress of a Roman matron, not the tunica recta. Furthermore, the wedding lacks a torcher-bearer or any torch at all.

The 1st-century CE writer Pliny the Elder claims that both brides and tirones, new recruits into the Roman army, wore a piece of clothing called the tunica recta. Pliny states that Tanaquil, the wife of the 5th King of Rome Tarquinius Priscus, weaved the first of such tunics. Festus, a 2nd-century grammarian, also mentions that brides and tirones wore a type of tunic, although he refers to the garment as "regillae tunicae" ("royal tunics") and claims that brides wore it alongside yellow hairnets called "reticula lutea." According to Festus, the tunicae were woven by "those standing," possibly referring to the bride herself. The 3rd-century CE Christian apologist Arnobius references a practice in which brides have their togae offered, possibly by themselves or others, to the deity Fortuna Virginalis prior to the wedding; he is the only Roman author to describe the goddess in the context of the wedding. The classicist Karen Hersch suggests that the account of Arnobius may be inaccurate, as his assertions remain entirely unsupported by other pieces of Roman literature; other Roman authors fail to mention such a tradition even when describing the bridal attire. Although Hersch concedes that the remainder of the account of Arnobius is supported by other Roman authors, such as his reference to the bridal lectus ("couch, bed") and the hasta ("spear").

The tunic of the bride may have been tied together using a type of belt called the cingulum or the zona, which possibly functioned as some signifier of chastity. In Roman poetry, a belt is sometimes used as shorthand for the either the wedding or the virginity of the bride: Catullus describes a father dishonoring his son's bride by untying her belt and mentions the "zonula_{,}" a "little girdle" untied by the brides for the god Hymen. Marcus Terentius Varro, a 1st-century BCE Roman polymath, claims that the groom would untie the belt and remain silent for the duration of the task. Festus also describes the presence of a belt in the Roman wedding, claiming that the goddess Juno Cinxia was "sacred" to weddings since the ceremony began with the "unloosing of the belt." The 4th-century BCE Christian theologian Augustine of Hippo also references a wedding belt when he satirically implores the remaining Roman polytheists to replace their many gods with one version of Jupiter worshipped under many epithets, advising the Romans "As the god Iugatinus let him [Jupiter] unite married couples, and when the bride's girdle is loosed let him be invoked as Virginensis."

Festus mentions another garment called the nodus Herculaneus ("knot of Hercules"), which Festus claims is untied by the husband whilst the couple is lying in bed. According to Festus, the knot represented the bond between the bride and the groom, claiming that the husband shall be bound to the wife as the tufts of wool are bound together to create the knot. It thus may have served as some variety of love charm for the bride, although was also said—by Festus—to ensure the groom could be as fruitful as Hercules, who had 70 children. Pliny mentions that the knot in a medical context, declaring that binding wounds with the knot "makes the healing wonderfully more rapid" and mentioning an unspecified "certain usefulness" that "is said" to derive from tying a girdle with the knot daily.

==== Sex crines ====
Festus claims that Roman brides wore a hairstyle referred to within the text as senibus crinibus, an inflected form of either sex crines or seni crines. It is possible that "sēnī" is an adjective deriving from the numeral "sex," meaning six. According to this view, the "sēnī crīnēs" likely would have comprised six locks of hair. The 1st-century Roman poet Martial mentions a wife adorned with a septem crinibus. This unusual bridal hairstyle, likely containing 7 locks instead of 6, has been argued—by the classicist Laetitia La Follette—to be an intentional discrepancy used to portray the bride as aberrant and unfaithful. Another possibility is that the word, at least in this context, derives from proposed reconstructions of the Proto-Indo-European verbs "*seh₁-," meaning "to bind," or "*sek-," meaning "cut." If these theories are correct, then it could indicate that the hairstyle involved bounded or cut hair respectively. However, evidence from comparative linguistics strongly suggests that the first reconstruction is inaccurate. The second reconstruction, suggesting that the bride's hair was cut, is incongruent with Roman standards of beauty: long hair was considered to be a component of the ideal feminine physique, indicating that—if the practice of cutting the bride's hair did occur—this ritual would have been shameful for the bride.

Other components of the bridal attire functioned to honor the bride in some manner: the tunica recta was woven by the bride herself, showcasing her skill at weaving, and the yellow-red wedding veil—known as the flammeum—symbolized faithfulness and fertility. According to Festus, brides favored the style due to its age; he also stated that it was used by the Vestal Virgins, lending some credence to the theory that the bridal hairstyle was cut as vestal virgins certainly wore short hair. However, the vestal virgins may have worn a fillet to compensate for their shortened hair, allowing the analogy between the bridal and vestal hair to remain compatible with long bridal hair and short vestal hair. In Miles Gloriosus, a play by the Roman 3rd-century BCE comic playwright Plautus, the author portrays a woman dressed like a standard married Roman woman: her hairstyle is described as having "locks with her hair arranged, and fillets after the fashion of matrons" as part of an effort to disguise the woman as another character's wife. This seemingly contradicts the idea of short bridal hair, as Plautus explicitly describes the woman as wearing long hair.

In his description, Festus leaves the proper origins of the sex crines ambiguous: he does not clearly indicate whether the vestal virgins coopted the style from brides or vice versa. Another passage from Festus appears to support the idea that the brides copied the style from vestals: Festus mentions that brides adopted a veil called the flammeum due to its usage by the Flaminica Dialis, the high-priestess of Jupiter and the wife of the Flamen Dialis. The similar nature of both these scenarios indicates that, just as bride's may have coopted the flammeum from a religious order, they may have coopted the sex crines. Mary Beard, an English classicist, argued that both vestal virgins and brides embodied a liminal state between youthful virginity and adulthood as a Roman matron; Beard proposed that vestal virgins copied bridal attire due to these shared connotations. American classicist Edward Ross expresses that the sex crines may have merely showed that the bride possessed the ideal state of virginity and purity also demanded of Vestal Virgins. Ross cites a passage from Festus which proclaims that other women, along with brides, adopted the sex crines from the Vestal Virgins. The reason given was that the chastity of the Vestals "was promised to their men... [sic] by others." To reinforce the connection between the bridal hairstyle and the vestal virgins, the number of locks likely present in the hair exactly corresponds to the number of vestal virgins during reliably recorded parts of Roman history: 6. Although, the 1st CE historian Plutarch records that the number of vestal virgins changed from 2 to 4 to 6 during the regnal period.

The German classical philologist August Rossbach argued that the sex crines were a typical component of the attire of a Roman matron, and that brides wore the headgear merely because it marked their transition into marriage and matronhood. Rossbach cited the section of Miles Gloriosus by Plautus, in which the author describes a woman dressed to look like a married woman wearing a hairstyle with fillets modeled after those worn by matrons. The fillets mentioned by Plautus, called "vittae," are not definitively supported by any other evidence to be a component of the bridal hairstyle in ancient Rome. Furthermore, it is unlikely that the crines mentioned by Plautus are the same cosmetic as the sex crines described by Festus. The 1st-century BCE Roman poet Horace uses the same word, "crinis," completely unrelated to Roman brides when he describes the hairstyle of the mythical figure of the Trojan War, Paris.

==== Hasta caelibaris ====
Festus mentions a spear called the hasta caelibaris ("celibate spear") that was supposedly used in wedding rituals to separate locks of hair. The 1st-century BCE Roman poet Ovid possibly references this spear in his writings when he instructs his female audience to, during the wedding ceremony, let a "hasta recurva" ("bent-back spear") arrange their "virgin locks." Since the ultimate source for Festus' account is the earlier 1st-century BCE author Verrius Flaccus, it is possible unclear exactly how accurately his account reflects Roman practices during both his lifetimes and that of Ovid. If the spear had become an outdated ritual, Ovid may have been intentionally invoking an archaic practice or using a phrase that had become shorthand for the wedding ceremony. Plutarch, a 1st-century Greek philosopher, implies that spears remained involved in Roman weddings during his lifetime: In his Questiones Romanae, Plutarch inquires, "Why do they part the hair of brides with the point of a spear?" Tertullian, a 2nd-century Christian theologian, describes a type of pin called the "acus lascivior" ("lascivious needle") being used to fashion women's hair. Although, it is still not explicitly stated to be a hasta caelibaris used for wedding ceremonies, merely a hairpin used by Roman women. Arnobius mentions the hasta caelibaris by name as an antiquated custom. He attempts to defend the abandonment of pagan traditions and shift towards Christian religion by citing many older, forgotten customs, including the usage of a spearpoint in wedding ceremonies, asking the readers if they still "stroke the hair of brides with the hasta caelibaris?" However, the spear possibly appears in the wedding epithalamium of the 4th-century poet Claudian. During his description of the wedding of two royals, Claudian mentions that the goddess Venus uses an acus to split the hair of the bride.

Festus claims that the spear held symbolic value to the Romans, that it displayed the husband's authority over his bride. He connects the spear to Juno Curitis, the goddess of marriage and childbirth whose epithet—Curitis—derives from the possibly Sabine word curis, meaning "spear." Evidence from Plutarch provides further support for this association: Plutarch asks if the spearpoint symbolizes "the marriage of the first Roman wives by violence with attendant war." This quote references the rape of the Sabine women, an event from Roman mythology in which the early Romans, desperately in need of a greater female population to ensure continued population growth, abducted Sabine women to marry them and then reproduce. Plutarch also proposes that the violent, distinctly unfeminine (in Roman society) connotations of a spearpoint may have conveyed that the groom was "brave and warlike." He concludes by suggesting a final possibility: that the spear signified that "with steel alone can their marriage be dissolved." The 1st-century BCE Roman historian Livy claims that the Sabine women embraced their newfound husbands and families, suggesting that the spear may have indicated that the bride would similarly submit to her new husband and family.

Festus states that the spear must be drawn from the corpse of a gladiator, so that the bride and groom will be joined as close as the spear was to the gladiator. This claim is supported in almost no other text, although the 1st-century CE writer Pliny the Elder mentions that spears drawn from human corpses without touching the ground can be thrown over the house to expedite the childbirth process if the pregnant woman is located inside the aforementioned house. Pliny further states that arrows drawn from cadavers, also without touching the ground, can be placed under the bed of an individual to act as a love-charm. He also attributes magical properties to the blood of gladiators, stating that it can be used as a treatment for epilepsy. These accounts from Pliny imply that the hasta caelibaris may had a similar role as a sign of fertility and a love-charm. It is possible that the hasta caelibaris may have been used to split the locks of sex crines, although there is no explicit connection between the spear and the sex crines with the possible exception of the "acus lascivior" mentioned by Tertullian. Tertullian states that this pin was used to separate the "crinibus," or women's hair. If the hasta caelibaris was connected to the sex crines, then it remains unclear exactly why no author mentions the item in connection to the Vestal Virgins, who were also linked to the sex crines.

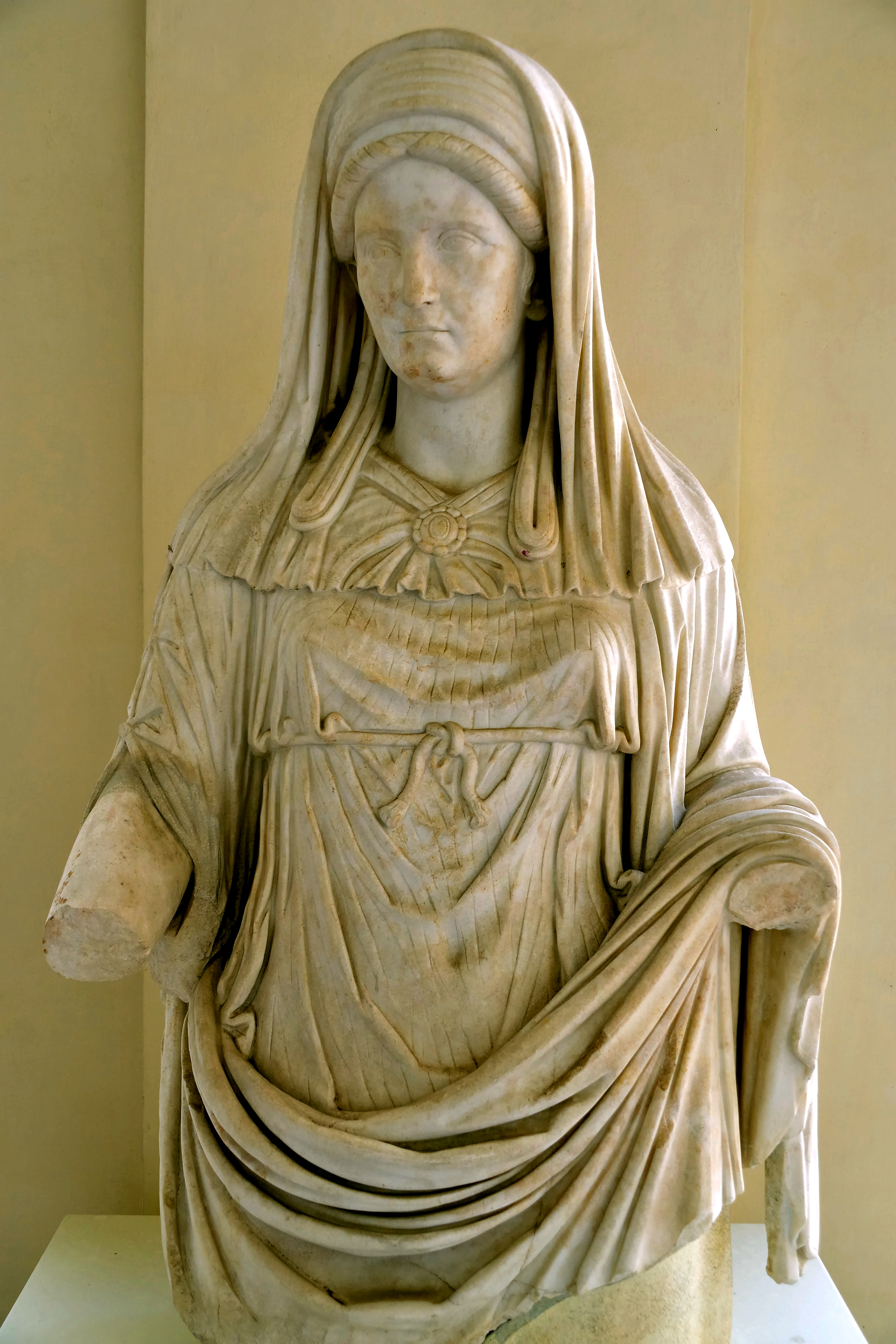
2nd-century CE portrait depicting a Vestal Virgin, the looped strings by her neck may be vittae

==== Vittae and infulae ====
Accounts from Propertius, a 1st-century BCE Roman love elegist, suggest that a type of woolen band or fillet called vittae were parts of the bridal attire. In of his poems, Propertius depicts the perspective of a deceased woman named Cornelia on Paullus, her still living husband, stating "Soon, the bordered (toga) yielded to wedding torches, and another altera vitta captured my bound hair, and I was joined to your bed, Paullus, destined to leave it." This passage may be interpreted as referring to Cornelia abandoning her childhood fillets for bridal fillets, or as Cornelia relinquishing her childhood fillets for matronal fillets. Another passage from Propertius details the misfortunes of Arethusa, who laments that their wedding was tainted as her vitta was not placed upon her head properly. The vittae, alongside the stolae, are used in Roman literature as shorthand for the Roman matron. Tibullus, a 1st-century BCE Roman elegist, implores Delia, his mistress, to behave like a proper Roman woman, saying "Teach her to be chaste, although no vitta binds her hair together." Similarly, Plautus describes an incident in which a slave named Palaestrio advised as old man named Periplectomenus to disguise the prostitute Acroteleutium as his wife, instructing him to adorn her with vittae styled after the "fashion of matrons." It is likely that vittae were considered to be representative of chastity and purity: the 4th-century grammarian Servius states that prostitutes were forbidden from wearing the garment and Ovid commands the "chaste" vittae to stay away from his sexually explicit poems. British-Canadian Classicist Elaine Fantham proposes that the vittae may have offered some variety of "moral protection" comparable to the "bulla," an apotropaic amulet used to protect Roman boys.

According to Servius, vittae hung from the sides of another—potentially bridal—adornment: a red and white band-like crown called the infula. Servius provides additional descriptions of the infula, stating that they were worn like diadems and made from white or scarlet threads. Catullus, in his epithalamium for Peleus and Thetis, mentions an adornment called the filum which may also have appeared at the Roman wedding. Within the poem, the Parcae predict that, following the wedding, the filum will no longer be worn around that bride's neck. It is possible that this metaphorically represented the loss of virginity upon the wedding day, and therefore it may be connected to the vittae due to their shared chastity connotations. Another possibility is that the filum was connected to girlhood in Roman culture, and therefore it was abandoned following the wedding and transition to adulthood. Otherwise, it may have been an entirely meaningless piece of clothing, and the main focus of the passage is actually on the nurse of the bride.

==== Flammeum ====
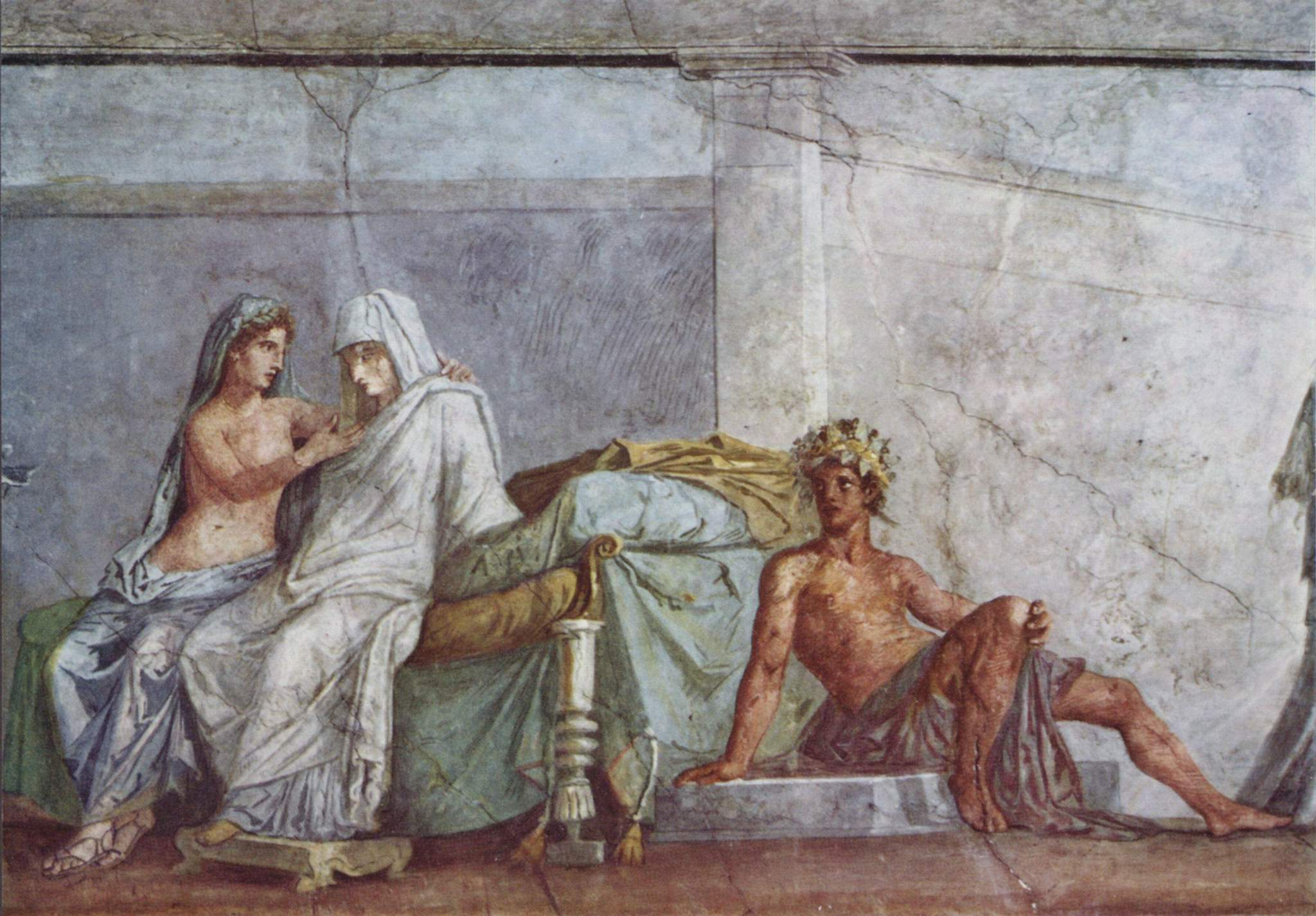
Scene from the Aldobrandini Wedding frescoes that possibly depicts a veiled Roman bride. The scene is not unanimously accepted as a depiction of a wedding, with other proposals including that it depicts the Alcestis myth.

The flammeum, a type of bridal veil, was a staple component of the bridal hairstyle in ancient Rome. During the 1st century, the Roman author Catullus continues to use the term flammeum to refer to both the covering and the bride: in Catullus 61, he instructs children to "Raise high, O boys, the torches: I see the gleaming veil approach." In the Epigrams of Martial, the author utilizes the weaving of the flammeum as shorthand for the entire wedding ceremony, stating "The veils are a-weaving for your fiancée, the girl is already being dressed." In another one of his epigrams, he describes the wedding of two men named Calistratus and Afer, stating that Callistratus weds exactly like the virgin brides of traditional Roman weddings. To further emphasize his point, he mentions that he wears the flammeum, is accompanied by torches, and by the rude songs found in Roman wedding ceremonies.

The covering is mentioned throughout Roman literature, from its mention in the works of the 2nd-century BCE Celtic-Roman poet Caecilius Statius to the time of 4th-century CE during the time of Claudian. Pliny the Elder refers to the veil as "antiquissimus" (meaning "very old"), claiming that the color luteus was held in high regard during these ancient times and was thus reserved for bridal veils. Similarly, Festus cites two ancient authors called Cincius and Aelius, who—according to Festus—claim that the "ancients" (antiqui), call the practice of covering the bride's head with the flammeum "obnubere," or "the veiling." Jan Radicke argues that the flammeum likely remained in use by the lifetime of Catullus as it retained a strong sense of prominence in his poems, although he concludes that by the Augustan era the garment had fallen out of fashion. Literature from the Early Imperial era makes little reference to the garment; for instance, it is absent from Statius' wedding epithalamium for Lucius Arruntius Stella. The 1st-century CE Roman poet Lucan describes the functions of the flammeum, although Radicke interprets this as a historical account of a traditional Roman headdress, not a contemporary account of a piece of clothing that remained in use by the lifetime of Lucan. According to Radicke, later references to the garment are better explained as intentional invocations of an ancient practice designed to portray the individuals involved as staunch traditionalists.

Lucan mentions that the flammeum was used to conceal the blushing of the bride; he claims that during the wedding of a woman named Marcia, who lacked this veil, it was not present to disguise her "timid blushes." Improper, or "worn-out" flammea are usually mentioned in Roman literature alongside immodest, unvirtuous wives. Juvenal mentions that a woman has remarried many times "flies from one home to another, wearing out her bridal veil." The 2nd-century writer Apuleius disparages the wife of a man named Pontianus, saying that she has been deflowered, shameless, and wearing a worn-out veil. Festus mentions that, since the garment was also worn by the Flaminica Dialis (the priestess and wife of Jupiter), it was viewed as an auspicious charm designed to bring good fortune. Since the Flaminica was unable to divorce Jupiter, it is possible that the flammeum was worn by brides as a protective charm against divorce or ill fortune in marriage. Another possibility is that the Flaminica was viewed as a perpetual bride, henceforth she permanently wore the bridal headpiece.

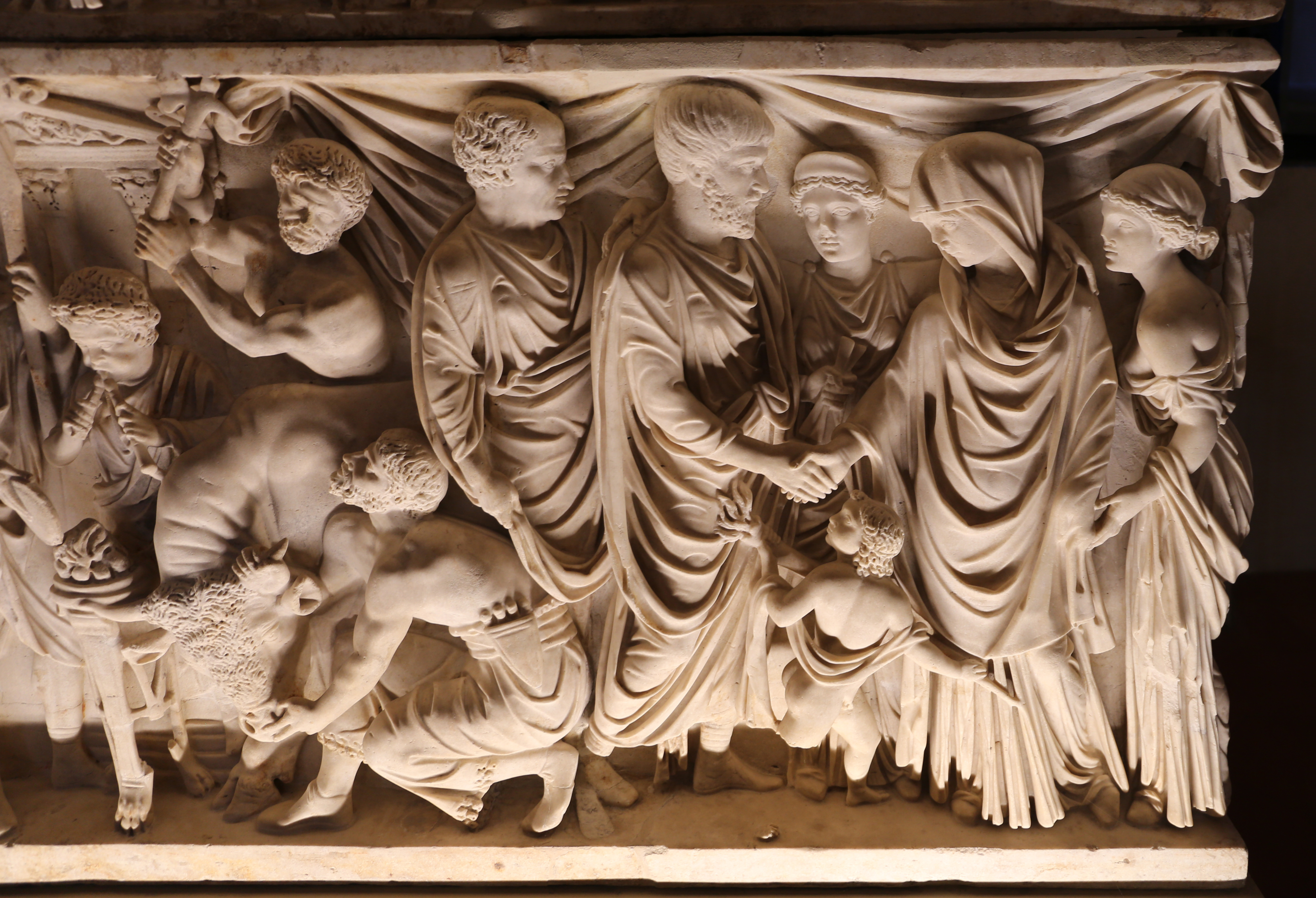
Marriage scene from a Roman sarcophagus dated to around 170 CE

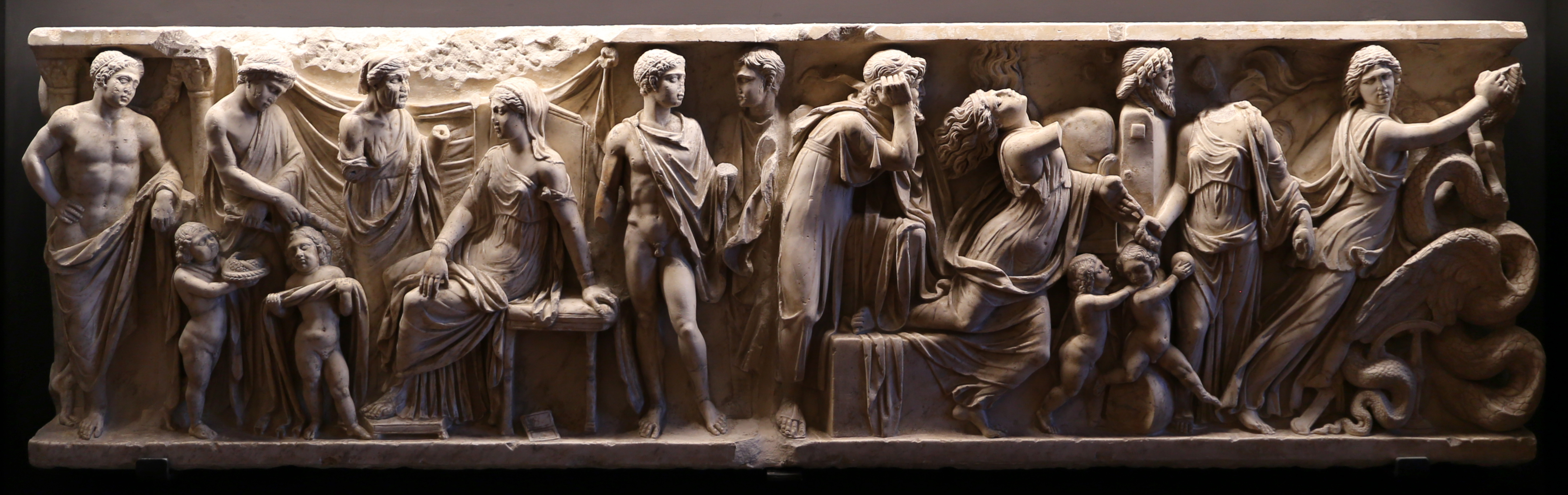
Sarcophagus from Mantua depicting the legend of Medea

The precise color of the flammeum is unclear, Lucan claims that it was of the luteus color and that it was used to shield the bride's shame and blushing, or pudor. This implies that either the veil was red, thus concealing the reddish blushing, or that it was thick enough to hide the skin underneath. The interpretation of the flammeum as red is supported by a later scholiast of Juvenal, who describes the veil as sanguine and resemblant of blood. However, Pliny the Elder, who stated that the color luteus was often used for bridal veils, compares this color to egg-yolk as luteum, implying that the color may have been orange-yellow shade. Festus mentions that the flammeum was worn by the Flaminica Dialis, the priestess and wife of Jupiter. He claims that the covering was the same color as the lightning of Jupiter, indicating that it was much closer to a yellow color than a red shade. Luteus is also used as an adjective for the bride, not just the flammeum: Catullus describes a bride whose face is "luteus as a poppy." Such a description conforms to a trend in Roman literature of depicting the blushing of the bride, as well as a general lack of yellow poppies, although only if it is assumed that the color luteus is reddish. Classicist Robert J. Edgeworth concluded that the word luteus may mean either pink or yellow depending upon the context.

Evidence from Roman literature suggests that the veil either entirely or almost entirely masked the bride's appearance: In the play Casina by Plautus, the plot requires that a male slave be effectively disguised as a female bride and Ovid describes a myth in which the god Mars is tricked into wedding the goddess Anna Perenna under the impression that he was marrying Minerva. However, wedding depictions in Roman artwork typically portray the faces of the brides uncovered, possibly because the artists wanted to ensure the viewers could recognize their faces or due to difficulty depicting a translucent material. Two examples of sarcophagi from the around 180 CE depict brides with their veils drawn so far back that their hair is visible. However, another sarcophagus dating to 170 CE shows the bride with her veil pulled forwards and her head tilted downward, possibly in a submissive pose; her face is visible, although not as clearly as the other sarcophagi. Wedding scenes from a sarcophagus dated to 380–390 CE portray a bride with a towering veil; the veil is large enough to make her appear taller than her husband, presumably because it covers an intricate bridal coiffure underneath. One of the scenes from this sarcophagus portrays the woman with a cloak covering each shoulder and, like the other sarcophagi, drawn over the base of her throat.

Jan Radicke argues that many artistic depictions portray the flammeum not as a veil, but as instead a "bridal scarf." For instance, a sarcophagus from Mantua portraying the story of Medea depicts Creusa, the bride of Jason, wearing a scarf that falls back on her head and covers the shoulders. Another Roman wedding depiction, this time from a late-Republican gravestone for Aurelia Philematium and her husband, portrays the bride with a scarf attached to her hair. In the Villa Imperiale, a fresco depicts a woman that may tentatively identified as the bride with an orange scarf. He further cites a passage from the 2nd-century BCE Roman author Caecilius Statius: "That yesterday he'd looked in from the roof, had this announced, and straight the flammeum was spread." In this passage, the flammeum is displayed within the house to signal that the wedding is going to occur soon. Radicke argues that it is more likely that the Romans would display a larger scarf rather than a small veil. Radicke cites another passage from Catullus in which the author describes the god Hymen—presumably—dressed like a bride. Catullus states that Hymen wears both the flammeum, and has their head covered by a wreath made from marjoram.

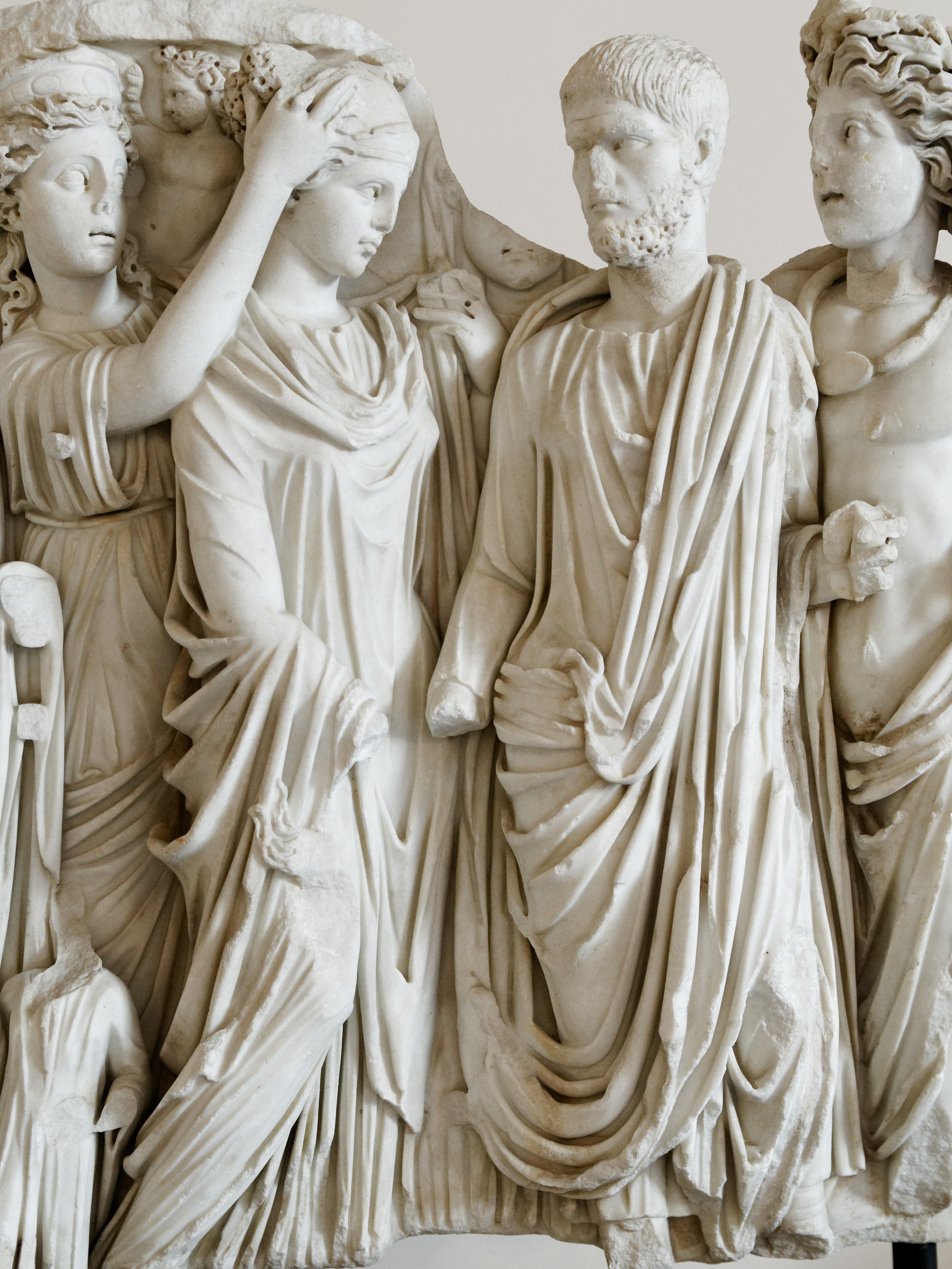
Scene from the Sarcophagus of the Brothers in which a woman is crowned

==== Wedding crowns ====
Festus mentions that Roman brides wore a piece of headgear called the corolla, a crown made of herbs, flowers, and foliage personally handpicked by the bride. This account is supported by artistic evidence: the "Sarcophagus of the Brothers," an ancient Roman sarcophagus stored in Naples, depicts a ceremony in which a woman identified as Venus crowns either a bride or an already married wife with a garland of flowers. Other accounts of wreaths in other Roman depictions of wedding ceremonies portray the corolla as a piece of groomal attire: Plautus and Apuleius both mention grooms wearing crowns of an unspecified material and Statius depicts a groom with a crown made from roses, lilies, and violets.

Another "towering crown" called the Corona Turrita, which is exclusively mentioned in the works of Lucan, is attested for as bridal gear by a later scholiast commentating upon his works. Whereas the original text only mentions a matron bedecked with the Corona Turrita, the scholiast refers to this individual as a bride. Baltic German archaeologist Hans Dragendorff argued that this type of crown connected to an ancient tradition of depicting goddesses such as Aphrodite or Astarte with large pieces of headgear. Dragendorff cites the 1st-century BCE Roman scholar Varro, who described the goddess Hera in bridal clothes; he also invokes a passage from Synesius, a 4th-century Greek bishop who claimed that brides wore crowns like those that adorned the goddess Cybele. Furthermore, Dragendorff proposed that these depictions, if not accurately reflective of Roman bridal gear by the lifetime of the authors, likely were distant memories of an ancient Italian-Greek bridal custom.

Although the commentary of the scholiast indicates that the Corona Turrita was indeed bridal gear, Karen Hersch rejects this analysis. Hersch argues that the interpretation of the scholiast is likely inaccurate as Roman authors never refer to a bride as a matrona and that it is unlikely Lucan would utilize the terms matrona and nupta interchangeably to describe the same character. Furthermore, there are no other instances of a "Corona Turrita" occurring as a bridal instrument in Roman literature. Hersch also rejects the proposal of Dragendorff, arguing that there is not sufficient evidence to connect goddesses such as Cybele to wedding rituals.

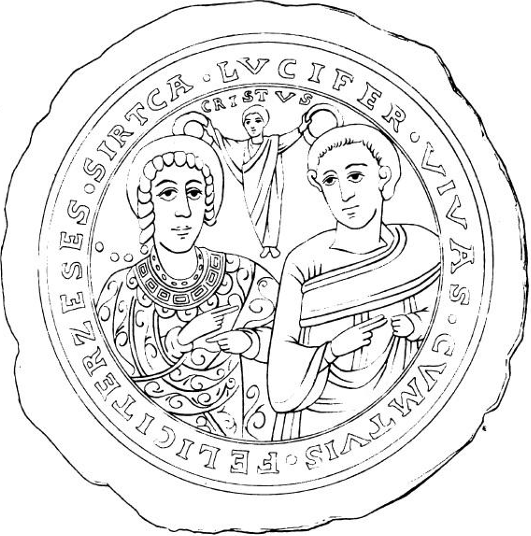
Drawing of a gold glass vessel depicting a married couple and Christ, located above them, placing crowns upon their heads

By the 4th-century, Christian art depicting weddings often portrays Christ offering crowns to the wedding couple. This practice was heavily criticized by contemporary Christian authors, who viewed it as a custom marred by pagan traditions. Tertullian argues that marriage "decks the bridegroom with its crown; and therefore we will not have heathen brides, lest they seduce us even to the idolatry with which among them marriage is initiated." However, such texts also imply that the practice was popular amongst Christians: Tertullian opens his essay, De Corona ("On the Crown"), by describing a situation in which Christian soldiers were offered laurel crowns, and only one refused. Furthermore, he declares that the intention of his writing was as an invective against "the laurel-crowned Christians themselves."

Tertullian was not alone in his sentiments, the 2nd-century Christian theologian Clement of Alexandria and the 3rd-century writer Minucius Felix both condemn the practice: Clement expresses that "The use of crowns and ointments is not necessary for us; for it impels to pleasures and indulgences, especially on the approach of night" and Felix, writing from the perspective of a fictional character named Octavius, responds to the accusation that Christians refuse to adorn their heads with flower garlands due to their fear of the pagan Gods by stating "Pardon us, forsooth, that we do not crown our heads; we are accustomed to receive the scent of a sweet flower in our nostrils, not to inhale it with the back of our head or with our hair."

It is possible, however, that the perspective of these authors was outdated by the 4th century, with the fears of paganism or idolatry associated with these customs dissipating over time. Gregory of Nazianzus, writing in the 4th-century, advises the bishop Eusebius to, during a wedding, allow the father—possibly the father of the bride—to "impose the crowns." John Chrysostom, the Archbishop of Constantinople in the 4th-century, claims that the wedding garlands functioned as "symbols of victory" that signify that the bride and groom are able to "approach the marriage bed unconquered by pleasure. The scholar Mark D. Ellison suggests that the prevalence of crowns in Christian nuptial rites may be connected to associations between crowns and temperance in the New Testament, with Paul mentioning that "every one that contends for a prize is ἐγκρατεύομαι ["enkrateúomai," "temperate, also used in a sexual context"] in all things: they indeed then that they may take a corruptible στεφᾰ́νου ["stéphanos," "crown"], but we an incorruptible." Ellison further cites other sections from the New Testament which references crowns of, according to him, "eternal reward:" for instance, the "στέφᾰνος ["stéphanos"] of righteousness" mentioned as a reward the Second Epistle to Timothy. Although the sources often indicate a connection between sexual moderance and the crowns, Ellison argues that this iconography instead functions to publicly display the couple's religious merit, thereby depicting them as "spiritual victors."

=== Groomal clothing ===
There is limited information regarding the groomal attire as Roman authors tended to focus on describing the bride, leaving only scant descriptions of groomal clothing available to modern scholars. Whereas the bride is often identifiable due to various pieces of clothing, such as the flammeum or sex crines, the groom is never recognized by their choice of garb. Classicist Karen Hersch assumes that the groom likely wore clean clothes, "probably a toga if he owned one," however Lucan mentions that Cato the Elder maintained an "untended beard" during his wedding. This dearth of detail could represent the difference between the symbolism of the wedding ceremony for the bride and the groom: the wedding seemingly functioned as a coming-of-age ritual for the bride, but likely lacked such significant symbolism. It is possible that, for a Roman boy, their coming-of-age ceremony occurred before the wedding, when they relinquished their bulla and toga praetexta, and donned their toga virillis. Boys usually started wearing togae virilles around puberty, or when the boy's parents believed he was sexually mature. The bulla was dedicated to Lares, household spirits and guardian deities in Roman religion. Arnobius describes a practice—which supposedly occurred long before the life of Arnobius—in which Roman girls surrendered their togulae (or "little togas") to Fortuna Virginalis before the wedding. The epithet "Virginalis" is exclusively given to Fortuna by Arnobius. Another, similar practice is mentioned by the 1st-century Roman poet Persius, who describes Roman girls offering their dolls to Venus. In another account by a scholiast of Persius, it is mentioned that this practice occurred an unspecified amount of time prior to the wedding. Pseudo-Acro, a scholiast of the poet Horace, mentioned a custom of girls and boys dedicating their bullae and dolls respectively, although he claims the items were offered to the Lares and makes no mention any connection with the Roman wedding.

== Customs ==
=== Ideal bride and groom ===
The Roman wedding was designed to ensure the legitimate transfer of the bride into a legal marriage. In Rome, the ideal bride was supposed to lack prior sexual experience and be simultaneously frightened and joyful about the upcoming wedding. Depictions of the Roman wedding emphasize the misery and fear of the bride; literary accounts sometimes describe the tears and blushes beneath the bridal veil and artistic portrayals depict brides with turned town faces or eyes. Catullus, a 1st-century BCE Latin poet, describes the bride as "eager for her new husband," but also as sobbing because "she must go." In an epithalamium by the 4th-century CE poet Claudian, the bride is explicitly commanded by Venus to love her husband despite her initial fear of the wedding: Venus instructs her, "whom you now fear you will love."

The imagery of a suffering bride may have exaggerated for artistic purposes, although it is also possible that real Roman brides did indeed feel significant discomfort as the wedding marked a transitory period in their lives in which they were separated from their family. However, marriage was a pivotal time in the lives of Roman women; there was tremendous social pressure to become married and women were raised with this pressure surrounding them. Thus, it is possible that Roman women in reality faced little sadness at the thought of the wedding ceremony as it was a normalized aspect of Roman culture. Catullus himself appears to recognize the sorrow of the bride as insincere, exclaiming that "Their groans are untrue, by the gods I swear!" and asking if "the parents' joys turned aside by feigned tears, which they shed copiously within the threshold of the bedchamber?" Wasdin argues that Roman literature often fetishizes the idea of resistance to sex or a feigned unwillingness to partake in intercourse: Ovid states "Perhaps she will struggle at first, and cry “You villain!” yet she will wish to be beaten in the struggle." However, Wasdin argues that the violence is justified within Roman literature by the supposed artificiality of the bride's dismay, noting that in other pieces of Roman spousal violence is explicitly condemned: Tibullus exclaims that he "would not wish to strike thee, Delia [his lover], but if such madness come to me, I would pray to have no hands."

Little attention was paid to the autonomy or will of the bride in Roman wedding rituals: Catullus instructs the bride to avoid displeasing her husband, stating "You also, bride, what your husband seeks beware of denying, lest he go elsewhere in its search." In another section of the Carmina of Catullus, a bride is told to obey their husband as her father has arranged the marriage, and that rightful ownership of their virginity is split in thirds between their father, mother, and themselves. Catullus utilizes a litany of floral or natural metaphors to describe the bride and the wedding couple, portraying the bride as "shining with a florid face" ("ore floridulo nitens") and appearing like a "yellow poppy" ("luteumve papauer") and a "white chamomile" ("alba parthenice"). Classicist Vassiliki Panoussi argues that such depictions impart a sense of intimacy, passivity, and vulnerability onto the bride, citing in particular the use of the diminutive "floridulo" and the connection between the term "parthenice" and the Greek word "παρθένος" ("parthénos," "maidenly, chaste"). In another part of the text, the bride is equivocated to a hyacinth in the garden of a rich man. Panoussi interprets these portrayals as a form of objectification of the bride, reducing her to a piece of ornamentation used to display the splendor of her husband's household, the same way the flower is used to decorate the garden. Furthermore, Catullus emphasizes the supposed power and prestige of the groom's home, describing the abode as "powerful" ("potens") and "prosperous" ("beata").

Catullus continues the floral metaphors, emphasizing the bride's affection for the groom by comparing her to ivy, stating "as the soft vine enfolds the nearby trees, he will be enfolded in your embrace." The notion of the wedding as the precursor to an ultimately felicitous union is upheld by the chorus of boys in Catullus 62, who—while disputing the merits of marriage with a chorus of girls—compare the wedding to joining a plant with an elm, thereby enhancing the plant's fertility and permitting it to benefit from the "ripest of seasons." Although the girls liken the wedding to destroying said flower, the chorus of boys states that, by this procedure, the bride becomes dearer to the groom and less hateful to her father. However, Panoussi argues that these poems imply that the supposed fortunate of the union was contingent upon the submission of the bride to male authority: the marriage contracts noted in the text are signed exclusively by men and the boys are unconcerned with the feelings of the bride, citing only that her husband and father will approve of the union. Panoussi states that the bride likely could retain some degree of agency through the importance conferred onto her by Roman social expectations: Catullus states that a virtuous Roman matron proves the value of their overall family ("genus"), that a bride is vital to produce the offspring needed to continue a family lineage, and he laments that without the bride assuming her role as a matron, then they could not give birth to children who could one day become soldiers and thus help uphold the Roman Empire. Within this framework, Panoussi argues that—at least within the poetry of Catullus—the conflict between the unpleasant nature of the wedding and its importance for overall society can be interpreted as an internal conflict between societal demands and personal aspirations, a conflict between the bride's desire to avoid such unpleasantness and their perceived calling within Roman culture to accept the responsibility of matronhood.

The ideal Roman groom was in many ways the opposite of the ideal bride: they were supposed to be both desirous of the wedding and sexually experienced. Statius, in one of his epithalamia, mocks Stella—the groom—for failing to act upon his love for Violentilla and take her as his bride, stating "Sigh no more, sweet poet, she is thine. The door lies open, and thou can come and go with fearless step." Catullus describes the groom as trembling during the wedding ("tremens"), however he also mentions that the groom listens to the ceremony with an "eager ear" ("cupida aure"). The writings of Catullus portray the groom as more sexually violent and aggressive, using the term "immineat" ("to threaten" or "to long for") to describe the groom lying in bed awaiting the bride; he further mentions that the groom's "passion" ("flamma") burns brighter than that of the bride. Claudian compares Honorius and his passion for his bride, Maria, to that of a sexually aroused horse, stating that Honorius was akin to "noble steed when first the smell that stirs his passions." Differing cultural attitudes towards the groom and the bride are reflected in the Latin language itself: brides were said to "nubere viro," or "to veil [themselves] for a man," while grooms were said to "ducere uxorem," or "to lead a wife."

=== Auspices and sacrifices ===
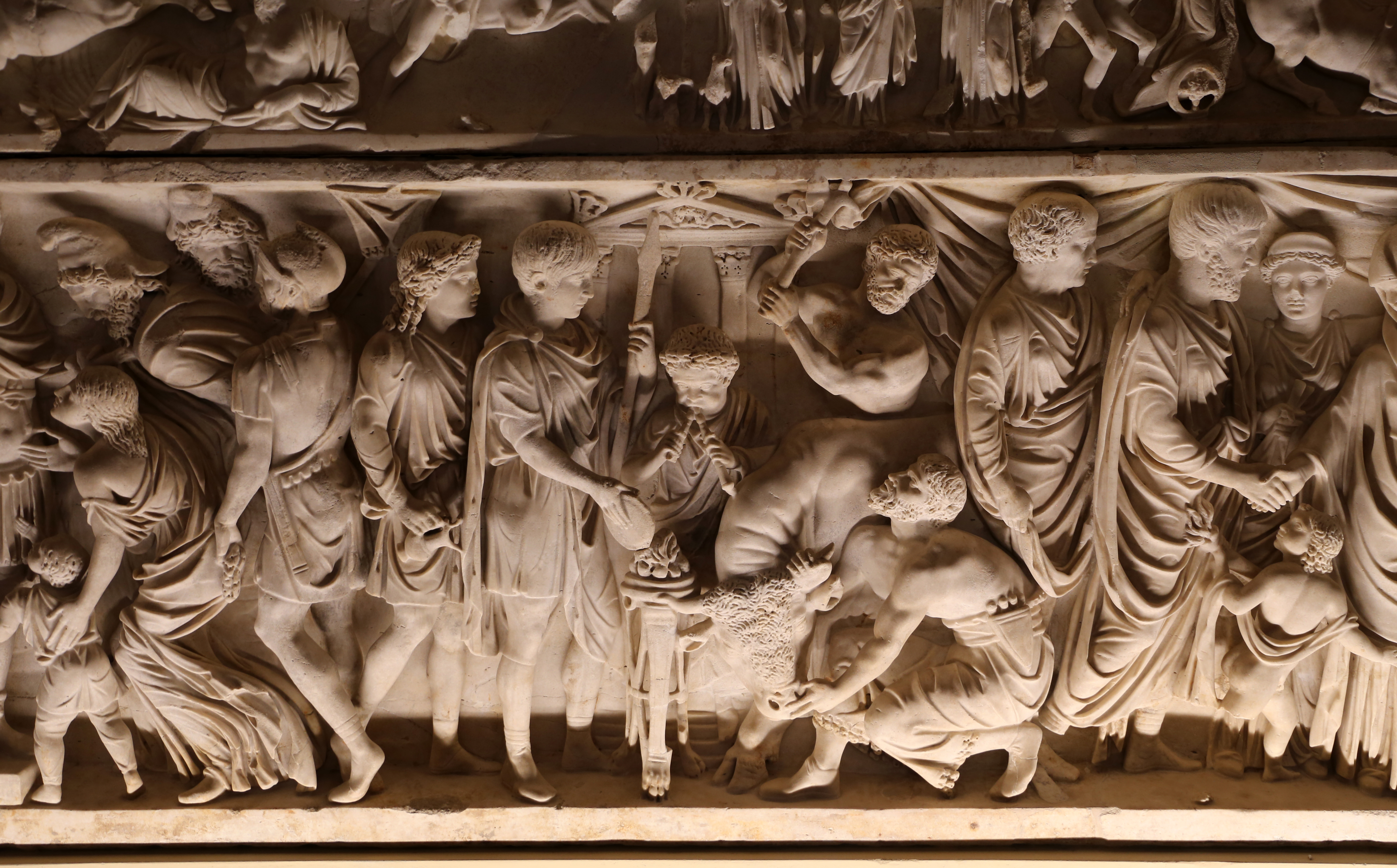
Scene from sarcophagus in Mantua that depicts the sacrifice of a bull as part of a wedding ceremony, dated to around 170 CE.

The taking of the auspices (auspicia) was possibly a necessary, or at least highly preferred, part of the Roman wedding. When describing wedding ceremonies, Roman authors frequently note either the presence of favorable omens or augurs at a wedding ceremony. For instance, Catullus describes an individual named Manlius wedding a virgin named Vinia while blessed by good omens and describes the Fates themselves offering prophecies at the wedding of Peleus and Thetis. Conversely, authors often describe the lack of such boons at doomed or improper weddings. In the Troades of Seneca, Helen of Troy laments that any wedding "bred of evil fate" and "full of joyless omens" is deserving of her "baleful auspices." Servius wrote that the thunder and lightning present at the wedding of Aeneas and Dido signified that their union would be unfortunate. In his Metamorphoses, Ovid writes that a screeching owl appeared at the wedding of Tereus and Procne, presumably signifying the impending transformation of Procne and Philomela into birds.

Cicero, writing in the 1st-century BCE, describes the practice of using augurs and diviners at weddings as if it had already become antiquated by his lifetime, mentioning that, although augurs still appeared in Roman weddings, they lacked the same religious significance. Other writings of Cicero imply that augurs or other officiating priests remained pivotal to the Roman wedding: he lambasts an individual named Sassia for marrying her son without anyone "to bless" or "to sanction the union" and amidst "nought but general foreboding." Valerius Maximus, a 1st-century CE Roman rhetorician, also reinforces the dated nature of augurs at Roman weddings, stating "Amongst the ancients nothing, either private or public, was held without auspices consulted." In his description of the various illegitimate weddings of Messalina and Nero, the 1st-century CE Roman historian Tacitus highlights the ritualistic taking of the auspices, possibly as part of an attempt to convey the debauchery of these figures. His account is almost certainly inaccurate as a piece of historical documentation; however, his writing may accurately reflect and convey the cultural values of his time, thus rendering it somewhat useful to modern historians. Whilst describing Nero as a licentious individual, Tacitus mentions that the emperor, alongside performing other components of the wedding ritual, also observed the auspices during his wedding to the freedman Pythagoras, in which Nero appeared as the bride. At the wedding of Messalina and Gaius Silius, Tacitus also mentions that they performed all the traditional rites of a Roman wedding, including the consultation of the auspices. Classicist Karen Hersch hypothesizes that Tacitus may have been infuriated that these individuals choose to include all the elements of a legitimate wedding within their own, in his opinion, perverted ceremonies. Hersch further suggests that, assuming the rituals were indeed antiquated by the time of Tacitus, he may have been illustrating the eccentricity of these figures by describing them using an ancient practice. Alternatively, as Tacitus more specifically states that Messalina had heard the words of the auspex, Hersch suggests that Tacitus may have been attempting to imply that she was failing to heed dire omens. Juvenal similarly satirizes the wedding of Messalina, claiming that she attempted to emulate a legitimate marriage by bringing along witnesses, an augur, and a wedding dowry of one million sesterces in the "ancient fashion." It is possible that Juvenal's emphasis on the "ancient fashion" is intended to induce outrage at a perceived defilement of the mos maiorum, or the customs and traditions of ancient Rome.

Varro claims that the "ancient kings" and "eminent persons" of the Etruscan civilization sacrificed pigs to sanctify treaties, including wedding rites. Varro believes that this custom was also adopted by the Latin tribes and the Greek inhabitants of Italy, and that remnants of this custom persisted in the usage of the term "porcus" as a slang term for female genitalia. Hersch argues that nuptial pig sacrifices may have ceased to occur by the early Empire due to lack of any artistic evidence for such a custom, despite the plethora of depictions of bulls and sheep on wedding scenes from sarcophagi. Servius, writing in the 4th or 5th centuries, treats the custom of animal sacrifice as an antiquated custom, claiming that "amongst the ancients no wife was able to be wed nor field able to be plowed without the sacrifices completed." Another reference to pre-nuptial animal sacrifice derives from the Aeneid: Queen Dido, prior to her wedding, attempts to acquire assistance from various deities by—in isolation—pouring a libation between the horns of a white cow and sacrificing sheep to Apollo ("Phoebus"), "lawgiving Ceres ("legiferae Cereri")," the "father Lyaeus ("patrique Lyaeo")," and, most importantly ("ante omnis"), Juno, who governs marriage bonds ("cui vincla iugalia curae"). Karen Hersch states that the precise details of Dido's involvement in this sacrifice remain unclear: Dido possibly personally scarified the animals, although the text also allows for the interpretation that she instead let priests perform the deed for her. Hersch proposes that Virgil may have intended to emphasize the "foreignness" of Dido, perhaps hoping to communicate that no Roman woman would similarly engage in a sacrifice. Alternatively, Virgil may have wished to emphasize the "doomed" nature of her wedding by showing Dido partake in an improper ritual. Sheep specifically are mentioned as part of the wedding ritual by Plutarch, who claims that, upon introducing the bride, the Romans would lay a fleece underneath her and then the bride would proceed to hang a thread of woolen yarn from her husband's door using a distaff and a spindle. However, in the Roman play Octavia, a bloodless sacrifice of material possessions is depicted, in which Poppaea Sabina, the second wife of Nero, coats an altar in wine and offers incense to unspecified gods. Other evidence from Roman literature indicates that the groom was primarily responsible for wedding sacrifices: In The Golden Ass of the 2nd-century writer Apuleius, a character called Tlepolemus travels through the city accompanied by his relatives to sacrifice at public shrines and temples prior to his wedding. Another account of a pre-nuptial sacrifice performed by the groom derives from the play Hercules Oetaeus by Seneca: In the play, Deianira—the wife of Hercules—becomes enraged upon hearing that Hercules would take another woman, Iole, as a new wife and prays to become the sacrificial victim, hoping that Hercules would kill her and that her corpse could fall upon the lifeless body of Iole.

==== Auspicious and Inauspicious dates ====
Roman authors recorded numerous dates in which it was considered ill-omened to wed; however, Hersch argues that such religious rules may not have necessarily concerned all, or even the majority, of Roman citizens. Hersch considers it unlikely that each individual Roman had detailed knowledge of the calendar, suggesting that—for most Romans—the intricacies of the calendar may have been inscrutable. Furthermore, Hersch argues that it is unlikely the Roman populace unanimously avoided performing any task on the days which Romans authors considered unlucky. Individual Romans would—according to Hersch—have been differently affected by religious matters; for instance, an urban resident in Rome may not have been concerned with agrarian omens. Many sources for these traditions were intentionally archaizing and thus may reflect traditions which had become antiquated by the author's lifetime: writers such as Ovid sought to catalogue the mythological origins for parts of Roman society and authors such as Varro and Festus were documenting rare and obscure words in the Latin language. Augustine critiques the entire notion of attempting to predict ill-fortune depending upon the wedding date, decrying the affair as "foolishness" ("stultitiam singularem") because—according to Augustine—individuals cannot change their destiny.

Macrobius. a 5th-century Roman historian, suggests that the Calends, Ides, Nones, and the days following the Nones, ought to be avoided for weddings because violence was forbidden on the dates—according to Festus, because Republican military leaders had suffered catastrophic defeats after supplicating the gods on these dates—and violence appeared to be committed against virgins during the wedding. Varro, according to Macrobius, stated that these dates, alongside any day of religious observance ("feriae") were more favorable for the weddings of widows than virgins because it was considered more favorable to clean out old drainage ditches than dig new ones during these days. Days associated with death were considered unlucky days for a wedding: the days of mundus patet ("the world is open"), in which the spirits of the dead ("manes") were believed to walk the earth; the Parentalia, in which feasts were held in honor of the dead; and Lemuria, in which the Romans performed rituals to excise malevolent spirits of the dead from their homes, were all considered inauspicious for weddings. Ovid claims that women who wed during the Lemuria festival were expected to not live much longer and that the general public of Rome, the vulgus ("common folk"), believed that "bad women" ("malas") wed in May due to its connections with the festival. Other holidays are mentioned as inhospitable for weddings: Plutarch states that men refused to wed throughout the entire month of May, a tradition that is possibly connected to Lemuria or the festival of the Argei, both of which occurred in May. Plutarch alternatively proposes that men wished to delay the wedding until June because the month was considered more favorable for weddings due to its connections with Juno. Ovid mentions that they were ill-advised on the festival of the Salii, who were priests of Mars, due to the presence of weapons at the festival and because "fighting is unsuitable for marriage." There is only scant evidence for any propitious wedding dates. Ovid mentions that the Ides of June was advantageous ("utilis") for brides and bridegrooms although the "first part" of the month was considered unpropitious ("aliena") for couples because—according to the Flaminica Dialis in a conversation with Ovid—these dates occur before the Vestalia had concluded, thus occurring before the Temple of Vesta was cleaned and while Flaminica was still forbidden from cutting her nails with iron, combing her hair with a comb made from boxwood, or touching her husband the Flamen Dialis. The Flaminica concludes by advising Ovid that his daughter "will better wed when Vesta’s fire shall shine on a clean floor."

=== Domum deductio ===
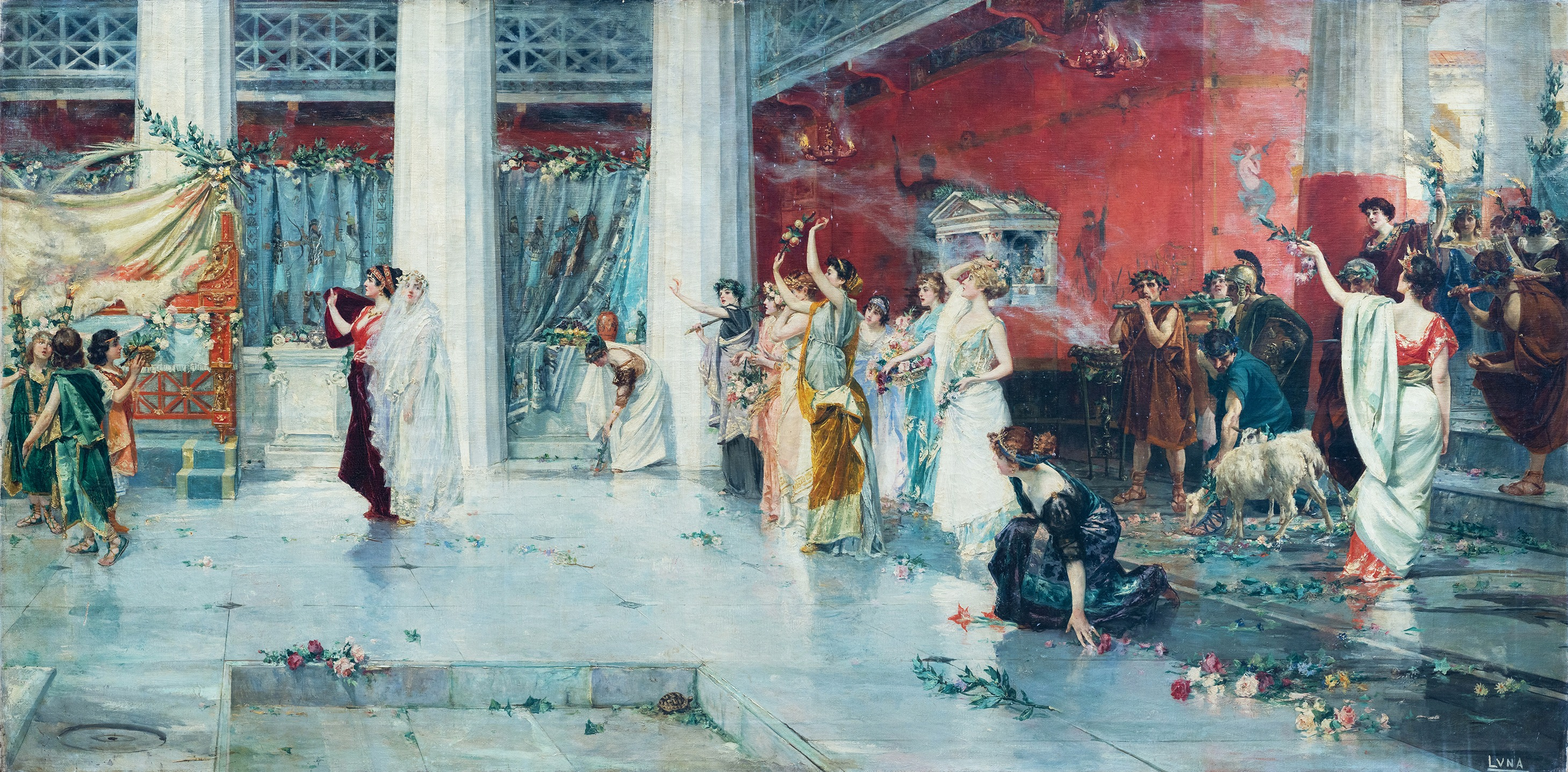
Hymen, oh Hyménée, 19th-century painting by Juan Luna depicting the Roman wedding ceremony

The Roman wedding incorporated a ceremony called the "domum deductio" ("leading to the home"), which functioned as a ritualistic public kidnapping of the bride from her home to the house of the groom, possibly intended to demonstrate the wealth and prestige of the families involved as well as provide conclusive proof that the wedding had occurred. According to Festus, the ceremony involved seizing the bride from her mother's "gremium" (meaning either "lap" or, figuratively, "embrace"), or—if her mother was not present—the next closest female relative, and then transferring her over to the groom. This claim is further substantiated by accounts from Claudian, who describes the bride Celerina also being pulled from her mother's "gremium" by the goddess Cytherea, another name for Aphrodite. It is unclear at precisely which time the taking of the bride occurred: the groom is not mentioned accompanying the bride on her journey to the new house, leading Hersch to propose that the seizing did occur until the bride had already arrived at the home of the groom. Hersch supports her interpretation with a passage from Catullus in which he describes Hesperus, the evening star (which itself is the planet Venus in the evening), stealing the bride from her family. The bride was expected to at least feign fear of the wedding ceremony and despondency at the prospect of marriage. Hersch argues that by demonstrating a reluctance to abandon their homes, the bride was signifying that they had, prior to the wedding, "lived a cloistered life among her female relatives" and therefore was a chaste bride suitable to become a wife. Hersch cites the lack of the bride's "father or male guardian" at the seizing of the bride, which—in Hersch's opinion—reinforced the absence of men from the bride's life and consequently her virginity. Hersch further proposes that since the flammeum likely either completely or almost completely veiled the bride's face, they may have been forced to convey their discontent through mime—more specifically, Hersch suggests such performance could have included loud crying, hanging the head dejectedly, and walking with visible trepidation. The overall purpose of this ritual—according to Hersch—was to reinforce a sense that the bride was in some way alienated from the family of the groom, that they were a permanent outsider only brought into the new family by force. Hersch argues that this cultural attitude is further reflected by the conventions of Roman nomenclature, according to which girls were not obligated to adopt the name of their husband; Hersch suggests that, collectively, these practices served to establish a sense of separation between the bride and the groom's family.

Macrobius notes that, during weddings, maidens were most vulnerable to suffering violence; he describes this violence with the word "vim" (meaning "force" or "assault"), a term which is also used by the 1st-century Roman historian Suetonius to describe the wailing and lamentation of Nero, who, during his wedding to the slave Doryphoros (who is himself potentially identical to Pythagoras), was attempting to imitate the cries of "suffering virgins." Furthermore, this term was connected to the notion of forceful sex, or rape, in various Roman writings, with the author Augustine etymologically connecting the name Venus to the violence of Roman wedding ceremonies, declaring that Venus is called as such because "without violence ("sine vi") a woman does not cease to be a virgin." Physical violence is described in the play Casina, in which the slave Olympio notes that when he entered the bedroom with the bride. who is the slave Chalinus disguised as Casina, Chalinus physically assaulted him by kicking him off the bed and then pummeling his face. Despite the extreme reaction, Hersch notes that the groom does not find this behavior incongruent with that of an actual bride; he remains convinced that Chalinus is in fact Casina. Furthermore, the scholar Judith P. Hallett noted that—during this same bedroom scene in Casina—Olympio mentions that the bride blocked one "entrance," leading him to ask the bride to "let [him] enter through the other [one]." Hallett interprets this scene as referring to anal sex, which Hallett suggests may have been preferred by brides as it reduced the risk of injury to their bodies. Hallett cites another instance of a similar description from the Carmina Priapeia, a series of short poems dedicated to the god Priapus thought to have been composed during the 1st-century: the text mentions that virgins during their wedding night fear wounds in their "other place," which Hallett interprets as referring to a fear of a wound acquired through vaginal intercourse.

Despite the apparent omnipresence of this notion of a groom leading his wife, it is unclear if the groom physically led the bride during the ceremony: Roman literature provides few, if any, actual descriptions a groom genuinely leading the bride. Karen Hersch proposes that the "earliest forms of the Roman wedding" may have involved a literal leading of the bride that vanished from later versions of the Roman wedding ceremony, although the language describing the leading of the bride persisted. Hersch further theorizes that the absence of the groom could be partially explained by the potential origins of the Roman wedding in the Rape of the Sabine women, an event in Roman mythology in which Romulus kidnapped Sabine women and brought them to Rome as brides. According to Hersch, the evocation of the myth of the Sabine women was intended to convey to the bride that she singlehandedly had the capacity to bring "concordia," meaning "union" or "harmony," to the Roman marriage by emulating the submissiveness and loyalty the Sabine brides demonstrated to their newfound Roman husbands. Festus explicitly supports the interpretation of the domum deductio as a ritual originated from the Rape of the Sabine Women, declaring that the kidnapping was reenacted during the wedding ceremony as Romulus garnered great benefits from the rape of the Sabines. Dionysius of Halicarnassus, a 1st-century BCE Greek rhetorician, records that, after the rape, Romulus attempted to alleviate the despair of the captured girls by informing them that it was a Greek custom and the most illustrious manner of marriage for women, before imploring them to thank Tyche (the Greek equivalent of the Roman goddess Fortuna) for allotting them husbands.

The existence of ornaments decorating the groom's house in preparation for the arrival of the bride is strongly hinted at by the mention of their absence at the wedding of Cato and Marcia: Lucan claims that—at this wedding—no festal wreath crowned the gate, a gleaming infula was not entangled around the posts, ivory steps were not present, a wedding torch was not carried, the couch was not embroidered with gold, and the bride herself was not adorned with the wedding garland, the flammeum, a necklace ("monile"), or a jeweled girdle ("balteus") to confine her "flowing robe;" her arm was also not covered by a type of linen garment called a "supparum." Hersch claims that such opulence and decor, in particular the parts related to the bride, likely conveyed her value as the manager of domestic affairs. Claudian provides a separate account of wedding decoration in his description of the wedding of Honorius and Maria, mentioning that Venus declared that Concordia shall weave a garland, a Charis shall gather flowers for the banquet, and others shall entwine a doorpost with myrtle, spread the tapestries of Sidon, and unfold yellow-dyed silks. Furthermore, the wedding bed was said to have been furnished with the spoils of war garnered through campaigns against the various enemies of Rome and decorated with gemstones.

According to Pliny the Elder, pig's fat was sacred to the "ancients" and, during his lifetime, continued to be smeared upon doorposts by brides when they were entering the house of the groom. He also cites an author named Masurius, who claims that the "ancients" gave the "palm" to wolf fat and that, likewise, brides coated doorposts with wolf fat to safeguard themselves against any "evil medicine" ("mali medicamenti"). Servius similarly states that the fat and limbs of wolves were viewed as remedies for various medical ailments. Furthermore, Servius explains that this tradition derives from the myth of Romulus and Remus, the two legendary founders of Rome who were nursed by a she-wolf; he clarifies that these rituals were performed to ensure the bride knew that she was entering into a sacred household and because of the loyalty of the wolf, leading Karen Hersch to speculate that the tradition may have symbolized the faithfulness of the bride. Servius also claims that was considered a baleful omen for the bride to trample over the threshold ("limen") of the house, because it was the "thing of Vesta" ("rem Vestae") and therefore sacred. However, Ovid claims that the tradition is more associated with the god Janus, who exists as a character in Ovid's Fasti and declares that he guards the threshold. This tradition is also seemingly referenced by Catullus, who commands a bride to cross the threshold (also called a "limen") with "a good omen" and her "golden feet." In another one of Catullus's poems, he describes a lady standing upon this border with a worn-out shoe, potentially indicating—according to Karen Hersch—that this woman may have been of impure morality. In the play Casina by Plautus, the maid Pardalisca instructs the bride—the slave Chalinus disguised as Casina—to lift her feet over the threshold, explaining that this ritual must occur for her to always remain more powerful than the groom, to conquer him, and to despoil him. The historian Gordon Williams suggests that this speech was likely given by the mater familias Cleustrata and functioned as an intentional subversion of a legitimate Roman nuptial speech; therefore, he concludes that the inverse of these claims, the idea of a bride being subservient to their husband, must have been the genuine advice offered to the bride. Karen Hersch adds that the proposition of Williams is unprovable, and that—even if true—the wedding depicted in Casina may more accurately reflect Greek wedding customs than Roman practices. The Roman author Plutarch proposes that the ritual carried almost the opposite significance: that the bride was involuntarily carried across the border by other individuals, symbolizing either that she was unwilling to enter the house where she would lose her virginity or that she was unwilling to enter abandon her family and therefore needed to be forcefully brought into the new home.

According to various Roman sources, there was some mention of the names "Gaia" during the Roman wedding ceremony. Plutarch—the comprehensive source available on this matter—suggests that it occurred during the domum deductio, stating that when the bride was led to their new home, the phrase "Ubi tu Gaius, ego Gaia" ("Where you are Gaius, I am Gaia") was uttered. Hersch argues that Plutarch implies that the bride did not necessarily utter this phrase of her own volition, as he uses the verb "κελεύουσιν" ("keleúousin," "to urge, command") to describe the ritual. Furthermore, Hersch notes that the specific adverb used by Plutarch, "ὅπου" ("hópou," "where"), could be translated into a Latin either as "ubi" or "quando" (both of which could mean "when"), which Hersch suggests could convey significantly distinct meanings. Plutarch proposes two possible explanations for the ritual: one suggests that it may originated to suggest that the couple had equitable control over the household, and thus–in Plutarch's view—the phrase could be rendered as "Wherever you are lord and master, there I am lady and mistress." Alternatively, he indicates that the phrase derives from Gaia Caecilia, the name adopted by Tanaquil according to some Roman sources, who is herself inaccurately labeled by Plutarch as the wife of one of Tarquin the Elder's sons even though other Roman authors label her as the wife of Tarquin. Festus also cites Tanaquil as the origin of this tradition, adding that Roman brides honored Tanaquil—whose spindle and distaff were alleged by Pliny to have been stored in the Temple of Sancus—because they sought a good omen for their wool-working skills. According to Hersch, Plutarch further indicates that the names "Gaius" and "Gaia" may have functioned as placeholder names, equivalent to terms such as John or Jane Doe. Hersch suggests that the writings of the 1st-century CE rhetorician Quintilian carry a similar connotation, as they note that the names "Gaius" and "Gaia" were used at the wedding ceremony—in Hersch's view—"presumably to mean simply 'man and woman.'" Another reference to the name "Gaia" being invoked at weddings appears in the works of Cicero, who mocks overly pedantic lawyers by remarking those who excessive attention to semantics might believe that the bride is literally renamed "Gaia" after the type of Roman marriage known as "coemptio."

==== Legal status ====
This ritual has been interpreted as the defining moment of a Roman wedding, the moment in which the bride officially became a wife: Ulpian writes that the marriage has been complete when "ducta est uxor," meaning when the bride has been led, even if they have not entered the bedroom and lain with each other. However, Ulpian notes other, apparently contradictory circumstances in which the bride was led, but the marriage is not valid as the bride due to the young age of the bride, which prevented them from legally marrying. In one scenario a bride under the age of 12 commits adultery ("adulterium") after having undergone the domum deductio; Ulpian argues that, since she was too young to be considered a "uxor" ("wife"), she could not be prosecuted for adultery as a married woman, but she could be prosecuted as a "sponsa" (meaning "bride" or "betrothed woman," interpreted by the scholar Lauren Caldwell as the latter in this instance). Ulpian writes that this legal reasoning is premised upon ideals outlined by the Emperor Septimius Severus (r. 193–211). Caldwell argues that, although Ulpian concedes that the bride is not legally married, he implies that the ritual marks some variety of transition into adulthood or confirmation of engagement as he states that she is capable of choosing to commit the crime of "adulterium," which is described by the 2nd-century jurist Papinian as requiring extramarital sex with or by a married woman.

In another anecdote, Ulpian describes a scenario in which the bride underwent the domum deductio despite being of the age of 12, thereby being too young to legally marry. According to Ulpian, the 2nd-century jurist Salvius Julianus argued that, in this specific instance, gift-giving between the spouses was invalid as the girl is a "sponsa" ("betrothed woman") not an "uxor." However, Ulpian reasons that the "sponsalia" ("betrothal") was the determining factor regarding whether the gifts were valid: they were legitimate had the betrothal occurred and illegitimate had the betrothal not occurred. Caldwell interprets this description of a wedding with all the trappings of a standard Roman wedding ceremony but without accompanying legal validity, as evidence that, at least for the majority of the Roman populace, the wedding ceremony was not necessarily connected to Roman law governing legitimate marriages. Caldwell further proposes that the wedding ceremony may have served largely social, rather than legal, functions: the wedding may have served to publicly broadcast the marriage and thus functioned as a representation of the legal union, rather than its direct equivalent.

There appear to be various instances in Roman literature in which a wedding is described as lacking the presence of the groom: Papinian states that the groom, if he had been absent from a wedding in which the bride was led, was not entitled to claim any interests if the bride did not take any expense from his assets. Another account from the Digests, authored by the 2nd-century jurist Ulpian, mentions that another jurist, Cinna, recorded an incident in which an individual who married a woman whilst away and then perished while returning from dinner by the Tiber. However, the scholar Zuzanna Benincasa notes that the legal reasoning of Cinna, which implicitly accepts the possibility that one may "accept an absent wife" ("qui absentem accepit uxorem"), contradicts a separate ruling from the 2nd or 3rd century Roman jurist Julius Paulus that "an absent woman is not able to wed" ("femina absens nubere non potest"). Various possible explanations have been proposed to resolve this discrepancy; one theory proposes that a scribe may have been mistakenly wrote the accusative form "absentem" instead of the nominative form "absens," thereby altering the meaning of the text from describing an absent groom to an absent bride. The scholar Carlo Castello, although he accepted the potential transcription error, posited that the groom may have been present for the wedding feast in the house of the bride, and perished while returning to his home. Italian scholar of Roman law Edoardo Volterra argued for a different interpretation of the original text, arguing that although the scenario assumed the absence of the bride, it possessed a sense of mutual "affectio mairtalis" ("marital affection") that was confirmed by the relatives and friends of the bride, which ensured the legitimacy of the wedding. In the Digests of Justinian, the Roman jurist Pomponius states that, even if the groom is not present, the Roman marriage could still be valid if it is conducted through letters and the bride undergoes the domum deductio, because the home of the groom is the "abode of matrimony" ("domicilium matrimonii"). However, the domum deductio is seemingly absent from the wedding of Cato and Marcia as described in the Pharsalia of Lucan as well as the wedding of Pudentilla to Apuleius recounted in the autobiographical telling of Apuleius himself.

=== Fire and water ===
Dionysius of Halicarnassus, writing in the 1st-century BCE, claims that the marriages subsequent to the rape of the Sabine women were performed via a "communion of fire and water," a ritual which—according to Dionysius—remained prevalent "even down to [his] times." The earliest references to the presence of fire and water and the Roman wedding ceremony derive from the Augustan period, with the author Varro claiming that fire and water were the conditions of procreation and thus important in the wedding ceremony. Varro explains that fire was connected to masculinity due to an association with the semen and that water is feminine because the embryo swims in a fluid substance. According to Varro, Venus—presumably also referring to love as a concept—is necessary to overcome the opposing forces of fire and water and bring about the union of marriage.

Plutarch, among many other hypotheses, inquires as to whether fire and water were used at Roman weddings because they are imperfect when separated, since fire without water is arid while water without heat is inert and unproductive; however, when they brought together, Plutarch suggests that they produce a more ideal union symbolic of a more ideal life. Alternatively, he proposes that the substances represented that the couple would remain together even if they lacked anything other than fire and water to share with each other. Ovid, writing during the lifetime of Varro, suggests that, because the combination of fire and water contains the source of life, the "ancients" may have denied it to exiles and used it to mark new brides. However, he implies that this tradition continued to be practice during his lifetime as he uses the present tense to describe the creation of new brides.

Festus provides two separate possible explanations for this ritual: he states that the bride was sprinkled with water either so that she may approach her husband morally pure ("casta puraque") or to share the fire and water with him. Connotations of purity are also apparent in one of Plutarch's suggested explanations: Plutarch postulates that fire purifies and water cleanses, thus they were used to ensure the bride remained "pure and clean." Servius provides additional details on the nature of the ritual, claiming that the water was taken from a "pure fountain" ("puro fonte") by a most fortunate ("felicissimum") boy or girl and used to wash the bride's feet. He also mentions that lightning, which seemingly represents a type of fire at the wedding, was simultaneously considered by some to be an ill-omen and a propitious sign.

This tradition is also depicted in the legal comments of the 2nd-century CE jurist Scaevola, who notes that—if a couple divorced— then any gift of money made before the bride had "crossed over to the groom" (possibly referring to the domum deductio) and had been "accepted by water and fire," could not be demanded to be returned from the wedding dowry. Polish classicist Zuzanna Benincasa argued that this scenario was exceptional and does not necessarily reflect broader Roman customs: Scaevola was commenting upon a case in which the bride had been living in the house of the groom prior to the wedding day, removing the need for a domum deductio as the bride could not be led from one house to another. Benincasa suggests that Scaevola's legal reasoning may have been premised upon the idea that the usage of fire and water merely signified the conclusion of the domum deductio, henceforth it was the successor to the ritual in its absence.

=== Wedding torches ===
Although Plutarch claims that "neither more or less" than five torches were carried at the Roman wedding, he is unable to offer a definitive explanation for why this number was chosen. He proposes that it may connected the number of wedding deities: Zeus Teleios, Hera Teleia, Peitho, Aphrodite, and Artemis, whom—according to Plutarch—is often invoked by women in childbirth. Plutarch also suggests that the usage of torches stems from cultural associations between light and birth while the specific number of 5 derives from the maximum of 5 children Plutarch believed women were capable of having in one birth. Alternatively, Plutarch proposes that 5 was chosen because the indivisible nature of odd numbers, such as 5, precluded them from the symbolism of strife found in even numbers. Furthermore, 5 specifically is the combination of the first even number, 2, and the first odd number, 3; therefore, according to Plutarch, it represents a symbolic union akin to marriage. This claim is seemingly consistent with other depictions of odd and even numbers in Roman literature: For instance, Virgil once claims that "The god is pleased by the odd number" ("numero deus impare gaudet"). Another hypothesis posited by Plutarch is that it may derive from the Aediles, who had the right to possess more torches than the Praetors, who could only carry three. This claim is possibly connected to the Lex Ursonensis, a Roman law which mentions that Aediles are allowed to hold wax tapers called "cereos," a term similar to the word Plutarch claims is used to refer to the Roman wedding torches: "cereones" ("κηρίωνας"). Another possibility is that this relates to a claim asserted by Festus: that one wedding torch once honored the goddess Ceres. This insinuation, which is entirely unsupported by other texts, could—according to Karen Hersch—connect to the proposition of Plutarch as one of the original functions of the Aediles was to manage worship at the Temple of Ceres.

It is unclear exactly who held the wedding torches during Roman weddings: In his Eclogues, Virgil instructs the groom—an individual named Mopsus—to "cut fresh torches" because he must prepare for the arrival of the bride to his home. However, Seneca mentions Agripinna the Younger—the mother of Nero—carrying torches during the wedding of Octavia; Catullus commands young boys to lift up torches during one wedding ceremony. In Roman poetry, it was common for a mythical figure to be depicted carrying the torches: Catullus mentions the god Hymen shaking pine torches and Ovid describes either Juno or Hymen at propitious unions. Iphis, a woman raised as a man in Greek mythology, fell madly in love with Ianthe, another woman whom she was intended to wed, however this situation threatened to expose her true sex. Iphis laments the unfortunate nature of her predicament, including that she be the only woman to ever feel attraction towards another woman, leading the gods to respond to her cries by transforming her into a man. At the following wedding, the deities Venus, Juno, and Hymen are all present and congregate at the wedding torches. However, Ovid describes the furies bearing the torches at weddings for ill-omened couples: Canace, a Thessalian princess in Greek mythology who mothered a child with her own brother, exclaims that, although Hymen must flee with his wedding torches from her "nefarious home" ("tecta nefanda"), the Furies are permitted to enter so they could light her funeral pyre. Ovid mentions that both Hymen and Juno were absent from the wedding of Procne, an Athenian princess who murdered her child; instead, he claims that the furies brought wedding torches taken from funerals. According to Ovid, Procne and the Thracian king Tereus were wedded and conceived their child under this omen. Ovid also chooses to convey the doomed nature of a wedding if the wedding ritual is carried out improperly: Hymen arrives to the wedding of Orpheus and Eurydice with a displeased countenance and an unlit torch and the deity is described as fleeing from the wedding altars of Cydippe, an Athenian girl set to marry Acontius; Cydippe complains that Hymen has failed to light the torches and has carried them with a lazy hand. In the Thebaid, Statius conveys the unlucky nature of a wedding by highlighting the presence of Hymen and an "ill-omened Juno" ("infausta Iuno") with an "inauspicious torch" ("sinistram facem"). Martial appears to invoke Hymen as a blessing for his friends in one of his letters: While describing the wedding of Claudia Peregrina and Pudens, he declares "A blessing for your torches, o Hymen!" According to Hersch, Festus's unique claim that one wedding torch formerly honored Ceres may derive either from Ceres's connections to fertility, and therefore the potential to bring fertility to the bride, or her absence from the wedding of her daughter—Proserpina—to Pluto as the author Servius mentions that brides must honor Ceres because, after the abduction, the goddess cursed brides ("nupturas exsecratur"). However, Servius notes another viewpoint held by his contemporaries: others claimed that Ceres looked favorably upon wedding because she was the first to wed Jupiter and helped build great cities, he cites another author—1st-century BCE orator Calvus—who claims that, in addition to the aforementioned reasons, Ceres also helped teach humanity the "sacred laws."

Pliny the Elder also refers to a "spina" ("thorn") that is the "most auspicious of all the nuptial torches" ("nuptiarum facibus auspicissima"), because—according to another author named Masurius—they were once used by the shepherds who participated in the rape of the Sabine women. This torch is likely related to the torch of "spina albina" ("white thorn," presumably the whitethorn plant) described by Festus, who claims that during the wedding one of the patrimi and matrimi carried such a torch while two others carried a bridal torch because the ceremony used to occur at nighttime. Festus adds that this torch was confiscated by friends to prevent the groom from burning it in a sepulcher or both the bride and the groom (for the groom, specifically at night) from placing the torch underneath the wedding bed because, according to Festus, both acts were thought to bring premature death to one another. Ovid implies that the torch may have had an apotropaic function, stating that the nymph Cranae was given a white thorn by Janus so that she could "repel all doleful harm from doors." Although Festus describes the torches in the present tense, indicating the tradition was contemporary to his lifetime, Varro—as recorded by the 4th or 5th century grammarian Nonius Marcellus—uses the imperfect past tense to describe the whitethorn torches, indicating the opposite. Varro claims that—of the two torches used during the wedding—one was lit by the bride using fire from her household hearth and the other was whitethorn and carried by a freeborn boy. Despite the apparent prevalence of whitethorn torches in the Roman wedding during some part of Roman history, other authors mention torches made of various different materials: Servius writes that the cornel tree was used to create wedding torches and other authors, often in poetry, mention pine as the source of nuptial torches. Aside from the previously mentioned description by Catullus, Seneca mentions Medea, a Greek mythological figure, carrying a pine torch and the "bridesmaid's torch into the bedroom" ("pronubam thalamo feram"). Seneca, in the same text, mentions the god Hymen kindling pine torches shortly prior to the Fescennine Verses.

=== Wedding chants ===
==== Fescennine Verses ====
The Fescennine Verses, known in Latin as the "Fescennini versus" or, alternatively, the "Fescennina iocatio" ("Fescennine Joke"), were a set of lewd and derisive songs performed during the Roman wedding ceremony. These songs were likely intended to ridicule the bride or the groom by highlighting embarrassing details of the individual's lives: In the Controversiae of the 1st-century BCE writer Seneca the Elder, an individual criticizes an acquaintance's decision to award one of his slaves with freedom and his daughter's hand in marriage, stating that during the Fescennine verses it will be joked that the groom would be crucified. However, the 2nd-century rhetorician Calpurnius Flaccus indicates that the groom could pronounce their own verses: Flaccus, while disputing the idea that a child born of rape should not be considered the son of the rapist, remarks that "if he does not kindle the torches and sing the Fescennine verses, then he is not able to be the father." Festus further mentions another type of abusive song called the "sermo praetextus," which were directed towards the bride; he claims that this tradition originates either from a supposed tendency of young boys to shout obscene language towards the bride who had discarded the toga praetexta.

The origins of these songs are unclear: Horace claims that they derived from earlier "ancient farmers' ("Agricolae prisci"), who had a custom of—after the grain harvest—propitiating tutelary deities by offering a pig for the Earth, milk for Silvanus, and flowers and wine for memory of their short lives. Horace further claims that the offensiveness of the verses led to the enactment of a law designed forbidding the songs, which was enforced by "terror of the cudgel" ("formidine fustis"). Lucan implies that the verses were Sabine in origin, mentioning that the "morose husband did not receive the festal abuses by the Sabine custom." Livy, on the other hand, attributes the origin of the song to the Etruscans: he claims that Etruscan actors used to perform the Fescennine verses. Servius states that the songs derive from an Athenian people and the 3rd-century philosopher Porphyry, while commenting upon the works of Horace, claims that the Fescennine Verses were called "Atellan." Festus notes that the songs were designed to repel the fascinus, a type of apotropaic phallic symbol in ancient Rome; he further suggests that the two terms were etymologically connected. The phallic imagery of the fascinus is, according to Karen Hersch, possibly connected to the aforementioned agrarian origins of the verses through the form of some variety of fertility ritual. If the Fescennine verses did indeed have a connection to fertility rituals, then it is possible its inclusion in the Roman wedding was motivated by a desire to bring fertility to the wedding couple. However, according to Hersch, this theory appears incongruent with the existence of Fescennine songs that had no connection to sexually explicit themes or lyrics.

Pliny the Elder mentions that walnuts accompanied the Fescennine verses during weddings, citing two possible explanations: either because the protective shell of the nut signified the protection of offspring—the argument Pliny finds the most convincing—or because the noise the nuts made when thrown upon the floor constituted a good omen. Servius opts for the former explanation of the tradition, claiming that—according to his source: Varro—it was believed that the nuts were under the protection of Jupiter and that the rattling noise of children yearning for the nuts would drown out the noise of the bride losing her virginity on the wedding night. Festus supports the latter interpretation of the ritual, explaining that the custom of throwing nuts to boys at the wedding emerged because the nuts constituted an auspicious sign for the bride upon entering the home of the groom.

==== Thalasssio and feliciter ====
According to Livy, the Romans would chant "Thalassio" during weddings as, during the rape of the Sabine Women, a girl "conspicuous among them for all her grace and beauty" was designated for an individual named Thalassius, and thus, to uphold his claim, the Romans chanted "Thalassio" (meaning "for Thalassius"). Servius also connected the chant to the myth of the Sabine women, claiming that Thalassius was invoked as a protector of virginity, because—during the rape of the Sabine women—he aimed to prevent others for capturing the girl by pretending she was of a noble leader, by whose name her virginity was safeguarded. Plutarch inquired into the origins of this chant in his Quaestiones Romanae, theorizing that it may either derive from the aforementioned possibilities or that it may derive from wool-spinning; he cites the similarity between Thalassio and the Greek word "τάλαρος" (meaning "wool-basket"), the custom of spreading a fleece underneath the bride, and of using a distaff and a spindle to hang a woolen yarn from the door of the husband's house. Festus supports this argument, stating that the term "talassio" (Festus and his source, Varro, spell the word like Talassio instead of Thalassio) derived from a type of basket called the "quassilus" which was the equivalent of the calathus, a type of basket involved in wool-working. Catullus describes the groom serving an entity called Talasius, likely a personification or deification of Talassius or the "Thalassio" chant. Martial similarly personifies the chant, while describing the usage of the cry at a wedding ceremony, he directly addresses the entity of Talassius himself: "nor were the words of thy song, Talassius, unheard." Despite this singular reference to Talassius, Martial exclusively uses the standard term for the chant, "Talassio," throughout the rest of his writings. Karen Hersch interprets this abnormality as an intentional discrepancy or inaccuracy designed to highlight the unconventional nature of the wedding, which was a homosexual union between two men: Callistratus and Afer. Both Plutarch and Servius connect this chant to the Greek tradition of invoking Hymen during their weddings, with Servius more specifically citing that Hymen was also supposedly invoked as a defender of virginity. It is unclear whether Thalassio was sung, shouted, or chanted: Although Plutarch claims that it was sung, Livy refers to it as the "nuptialem vocem," literally meaning "nuptial voice" or, more figuratively, "nuptial chant." Accounts from Martial imply that there were multiple words involved in the chant, as he refers to the "verba" ("words") of the cry in the plural; in one section of his Epigrams, he ridicules the idea of removing profanity from his works, stating "You might as well order me to say Talassio without using the words of Talassio." Petronius, a 1st-century Roman author, mentions that during a wedding ceremony the entire household ("familia") began chanting "Gaio feliciter" ("Good luck for Gaius"). Juvenal implies that the interjection "feliciter" was uttered at some point during the wedding ceremony; he mentions it alongside a list of other events that occurred at the wedding, such as the signing of the tablets.

==== Hymenaei ====
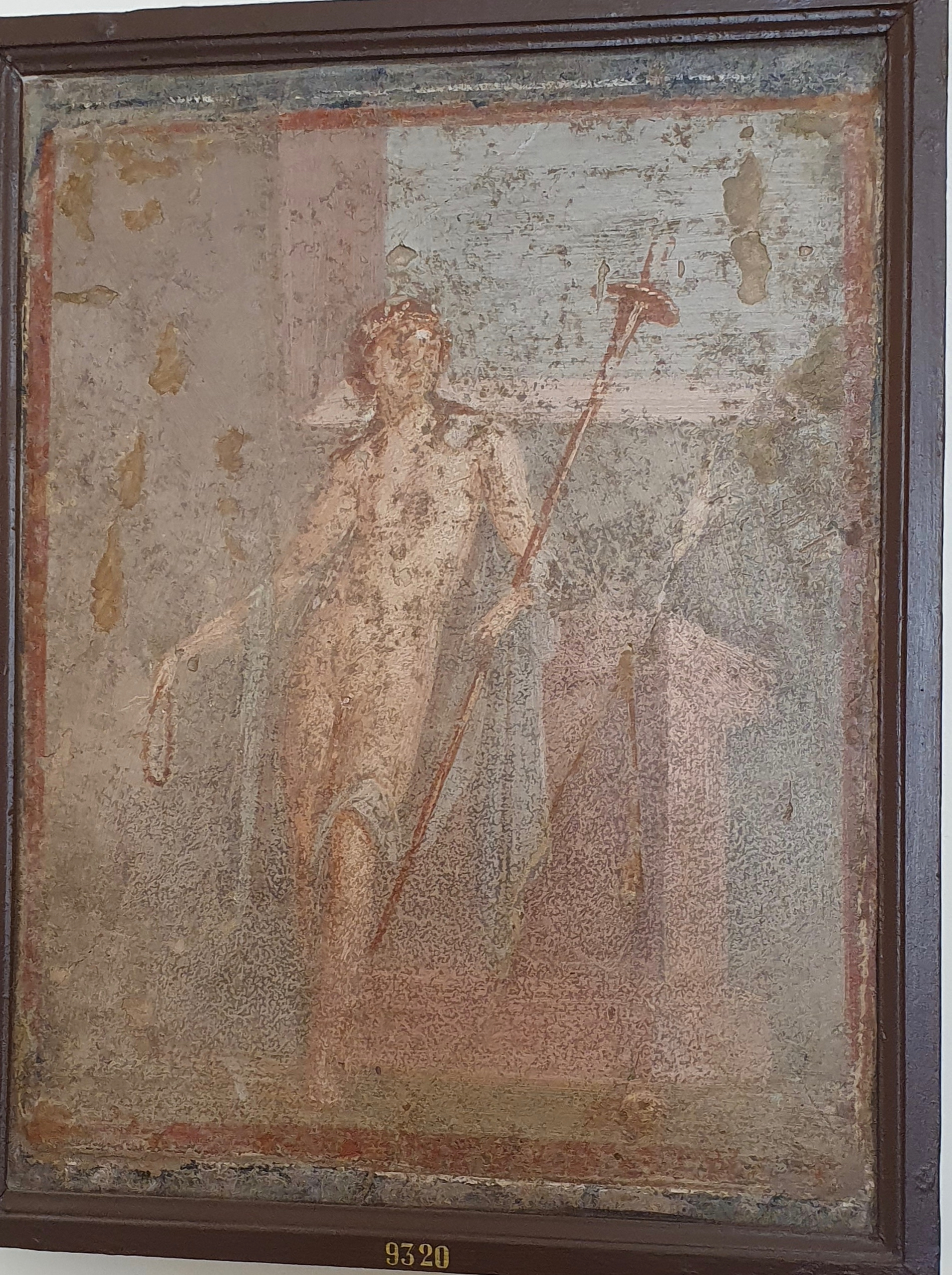
Fresco dated from 62–79 CE depicting Hymenaeus stored in the Museo Archeologico in Naples

Ovid and Catullus both reference the chant "Hymen, Hymenaee" appearing at weddings, with the song featuring prominently in Catullus 61. Statius mentions that the song was performed by doorposts, an assertion supported by Catullus although he leaves it unclear whether it is the doorposts of the entrance to the bedroom or the home. Claudian mentions that Venus anointing Hymen as the "leader to bedrooms" ("ducemque praefecit thalamis"), which is cited by Hersch as evidence that the songs more specifically may have been performed by the entrance to the bedroom. The earliest references to the chant surface in Plautus and Terence, both of whom describe a tibia-player performing the song. In later writings, mentions of the hymenaeus chant accompany doomed or unhappy weddings: Lucretius mentions them occurring at the wedding of Iphigenia and Ovid describes the Calydonian princess Deianira fearing that Iole will be wedded to Hercules under the "shameful bonds of Hymen." Seneca mentions that a choir of Tritons sung the chant at the sacrifice of Polyxena, who was duped into voluntarily arriving at the sacrificial are under the guise of a wedding. However, Seneca also portrays the bride as—in the opinion of Hersch—a "drunk partygoer:" In his Medea, he mentions that Hymen arrives at the wedding with "languid, drunken steps, wreathing [his] brows in a rose garland" and, following the conclusion of the ceremony, permits the spewing of the Fescennine verses and implores the youths to sing songs deprecating their masters. Hersch argues that such descriptions indicate that Hymen was viewed far more as a comical figure than an important and powerful god, noting that—aside from the aforementioned characterizations—one of his most enduring traits in Roman literature is crossdressing: Ovid describes him dressed in a perfumed and saffron Palla, a type of Roman cloak worn by women, which embarrassed him so greatly that his face blushed in a manner Hersch considers evocative of the blushing of the bride. Catullus likewise portrays Hymen in a more feminine manner, describing as dressed like a maiden: he is wearing the bridal flammeum, a marjoram garland, and yellow shoes ("socci lutei"). Despite potentially being treated more as a comic character, Hymen may have served an important literary function: Claudian describes Venus appointing him as "leader to the bedrooms" and Claudian himself states "it is not right to wed nor raise the torches of marriage without him [Hymen]." Hersch doubts that Claudian genuinely believed that Hymen was vital for a legitimate wedding as Rome had already been Christianized; instead, Hersch argues that Hymen had merely become an expected feature in Roman epithalamia by this time. Ovid implies, however, that the chant was spoken at weddings: Ovid pleads with his friend, Maximus, to help convince Augustus him from exile and reminds his friend that he led the hymenaeus at his wedding. Furthermore, Martial provides evidence for a specific type of nuptial blessing involving Hymen, stating in a short epithalamium to his friend "macte esto taedis, o Hymenaee, tuis." ("Blessings be on your torches, Hymenaeus"). Although these sources may suggest that Hymen remained an important aspect of the Roman wedding ceremony, Hersch suggests that it is possible both were merely utilizing Hymen as an expression designed to refer the wedding metonymically, one that may have been rooted in real customs, but not necessarily in customs contemporary to either author's lifetimes.

=== Wedding attendants ===
==== Camillus and the patrimi et matrimi ====
Festus, writing in the past tense, posits that the camillus was a type of freeborn ("ingenuus") boy with both parents alive who assisted the high priest of Jupiter, the Flamen Dialis, in sacrifices; he notes that his contemporaries have postulated that the term was once used as an antiquated synonym for "puer" ("boy"). Servius supports the connection between the camillus and the Flamen Dialis, stating that noble and "unclothed" ("investes") boys and girls were called camili and camilae and respectively that they each served the flamina flaminum and flaminicarum. Festus further connects the camillus to a type of Greek figure called the "κάσμιλον," which held this exact role. Plutarch similarly claims that this individual was a boy with "both his parents living" who served in the Temple of Jupiter and that the term "camillus" derived from a Greek name for Mercury. Macrobius records that another author, Callimachus, was reputed as stating that the term Camillus was an Etruscan term for Mercury, and that this motivated the mythological king Metabus to name his daughter Camilla, as she was a servant of the goddess Diana. According to Varro, "those who have interpreted difficult words" believe that there was once a type of a handmaid called the camilla, who functioned in "more secret" matters. Varro believes that the camillus derives from the camilla; he further explains that the camillus carried some type of box called the cumerum which contained items unknown to most of those who partook in the ceremony. However, Festus, when describing a box labeled as the "cumera," explains that the item, which—according to Festus—was an opened vase, actually held the "materials of the bride" ("nubentis utensilia"). Festus also describes a box referred to as the cumerum: he claims that it was a nuptial item similar to the cumera, adding that the cumera was often crafted from palm or broom wood. Festus describes the children as patrimi and matrimi, which may be the same group of patrimi and matrimi mentioned by Livy, who claims that they were a group of ten freeborn persons and ten virgins with living fathers and mothers respectively who also functioned as assistants in sacrifices. Servius adds onto this definition that the patrimi and matrimi had to have been born from parents wedded through confarreatio. If these groups were indeed identical, then it appears to clash with Festus's apparent differentiation between the patrimi and matrimi, who he claims helped carry the wedding torches, and the camillus, who he says helped carry bridal accoutrements. Festus further distinguishes the camillus from the camelis virginibus, who Festus claims were accustomed to helping the bride about the wed.

==== Pronuba ====
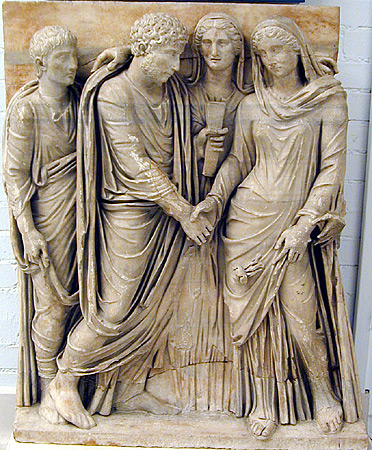
Depiction of the dextrarum iunctio from a Roman sarcophagus.

Although the pronuba was seemingly important to the Roman wedding, little is known about this role beyond that they likely functioned as an assistant for the bride. English scholar Susan Treggiari suggested that the pronuba may have been responsible for joining the bride and the groom's hands during the dextrarum iunctio ("joining of the right hands"), citing a passage from the 1st-century poet Tibullus in which the mother or other officiating woman is responsible for uniting Tibullus with his bride, Delia. However, in the epithalamium for Maria and Honorius, Claudian mentions that joining of the hands was performed by the general Stilicho, according to the "father's office." Another possibility is that the pronuba had a role in sacrificial rites; Treggiari, in support of this claim, cites a passage from Seneca in which Medea declares that she shall carry the "pronubal torch" into the bedroom shortly prior to sacrificing victims upon an altar. The earliest references to the pronubae derive from the Augustan period: One appears in the writings of Varro as recorded by Servius, another—the first reference to any specific individual labeled as the pronuba—derives from the Aeneid. In the Aeneid, during the wedding of Aeneas and Dido in the cave, Juno Pronuba is present alongside Tellus to "give the sign." Later, an enraged Juno declares that the wedding dowry for Lavinia shall be paid by Trojan and Rutulian blood, and the war goddess Bellona shall be the pronuba instead of her. Karen Hersch suggests that the original audience of the Aeneid may have been intended to view the wedding is illegitimate due to the wrath of Juno, as in the Digests it is stated that statements made in anger—such as a request for divorce—are not necessarily legally valid. Whereas in the writings of Ovid the presence of Juno Pronuba (for instance, at the ill-omened wedding of Jason and Hypsipyle) does not necessarily signify that the wedding will be fortunate, her absence is used to highlight the doomed nature of a wedding: She is absent from the wedding of Procne, who eventually murdered her son Itys, and from the wedding of Phyllis, who eventually commits suicide. Phyllis mentions that Tisiphone, an Erinys who punished murderers, served as the pronuba at her wedding instead of Juno. Throughout other Roman writings, the Erinyes appear as the pronubae at particularly cursed weddings: In the Oedipus of Seneca, the ghost of the former Theban King Laius threatens that he shall bring an Erinys as the pronuba and, in The Golden Ass of Apuleius, the character of Charite tells the villainous Thrasillus—who attempted to marry her—that he shall have only the blindness, the pain of his conscience, and the Erinyes as pronubae. Lucan, in his Pharsalia, notes that, during the wedding of Cornelia Metella, an Erinys was the pronuba alongside the ghosts ("umbrae") of slaughtered Crassi—a branch of the Licinia family. Servius, Tertullian, and Festus both provide definitions of the pronuba: All three claim that pronubae were summoned to the wedding and were required to have had only one husband. Isidore of Seville, a medieval author writing after the fall of Rome, also offers a definition of the pronuba, stating that it is a type of paranymph who oversaw the wedding ceremony.

=== Dextrarum iunctio ===
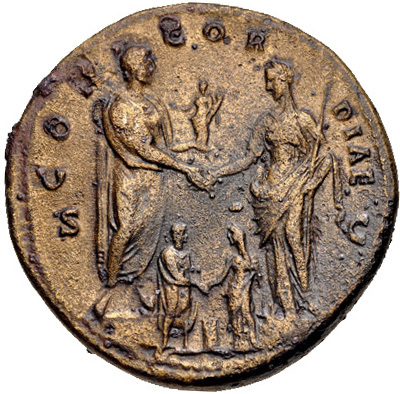
Coin dated to 140–144 CE depicting Antoninus Pius and Faustina the Elder clasping hands with a statuette of Concordia between them. The two small figures are Marcus Aurelius and Faustina the Younger.

Roman art offers numerous depictions of the bride and groom joining hands during the wedding ceremony, a ritual reflected in literature by various accounts of the physical joining of the couple. Although the practice of joining right hands—referred to as the dextrarum iunctio in the Latin language—is prevalent in artistic depictions, few pieces of Roman literature contain explicit descriptions specifically of the clasping of the hands. Classical scholars Karl Sittl and Gordon Williams argued that this ritual was connected to the Roman concept of a manus marriage (manus means "hand" in Latin), in which a marriage "cum manu" ("with a hand") ensured that the bride was transferred from the authority of her father to her husband. Thus, the dextrarum iunctio may have been a physical expression of this transfer of power, the defining moment in which the bride officially left the authority of their father. Evidence for this theory can be found in one of the few explicit mentions of the dextrarum iunctio in Roman writing: in the works of Claudian. Claudian describes Stilicho, who was one of the most prominent figures in Roman politics during this time period, performing the "father's office" and uniting the groom, Emperor Honorius with his bride, Empress Maria, using his "illustrious hand" to demonstrate his support for the marriage. Another potential account of a dextrarum iunctio in Roman literature derives from the Controversiae of Seneca, which recounts a hypothetical scenario involving a contubernium marriage (a type of marriage involving slaves), in which slave is unable to touch the right hand of the bride. However, all of these analyses have been challenged as there is scant reference to the practice in Roman literature, compelling scholars such as Karen Hersch to argue that rather than describing a genuine practice, the idea of clasping of the hands served purely as visual shorthand for the idea of union in marriage. Ellison, in support of the arguments of Hersch, noted that the handclasp appeared in Roman literature and art as a generic symbol for friendship or union: it appeared in numerous scenarios entirely unrelated to weddings or male and female couples, with the author Tacitus describing it as a gesture of friendship.

August Rossbach noticed that in many Roman depictions of the dextrarum iunctio there is a female figure standing between the couple, whom Rossbach interpreted as Juno Pronuba, thus, Rossbach suggested that the pronuba may have been responsible for overseeing the ritual. Alternatively, the individual in the center has been interpreted as Concordia, the Roman goddess of harmony, since the joining of the hands may metonymically represent the harmony of marriage. One piece of writing dated to 400 CE, attributed either to the Christian bishop Peter Chrysologus or the bishop Severian of Gabala, explicitly confirms the usage of Concordia in portraiture, stating "When the images of two persons, kings or brothers, are painted, we often notice that the painter, so as to emphasize the unanimity of the couple, places at the back of them a Concordia in female garb." He later claims that the imagery of Concordia was replaced by the "Peace of the Lord," which Severian claims was used by his lifetime to illustrate this same concept. Another hypothesis posited by the French historian Franz Cumont proposes that the gesture functioned as a symbolic representation of the eternal union of the couple in the afterlife, a proposition which—according to the American historian Anna Marguerite McCann—conforms to a trend of funerary art in the 3rd century.

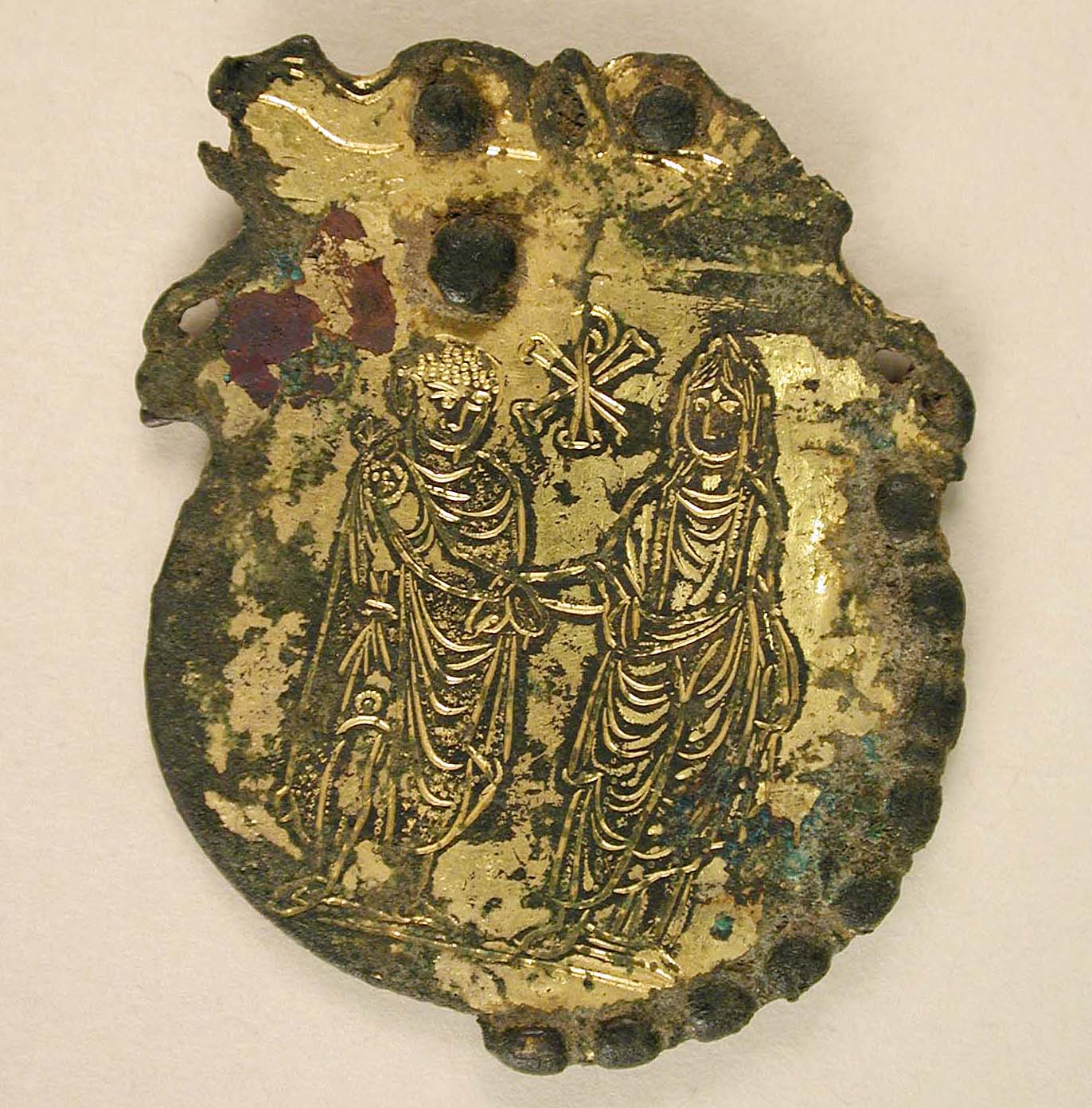
Belt ornament from the 4th-century, depicting a wedding in which the couple is situated beneath the Chi-Rho symbol, a common Christogram.

During the reign of Antoninus Pius (r. 131–168), coins depicting the emperor and his wife Faustina the Elder clasping hands together emerged. These coins frequently feature depictions of the deity Concordia, which Ellison argues likely functioned as propaganda intended to publicize the "harmony of marriages in the imperial familia." This perception of the Imperial couple as exemplifying harmony began to influence Roman wedding customs, with one inscription from Ostia decreeing that all newlywedded couples were mandated to sacrifice at statues of Antoninus and Faustina due to their concordia ("ob insignem eorum concordia"). The historian Cassius Dio records that, in 176 CE, the Senate decreed that silver statues of Marcus Aurelius and Faustina the Younger were to be erected at the Temple of Venus and Roma and all newlyweds were required to perform sacrifices. According to the historian Peter Brown, such depictions caused the perceived concordia of a marriage to become viewed as a representation of broader civic order. German historian Ernst Kantorowicz argued that the notion of concordia in the Roman marriage was a relatively late development in Roman history, noting that—during the rape of the Sabine women—the grooms did not clasp hands with the bride, but instead grabbed her by the wrist. However, Kantorowicz suggests that, partially due to influence from the Stoic concept of homonoia, the idea of social and political unity, the wedding ceremony was recontextualized as a conduit for demonstrating concordia.

Other deities have served as the pronubus: One coin dated to around 270–275 CE depicts Emperor Aurelian (r. 214–275) and his wife Ulpia Severina clasping hands underneath a depiction of the sun god Sol Invictus, a god whose Aurelian helped revitalize. Another piece of artwork, discovered on a gold glass vessel dated to around 360–400 CE depicts Hercules standing between a couple and a third art piece also dated to the 4th-century depicts Cupid situated between a couple. Ellison argues that the variety of deities capable of functioning as the pronubus may have reflected the variety of different patron deities each individual Roman may have preferred; Romans may have altered the chosen deity to function as pronubus depending upon the specific boons they hoped to acquire through currying favor with a god.

Ellison argues that in later, Christian art, the figure of the pronuba—the figure situated between the bride and groom—was replaced by imagery of Jesus Christ. He cites various pieces of Christian artworks to illustrate this point, including a partially preserved example stored in the Villa Albani, which depicts Christ intervening between the dextrarum iunctio of a Christian couple. Another example dated to around 390 CE, housed in the Cattedrale di San Catervo, portrays two married Christians named Flavius Julius Catervius and Septimia Severina; they are located underneath a hand holding jeweled wreath, which has been interpreted as either God bestowing a reward upon the couple, although the scholar Joseph Wilpert argues that it may have represented the hand of Jesus due to the presence of the Chi-Rho symbol located on the sides of portrait and Theodor Klauser proposed that it may have been a wedding wreath. Above the portrait lies an inscription that states the "all-powerful God bound them in sweet matrimony" ("Quos vinxit matrimonio dulci omnipotens Dominus"). Other pieces of Christian artwork refrained from depicting the clasping of the hands but continued to depict the bride and groom being crowned by Christ. For instance, a piece dated to around 360–390 CE from the British Museum portrays Christ holding two wreaths above a married couple. The artwork contains text reading "Sweet soul, may you live" ("Dulcis anima vivas"). Another common artistic motif, frequently found on rings dated to the 4th–5th centuries, involves the substitution of the image of Christ with a Christogram, or a symbol serving as shorthand for the name of Christ.

=== Wedding couch and banquet ===
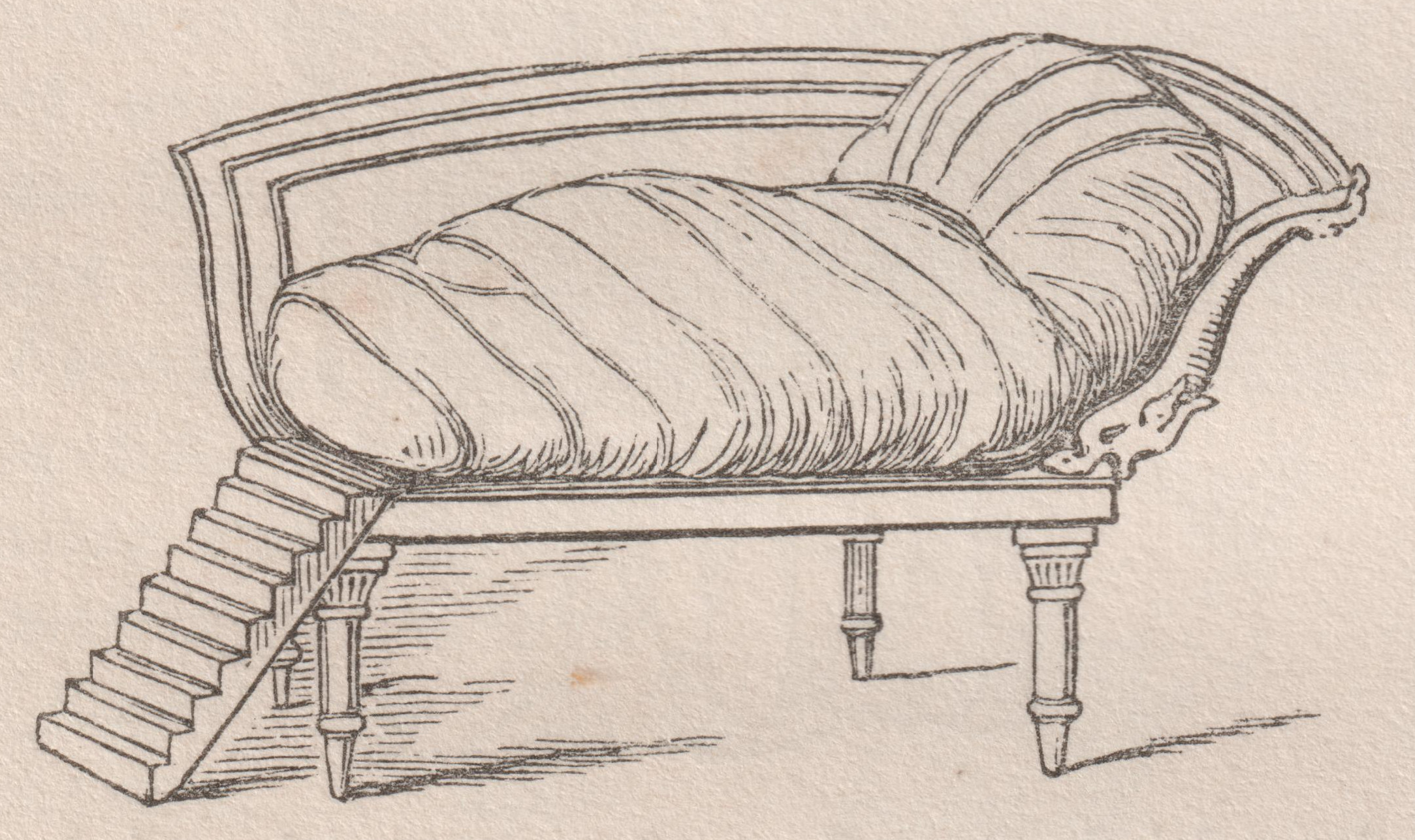
Artist's impression of the lectus genialis, based upon Lucan's descriptions in the Pharsalia.

The wedding couch, the lectus genialis ("genial couch"), was often described as lavishly ornamented: Juvenal mentions Messalina bringing a Tyrian genialis to her wedding and Claudian mentions that the wedding couch for Honorius and Maria was of the expensive Tyrian purple dye and would soon be splotched with blood following sexual intercourse. In the Attic Nights of the 2nd-century Roman author Aulus Gellius, it is said that legislation was passed restricting the size of wedding expenses: First, the Lex Fannia ("Fannian Law") imposed a limit of 200 asses and then the Lex Julia ("Julian Law"), passed by Emperor Augustus (r. 27 BCE – 14 CE), instituted a maximum cost of 1,000 sesterces for Roman wedding feasts. Treggiari suggests that the bride's family may have been largely responsible for covering wedding costs, citing a passage from Plautus in which a character remarks "What, couldn't that old fellow [Euclio, father of the bride Phaedria] buy stuff out of his own pocket for his daughter's wedding?" Cicero, in his legal argument Pro Cluentio ("In favor of Cluentius"), mentions that an individual named Oppianicus organized a wedding feast and invited a sizeable quantity of guests according to the "custom of Larinum."

Festus explains that the term for the couch derives from the genii—spirits for whom Festus claims the lectus was decorated or laid out. Arnobius, writing centuries later, provides a similar claim, mentioning that the Romans pagans in prior ages used to spread a toga across the couches call upon genii of matrimony. In contrast, Varro postulates that the couch was laid out in honor of the deities Pilumnus and Picumnus, two deities associated with children. Further connections to childbirth appear in the play Medea by Seneca, in which the titular character summons Lucina—a Roman goddess of childbirth—who is described in the text as being "of the marriage bed" ("genialis tori"). The connection between the genii and the couch has led the author J. P. V. D. Balsdon to argue that the bed was symbolically intended for the genii, not the actual bride and groom. Treggiari disputes this assertion, denouncing it as "unsubstantiated by clear evidence;" evidence which includes a section from Catullus, in which the author notes a Tyrian couch occupied by the groom and awaiting the bride. The 19th-century Italian classicist Giorgio Pasquali interpreted this as referring to the lectus genialis, although the scholar C.J. Fordyce contradicts this analysis: arguing that the groom could also be read as waiting in an entirely separate couch unrelated to the lectus genialis.

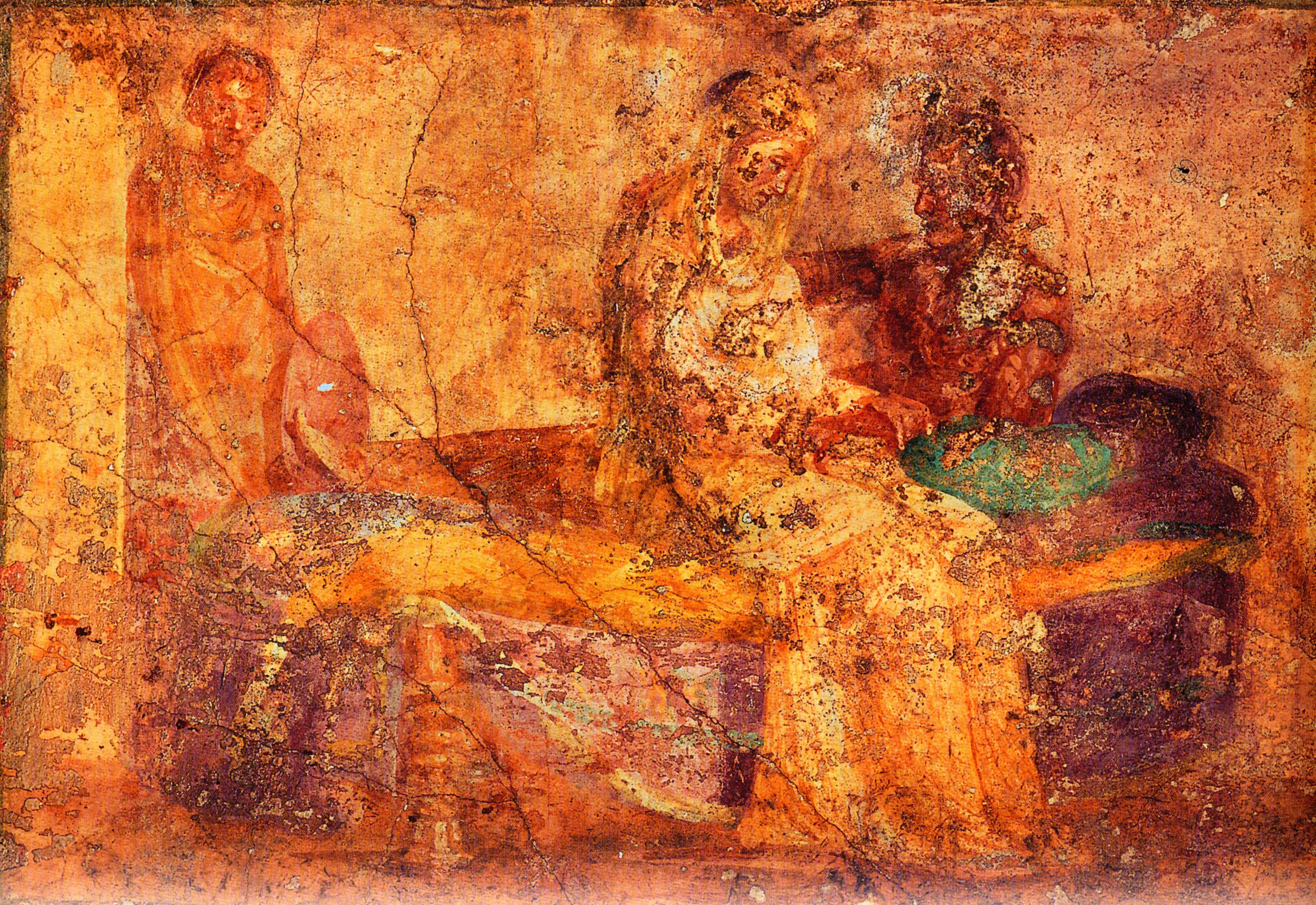
A bride and groom lie in bed together while a servant looks onwards (wall painting, Casa della Farnesina, ca. 19 BCE)

Servius provides another etymology: he explains that the couch earned the name genialis from the generation of children, a theory also expressed by Isidore of Seville. Servius further notes that the bed was spread out for the bride, a claim supported by other authors: Catullus, in his description of the wedding between the king Peleus and the Nereid Thetis, mentions that the wedding bed, which was crafted from Indian tusks and covered with purple embellished with a red tint, was being "set for the goddess." Cicero describes a woman named Cluentia who, upon remarrying, reuses the same marriage bed that was "made ready for her daughter" and then once more has it adorned and "made ready for her." In the Epistulae of Horace, the author includes an instance in which a character inquires whether a lectus genialis was located within the aula (palace, forecourt of a house), an anecdote cited by Treggiari as evidence that the wedding couch may have been situated within the atrium, which was itself the main entrance to a Roman house. It is also possible that the couch may have been positioned opposite of the door, as in the works of Aulus Gellius the wedding couch is referred to as "lectus adversus" ("adverse couch"). However, Treggiari concedes that this tradition, if it was practiced, could have been performed by those wealthy enough to afford such homes with atria. Treggiari further argues that numerous passages from Roman literature appear to contradict this notion, most definitively—according to Treggiari—a passage from Cicero in which he describes the "threshold of the bedroom" ("limen cubliculi") and the predecessor to consummating the marriage on the lectus genialis.

Tacitus—while describing the wedding of Nero and the freedman Pythagoras—implies that the emperor copulated with his partner in the wedding couch; he mentions that, after reclining amongst their guests, they spent their night acting in a manner permitted by the "conjugal license," presumably referring to sex. Another segment from Apuleius conveys a similar implication: a woman is condemned to be publicly humiliated by having sex with the protagonist Lucius, who has been transformed into a donkey. The punishment was set to imitate a wedding ceremony, including a nuptial couch stuffed with feathers, covered by a bedspread of flowers, and adorned with tortoiseshells. However, the reliability of these depictions is questionable: these ceremonies were intentionally aberrant, with Treggiari and Hersch both noting that they were intended to be viewed as outrageous and shocking. Furthermore, Augustine outright denies that the first act of intercourse between the bride and the groom was public, stating that when the wedding couple retire to the nuptial bed the wedding attendants withdraw from the ceremony. Treggiari argues that the bride and groom may have been left alone on the wedding couch, citing a passage from Catullus in which the "virgins" are asked to depart after the bride joins the groom in bed.

When the bride and groom were about to engage in sex, they may have engaged in a phatic conversation in which the groom attempted to provide consolation to the bride and, in return, the bride demonstrated increased affection towards her husband. Treggiari, in support of this view, cites an example from Plautus in which the groom, Olympio, attempts to comfort his bride by placing her in bed, supporting her ("fulcio"), and then soothing her. Quintilian deprecates an individual who had chosen to wed an older woman, noting in his declamation that, once the wedding couple has entered the bedroom chamber, "how is she to talk sweet, how address [the groom]?" Treggiari interprets this passage from Quintilian as evidence that there may have been an expectation for the bride to demonstrate themselves as growing more affectionate of the groom. Claudian describes the bedroom scene in the wedding of Honorius and Maria as a violent affair, implying that the bride may violently resist Honorius with fingernails; the author compares her to a rose guarded by thorns or honey protected by bees. Wasdin suggests that this nuptial violence may derive from a belief that violent retaliation heightened the pleasure to be derived from sex, citing a passage from Claudian in which he expostulates that "sweeter is the kiss snatched through tears." Wasdin further notes another passage from Catullus in which he advises the bride "non aequom est pugnare" ("it is not proper to resist"); Wasdin argues that this indicates that it was somewhat expected for the bride to retaliate, thus necessitating such an instruction.

According to the account of Tacitus, the sexual intercourse occurred directly after the wedding feast: Tacitus states that they reclined to the wedding couch after reclining upon a separate couch for the banquet. The classicist Matthew Roller argued that, in Roman literature, there is a common theme of women possessing a sexual attachment to the individual they are reclining with at a dining table; he suggests that, due to this notion, the act of reclining with an individual at a banquet publicly demonstrated a sexual relation with that person. Evidence that the Roman bride was obligated to recline with her husband derives from the Roman History of Cassius Dio: The author records that Livia, the ex-wife of Tiberius Claudius Nero, was approached by a slave during the banquet for her wedding to Caesar who was confused as to why she was reclining with the emperor as opposed to Nero, whom the slave still believed was her husband. Cyprian, a 3rd-century Christian bishop, admonishes all virgins who attended wedding banquets, as they may partake in the "unchaste conversation" and the "disgraceful words" that excite lust and compel the bride "to the endurance of shame ("patiendum stupri")" and the groom "to dare lewdness." Cyprian remarks that such licentiousness may "dimmish the virtues" of a virgin by inducing immodesty, which by extension defiles them in "eyes, in ears, [and] in tongue" even if they "remain a virgin in body and mind." In the play Casina by Plautus, the mother of the bride performs the preparations for the wedding feast; however, in Aulularia, another Plautine play, the feast is organized at the behest of the father. This play provides further details about the wedding feast: a female tibia-player and cooks to prepare dishes such as fish, bread, roosters, lambs, and wine. Later in the same play, the protagonist Euclio remarks on the ludicrousness of the idea of cancelling the wedding after the wedding feast and other nuptial accoutrements were prepared. Juvenal mocks grooms who expend much effort or resources on extravagant meals and cakes called mustacea for women who do not reciprocate their love, declaring that the wedding indulgences were merely a waste of time in such a scenario.

== Depictions in art and literature ==
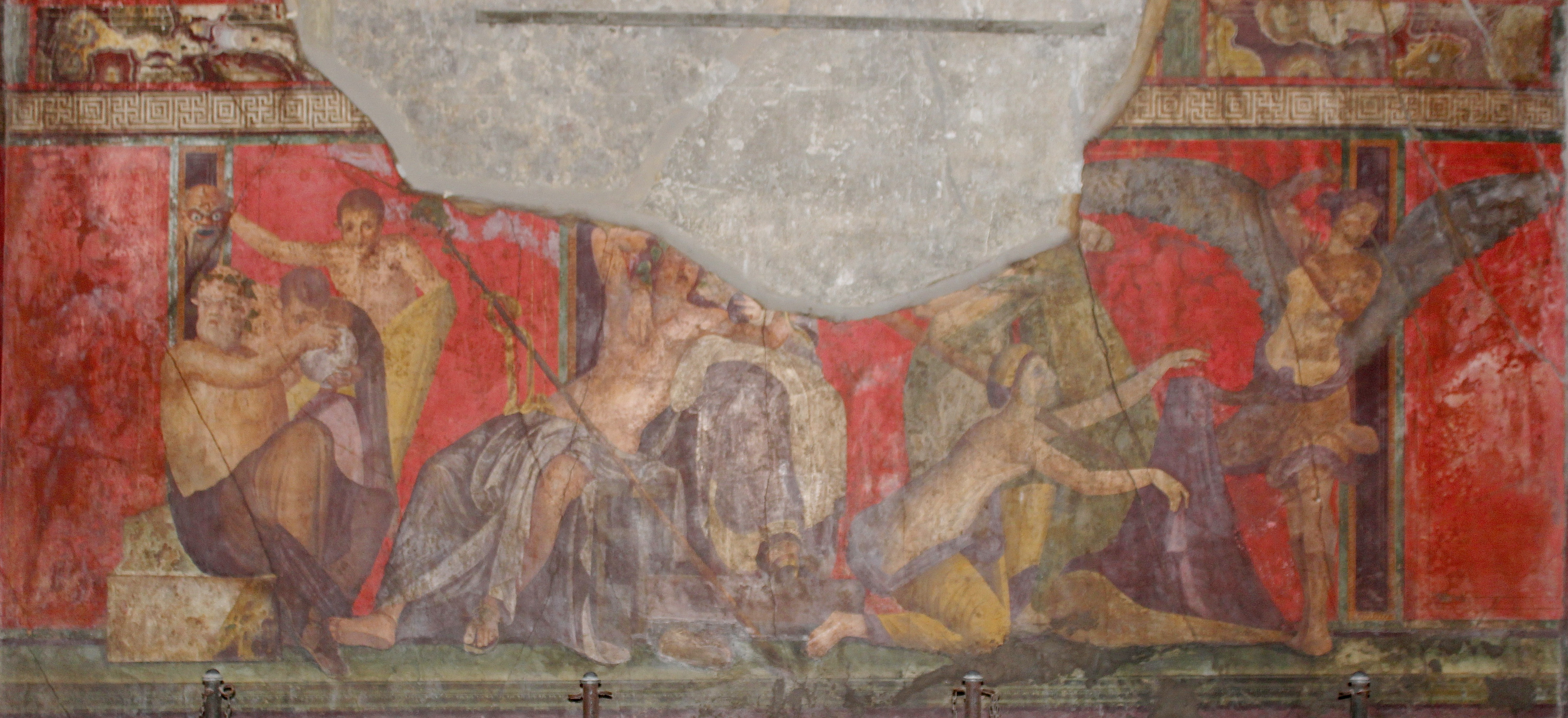
Fresco from the Villa of the Mysteries depicting a wedding scene. Alternatively, it may depict a woman being inducted into the Cult of Dionysus, a beauty pageant honoring Dionysus, or some combination of these.

Literary evidence for ancient Roman weddings is heavily biased towards the weddings of the upper classes, with depictions of the weddings of the poor or rural folk excluded from the literary record. Furthermore, the scholar Susan Treggiari notes that descriptions of weddings may be romanticized descriptions that portray a cultural ideal of a wedding, rather than accurately reflecting the minutiae of how the majority of real individuals participated in the ritual. Many individuals may have only practiced a select few of each individual Roman wedding custom; Treggiari notes that, just as modern families may not perform every distinct ritual associated with contemporary traditions, ancient Roman families likely refrained from practicing each custom delineated by Roman authors. Treggiari continues, adding that it also possible that—in some circumstances—life imitated art just as art imitates life: individuals may have been inspired by prominent literary examples and modeled their own wedding ceremonies after artistic portrayals. Karen Hersch suggests that, although a great multitude of Roman wedding customs were described as ancient, they may have been altered or perhaps fabricated to conform to the changing sociopolitical needs of Roman society.

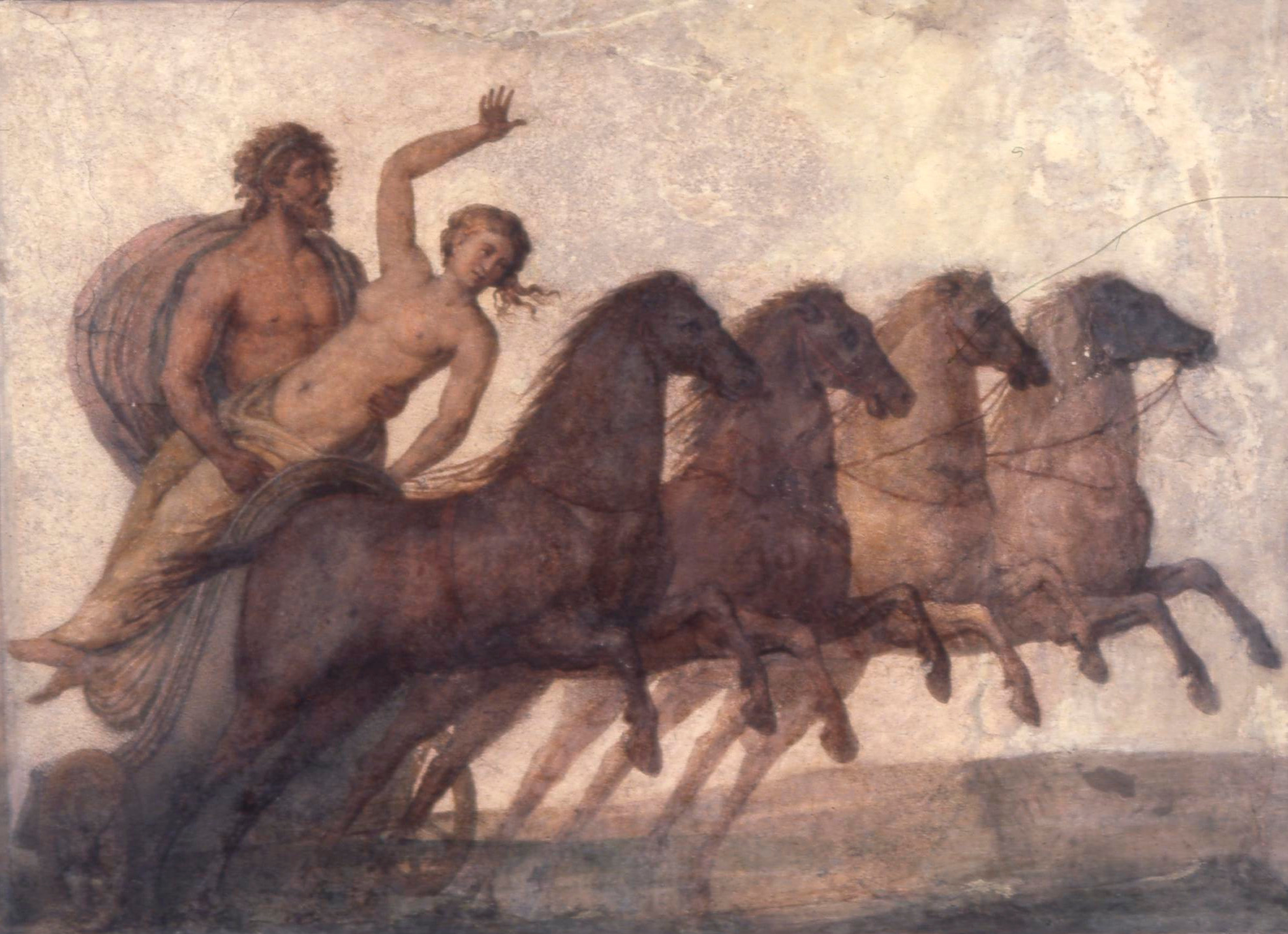
Roman painting depicting the rape of Proserpina. The wedding between Pluto and Proserpina is considered by Hersch to be the epitome of the "wedding to death."

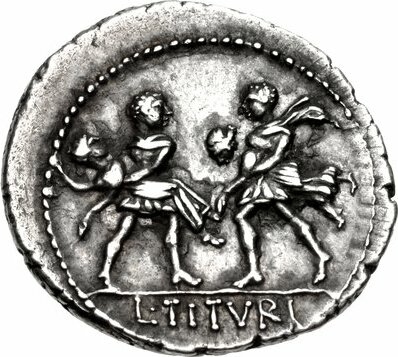
Scene from Republican denarius dated to 89 BCE, depicts the rape of the Sabine women

The Roman literary tradition regarding depictions of wedding was possibly influenced by Greek customs: Catullus in particular makes frequent use of similes and comparisons in his descriptions of weddings, an artistic style which the classicist Denis Feeney proposes may have derived from similar techniques employed in earlier Greek poetry such as those found in Sapphic works. In one surviving fragment of Sapphic poetry, the author compares a bride losing their virginity to a hyacinth being crushed by shepherds; a similar passage appears in Catullus in which he compares the bride to a hyacinth standing in a rich man's garden. Roman writers may also have imitated other Roman writers: the scholar Zoja Pavlovskis argues that authors such as Claudian drew significant inspiration from Statius, citing similarities such as the prevalence of the deity Venus in both poems. They both depict Venus reclining in a bedroom before having her attention drawn to the ceremony, both emphasize the luxury of the dwelling of Venus, both mention a horde of "pharetrati" ("quivered," wearing a "quiver;" interpreted by Pavlovskis as "Cupids") following Venus, both depict Venus officiating the wedding ceremony. Scholar of Latin poetry Roberto Chiappiniello argues that the Christian epithalamium of Paulinus of Nola intentionally referenced and subverted traditional Pagan customs, such as mentioning that the lovers were unified under the "yoke of Christ," which—according to Chiappiniello—is reminiscent of the references to the bride and groom being united under the yoke of Venus found in pagan literature.

Roman and Greek literary depictions of weddings feature themes of the "wedding to death," defined by the historian Rush Rehm as the "conflation of wedding and funeral rites." Panoussi argues that the subversion of the wedding rituals present in this literary motif can convey a sense of broader perversion in society, as—according to Panoussi—the wedding, when practiced according to custom, was often perceived as a microcosm of Roman family structure and society. Panoussi argues that such symbolism is present in the Pharsalia of Lucan, in which he describes Marcia, the wife of Cato the Younger, himself a commander in Caesar's civil war, arriving at her wedding dressed in funeral garb. Marcia—according to Panoussi—is depicted as simultaneously embodying and rejecting traditional Roman values: Although Marcia is infertile, negating the primary purpose of a Roman wedding—reproduction, Panoussi believes she partially fulfills the role of Roman wife as she pleads with Cicero to marry her so that she may be buried with him and be permanently remembered as Cato's wife. Panoussi notes that Marcia assumes a more active role in both the relationship and the text itself; she initiates the wedding proposal, an act unconventional for Roman women, and expresses a desire to uphold her own perceived virtue as a Roman matron. According to Panoussi, the contrast between the actions of Marcia and the impropriety of the wedding rituals establishes her as a guardian of Roman customs, especially—in the opinion of Panoussi— when contextualized by the civil war. However, the text later describes Marcia as a willing and desirous participant in the violence of the civil war, which culminated in her and Cato's death. Panoussi suggests that the dissolution of the wedding foreshadowed the tragic fate of Marcia and Cato, and also highlighting the breakdown in Roman society that the text implies occurred in tandem with the civil war.

Seneca the Younger makes extensive use of the motif of the "wedding to death," with the concept featuring in his play: the Troades. In the play, the Trojan princess Polyxena is told that she is set to wed Pyrrhus, however the arrangement is a ruse designed to lure her into being sacrifice so the Greeks could be permitted to sail home. Panoussi argues that nature of this wedding, involving deceit and murder, highlights that morally decadent nature of the Greek figures in the play and the misfortune regarding the destruction of Troy. Furthermore, this play contains a second example of a doomed wedding in the form of the wedding of Helen of Troy to Paris, the wedding which precipitated the Trojan War. Within the play, the character of Andromache summarizes the unfortunate nature of both weddings by stating "You plague, destruction, pest of both peoples, do you see these tombs of leaders and the bare bones of so many lying all over the plain unburied? These your wedding has scattered."

Wasdin argues for the existence of another theme in Roman elegiac love poetry: militia amoris ("war of love"). Throughout Greek and Roman poetry, there is a tendency to conflate warfare and violence with love and romance. The bride can be treated like a captured city or a part of the "spoils of war." Catullus likens the cruelty of the domum deductio to that of the looting of a city: in one of his poems, characters lament that Hesperus is the cruelest deity for his role in the ritual, which they view as more malicious than warfare, asking "What shall the foeman deal more cruel to city be captured?" Symbolism of warfare permeated the wedding ceremony: the bride may have had their hair parted via a spear called the hasta caelibaris and many of the wedding rituals, such as the domum deductio or the cry Talassio, were thought to have originated in the war between the Sabines and the Romans.
