= Metabus (disambiguation) =

Metabus is a mythical king of the Volsci.

Metabus may also refer to:

- Metabus (spider) is a spider genus
- Metapontum, in Italy
- Metabus(son of Sisyphus), the city of Metapontum in Italy named after him
