= Harpalyce (mythology) =

Several characters in Greek mythology

In Greek mythology, Harpalyce (Ancient Greek: Ἁρπαλύκη, romanized: Harpalúkē) is a name attributed to several women.

- Harpalyce, daughter of King Clymenus of Arcadia, son of either Schoeneus (first version) or of Teleus of Argos (second version). Clymenus was overcome with passion for his daughter, raped her and then she killed the child and fed it to Clymenus, who then killed her. In another version, she killed her brother and was transformed into a bird.
- Harpalyce, the daughter of Harpalykos, king in Thrace. Her father taught her to be a warrior and heir to his kingdom, but after his death she dedicated her life to robbing livestock before being killed by the animals' owners.
- Harpalyce, probably the same as above, who freed quickly her aged father after he was surrounded by a multitude.
- Harpalyce, a maiden that was in love with one Iphiclus but never had her feelings answered and eventually died of grief. To commemorate her, a song contest among maidens was established and named "Harpalyce".
- Harpalyce, a daughter of the north wind god Boreas according to a medieval source.
