= Venus and Mars (Botticelli) =

Painting by Sandro Botticelli

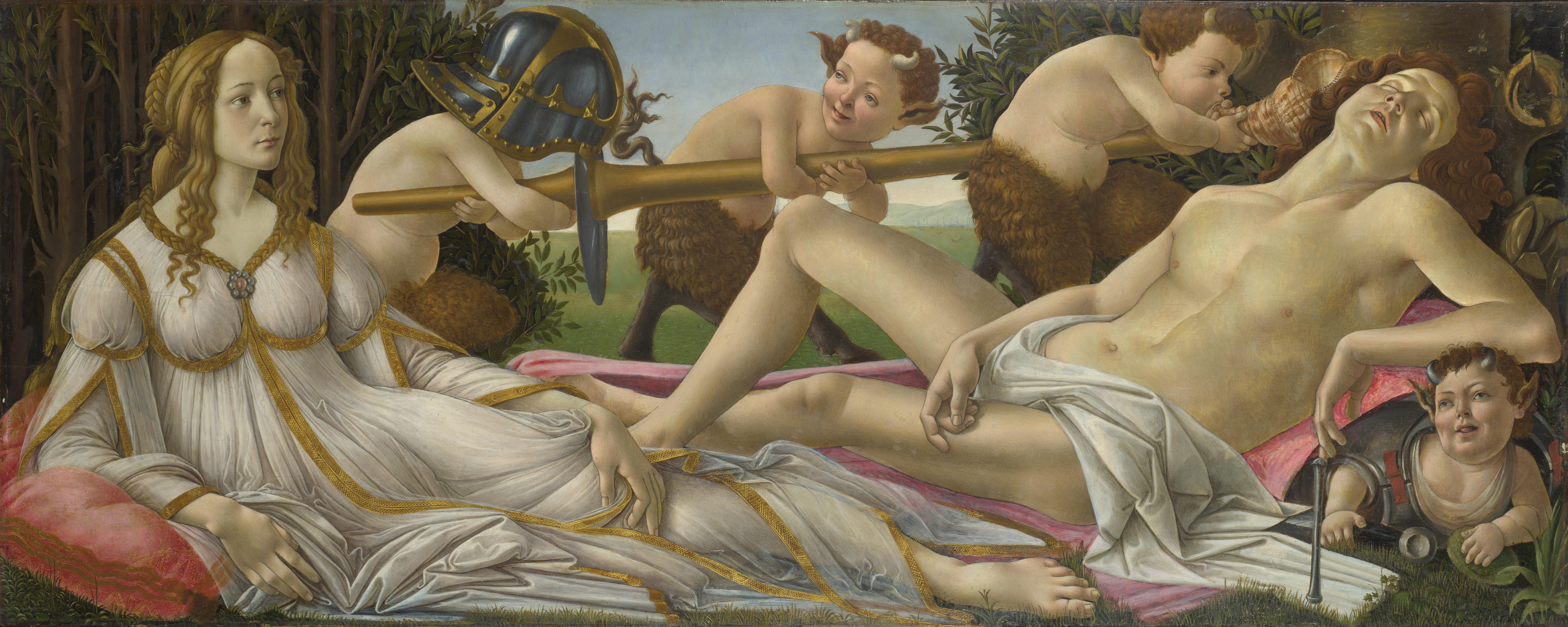
Venus and Mars, c 1485. Tempera and oil on poplar panel, 69 cm x 173 cm. National Gallery, London

Venus and Mars (or Mars and Venus) is a panel painting of about 1485 by the Italian Renaissance painter Sandro Botticelli. It shows the Roman gods Venus, goddess of love, and Mars, god of war, in an allegory of beauty and valour. The youthful and voluptuous couple recline in a forest setting, surrounded by playful baby satyrs.

The painting was probably intended to commemorate a wedding, set into panelling or a piece of furniture to adorn the bedroom of the bride and groom, possibly as part of a set of works. This is suggested by the wide format and the close view of the figures. It is widely seen as representation of an ideal view of sensuous love. It seems likely that Botticelli worked out the concept for the painting, with its learned allusions, with an advisor such as Poliziano, the Medici house poet and Renaissance Humanist scholar.

The exact date of Venus and Mars is not known, but the National Gallery dated the painting to c. 1485 in 2017. Scholar Ronald Lightbown dates it to "probably around 1483", while art historians Leopold and Helen Ettlinger date the painting to "the latter half of the 1480s". All dates depend on analysis of the style, as the painting has not been convincingly tied to a specific date or event, such as a wedding. It likely comes a few years after the Primavera and Pallas and the Centaur (both about 1482) and around the time of The Birth of Venus (c. 1486). It is the only one of these paintings not in the Uffizi in Florence; it has been in the National Gallery in London since 1874.

Between 10 May and 10 September 2024, in celebration of the 200th anniversary of the National Gallery, the painting was shown at the Fitzwilliam Museum in Cambridge.

== Description ==
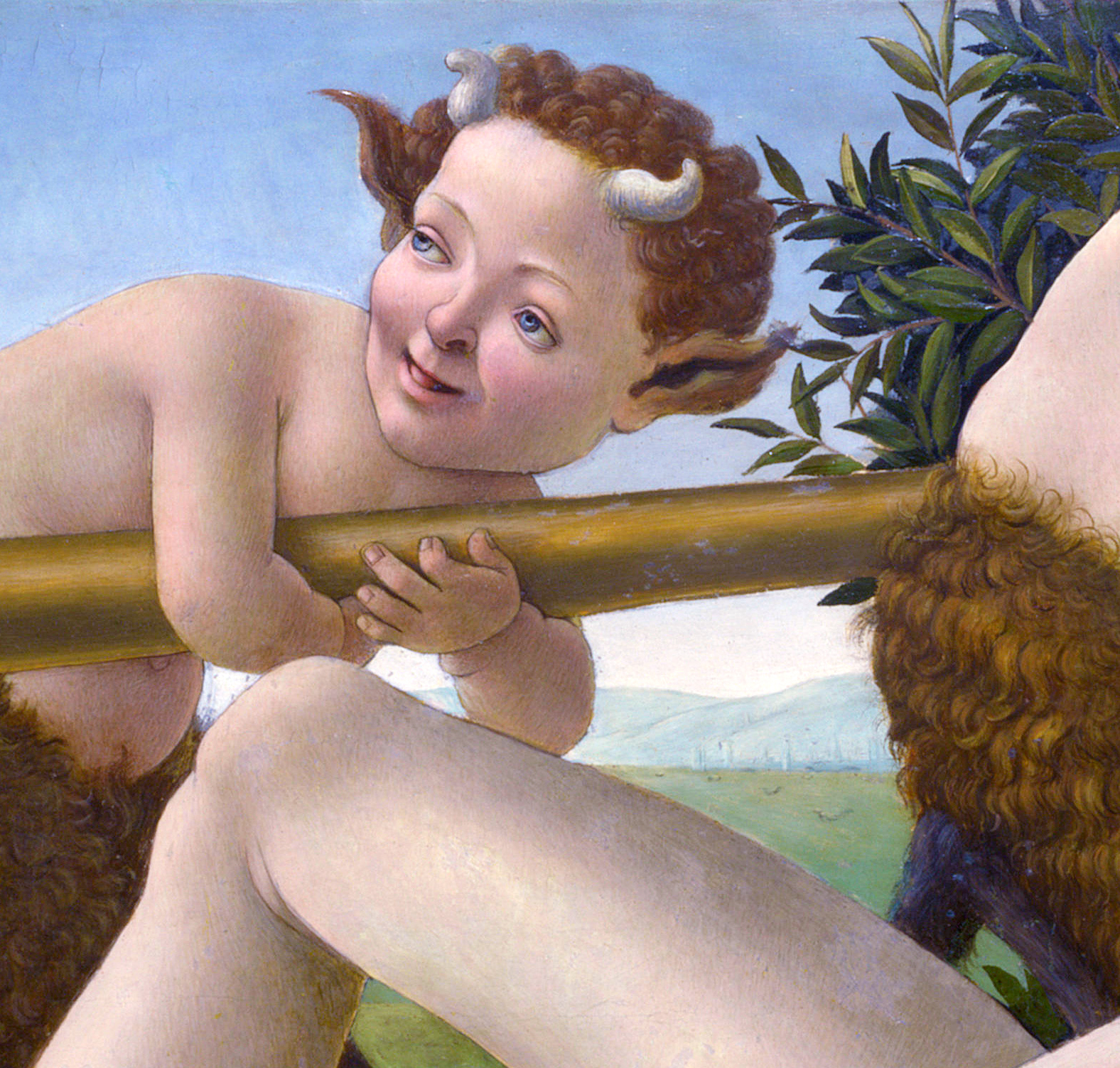
Infant satyr and landscape

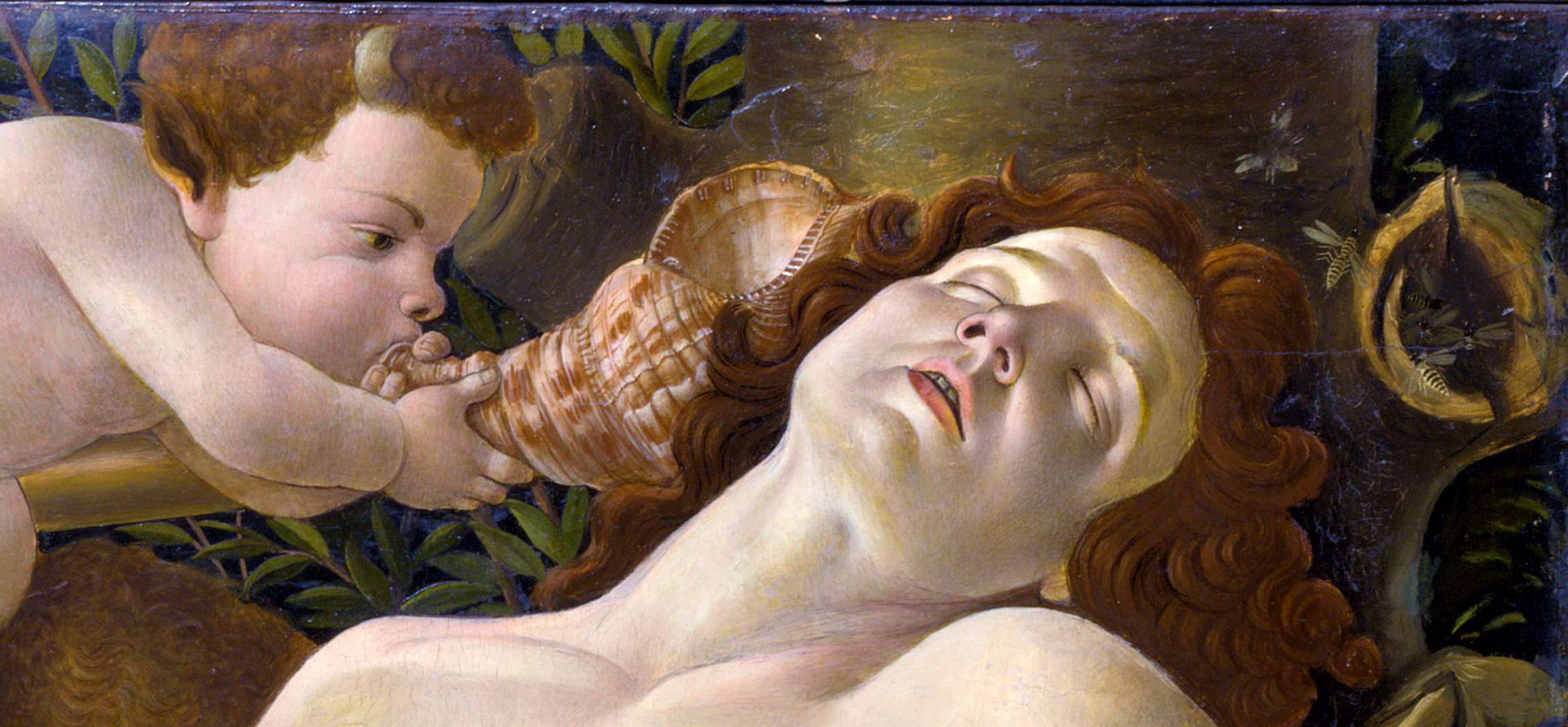
Mars, with the wasp's nest on the right

Venus watches Mars sleep while two infant satyrs play, carrying his helmet (a sallet) and lance as another rests inside his breastplate under his arm. A fourth blows a small conch shell in his ear in an effort, so far unsuccessful, to wake him. The clear implication is that the couple have been making love; the male habit of falling asleep after sex was a regular subject for ribald jokes in the context of weddings in Renaissance Italy. The lance and conch can be read as sexual symbols.

The scene is set in a grove of myrtle, traditionally associated with Venus and marriage, or possibly laurel, associated with Lorenzo de' Medici (il Magnifico), or perhaps both plants. There is a limited view of the meadow beyond, leading to a distant walled city.

In the foreground, a swarm of wasps hovers around Mars' head, possibly as a symbol that love is often accompanied by pain. Another explanation, first suggested by Ernst Gombrich, is that the wasps represent the Vespucci family that may have commissioned the painting. They had been neighbours of Botticelli since his childhood, and had commissioned his Saint Augustine in His Study for the Ognissanti church in 1480, probably in addition to other commissions. Their coat of arms included wasps, as their name means "little wasps" in Italian, and the wasps' nest, in a hollow in the tree in the top right corner, is exactly in the place in the panel where the coat of arms of a patron was often painted.

The painting is thought originally to have been set into panelling as a spalliera, or part of furniture such as a bed, the back of a lettuccio, a wooden sofa, or a similar piece.

Ronald Lightbown describes Mars as "Botticelli's most perfect male nude", though there are not really a large number of these; he was less interested in perfecting the anatomy of his figures than many of his Florentine contemporaries, but seems to have paid special attention to it here. The Venus here, unlike in the artist's Birth of Venus, is fully clothed, as she is in marital mode. This despite Venus being the wife of Vulcan, making the relationship adulterous by normal human standards. In Greek Neoplatonism, Harmony was the daughter of their union. Other late classical sources regarded Cupid as a child of the union.

== Interpretation ==
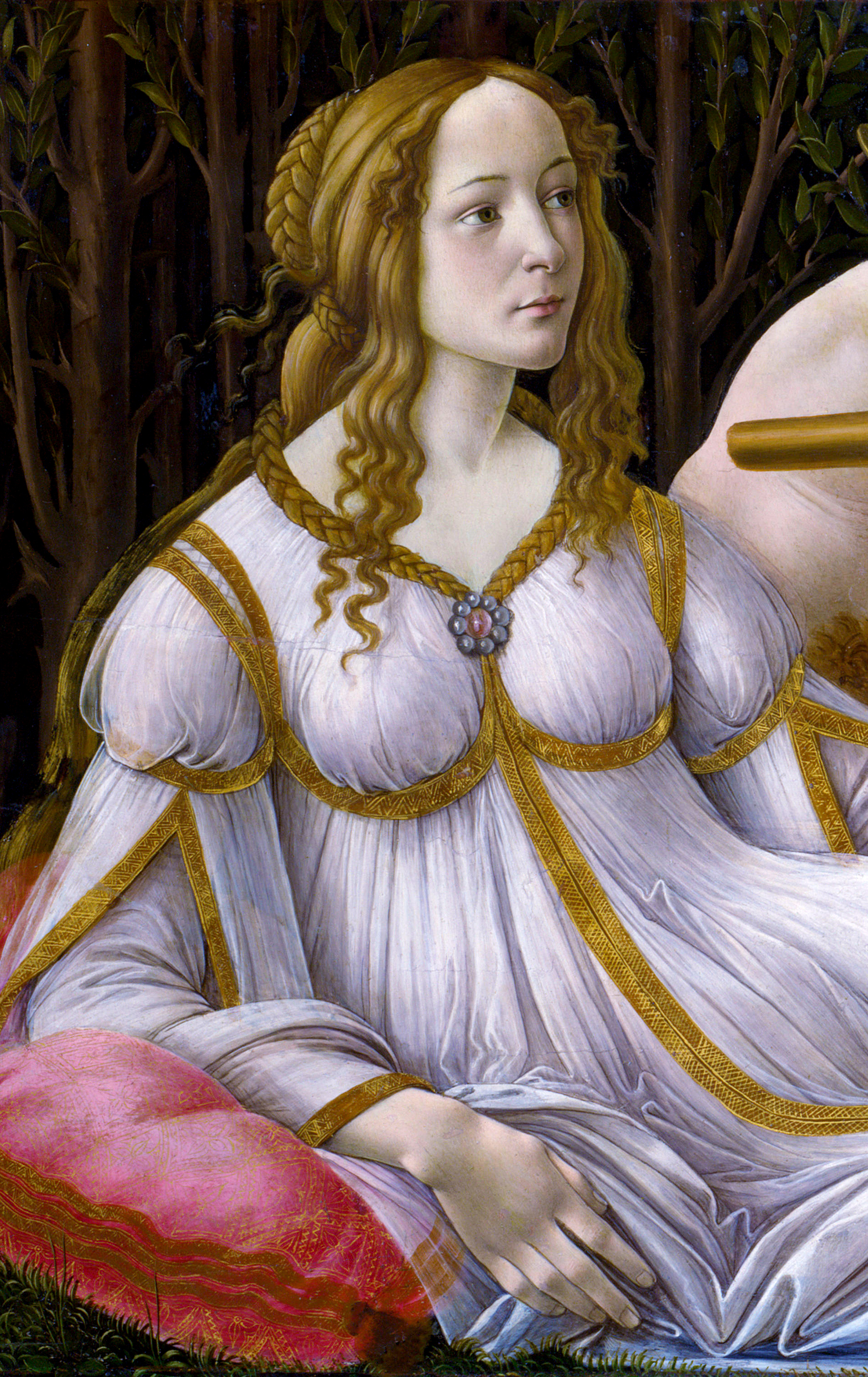
Venus

The usual view of scholars is that the painting was commissioned to celebrate a marriage, and is a relatively uncomplicated representation of sensual pleasure, with an added meaning of love conquering or outlasting war. This was a commonplace in Renaissance thinking, which might be elaborated in terms of Renaissance Neoplatonism. As with the other mythologies, Ernst Gombrich and Edgar Wind were the first to analyse the painting in these terms. The couple's relationship could also be considered in terms of astrology, in which Mars is, according to Marsilio Ficino, "outstanding in strength among the planets, because he makes men stronger, but Venus masters him ...she seems to master Mars, but Mars never masters Venus".

The Victorian critic John Addington Symonds, without disagreeing with that interpretation, thought the newly fashionable Botticelli overrated and "harboured an irrational dislike for the picture", writing that "The face and attitude of that unseductive Venus... opposite her snoring lover, seems to symbolize the indignities which women have to endure from insolent and sottish boys with only youth to recommend them."

One dissenting interpretation is from Charles Dempsey, who finds a more sinister meaning in the picture, with the little satyrs as incubi who torment sleepers, provoking "sexual terrors in the dreams of those bound in a state of sensual error and confusion." He concludes that "The idea of love here invested in Venus seems to be revealed, not in a positive celebration of the spirit animating natural life shown in the Primavera and Birth of Venus but as an empty sensual fantasy that disarms and torments the slumbering spirit of a once virile martial valour.

The work is agreed by all to draw on the description by Lucian, a poet in Greek of the 2nd-century AD, of a famous painting, now lost, by Echion of the wedding ceremony of Alexander the Great and Roxana. The ancient painting probably adapted iconography associated with Venus and Mars to the historical Alexander and his bride. Lucian's ekphrasis or description mentions amoretti or putti playing with Alexander's armour during the ceremony, two carrying his lance and one who has crawled inside his breastplate.

This is taken both as evidence of Botticelli's collaboration with Humanist advisors with the full classical education that he lacked, and his keenness to recreate the lost wonders of ancient painting, a theme in the interpretation of several of his secular works, most clearly in the Calumny of Apelles, which also uses Lucian. A Roman sarcophagus in the Vatican is carved with a similar Mars and Venus reclining, accompanied by putti.

The position of the main figures reflects the description of them by Lucretius in de rerum natura ("The Nature of Things"): "though Mars the War Lord rules war’s savage works, yet often he throws himself into your arms, faint with love’s deathless wound, and there, with arching neck bent back, looks up and sighs, and feeds a lustful eye on you and, pillowed, dangles his life’s breath from your lips. Then, as he falls back on your sacred body, Lady, lean over and let sweet utterance pour from your holy lips—a plea of peace for Rome."

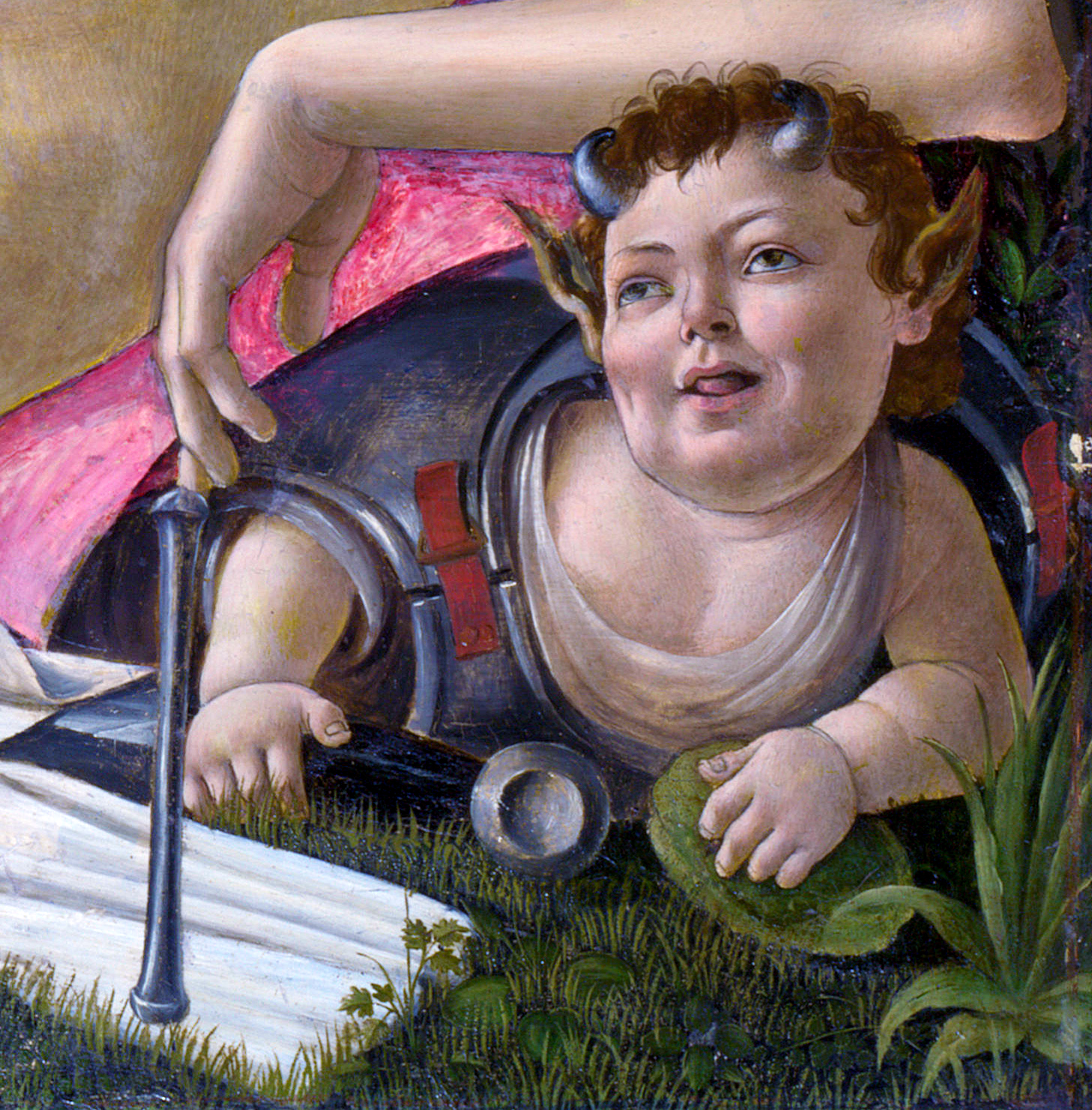
Detail from bottom right

In 2010, the plant held by the satyr in the bottom right corner of the painting was tentatively identified by the art historian David Bellingham as the fruit of Datura stramonium or thorn apple. This plant, often referred to as "poor man's acid", has properties likened to a mixture of opium and alcohol, and may cause fainting or drowsiness as its effects wear off. Others question how this plant, normally considered a native only of North America, might have reached Italy by the 1480s, and dismiss the idea. However, in 2017 the National Gallery website endorsed the identification as a "thorn apple".

Bellingham suggests that the growing plant in the bottom right corner is a species of aloe, credited by the Greeks with medicinal powers, as well as offering protection against evil spirits and enhancing sexual excitement. Bellingham proposes several layers of identification for the figures, generating different meanings. These include the couple as Adam and Eve.

== Possible models ==
As with many other of Botticelli's secular paintings, leading figures from Florentine high society have been proposed as the models for the figures. Giuliano di Piero de' Medici has been proposed as the athletic model for Mars and, almost inevitably, it has been suggested that Venus has the face of Simonetta Vespucci, a great beauty of the time, married to the cousin of Amerigo Vespucci. Giuliano di Piero de' Medici's candidacy as a model for Mars is somewhat problematic as he was assassinated in 1478, which is 5 years prior to the earliest date of the painting creation (1483). Simonetta Vespucci has been suggested as the model or inspiration for a great number of Botticelli's beauties, whose features by no means all have a close resemblance to each other.

Wilhelm von Bode (d. 1929) first proposed the pair as the models in this painting; in his interpretation, Mars is tired after jousting, and Venus appears to him in a dream, as his prize. Giuliano had chosen Simonetta as his "lady" in a famous joust in 1475, organized by his older brother Lorenzo de' Medici ("Lorenzo il Magnifico"), the effective ruler of Florence to celebrate a treaty with Venice and Milan. This lavish public show was commemorated in the poem by Poliziano, the Medici court poet, known as the Stanze or la Giostra ("Verses" or "The Joust"), giving a detailed account, including a description of Giuliano's banner with an image of Pallas Athene, which was painted by Botticelli.

Many later commentators have probably taken this scripted display of Petrarchan courtly love using the beautiful young wife of a political ally over-literally, generating a legend of an actual affair between the two. It is unlikely that any such affair took place; Giuliano's actual mistress, Fioretta Gorini, was well known (and their son became Pope Clement VII). Both Giuliano and Simonetta had been dead for several years when this painting was made: Simonetta died in 1476 at 22, and Giuliano had been assassinated in 1478 in the Pazzi conspiracy.

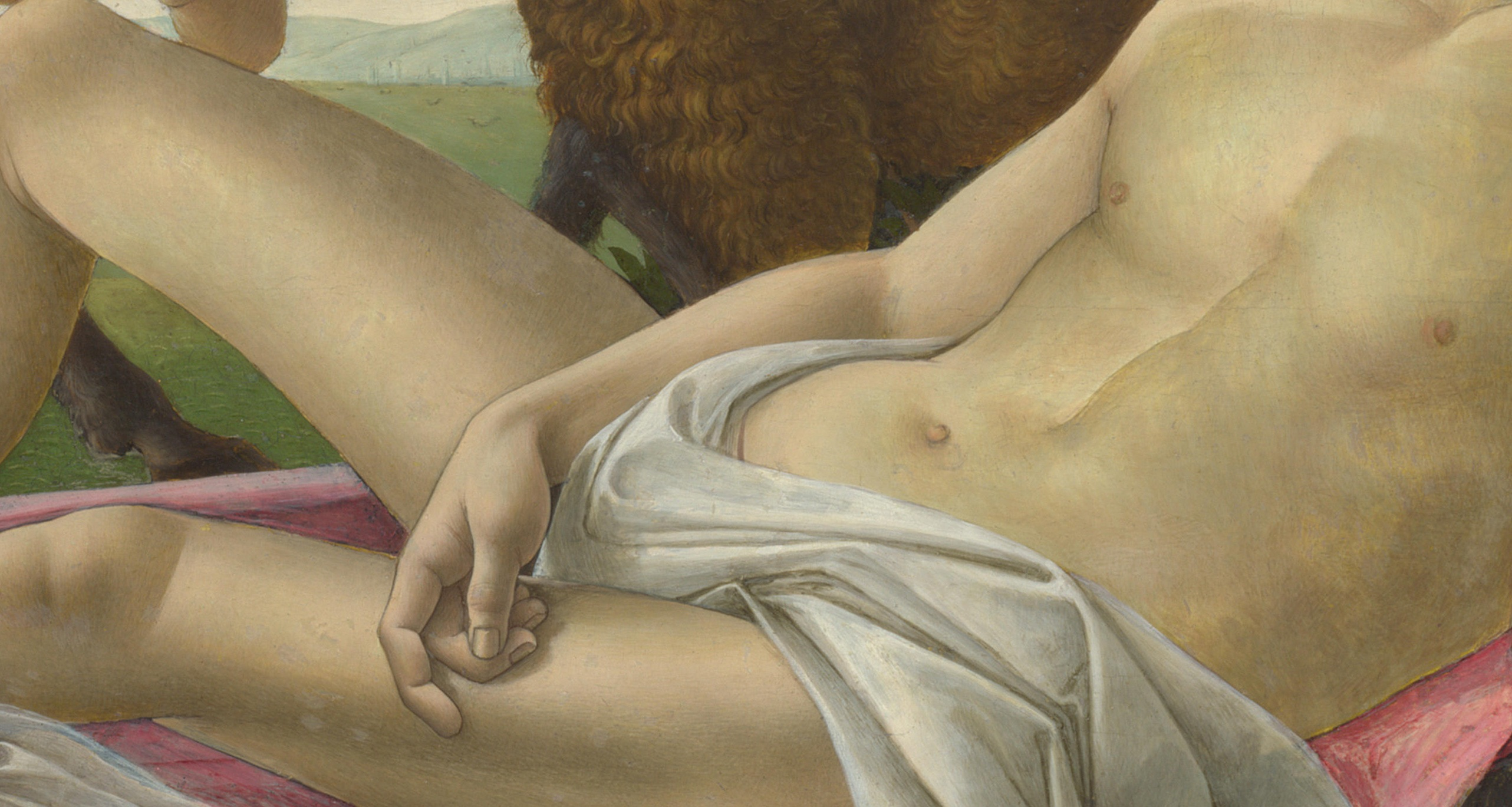
Detail of Mars

Stanze 122 describes how the hero found Venus "seated on the edge of her couch, just then released from the embrace of Mars, who lay on his back in her lap, still feeding his eyes on her face". However, the description, with Mars in Venus' lap, gazing up at her, is a poor fit to the painting. Poliziano was one of the humanist scholars in the court of Lorenzo de' Medici, and his stanze recount Giuliano di Piero de' Medici's prowess in a jousting tournament. The ultimate source for Poliziano's poem is Lucretius I.32–34.

== Provenance ==
Although today Botticelli is the most celebrated Florentine painter of second half of the 15th century, his reputation only reached this level in the late 19th century when his emphasis on line and contour chimed with the contemporary sensibility. Between 1857 and 1878, the National Gallery, London, acquired five of his works, including Venus and Mars.

This painting was bought in Florence by the English collector and dealer Alexander Barker between 1864 and 1869, and then bought by the National Gallery at the auction of Barker's collection at Christie's on 6–8 June 1874, for £1,050 (Lot 88). This is the only recorded sale on the open market of one of Botticelli's large mythological paintings, the others having all reached the collection of the Medici Grand-Dukes of Florence by an early date, and then passed to the Uffizi. The National Gallery bought 13 works at the sale, where the Director, Sir William Boxall, was accompanied by Benjamin Disraeli, then Chancellor of the Exchequer, who was keen to buy. The unfinished Nativity by Piero della Francesca was bought for £2,415, and a fresco Return of Ulysses by Pinturicchio for £2,152.

The price reached in 1874 is one of the examples used by Gerald Reitlinger to demonstrate the difference in the mid-Victorian period between the very high prices realized by contemporary art, and the modest ones for Old Masters; a disparity just as marked in the early 21st century. In 1873, it appears that The Otter Hunt by Edwin Landseer, who died that year, was sold privately for £10,000.

== Piero di Cosimo ==
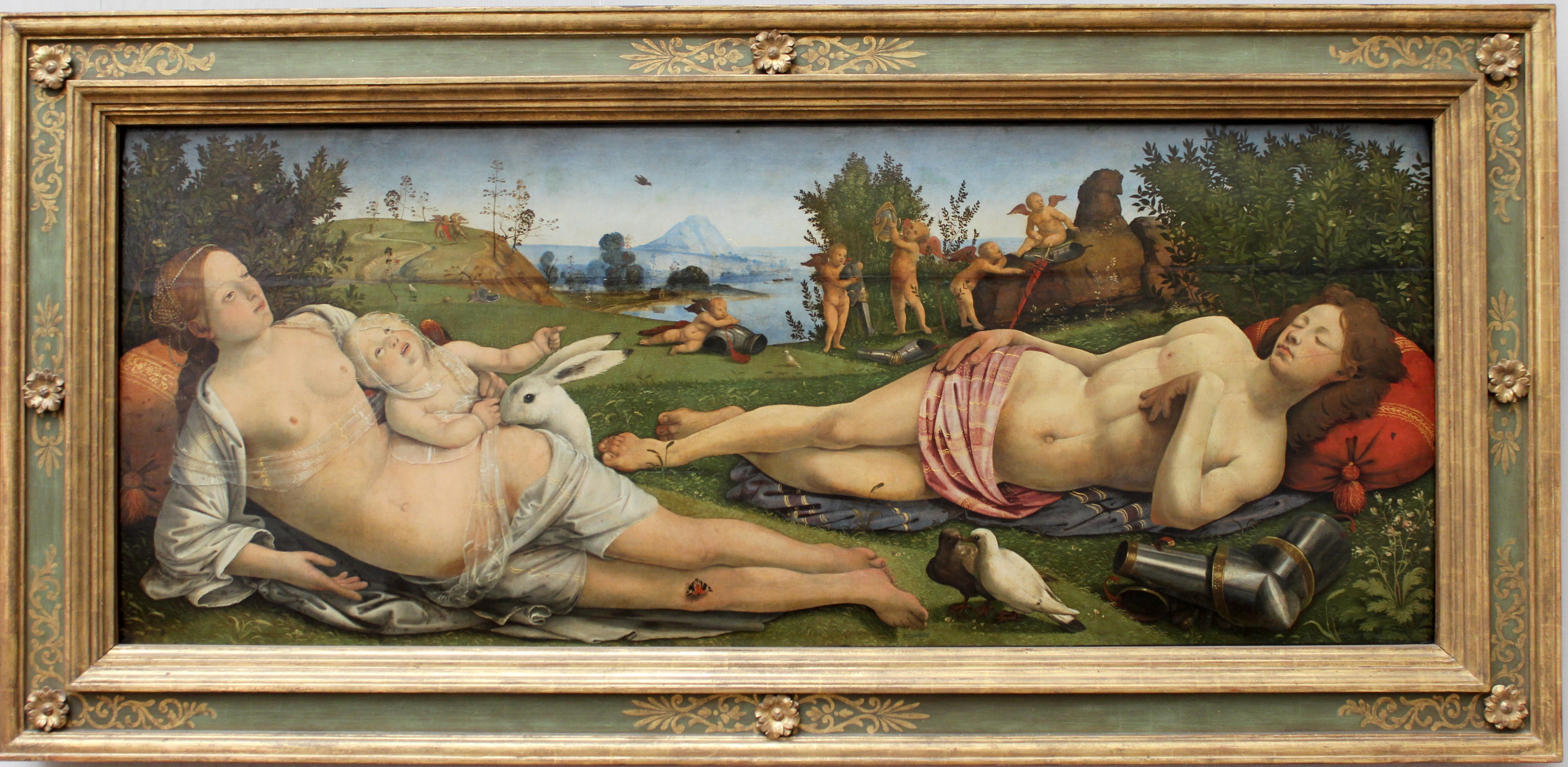
Piero di Cosimo, Venus, Mars and Cupid, Gemäldegalerie, Berlin, c. 1505

Though there are other paintings of Venus and Mars, Botticelli's work is often compared and contrasted with the Venus, Mars and Cupid by Piero di Cosimo (Gemäldegalerie, Berlin, c. 1505), a younger Florentine painter who had probably seen the Botticelli. The painting probably dates to around 1500-05, and later belonged to Giorgio Vasari. The similarities include the two figures reclining, with Mars asleep and Venus awake, and a group of infant attendants who play with Mars' armour, in a setting of bushes opening to a landscape. They contrast in atmosphere and most other aspects, and Piero has included an infant Cupid, a wide landscape and some of the animals that he loved to paint. For Erwin Panofsky, the Piero is an "enchantingly primitivistic pastoral" where Botticelli's version is a "solemnly classicizing allegory".

== See also ==
- List of works by Sandro Botticelli
