= Primavera (Botticelli) =

Painting by Sandro Botticelli

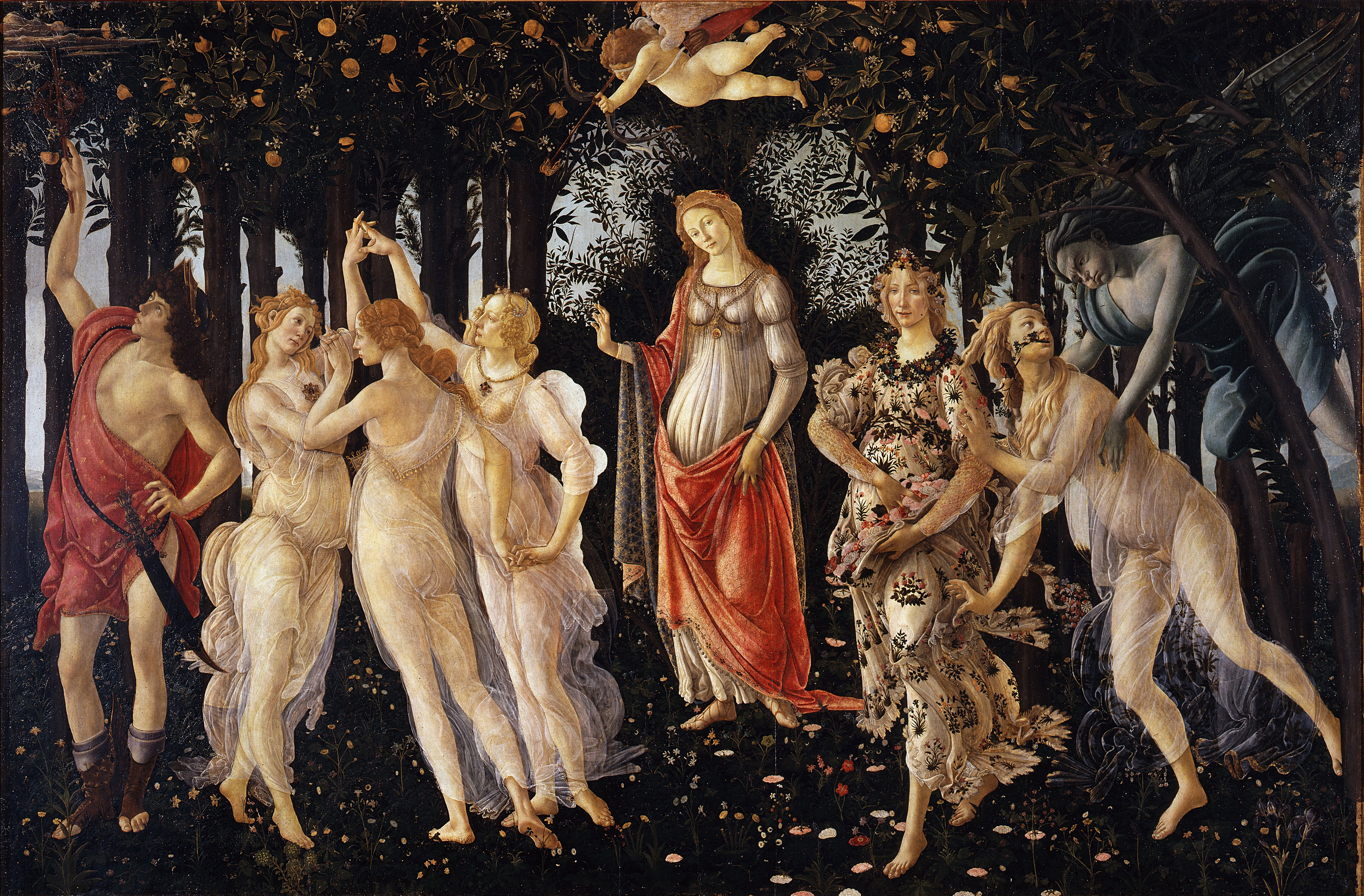
- Artist: Sandro Botticelli
- Year: late 1470s or early 1480s
- Medium: Tempera on panel
- Dimensions: 202 cm × 314 cm (80 in × 124 in)
- Location: Uffizi, Florence

Primavera (Italian pronunciation: [primaˈvɛːra], meaning "Spring") is a large panel painting in tempera paint by the Italian Renaissance painter Sandro Botticelli made in the late 1470s or early 1480s (datings vary). It has been described as "one of the most written about, and most controversial paintings in the world", and also "one of the most popular paintings in Western art".

The painting depicts a group of figures from classical mythology in a garden, but no story has been found that brings this particular group together. Most critics agree that the painting is an allegory based on the lush growth of Spring, but accounts of any precise meaning vary, though many involve the Renaissance Neoplatonism which then fascinated intellectual circles in Florence. The subject was first described as Primavera by the art historian Giorgio Vasari who saw it at Villa Castello, just outside Florence, by 1550.

Although the two are now known not to be a pair, the painting is inevitably discussed with Botticelli's other very large mythological painting, The Birth of Venus, also in the Uffizi. They are among the most famous paintings in the world, and icons of the Italian Renaissance; of the two, the Birth is even better known than the Primavera. As depictions of subjects from classical mythology on a very large scale, they were virtually unprecedented in Western art since classical antiquity.

The history of the painting is not certainly known; it may have been commissioned by one of the Medici family, but the certainty of its commission is unknown. It draws from a number of classical and Renaissance literary sources, including the works of the Ancient Roman poet Ovid and, less certainly, Lucretius, and may also allude to a poem by Poliziano, the Medici house poet who may have helped Botticelli devise the composition. Since 1919, the painting has been part of the collection of the Uffizi Gallery in Florence, Italy.

== Composition ==
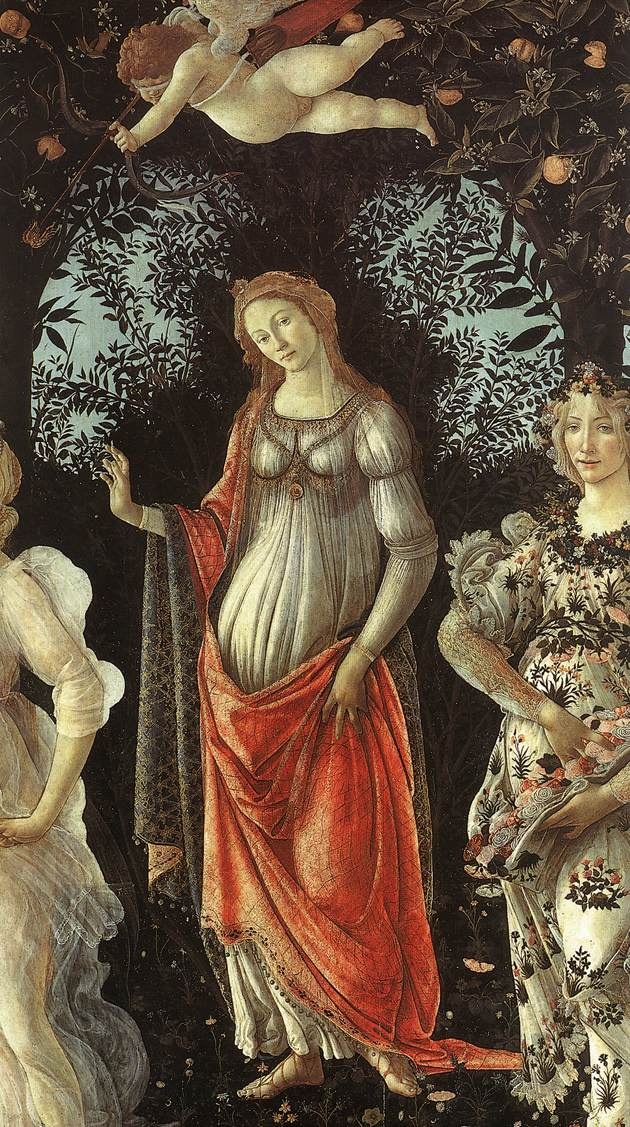
Venus standing in her arch.

The painting features six female figures and two male, along with a cupid, in an orange grove. The movement of the composition is from right to left, so following that direction the standard identification of the figures is as follows: At the far right, "Zephyrus, the biting wind of March, kidnaps and possesses the nymph Chloris, whom he later marries and transforms into a deity; she becomes the goddess of Spring, eternal bearer of life, and is seen scattering roses on the ground." The transformation is indicated by the flowers coming out of Chloris’ mouth. She either is shown twice, or the statuesque figure of Flora is a different person.

In the centre (but not exactly so) and somewhat set back from the other figures, stands Venus, a red-draped woman in blue. The trees behind her form a broken arch to draw the eye. In the air above her, a blindfolded Cupid aims his bow to the left. On the left of the painting, the Three Graces, a group of three females also in diaphanous white, join hands in a dance. At the extreme left Mercury, clothed in red with a sword and a helmet, raises his caduceus or wooden rod towards some wispy gray clouds.

The interactions between the figures are enigmatic. Zephyrus and Chloris are looking at each other. Flora and Venus look out of the picture, Venus returns the viewer's gaze. The Cupid is blindfolded, and Mercury has turned his back on the others, and looks up at the clouds. The central Grace looks towards him, while the other two seem to look at each other. Flora's smile was very unusual in painting at this date.

The pastoral scenery is elaborate. There are 500 identified plant species depicted in the painting, with about 190 different flowers, of which at least 130 can be specifically identified. The overall appearance, and size, of the painting is similar to that of the millefleur ("thousand flower") Flemish tapestries that were popular decorations for palaces at the time.

These tapestries had not caught up by the 1480s with the artistic developments of the Italian Renaissance, and the composition of the painting has aspects that belong to this still Gothic style. The figures are spread in a rough line across the front of the picture space, "set side by side like pearls on a string". It is now known that in the setting for which the painting was designed, the bottom was about at eye level, or slightly above it, partly explaining "the gently rising plane" on which the figures stand.

The feet of Venus are considerably higher than those of the others, showing she is behind them, but she is at the same scale, if not larger, than the other figures. Overlapping of other figures by Mercury's sword and Chloris' hands shows that they stand slightly in front of the left Grace and Flora, respectively, which might not be obvious otherwise, for example from their feet. It has been argued that the flowers do not grow smaller to the rear of the picture space, certainly a feature of the millefleur tapestries.

The costumes of the figures are versions of the dress of contemporary Florence, though the sort of "quasi-theatrical costumes designed for masquerades of the sort that Vasari wrote were invented by Lorenzo de' Medici for civic festivals and tournaments." The lack of an obvious narrative may relate to the world of pageants and tableaux vivants as well as typically static Gothic allegories.

== Meaning ==
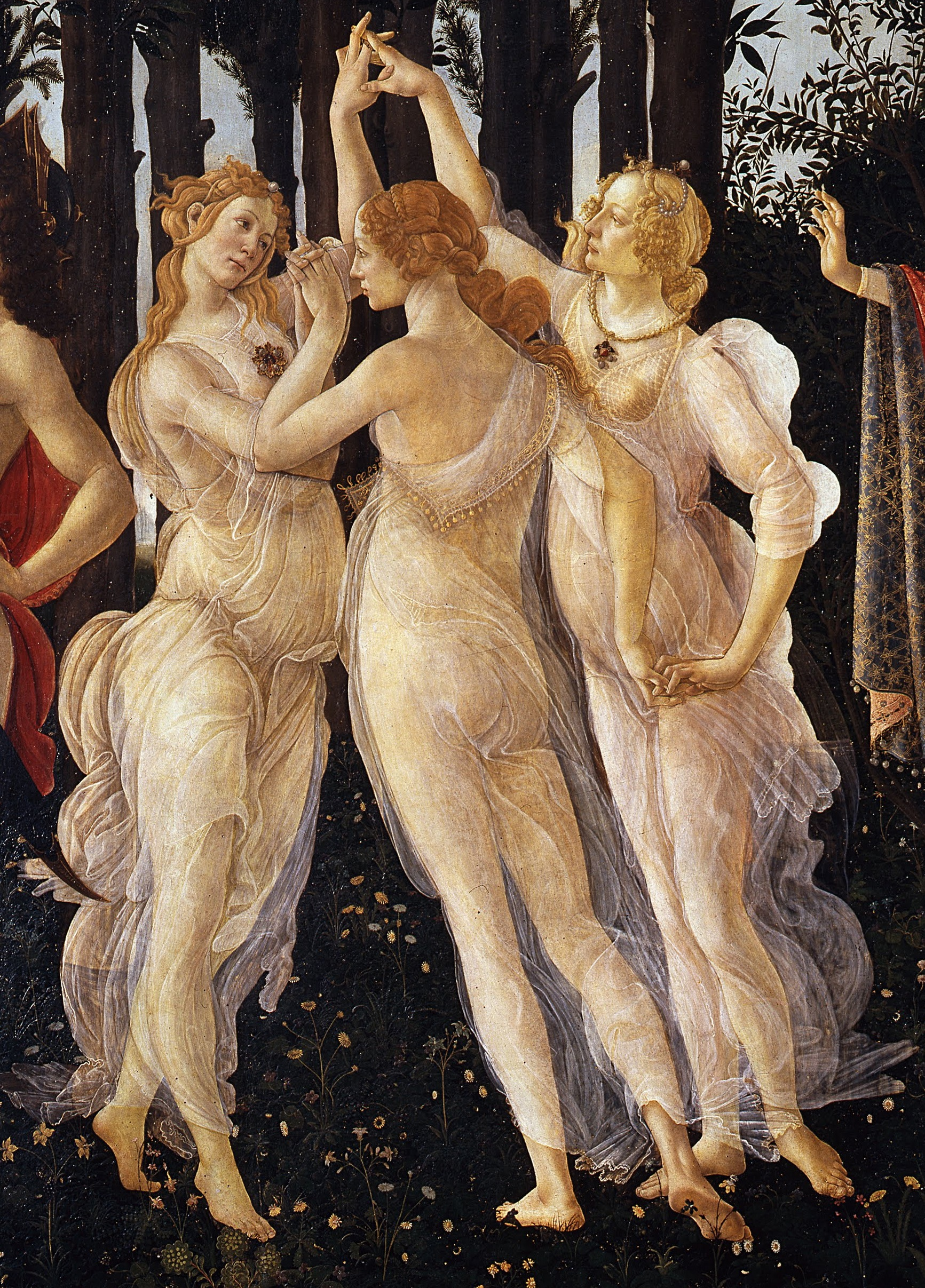
The Three Graces

Various interpretations of the figures have been set forth, but it is generally agreed that at least at one level the painting is "an elaborate mythological allegory of the burgeoning fertility of the world." It is thought that Botticelli had help devising the composition of the painting and whatever meanings it was intended to contain, as it appears that the painting reflects a deep knowledge of classical literature and philosophy that Botticelli is unlikely to have possessed. Poliziano is usually thought to have been involved in this, though Marsilio Ficino, another member of Lorenzo de' Medici's circle and a key figure in Renaissance Neoplatonism, has also often been mentioned.

One aspect of the painting is a depiction of the progress of the season of spring, reading from right to left. The wind of early Spring blows on the land and brings forth growth and flowers, presided over by Venus, goddess of April, with at the left Mercury, the god of the month of May in an early Roman calendar, chasing away the last clouds before summer. As well as being part of a sequence over the season, Mercury in dispelling the clouds is acting as the guard of the garden, partly explaining his military dress and his facing out of the picture space. A passage in Virgil's Aeneid describes him clearing the skies with his caduceus. A more positive, Neoplatonist view of the clouds is that they are "the benificent veils through which the splendour of transcendent truth may reach the beholder without destroying him."

Venus presides over the garden – an orange grove (a Medici symbol). It is also the Garden of the Hesperides of classical myth, from which the golden apples used in the Judgement of Paris came; the Hellenistic Greeks had decided that these were citrus fruits, exotic to them. According to Claudian, no clouds were allowed there. Venus stands in front of the dark leaves of a myrtle bush. According to Hesiod, Venus had been born of the sea after the semen of Uranus had fallen upon the waters. Coming ashore in a shell she had clothed her nakedness in myrtle, and so the plant became sacred to her. Venus appears here in her character as a goddess of marriage, clothed and with her hair modestly covered, as married women were expected to appear in public.

The Three Graces are sisters, and traditionally accompany Venus. In classical art (but not literature) they are normally nude, and typically stand still as they hold hands, but the depiction here is very close to one adapting Seneca by Leon Battista Alberti in his De pictura (1435), which Botticelli certainly knew. From the left they are identified by Edgar Wind as Voluptas, Castitas, and Pulchritudo (Pleasure, Chastity and Beauty), though other names are found in mythology, and many writers, including Lightbown and the Ettlingers, refrain from naming Botticelli's Graces at all.

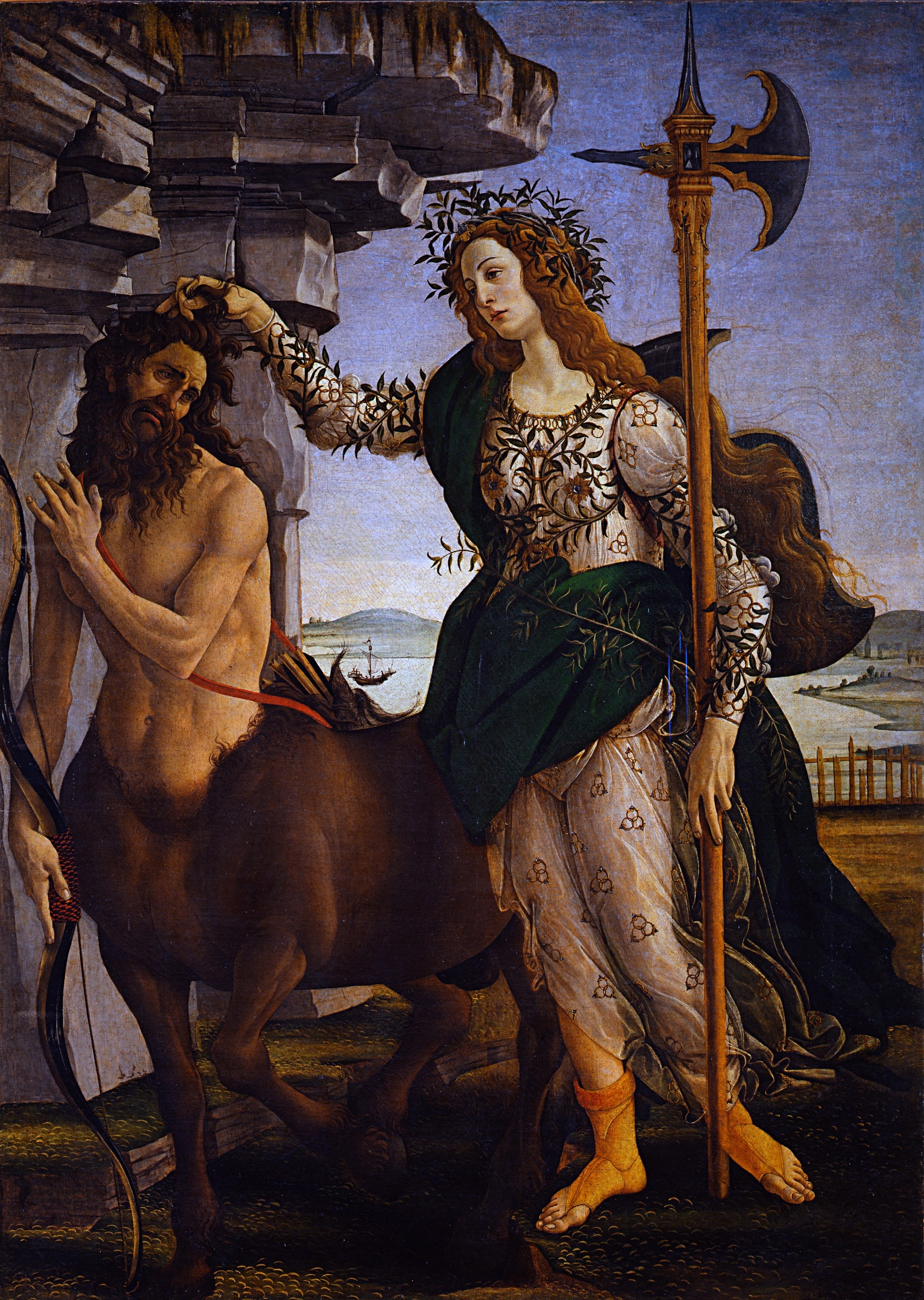
Botticelli's Pallas and the Centaur (1482) has been proposed as the companion piece to Primavera.

Cupid's arrow is aimed at the middle Grace — Chastity, according to Wind — and the impact of love on chastity, leading to a marriage, features in many interpretations. Chastity looks towards Mercury, and some interpretations, especially those identifying the figures as modelled on actual individuals, see this couple as one to match Chloris and Zephyrus on the other side of the painting.

In a different interpretation the Earthy carnal love represented by Zephyrus to the right is renounced by the central figure of the Graces, who has turned her back to the scene, unconcerned by the threat represented to her by Cupid. Her focus is on Mercury, who himself gazes beyond the canvas at what many believe hung as the companion piece to Primavera: Pallas and the Centaur, in which "love oriented towards knowledge" (embodied by Pallas Athena) proves triumphant over lust (symbolized by the centaur).

The basic identification of the figures is now widely agreed, but in the past other names have sometimes been used for the females on the right, who are two stages of the same person in the usual interpretation. The woman in the flowered dress may be called Primavera (a personification of Spring), with Flora the figure pursued by Zephyrus. One scholar suggested in 2011 that the central figure is not Venus at all, but Persephone.

In addition to its overt meaning, the painting has been interpreted as an illustration of the ideal of Neoplatonic love popularized among the Medicis and their followers by Marsilio Ficino. The Neoplatonic philosophers saw Venus as ruling over both Earthly and divine love and argued that she was the classical equivalent of the Virgin Mary; this is alluded to by the way she is framed in an altar-like setting that is similar to contemporary images of the Virgin Mary. Venus' hand gesture of welcome, probably directed to the viewer, is the same as that used by Mary to the Archangel Gabriel in contemporary paintings of the Annunciation.

Punning allusions to Medici names probably include the golden balls of the oranges, recalling those on the Medici coat of arms, the laurel trees at right, for either Lorenzo, and the flames on the costume of both Mercury (for whom they are a regular attribute) and Venus, which are also an attribute of Saint Laurence (Lorenzo in Italian). Mercury was the god of medicine and "doctors", medici in Italian. Such puns for the Medici, and in Venus and Mars the Vespucci, run through all Botticelli's mythological paintings.

== Sources ==
Of the very many literary sources that may have fed into the painting, the clearest was first noted in modern times by Aby Warburg in 1893, in his seminal dissertation on the painting. The group at the right of the painting was inspired by a description by the Roman poet Ovid of the arrival of Spring (Fasti, Book 5, 2 May). In this the wood nymph Chloris recounts how her naked charms attracted the first wind of Spring, Zephyr. Zephyr pursued her and as she was raped, flowers sprang from her mouth and she became transformed into Flora, goddess of flowers. In Ovid's work the reader is told 'till then the earth had been but of one colour'. From Chloris' name the colour may be guessed to have been green – the Greek word for green is khloros, the root of words like chlorophyll – and may be why Botticeli painted Zephyr in shades of bluish-green.

Other specific elements may have been derived from a poem by Poliziano. As Poliziano's poem, "Rusticus", was published in 1483 and the painting is generally held to have been completed by around 1482, some scholars have argued that the influence was reversed, bearing in mind that Poliziano is generally thought to have helped with devising the allegory in the painting.

Another inspiration for the painting seems to have been the poem by Lucretius "De rerum natura", which includes the lines, "Spring-time and Venus come, and Venus' boy, / The winged harbinger, steps on before, / And hard on Zephyr's foot-prints Mother Flora, / Sprinkling the ways before them, filleth all / With colors and with odors excellent."

Where there is a plethora of literary sources, most of them probably not known directly by Botticelli, or set out for him by advisors, the visual sources are a different matter:

But where, in the visual rather than the literary sense, did the vision come from? That is the mystery of genius. From antique sarcophagi, from a few gems and reliefs, and perhaps some fragments of Aretine ware; from those drawings of classical remains by contemporary artists which were circulated in the Florentine workshops, like the architects' pattern-books of the 18th century; from such scanty and mediocre material, Botticelli has created one of the most personal evocations of physical beauty in the whole of art, the Three Graces of the Primavera. (Kenneth Clark)

== History ==
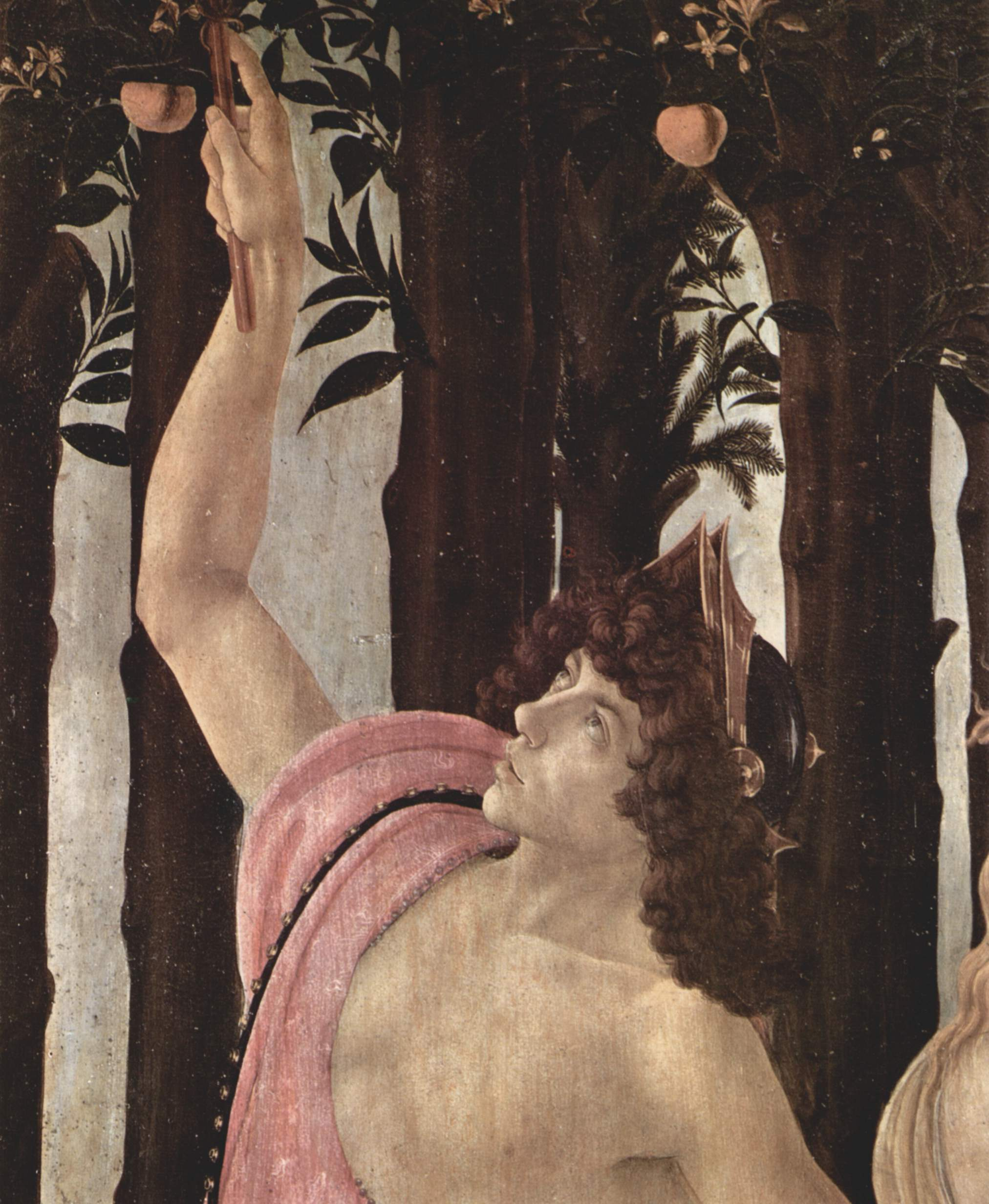
Mercury may have been modeled after Lorenzo di Pierfrancesco de' Medici, or possibly his cousin Giuliano de' Medici.

The origin of the painting is unclear. Botticelli was away in Rome for many months in 1481/82, painting in the Sistine Chapel, and suggested dates are in recent years mostly later than this, but still sometimes before. Thinking has been somewhat changed by the publication in 1975 of an inventory from 1499 of the collection of Lorenzo di Pierfrancesco de' Medici.

The 1499 inventory records it hanging in the city palace of Lorenzo di Pierfrancesco de' Medici and his brother Giovanni "Il Popolano". They were the cousins of Lorenzo de' Medici ("Lorenzo il Magnifico"), who was effectively the ruler of Florence, and after their father's early death had been his wards. It hung over a large lettuccio, an elaborate piece of furniture including a raised base, a seat and a backboard, probably topped with a cornice. The bottom of the painting was probably at about the viewer's eye-level, so rather higher than it is hung today.

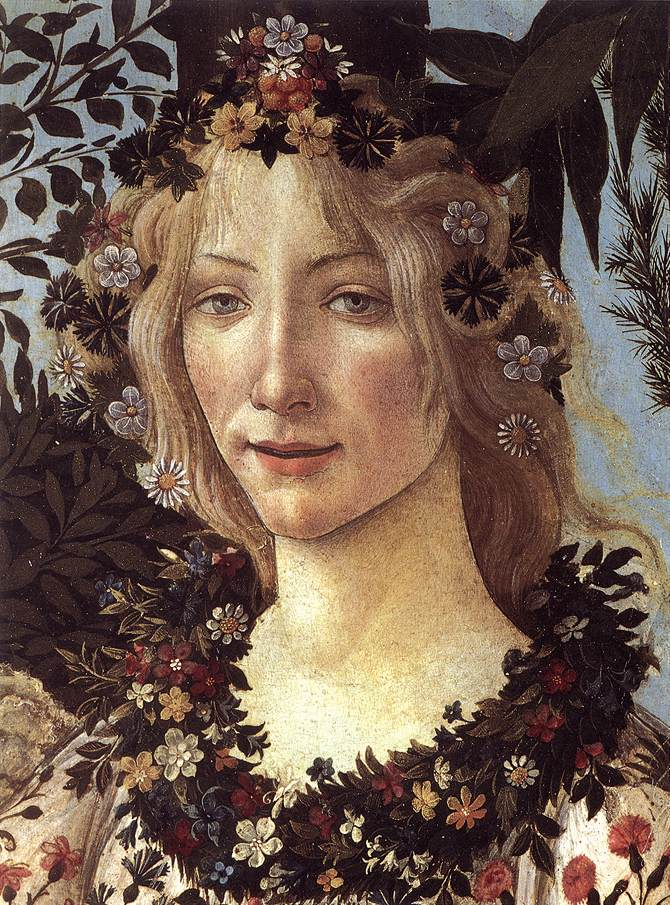
Flora, the goddess of flowers and the season of spring.

In the same room was Botticelli's Pallas and the Centaur, and also a large tondo with the Virgin and Child. The tondo is now unidentified, but is a type of painting especially associated with Botticelli. This was given the highest value of the three paintings, at 180 lire. A further inventory of 1503 records that the Primavera had a large white frame.

In the first edition of his Life of Botticelli, published in 1550, Giorgio Vasari said that he had seen this painting, and the Birth of Venus, hanging in the Medici country Villa di Castello. Before the inventory was known it was usually believed that both paintings were made for the villa, probably soon after it was acquired in 1477, either commissioned by Lorenzo di Pierfrancesco or perhaps given to him by his older cousin and guardian Lorenzo de' Medici. Rather oddly, Vasari says both paintings contained female nudes, which is not strictly the case here.

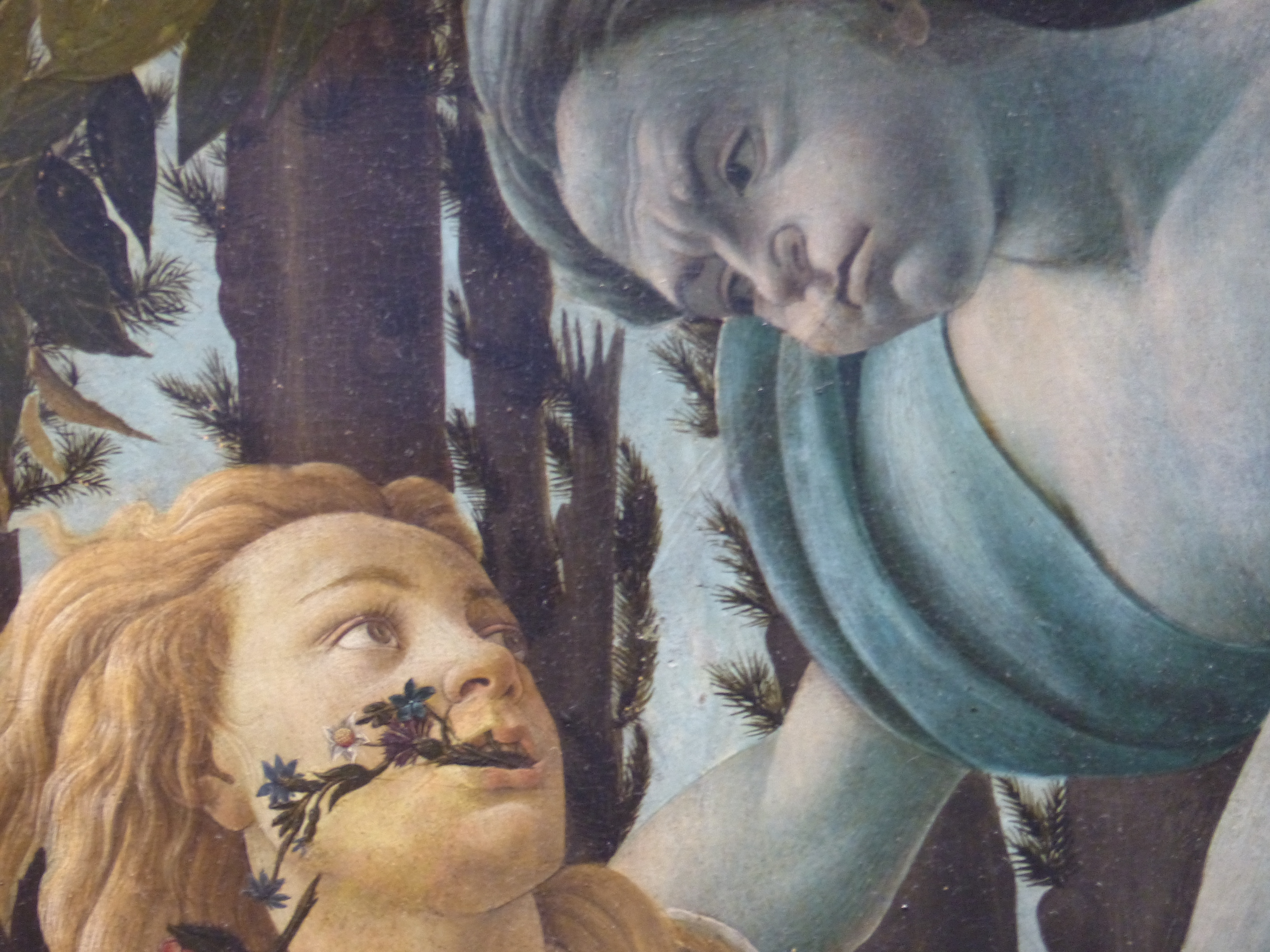
Chloris and Zephyrus.

Most scholars now connect the painting to the marriage of Lorenzo di Pierfrancesco de' Medici. Paintings and furniture were often given as presents celebrating weddings. The marriage was on 19 July 1482, but had been postponed after the death of the elder Lorenzo's mother on 25 March. It was originally planned for May. Recent datings tend to prefer the early 1480s, after Botticelli's return from Rome, suggesting it was directly commissioned in connection with this wedding, a view supported by many.

Another older theory, assuming an early date, suggests the older Lorenzo commissioned the portrait to celebrate the birth of his nephew Giulio di Giuliano de' Medici (who later became Pope), but changed his mind after the assassination of Giulo's father, his brother Giuliano in 1478, having it instead completed as a wedding gift for Lorenzo di Pierfrancesco.

It is frequently suggested that Lorenzo di Pierfrancesco is the model for Mercury in the portrait, and his bride Semiramide represented as Flora (or Venus). In older theories, placing the painting in the 1470s, it was proposed that the model for Venus was Simonetta Vespucci, wife of Marco Vespucci and according to popular legend the mistress of Giuliano de' Medici (who is also sometimes said to have been the model for Mercury); these identifications largely depend on an early date, in the 1470s, as both were dead by 1478. Simonetta was the aunt of Lorenzo's bride Semiramide. Summarizing the many interpretations of the painting, Leopold Ettlinger includes "descending to the ludricous – a Wagnerian pantomime enacted in memory of the murdered Giuliano de' Medici and his beloved Simonetta Vespucci with the Germanic Norns disguised as the Mediterranean Graces."

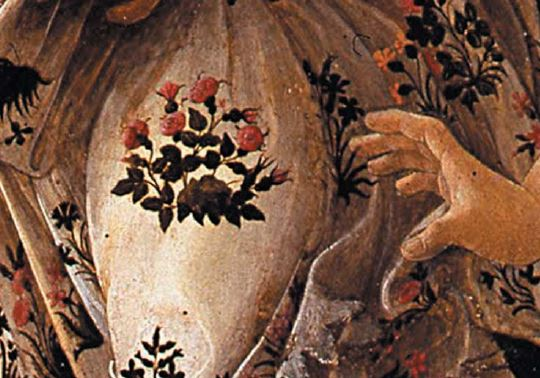
Detail of Flora's gown

Whenever this painting and the Birth of Venus were united at Castello, they have remained together ever since. They stayed in Castello until 1815, when they were transferred to the Uffizi. For some years until 1919 they were kept in the Galleria dell'Accademia, another government museum in Florence. Since 1919, it has hung in the Uffizi Gallery in Florence. During the Italian campaign of World War II, the picture was moved to Montegufoni Castle about ten miles south west of Florence to protect it from wartime bombing.

It was returned to the Uffizi Gallery where it remains to the present day. In 1978, the painting was restored. The work has darkened considerably over the course of time.

== See also ==
- List of works by Sandro Botticelli

== Sources ==
- Capretti, Elena (1 January 2002). Botticelli. Giunti Editore Firenze Italy. ISBN 978-88-09-21433-0.
- Cheney, Liana (1985). Quattrocento Neoplatonism and Medici humanism in Botticelli's mythological paintings. University Press of America.
- Clark, Kenneth (1949), The Nude. A Study in Ideal Form, various eds., page refs from Pelican ed. of 1960
- Cunningham, Lawrence S.; John J. Reich (16 January 2009). Culture & Values, Volume II: A Survey of the Humanities with Readings. Cengage Learning. ISBN 978-0-495-56926-8.
- Deimling, Barbara (1 May 2000). Sandro Botticelli, 1444/45-1510. Taschen. ISBN 978-3-8228-5992-6.
- Dempsey, Charles (2000), "Botticelli, Sandro", Grove Art Online, Oxford Art Online. Oxford University Press. Web. 15 May. 2017.
- "Ettlingers": Ettlinger, Leopold with Helen S. Ettlinger (1976), Botticelli, Thames and Hudson (World of Art), ISBN 0500201536.
- Fisher, Celia (2011). Flowers of the Renaissance. London: Lincoln.
- Fossi, Gloria (1998). Botticelli. Primavera (Inglese ed.). Giunti Editore Firenze Italy. ISBN 978-88-09-21459-0.
- Foster, Richard; Tudor-Craig, Pamela (1986). The Secret Life of Paintings. Woodbridge, UK: Boydell Press. ISBN 978-0-85115-439-8.
- Harris, Beth; Steven Zucker. "Botticelli's Primavera". SmARThistory. Khan Academy. Archived from the original on 6 March 2012.
- Healey, Tim (5 January 2011). "Denis Healey: the artist within". The Guardian.
- Heyl, Charles Christian (1912). The art of the Uffizi Palace and the Florence Academy. L.C. Page. p. 88.
- Legouix, Susan (2004), Botticelli (rev. ed.), Chaucer Press, ISBN 1904449212.
- Lightbown, Ronald (1989), Sandro Botticelli: Life and Work, Thames and Hudson.
- Lucretius. On the Nature of Things, William Ellery Leonard, trnsl. at Project Gutenberg
- Snow-Smith, Joanne (1993). The Primavera of Sandro Botticelli: A Neoplatonic Interpretation. Peter Lang International Academic Publishers. ISBN 978-0820417363.
- Steinmann, Ernst (1901). Botticelli. Velhagen & Klasing. p. 78.
- Vasari (1550, 1568), selected & ed. George Bull, Artists of the Renaissance, Penguin 1965 (page nos from BCA edn, 1979). Vasari Life on-line (in a different translation)
- Wind, Edgar (1958), Pagan Mysteries in the Renaissance, 1967 ed., Peregrine Books.
