= Camilla (mythology) =

Mythological figure in Virgil's Aeneid

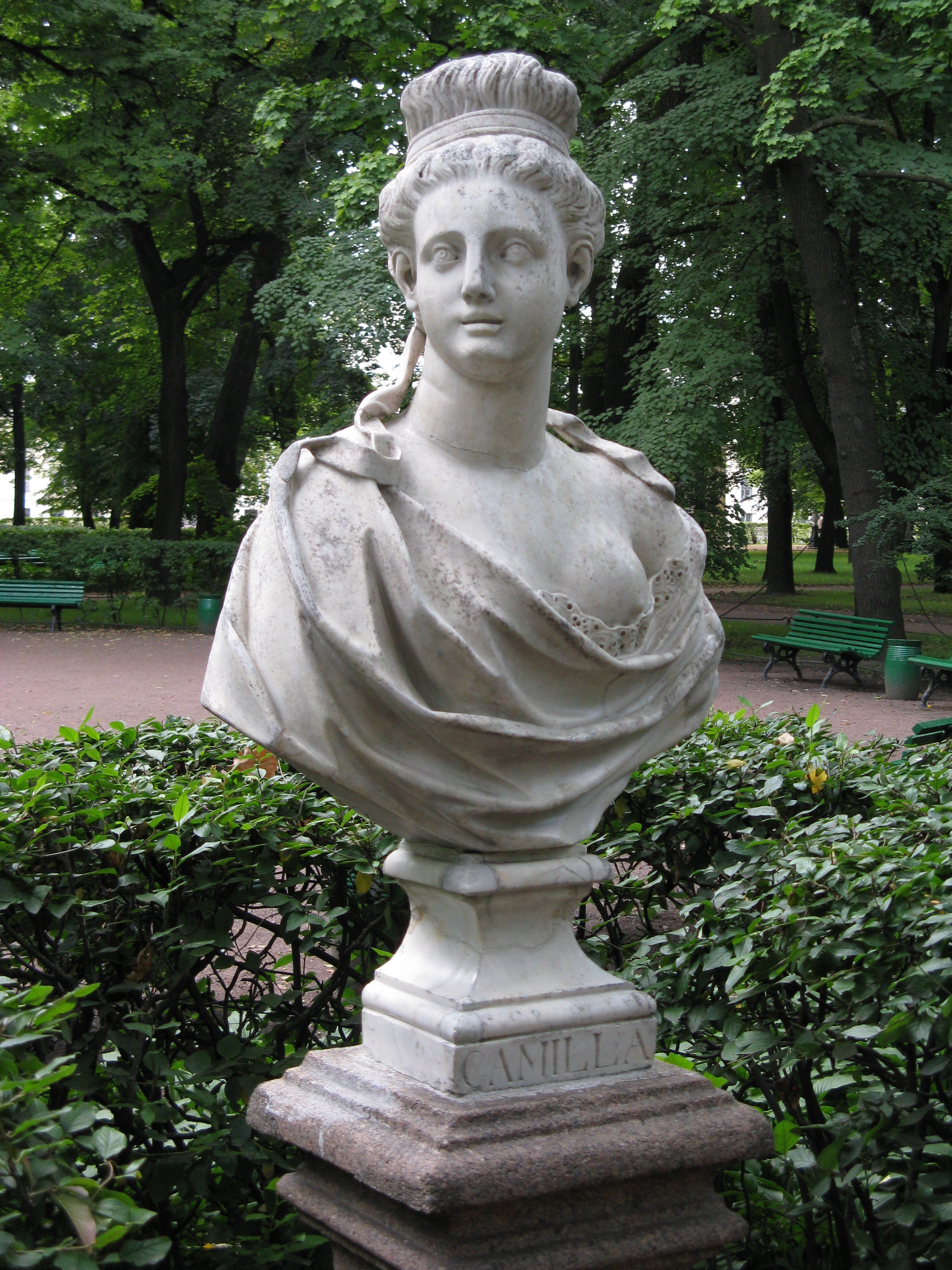
18th-century AD bust of Camilla at the Summer Garden

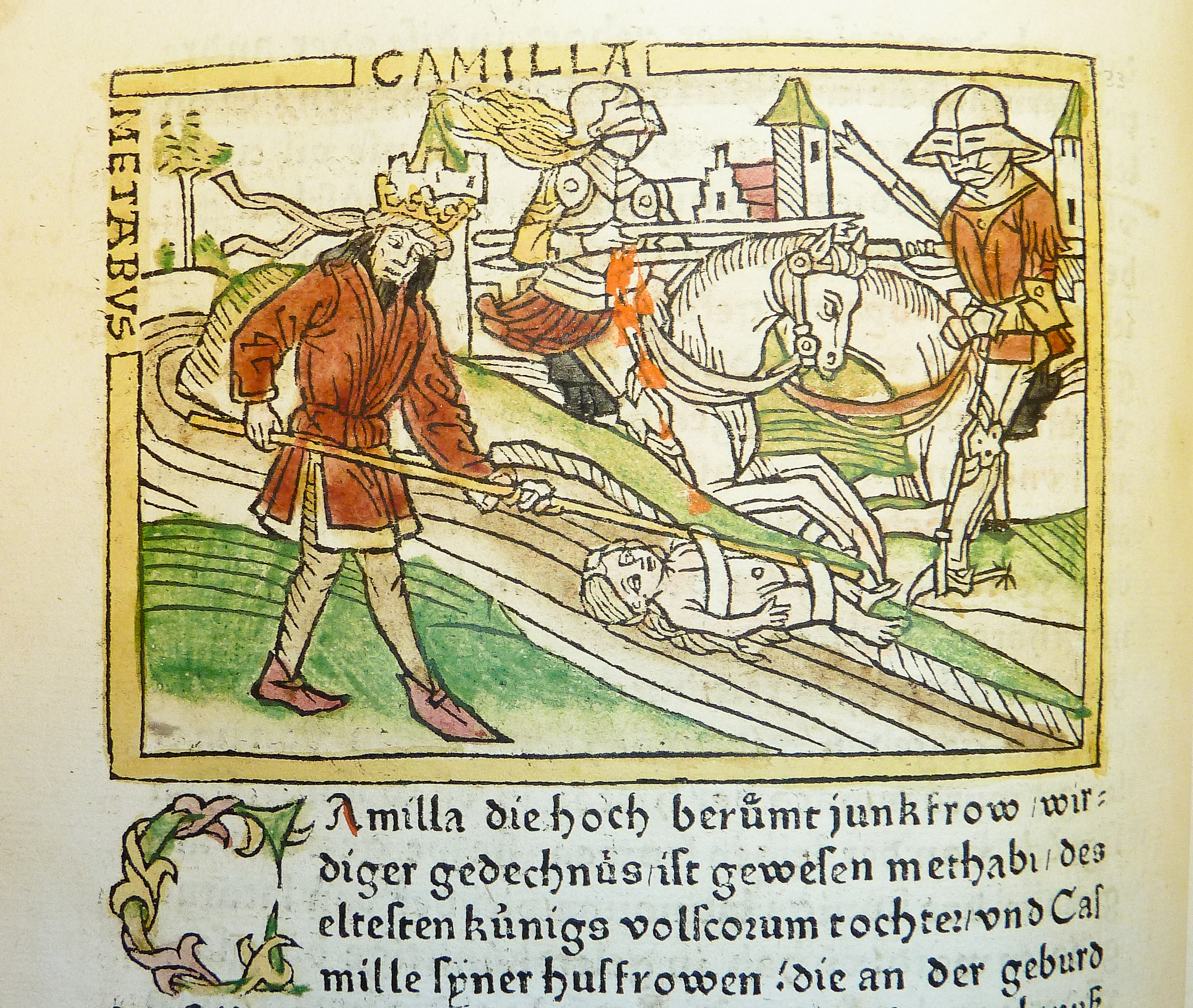
Camilla and Metabus flee into exile, from a book printed at Ulm c. 1474

In Virgil's Aeneid, Camilla of the Volsci is a warrior who fights against the Trojans during the war in Latium. She stars in Book 11, where she leads a battle against the Trojans and is eventually killed. Camilla is the daughter of King Metabus and Queen Casmilla.

== Aeneid ==
Camilla appears in books 7 and 11 of the Aeneid. Virgil says that Camilla was so fast on her feet that she could run over a field of wheat without breaking the tops of the plants, or over the ocean without wetting her feet.

When Camilla was an infant, her father Metabus was driven from his throne and chased into the wilderness by armed Volsci, holding Camilla in his hands. The river Amasenus blocked his path, and, fearing for the child's welfare, Metabus bound Camilla to a spear. He promised Diana that Camilla would be her servant, a warrior virgin. He then safely threw her to the other side, and swam across to retrieve her. The baby Camilla was suckled by a mare, and once her "first firm steps had [been] taken, the small palms were armed with a keen javelin; her sire a bow and quiver from her shoulder slung." She was raised in her childhood to be a huntress and kept the companionship of her father and the shepherds in the hills and woods.

In Book 11, Camilla rallied the Latins in fighting against Aeneas and the Trojans in the war sparked by the courting of Princess Lavinia. After a short break in the battle when both sides are burying their dead, the fight starts up again, and the Latins are still in their city. Camilla meets with King Turnus and offers to lead a distraction against the Trojan and Etruscan cavalry while Turnus defends the city walls. He amends the plan so he can prepare an ambush for Aeneas instead, and leaves to prepare the trap.

Diana then speaks to her attendant, Upis, about Camilla, explaining how much she cares for the warrior and describing her backstory. Diana asks Upis to protect Camilla and gives advance permission to avenge Camilla's death.

The Trojans, Etruscans, and Latin cavalry meet on the battlefield, with the Latin side led by Messapus, Coras, and Camilla. Both sides alternate fleeing and pursuing each other, until they finally meet in protracted battle. Camilla fights with a spear, axe, and arrows, surrounded by other warrior maidens. She kills many opponents, and is described as if she were the Amazon queens Hippolyta or Penthesilea. She then fights against Ornytus, Orsilochus, Butes, and the son of Aunus. She kills them all, even after the son of Aunus tries to escape multiple times.

Jupiter then inspires Tarchon to rally the Etruscans. Tarchon chides his men and mocks Camilla for being a woman, and goes off to fight the Latin ambassador Venulus. As they fight, the Etruscans rally. Arruns, a Trojan ally, stalks Camilla on the battlefield. He carefully tries to avoid notice, trembling as he spies on her, so he can try to kill her safely. Camilla then sees Chloreus, a Trojan wearing unique armor, and pursues him so she can take it as a prize. When she is distracted, Arruns raises his spear and prays to Apollo that he might kill her and return safely from battle. Apollo grants the first part of the prayer, letting the spear hit Camilla in her breast, so she falls, as Arruns flees. Camilla attempts to pull the spear free as she lies dying, but it is stuck. She then turns to her most trusted attendant, Acca, and tells her to quickly share her last words with Turnus, that he needs to keep the Trojans from the city. Camilla kisses Acca, then slides to the ground and dies.

Diana's attendant, Upis, at her mistress' behest, avenged Camilla's death by slaying Arruns. She saw him fleeing from the battlefield and flew to a nearby hill, where she shot him as he celebrated his escape. Upis then left to tell Diana what had happened.

== Background ==
Modern scholars are unsure if Camilla was entirely an original invention of Virgil, or represents some actual Roman myth. In his book Virgil's Aeneid: Semantic Relations and Proper Names, Michael Paschalis speculates that Virgil chose the river Amasenus (today the Amaseno, near Priverno, ancient Privernum) as a poetic allusion to the Amazons with whom Camilla is associated. Virgil seems to have been inspired by the myth of Harpalyce, a girl suckled by animals and raised to be a tough warrior, for his portrayal of Camilla.

Camilla is one of the few women in the Aeneid that has an extended backstory shared. Only Andromache and Dido's stories are given similar amounts of attention, and Dido and Camilla's stories are noteworthy for being told by goddesses.

Giovanni Boccaccio's De mulieribus claris includes a segment on Camilla. She is not often a subject in art, but the female figure in Pallas and the Centaur by Sandro Botticelli (c. 1482, Uffizi) was called "Camilla" in the earliest record of the painting, an inventory of 1499, but then in an inventory of 1516 she is called Minerva, which remains her usual identification in recent times. She was the subject of an internationally successful opera, Camilla by Giovanni Bononcini (1696).

Camilla is similar to Penthesilea of Greek mythology.

== See also ==
- 107 Camilla

== Notes ==
- Lightbown, Ronald, Sandro Botticelli: Life and Work, 1989, Thames and Hudson
- Virgil, Aeneid, Theodore C. Williams. trans. Boston. Houghton Mifflin Co. 1910. Online version
