= Herbert Koch (archaeologist) =

German archaeologist (1880–1962)

Herbert Guido Koch (1 July 1880, in Reichenbach – 25 September 1962, in Hamburg) was a German classical archaeologist.

From 1899 he studied archaeology, art history and German philology at the Ludwig-Maximilians-Universität München, the Friedrich Wilhelm University of Berlin, and Leipzig University, and from 1904 conducted archaeological research in Rome, where he later worked as an assistant at the German Archaeological Institute (1909 to 1910, and 1914 to 1915). From 1910 to 1911, he took a study trip to Paris, London, Greece, Asia Minor and Egypt, then from 1912 to 1913 worked as a scientific assistant at the German Archaeological Institute in Athens.

In 1913, he obtained his habilitation at the University of Bonn, and in 1918 became an associate professor of classical archaeology at the University of Jena. In 1923, he attained a full professorship, and in 1929 returned to Leipzig University as director of the Archaeological Institute. From 1931 to 1950, he served as professor of classical archaeology at the University of Halle. Among his better known students was art historian Leopold Ettlinger (1913–1989).

== Selected works ==
- Ueber das Verhältnis von Drama und Geschichte bei Friedrich Hebbel, 1904 – On the relationship of drama and history by Friedrich Hebbel.
- Dachterrakotten aus Campanien mit Ausschluss von Pompei, 1912 – Roof terracotta from Campania with the exclusion of Pompeii.
- Probleme der Spätantike, (with Richard Laqueur and Wilhelm Weber, 1930) – Problems of late antiquity.
- Römische Kunst, 1949 – Roman art.
- Der griechisch-dorische Tempel, 1951 – Doric Greek temples.
- Studien zum Theseustempel in Athen, 1955 – Studies of the Theseus temple in Athens.
- Von ionischer Baukunst, 1956 – On Ionian architecture.
