= Calumny of Apelles =

Painting by Sandro Botticelli

The Calumny of Apelles
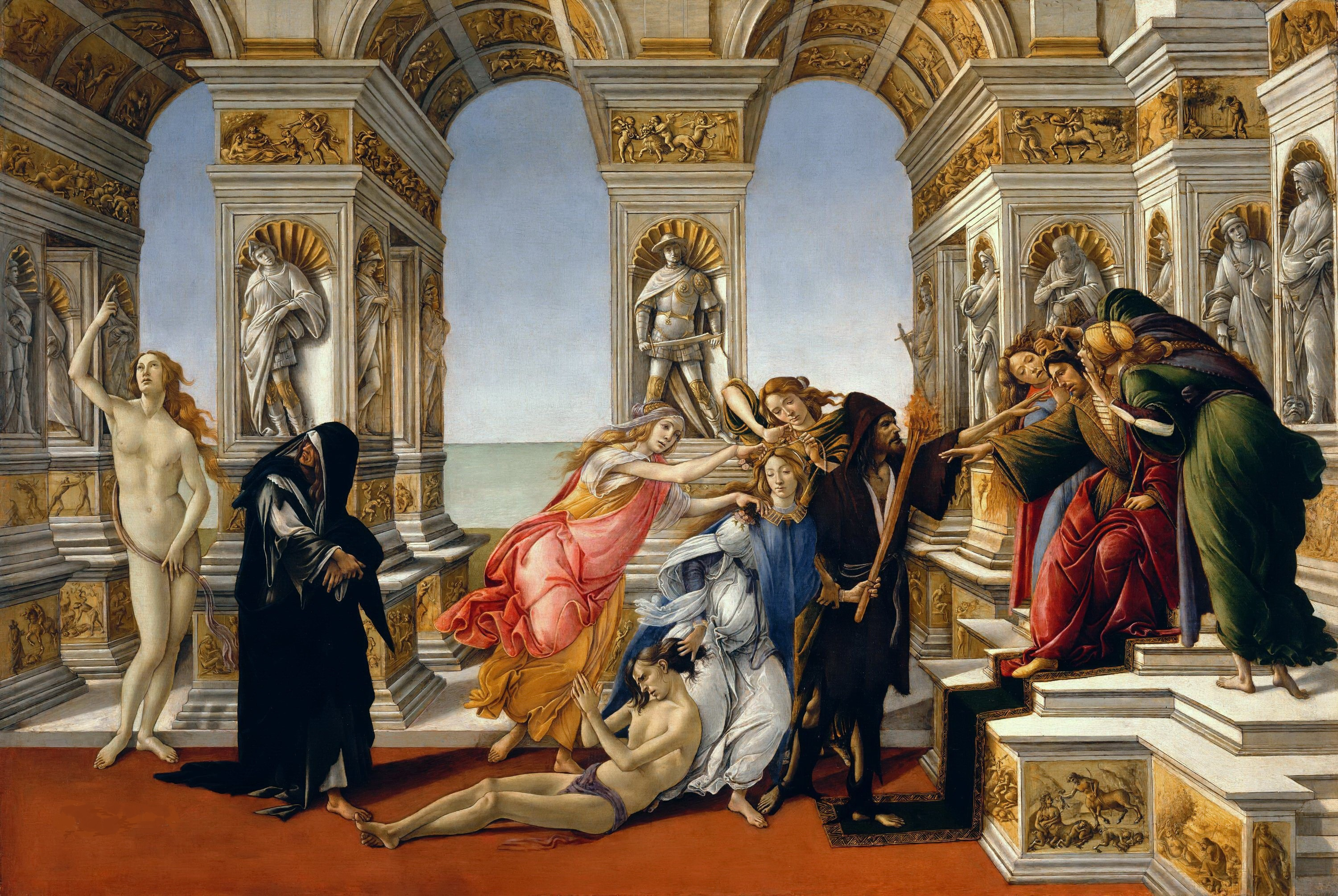
- Artist: Sandro Botticelli
- Year: 1494–95
- Medium: Tempera on panel
- Dimensions: 62 cm × 91 cm (24 in × 36 in)
- Location: Uffizi, Florence

The Calumny of Apelles is a panel painting in tempera by the Italian Renaissance painter Sandro Botticelli. Based on the description of a lost ancient painting by Apelles, the work was completed in about 1494–95, and is now in the Uffizi, Florence.

The content of Apelles' painting, as described by Lucian, became popular in Renaissance Italy, and Botticelli was neither the first nor last Italian Renaissance artist to depict it. Leon Battista Alberti had praised it and recommended it as a subject for artists to recreate in his highly influential De pictura of 1435, and there were four translations of Lucian's Greek into Latin or Italian during the 15th century.

A number of Botticelli's secular works show an interest in recreating some of the lost glories of Ancient Greek painting, which are recorded in classical literature, especially the ekphrasis, a popular literary genre consisting of the description of a painting, which had an obvious utility before reproductions were widespread. His Mars and Venus, painted some ten years earlier, is generally agreed to borrow part of its composition, the infant satyrs playing with Mars' armour, from another ekphrasis by Lucian, but no other Botticelli painting is clearly an attempt to recreate an ancient composition almost in full.

The painting is an allegory with nine figures (as well as many painted statues) but at 62 x 91 cm is far smaller than his large mythological paintings, but larger than the usual size of his spalliere pieces intended to be fitted into panelling or furniture. However, it is comparable in size to his Mystical Nativity, and like that may have been painted for his own use. It was completed around 1494 or 1495, and is probably the last secular painting of his to survive. It is often speculated that Botticelli had a specific slandered individual in mind, perhaps himself, or Savonarola. In 1502, some years after the probable date of the painting, an anonymous denunciation to the authorities accused Botticelli of sodomy.

== Subject ==
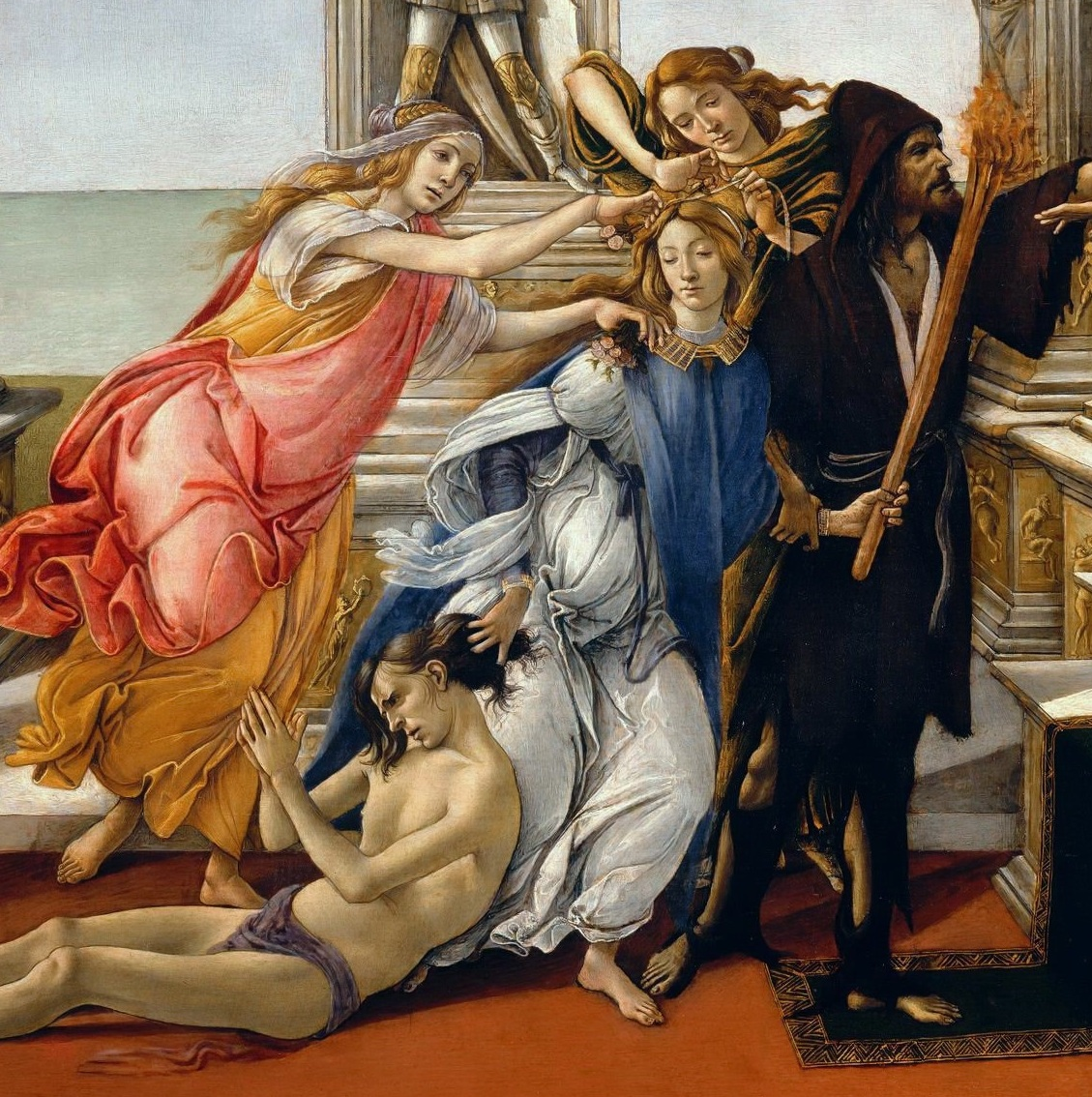
Perfidy, the victim, Calumny, Fraud and Rancour

The figures are either personifications of vices or virtues, or in the case of the king and victim, of the roles of the powerful and the powerless. From left to right, they represent (with alternative names): Truth, nude and pointing upwards to Heaven; Repentance in black; Perfidy (Conspiracy) in red and yellow, over the innocent half-naked victim on the floor, who is being pulled forward by the hair by Calumny (Slander), in white and blue and holding a flaming torch. Fraud, behind, arranges Calumny's hair. Rancour (Envy), a bearded and hooded man in black, holds his hand towards the king's eyes to obscure their view. On the throne, the king has the donkey's ears of King Midas, and Ignorance on his far side and Suspicion on the near side grasp these as they speak into them. The king extends his hand towards Calumny, but his eyes look down so that he cannot see the scene.

These identifications are clear from Lucian's description of a painting by Apelles, a Greek painter of the Hellenistic Period. Though Apelles' works have not survived, Lucian recorded details of one in his On Calumny:

On the right of it sits Midas with very large ears, extending his hand to Slander while she is still at some distance from him. Near him, on one side, stand two women—Ignorance and Suspicion. On the other side, Slander is coming up, a woman beautiful beyond measure, but full of malignant passion and excitement, evincing as she does fury and wrath by carrying in her left hand a blazing torch and with the other dragging by the hair a young man who stretches out his hands to heaven and calls the gods to witness his innocence. She is conducted by a pale ugly man who has a piercing eye and looks as if he had wasted away in long illness; he represents envy. There are two women in attendance to Slander, one is Fraud and the other Conspiracy. They are followed by a woman dressed in deep mourning, with black clothes all in tatters—she is Repentance. At all events, she is turning back with tears in her eyes and casting a stealthy glance, full of shame, at Truth, who is slowly approaching.

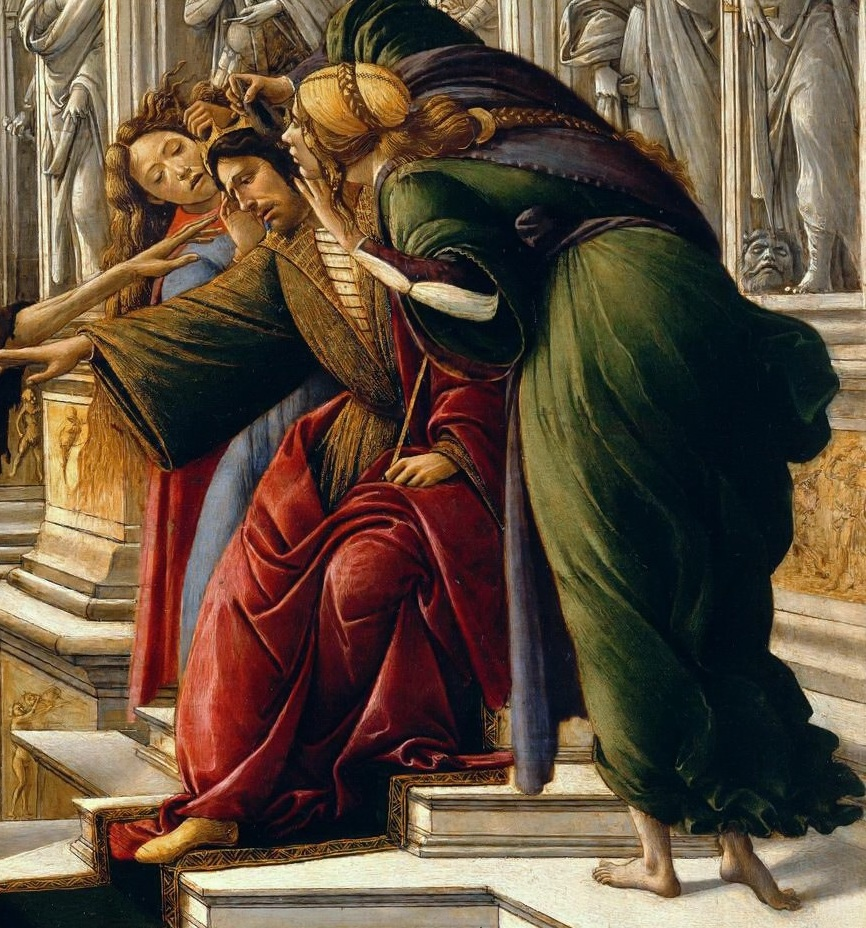
Ignorance and Suspicion on either side of the King

Botticelli reproduced this quite closely, down to the donkey ears of the seated king, into which the women that flank him speak. A richly gowned Slander (or Calumny), with her hair being dressed by her attendants, is being led by her slender, robed companion. The victim she is dragging, nearly nude and with his ankles crossed as if to be crucified, raises his hands in prayer.

According to Lucian, the painting was made after Apelles had himself been slandered, denounced to Ptolemy IV Philopator of Egypt by Antiphilos, a rival artist, of conspiring in around 219 BC with Theodotus of Aetolia to hand Syrian cities such as Tyre to the rival Seleucids. Ptolemy was on the verge of executing Apelles, when one of the rebel prisoners confirmed Apelles was innocent and the slanderer himself was given to Apelles as a slave, along with gold. Apelles then expressed his resentment of the peril in which he found himself in his painting. A difficulty with Lucian's story is that, although Apelles' dates are far from certain, he is usually regarded as a contemporary of Alexander the Great, active about a century before the conspiracy. Lucian lived about five centuries after Alexander's time.

=== Borrowings and style ===
Ronald Lightbown considers the painting may have originally been intended for Botticelli's own pleasure and use, as the Mystic Nativity seems to have been. Without any description of the setting in Lucian or Alberti, Botticelli has imagined a throne room very elaborately decorated with sculptures and reliefs of classical heroes, creatures from ancient myth, and battle scenes. The extensive reliefs around the room contain some quotations from earlier paintings of his, including the spalliere paintings of the story of Nastalgio degli Onesti, and his Return of Judith to Betulia. The figure of "Truth" is clearly derived from the Venus of his Birth of Venus. The Saint George-like statue in a niche above the central group seems to be from a fresco by Andrea del Castagno.

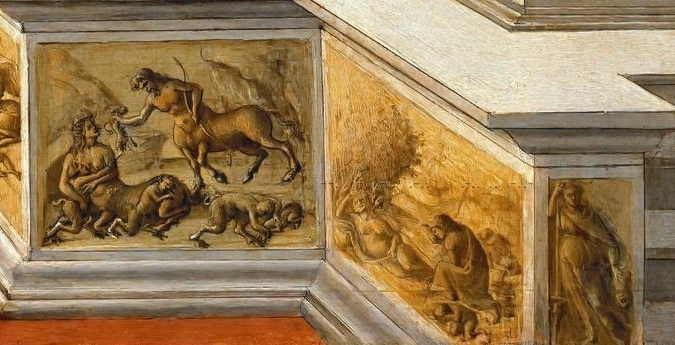
Detail below the throne: a centaur family

Other scenes probably derive from ancient engraved gems, and one recreates another of Lucian's descriptions, of a family of centaurs by Zeuxis (below the throne). In general, though many of the subjects of the decorative sculpture are classical, the style of their depiction, especially in the statues, is firmly from Botticelli's own period. The palace is beside the sea, which can be seen, flat and plain, through the windows; as often, Botticelli has little interest in enlivening his depiction of landscape with detail. The living figures contrast in style with the statues, and are all thin and elongated in a rather mannered way.

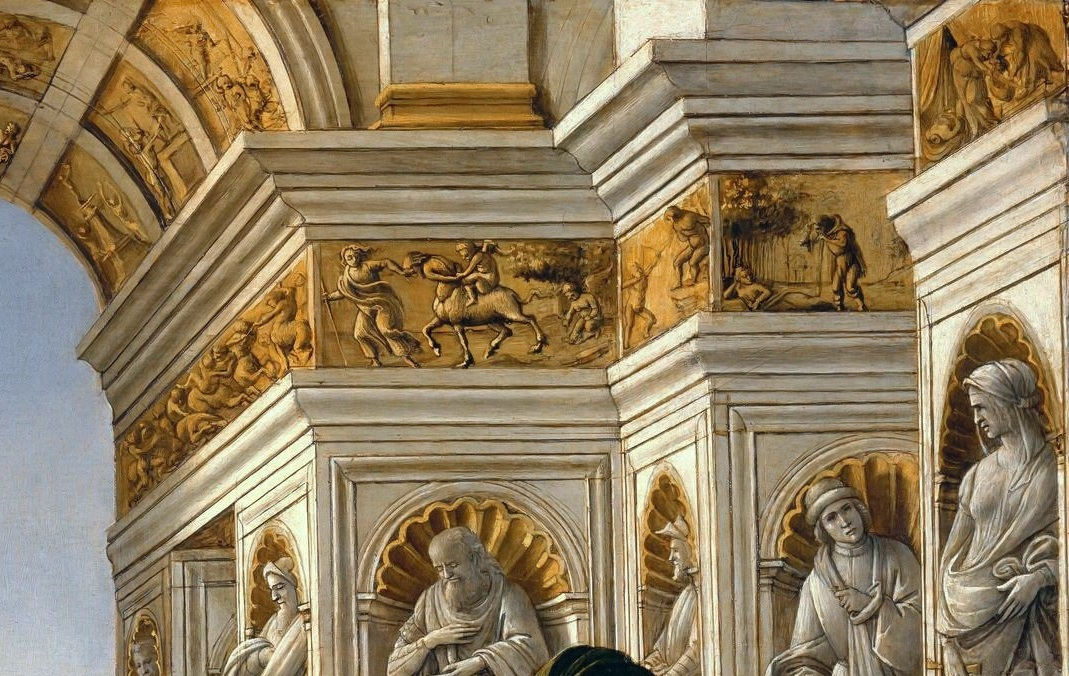
Detail, above the throne

According to Frederick Hartt, "some of the oppressive effect of the Calumny is produced by its illogical space". Most of the architecture has a more or less consistent vanishing point, around the head of Fraud, but the central cornice and vaults use one a good deal lower. The movement of the narrative action across the picture space conflicts with the strong pull of the perspective to the back of the picture space.

== History ==
Some decades later Giorgio Vasari saw the painting in the collection of the son of Antonio Segna Guidi (c. 1460–1512), a Florentine banker whose period from 1497 overseeing the Papal Mint ended unhappily, on the rack. Vasari says that the painting had been a gift from Botticelli, so if he had intended the painting for himself, he apparently changed his mind some time later.

Frederick Hartt notes the temptation to see the painting as a defence of Savonarola against his enemies, especially as the black robe with white underneath of Penitence can be seen as that of the friar's Dominican order. Savonarola was excommunicated on 12 May 1497, but continued to preach until the Florentine government pressured him to stop, ceasing on 18 March 1498. He was finally executed on 23 May 1498. Hartt notes "...no one seems to think the painting can be as late as 1497 or 1498. Why not?"

It was later in the Medici collection in the Pitti Palace, and by 1773 in the Uffizi.

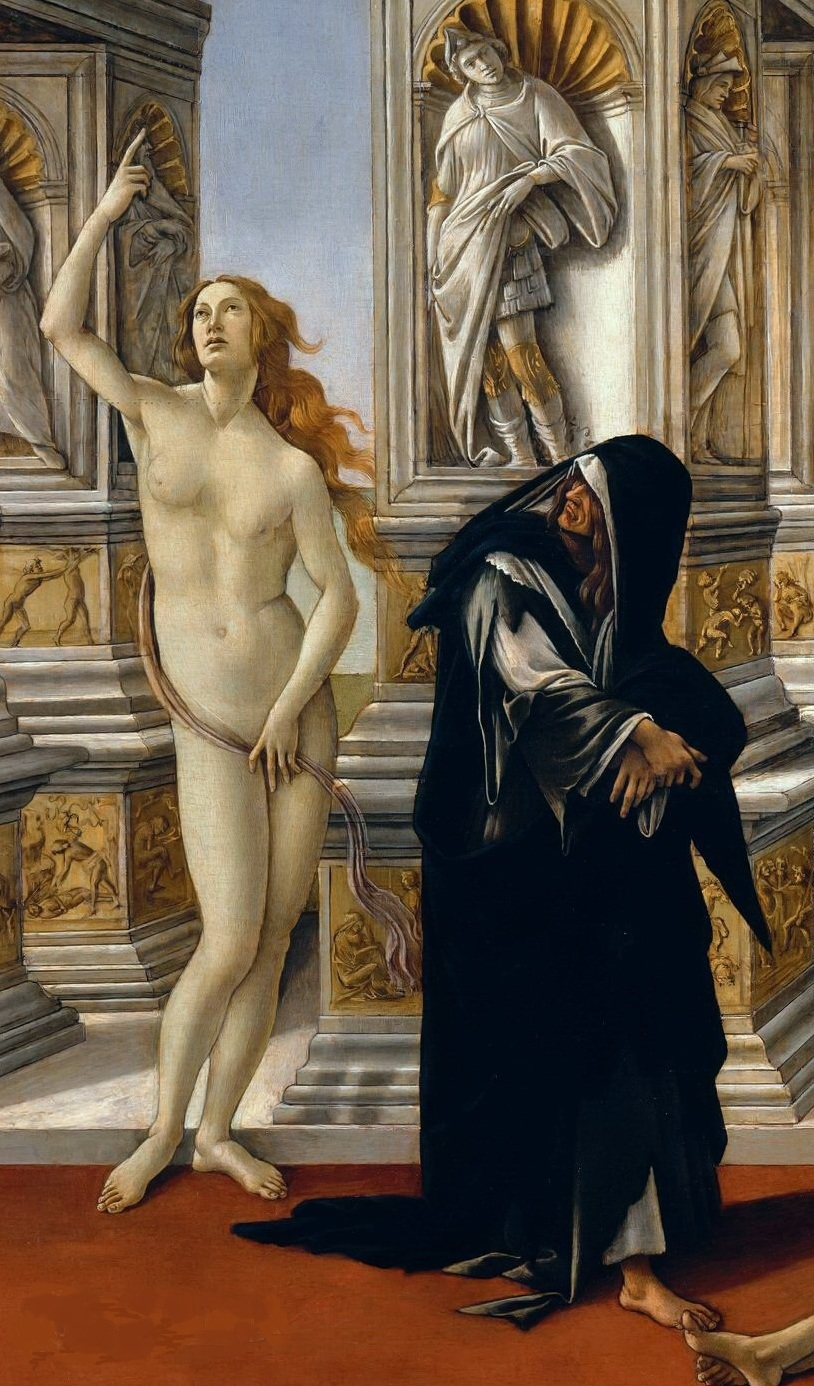
Truth and Repentance

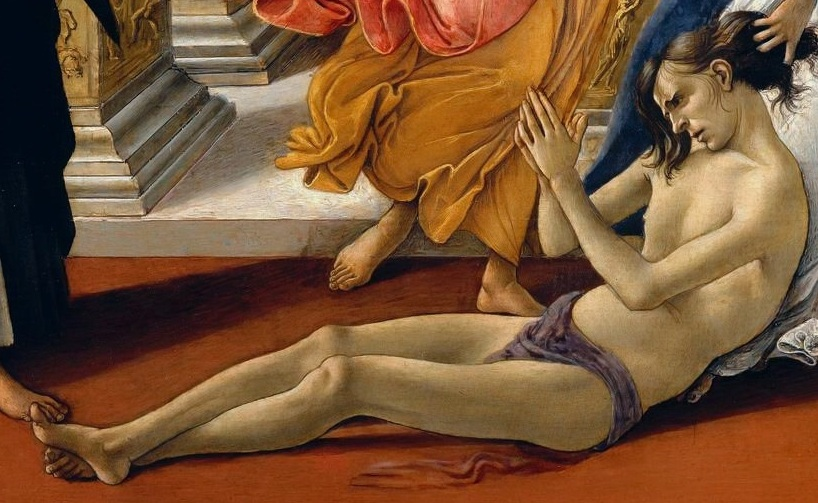
The victim

== See also ==
- List of works by Sandro Botticelli
