= Pallas and the Centaur =

Painting by Sandro Botticelli

- Artist: Sandro Botticelli
- Year: c. 1482
- Medium: Tempera on canvas
- Dimensions: 204 cm × 147.5 cm (80 in × 58.1 in)
- Location: Uffizi; Florence

Pallas and the Centaur is a painting by the Italian Renaissance painter Sandro Botticelli, c. 1482. It is now in the Uffizi Gallery in Florence. It has been proposed as a companion piece to his Primavera, though it is a different shape. The medium used is tempera paints on canvas and its size is 207 x 148 cm. The painting has been retouched in many places, and these retouchings have faded.

The life-size figures are from classical mythology and probably form an allegory. There is a centaur on the left, and a female figure holding a very elaborate halberd on the right. (Note: The ceremonial halberd, especially in such large and elaborate form, was a weapon carried by guards rather than on the battlefield.) She is clutching the hair of the centaur, who was evidently about to shoot from his bow. The female figure was called Camilla in the earliest record of the painting, an inventory of 1499, but in an inventory of 1516 she is called Minerva, the Roman equivalent of Pallas Athene; Pallas remains her usual modern identification, but Camilla has supporters. Arthur Frothingham suggested that she is Florencia, the personification of the city of Florence. The fine cloth of her dress is decorated with the Medici's three-ring insignia. (Note: Additionally, her upper body is adorned by leaves resembling olive or laurel, the latter species often referring to the Medici.)

A figure specifically originating from Roman mythology, (Note: Camilla may have been invented by Virgil for the Aeneid.) Camilla was a princess raised in the forest by her father, the exiled King Metabus, to be dedicated to Diana as a virgin warrior huntress, for whom subduing a centaur might be considered ordinary. Pallas/Minerva, by contrast, is a major deity, representing wisdom, trade, and more. Centaurs are associated with uncontrolled passion, lust and sensuality. The painting's meaning is clearly at least in part about the submission of passion to chastity and/or reason. Various more specific personal, political and philosophical meanings along these general lines have been proposed.

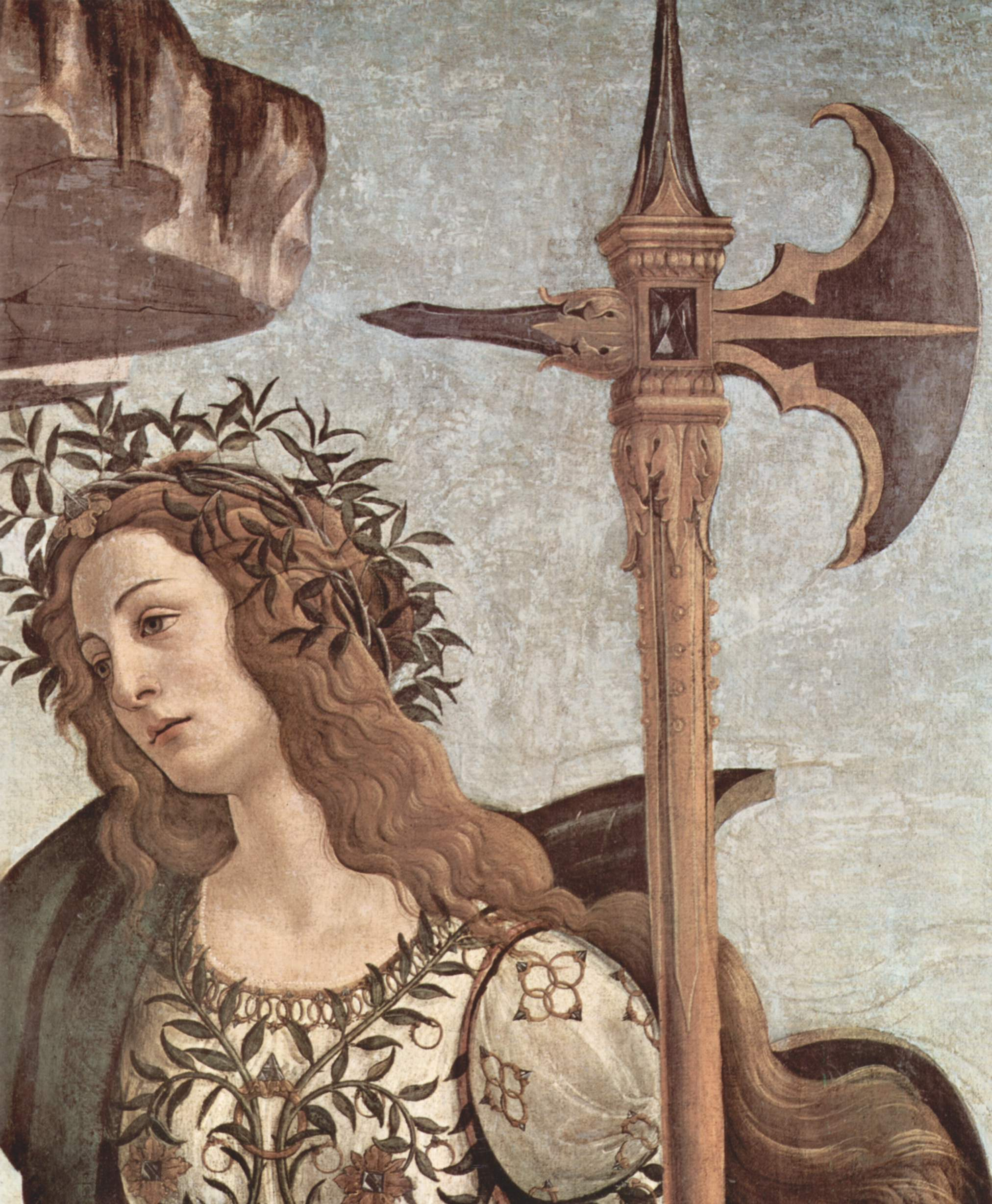
Detail of Pallas's halberd and face

== History ==
The painting is usually dated to about 1482 or 1483 on stylistic grounds, soon after Botticelli's return from Rome, where he had been part of the project to paint the Sistine Chapel. The features of the centaur are close to those of Moses in one of his frescos there. The painting is often connected with the wedding in 1482 of Lorenzo di Pierfrancesco de' Medici to Semiramide Appiano, perhaps as a wedding gift from Lorenzo de' Medici ("Lorenzo il Magnifico").

Given the Medici device on Pallas' dress, it was presumably commissioned by the Medici family, as were many of Botticelli’s paintings, and has passed to the Uffizi with much of their collection. In 1499 an inventory lists it in the same room as Botticelli's Primavera, in the town palace in Florence of Lorenzo di Pierfrancesco de' Medici and his brother Giovanni "Il Popolano". They were the cousins of Lorenzo de' Medici, de facto ruler of Florence, and after their father's early death had been his wards. In the later 16th century it hung in the Palazzo Vecchio. In 1638 it was at the Medici Villa di Castello, as was the Primavera, then it is recorded in the Pitti Palace by about 1830, by which time Botticelli was unfashionable and regarded as mainly of historical interest.

The painting was then little-known until it was noticed in 1895 in one of the ante-rooms of the Palazzo Pitti by the English artist, living in Florence, William Blundell Spence. The painting was in the Uffizi gallery from 1922. It has perhaps been transferred from panel to canvas.

In 2015, this painting among other Botticelli paintings was in an exhibition that opened in Berlin before moving to London. It showed Botticelli’s works and other artists’ versions of his paintings such as his The Birth of Venus.

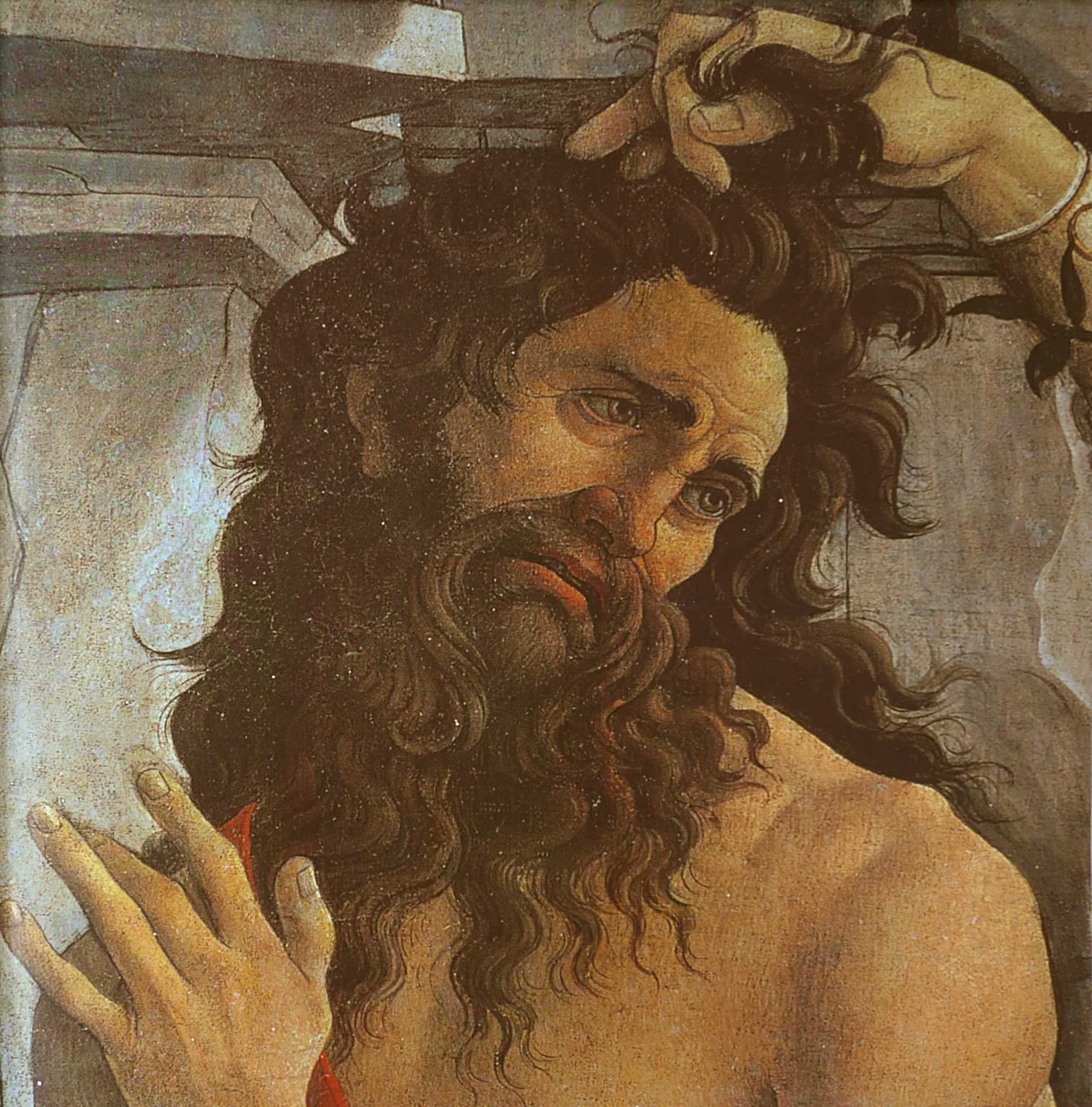
Detail of the centaur's expression

Linda Proud has written an eponymous novel which centres on an account of Botticelli's creation of this painting, and its possible interpretations.

== Interpretations ==
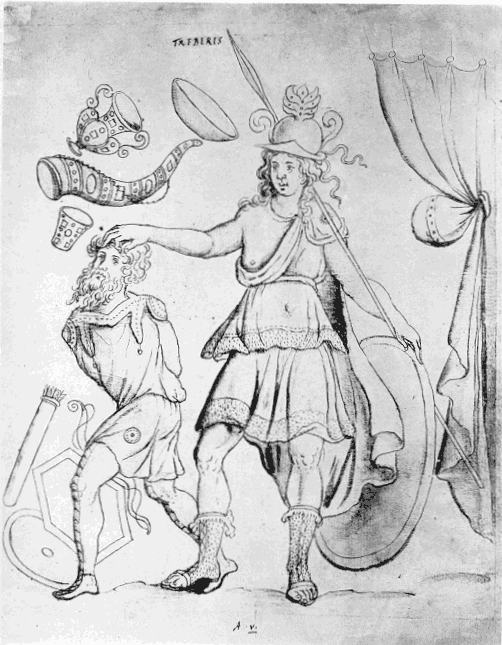
Personification of Trier from the Chronography of 354

If given by Lorenzo de' Medici for his cousin's wedding, the two figures may represent the couple, aside from any other interpretations. The lands of the bride's father, lord of Piombino on the Ligurian coast, and the island of Elba just off it, might be considered as part of Camilla's hunting grounds. The Italian for the balls in the Medici coat of arms is palle, and their supporters were sometimes called palleschi, which adds to the plausibility of political interpretations. Additionally, Pallas wears either olive branches (the tree of Pallas) or laurel sprays, entwined around her head, arms, breasts, and hips, held together by diamant rings similar to those forming the Medici sign; laurel was often used as a reference to the Medici and more specifically as a pun alluding to Lorenzo de' Medici.

Pallas is a figure of reason, restraining the beast of our nature – also represented by the centaur – by the hair and looking at it with no fear. This has been connected with Sigmund Freud’s theory of the unconscious, and also to the Renaissance Neo-Platonist Marsilio Ficino's idea of the human soul as part animal and part human. It has been interpreted as an allegory on the peace after the Pazzi wars.

Frothingham posited that Botticelli’s idea for the painting could have come from an image in the Chronography of 354, a Roman calendar by Furius Dionysius Filocalus, the secretary to Pope Damasus I. The calendar depicts the personification of the city of Trier as a female warrior with a spear and shield holding the hair of a male figure with a bow and arrows by his feet. The male is smaller than the female and looks as if he is trying to escape her grasp. The two works are very similar and it is possible Botticelli got his idea for his painting from this image, having seen a copy.

Ronald Lightbown believes the female figure is Camilla. He notes that the halberd, while not a traditional attribute of either Pallas or Camilla, is a ceremonial weapon for guards and sentinels, and there is a wooden fence in the background, suggesting that the painting shows a guard catching the centaur on forbidden land. Furthermore, since Camilla was renowned for her chastity and centaurs were lustful creatures, most probably "the picture is a variation on the favorite quattrocento theme of chastity overcoming lust". He believes the painting may be a wedding gift for Lorenzo di Pierfrancesco and a compliment to his bride Semiramide.

John Rigby Hale interprets the work as affirming Lorenzo de' Medici's diplomatic encounter with King Ferdinand I of Naples and subsequent constitutional changes within the Florentine Republic which increased Lorenzo's power. Hale states:

Pallas Taming the Centaur—wisdom overcoming a barbarian—symbolized, for 15th Century Florence, the boldness with which their own Lorenzo de' Medici had bested his enemy, the King of Naples, and the wisdom of his peace terms.

== Drawings ==
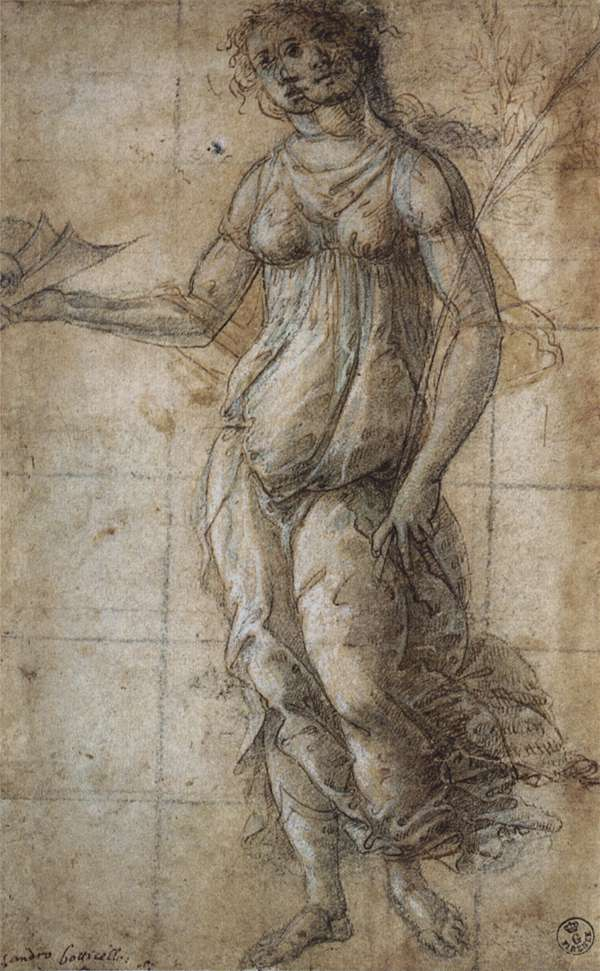
Botticelli's drawing of Pallas at the Uffizi

There are three drawings in Botticelli's style of Pallas, which may possibly be early ideas for the painting, though none are very close to the final figure, and all seem to be studies for a single standing figure. In two she carries a large olive branch and holds a helmet. They are in the Uffizi, the Ashmolean Museum in Oxford, and the Pinacoteca Ambrosiana in Milan.

== See also ==
- List of works by Sandro Botticelli

== Notes ==
Footnotes

Citations
