= Harpalykos =

Name of Greek mythological figures

In Greek mythology, the name Harpalycus (Ancient Greek: Ἁρπάλυκος) may refer to:

- Harpalycus, an Arcadian prince as one of the 50 sons of the impious King Lycaon either by the naiad Cyllene, Nonacris or by unknown woman. He and his brothers were the most nefarious and carefree of all people. To test them, Zeus visited them in the form of a peasant. These brothers mixed the entrails of a child into the god's meal, whereupon the enraged Zeus threw the meal over the table. Harpalycus was killed, along with his brothers and their father, by a lightning bolt of the god.
- Harpalycus, son of Hermes and Heracles' instructor in fencing.
- Harpalycus, king of the Amymnei in Thrace, father of Harpalyce, whom he raised as a valiant warrior and his own intended successor. He was killed by the rebellious people.
- Harpalycus, a soldier in Aeneas' army killed by Camilla.
- Harpalicus, one of the dogs that tore apart Actaeon
