= Echion (painter) =

Echion (Ancient Greek: Έχίων), also known as Aetion (Ἀετίων), was a celebrated Greek painter in the latter half of the fourth century B.C. spoken of by Lucian, who gives a description of one of his pictures, representing the marriage of Alexander the Great and Roxana. This painting excited such admiration when exhibited at the ancient Olympic Games, that Proxenidas, one of the judges, gave the artist his daughter in marriage.

Echion seems to have excelled particularly in the art of mixing and laying on his colors. It has commonly been supposed that he lived in the time of Alexander the Great; but the words of Lucian show clearly that he must have lived about the time of Hadrian and the Antonines.

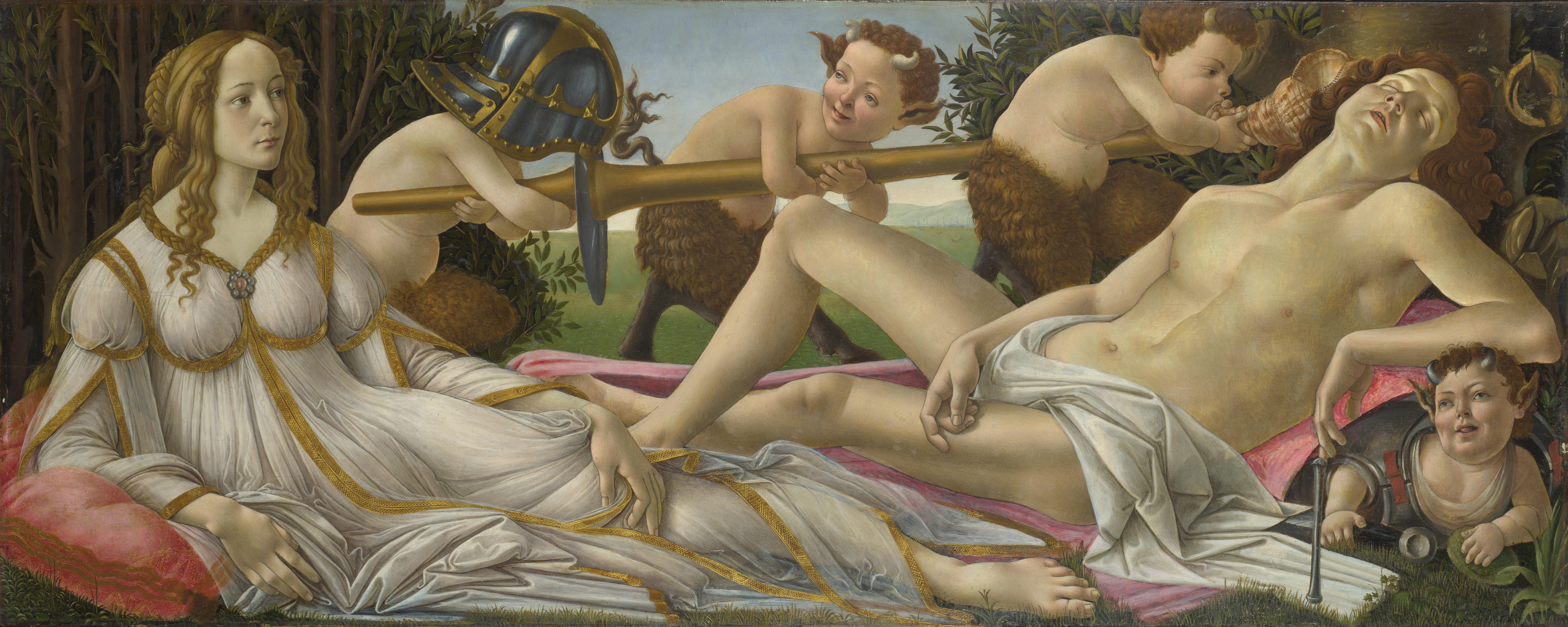
Mars and Venus by Sandro Botticelli, c 1485. Tempera and oil on poplar panel, 69 cm x 173 cm.

Aloys Hirt supposes that the name of the painter of Alexander's marriage, whom Lucian praises so highly, as Aetion, is a corruption of Echion.

Sandro Botticelli drew on Lucian's ekphrasis in his Mars and Venus (c. 1485, now National Gallery), borrowing the amoretti playing with Alexander's armour during the ceremony, two carrying his lance and one who has crawled inside his breastplate.

== See also ==
- List of ancient Greeks
- List of painters
