= Richard Laqueur =

German historian and philologist (1881–1959)

Richard Laqueur (27 March 1881 – 25 November 1959) was a German historian and philologist born.

== Biography ==
Born 27 March 1881, in Strasbourg, he studied classical literature and history at the Universities of Bonn and Strassburg, and in 1904 received his doctorate of philosophy. In 1912 he was made a full professor at Strassburg, and during the same year was appointed professor at the University of Giessen. From 1914 to 1918, he performed military duties during World War I, and in 1919 returned to Giessen, where he remained until 1930. Laqueur was rector at the university in 1922/23.

In 1930, he became a professor at the University of Tübingen, and two years later a professor at the University of Halle. Because he was Jewish, Laqueur was removed from his position at Halle in 1936, and in 1939 emigrated to the United States. After World War II, he returned to Germany, but was denied his former status at Halle due to bureaucratic obstacles. In 1952, he moved to Hamburg, where he was later granted an honorary professorship.

Laqueur was a specialist of ancient Greek and Roman history, and was particularly interested in the economic history of their civilizations. He conducted extensive research of the ancient historians Polybius and Flavius Josephus, and made literary contributions to the Pauly-Wissowa- Realencyclopädie der Classischen Altertumswissenschaft.

== Selected works ==
- Quaestiones epigraphicae et papyrologicae selectae, 1904.
- Kritische Untersuchungen zum zweiten Makkabäerbuch, 1904 – Critical investigations on the Second Book of Maccabees.
- Polybius, 1912 – On Polybius.
- Der jüdische Historiker Flavius Josephus; ein biographischer Versuch auf neuer quellenkritischer Grundlage, 1920 – The Jewish historian Flavius Josephus.
- Epigraphische Untersuchungen zu den griechischen Volksbeschlüssen, 1927.
- Eusebius als Historiker seiner Zeit, 1929 – Eusebius as a historian of his time.
- Probleme der Spätantike, (with Herbert Koch and Wilhelm Weber, 1930) – Problems of Late Antiquity.
