= Harpalyce (daughter of Harpalycus) =

Thracian princess in Greek mythology

In Greek and Roman mythology, Harpalyce (/hɑːrˈpæləsiː/; Ancient Greek: Ἁρπαλύκη, romanized: Harpalúkē) is a Thracian princess, the daughter of Harpalycus, king of the Amymnei tribe. Harpalyce was trained to be an excellent warrior and made heir to the Amymnian kingdom, but after her father's death she took to the woods and the plundering of oxen from local herdsmen.

== Mythology ==
Harpalyce was born to Harpalycus and his unnamed wife, who died when she was very young, so Harpalycus made her suckle from cows and mares. Having no other children, Harpalycus made her his heir to the kingdom and trained her in the art of war, and she grew to be a great warrior. When Neoptolemus and his Myrmidons, returning from Troy, attacked and severely wounded Harpalycus, Harpalyce came to the defence of her father and forced Neoptolemus to flee. In another version, it was the Getae who attacked Thrace.

Harpalycus was eventually killed during an insurrection of his people the Amymnei because of his cruelty, and Harpalyce took his death so hard she withdrew to the woods to become a robber, abandoning her kingdom and the throne. She made a habit of plundering the local herds of cattle, and afterward evading capture due to her unusual speed, for she could outrun horses and even the swift current of the Hebrus river. Eventually the herdsmen who owned the livestock attacked her and in the ensuing fight, killed her, or alternatively caught her in a snare and then killed her.

A bloody brawl was caused by her death which caused several to die as the herdmen fought violently over a small child Harpalyce had had with her at the time, booty from a past robbing. Harpalyce received cult honours which took the form of mock battles at the site of her tomb.

== Legacy ==
The Roman poet Virgil is the earliest (surviving) source of Harpalyce's tale, and he seems to have used her as his inspiration for the portrayal of Camilla, a wild huntress and adversary to Aeneas in the Aeneid, a first-century BC Latin epic poem.

== See also ==
- Castor and Pollux, who died after a failed cattle theft
- Atalanta, hunter raised by animals

== Bibliography ==
- Bell, Robert E. (1991). Women of Classical Mythology: A Biographical Dictionary. ABC-Clio. ISBN 9780874365818.
- Grimal, Pierre (1987). The Dictionary of Classical Mythology. Wiley-Blackwell. ISBN 0-631-13209-0.
- Hyginus, Fabulae from The Myths of Hyginus translated and edited by Mary Grant. University of Kansas Publications in Humanistic Studies. Online version at the Topos Text Project.
- March, Jennifer R. (May 31, 2014). Dictionary of Classical Mythology. Oxbow Books. ISBN 978-1-78297-635-6.
- Maurus Servius Honoratus, In Vergilii Carmina Comentarii. Servii Grammatici qui feruntur in Vergilii carmina commentarii; recensuerunt Georgius Thilo et Hermannus Hagen. Georgius Thilo. Leipzig. B. G. Teubner. 1881. Online version at the Perseus Digital Library.
- Smith, William (1873). A Dictionary of Greek and Roman Biography and Mythology. London, UK: John Murray, printed by Spottiswoode and Co. Online version at the Perseus.tufts library.
- Vergil, the Aeneid, with an English translation by Theodore C. Williams. Boston, Houghton Mifflin Co: 1910. Online text available at the Perseus Digital Library
