= Metabus (spider) =

Scientific classification
- Kingdom: Animalia
- Phylum: Arthropoda
- Subphylum: Chelicerata
- Class: Arachnida
- Order: Araneae
- Infraorder: Araneomorphae
- Family: Tetragnathidae
- Genus: Metabus; O. Pickard-Cambridge, 1899

Type species
- M. ocellatus (Keyserling, 1864)

Species
- 4, see text

Synonyms
- Metargyra F. O. Pickard-Cambridge, 1903

Genus of spiders

Metabus is a genus of long-jawed orb-weavers that was first described by Octavius Pickard-Cambridge in 1899.

== Species ==
As of October 2019 it contains four species, found in Ecuador, Mexico, the Dominican Republic, Guatemala, and French Guiana:

- Metabus conacyt Álvarez-Padilla, 2007 – Mexico, Guatemala
- Metabus debilis (O. Pickard-Cambridge, 1889) – Mexico to Ecuador
- Metabus ebanoverde Álvarez-Padilla, 2007 – Guatemala, Dominican Rep.
- Metabus ocellatus (Keyserling, 1864) (type) – Mexico to French Guiana

In synonymy:

- M. gravidus O. Pickard-Cambridge, 1899 = Metabus ocellatus (Keyserling, 1864)
