= Venulus =

Venulus was an ambassador sent by Turnus of Ardea to the Greek hero Diomedes to request assistance in a war against Aeneas. He appears as a character in Vergil's Aeneid (in Books 8 and 11, where he was killed by Tarchon) and Ovid's Metamorphoses (Book 14); in both epics, he seems to serve as a proxy or counterpart of the goddess Venus (Paschalis 288, Barchiesi 119), whose name is incorporated in his own. There is no evidence for his existence beyond (or prior to) the Aeneid and Metamorphoses.
