= Metabus =

King in Roman mythology

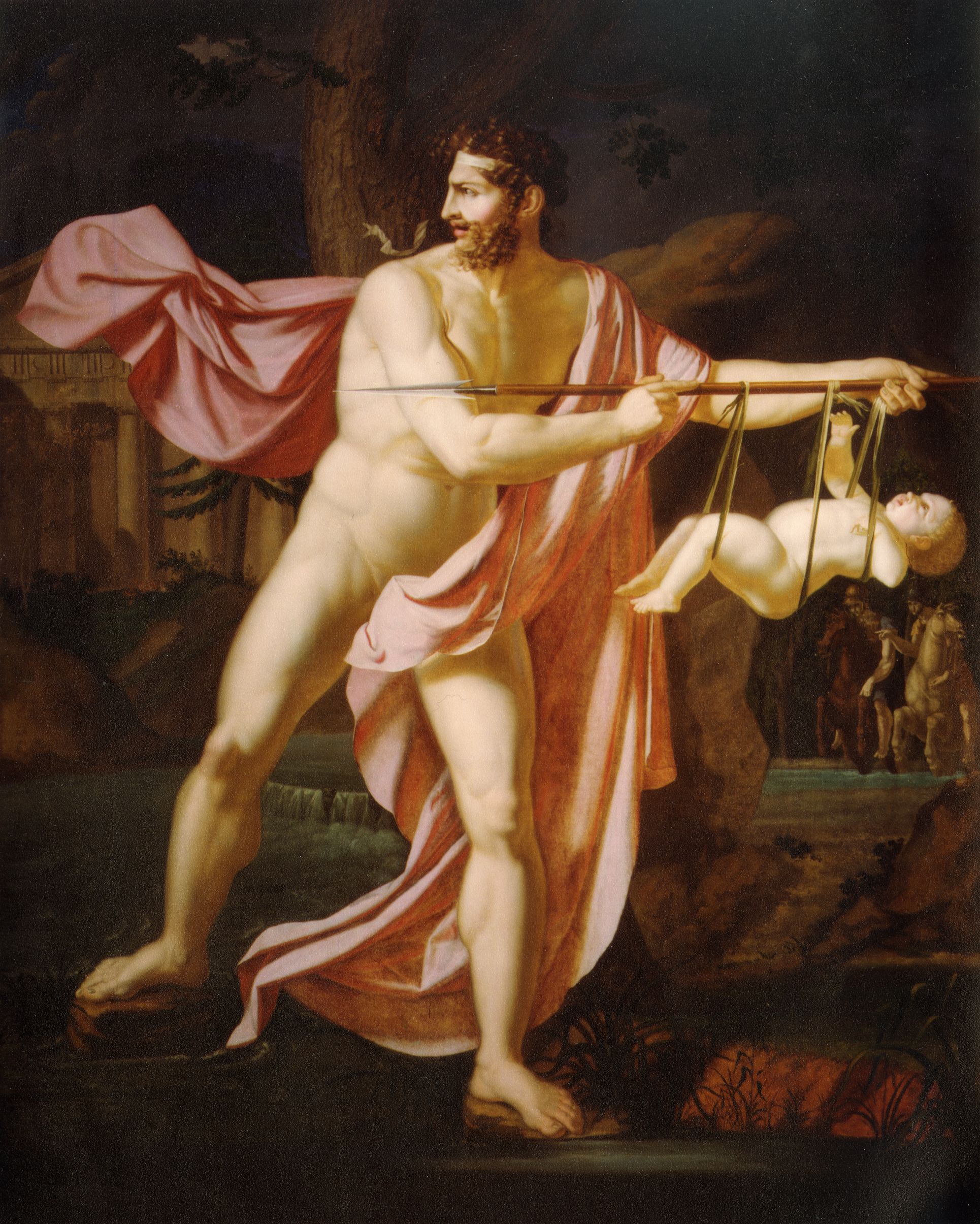
Metabus and Camilla by Jean-Baptiste Peytavin (1808)

In Roman mythology, King Metabus of the Volsci was the father of Camilla.

Driven from his throne, Metabus and his infant daughter Camilla were chased into the wilderness by armed Volsci. When the river Amasenus blocked his path, he bound her to a spear and promised Diana that Camilla would be her servant if she would safely transport her to the opposite bank. He then safely threw her to the other side, and swam across to retrieve her. The story is told by Virgil in Book XI of the Aeneid.
