= Leopold Ettlinger =

Art historian in England and US

Leopold David Ettlinger (April 20, 1913 – July 4, 1989) was a Warburg Institute historian of the Italian Renaissance and UC Berkeley Art Department Chair, from 1970 to 1980. He wrote some of his books together with his third wife Helen Shahrokh Ettlinger.

He was born in Germany and came to England in 1938 as a refugee from the Nazi regime. When briefly interned on the Isle of Man he got to know other art historians from the Warburg Institute, which he joined in 1948, staying until 1964. From 1964 he was Durning-Lawrence Professor of the History of Art at London University (replacing Ernst Gombrich). In 1970 he moved to the US and Berkeley. He also taught at the University of Reading in England, and Yale.

Helen Ettlinger was born in California and studied at Berkeley. They later divorced.

== Publications ==
- 'The Arts in Western Europe: Northern Europe', in New Cambridge Modern History, vol. 1 The Renaissance 1493–1520, Cambridge University Press, 1957.
- The Sistine Chapel before Michelangelo: Religious Imagery and Papal Primacy, Clarendon Press, 1965.
- Botticelli, (with Helen S. Ettlinger), Thames and Hudson (World of Art), 1976.
- Antonio and Piero Pollaiuolo: Complete Edition with a Critical Catalogue, Phaidon, 1978.
