= Ronald Lightbown =

British art historian and curator (1932–2021)

Ronald Lightbown (1932–2021) was a noted British art historian and curator, specializing in Renaissance art. He wrote large monographs on the painters Sandro Botticelli and Carlo Crivelli. After a degree from the University of Cambridge, between 1958 and his retirement in 1989 he worked at the Victoria and Albert Museum in London, rising to be the Keeper of its library and then as Keeper of Metalwork. Before John Pope-Hennessy became the museum's director in 1967 (until 1973) they co-wrote the Catalogue of Italian Sculpture in the Victoria and Albert Museum comprising three volumes (1964). His monographs on the partnership of Donatello and Michelozzo, and on Botticelli became seminal works for their subject.

== Selected publications ==
- Catalogue of Scandinavian and Baltic silver. London : The Museum, 1975 (Victoria and Albert Museum catalogue).
- French silver. London : H.M.S.O., 1978 (Victoria and Albert Museum catalogue).
- Secular goldsmiths' work in medieval France : a history . London : Society of Antiquaries of London, 1978.
- Sandro Botticelli (2 vols.). Berkeley: University of California Press, 1978.
- Sandro Botticelli: Life and Work. New York: Abbeville Press, 1989. ISBN 0-89659-931-0.
- Donatello and Michelozzo: An Artistic Partnership and Its Patrons in the Early Renaissance. London: H. Miller, 1980.
- Piero della Francesca. New York: Abbeville Press, 1992. ISBN 978-1558591684.
- Carlo Crivelli. New Haven, Connecticut: Yale University Press, 2004.
