= Simonetta Vespucci =

Italian noblewoman (1453–1476)

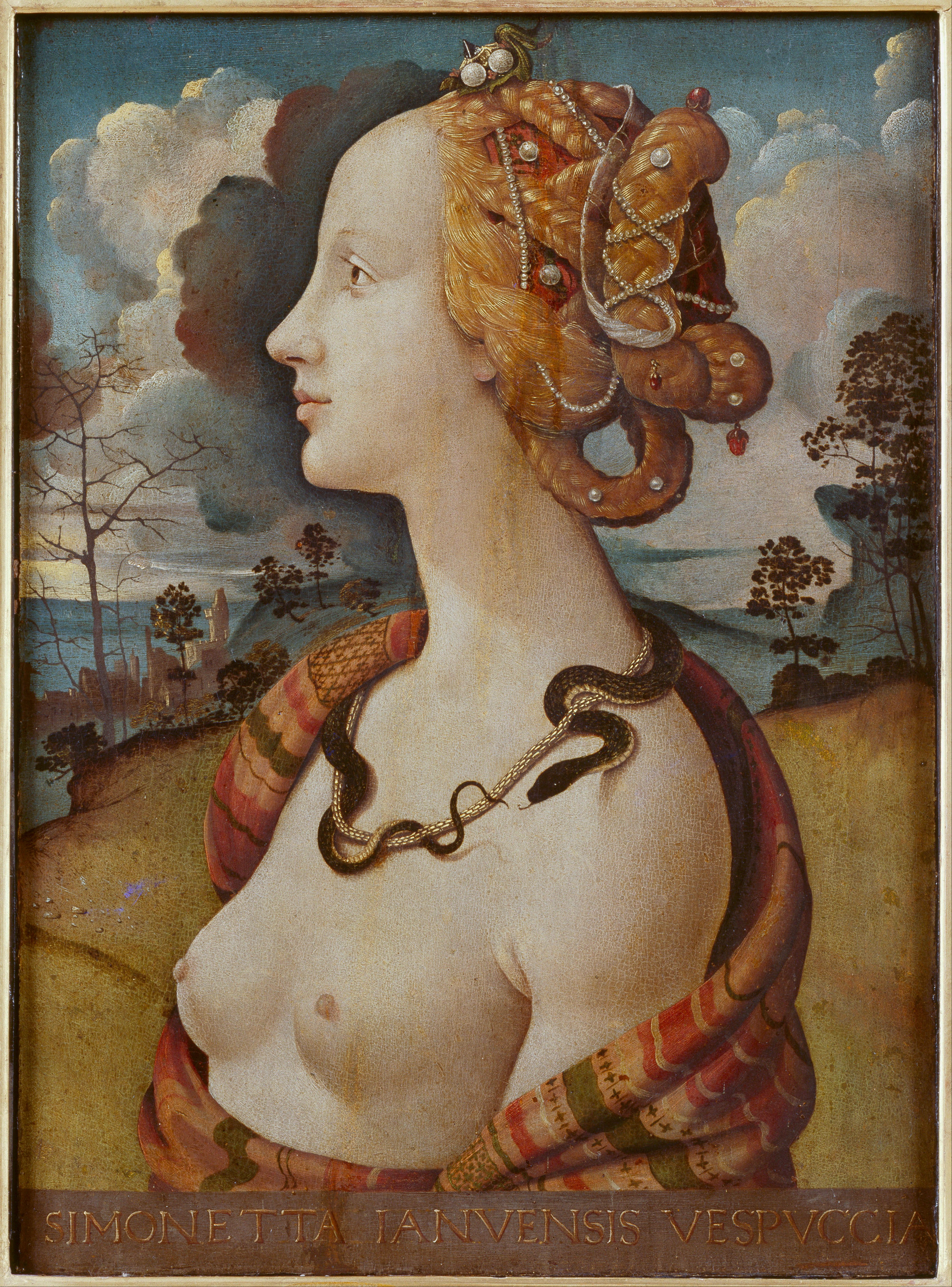
- Portrait of a woman, said to be of Vespucci (c. 1490), by Piero di Cosimo
- Born: Simonetta Cattaneo c. 1453; Genoa or Portovenere, Republic of Genoa
- Died: 26 April 1476 (aged 22–23); Florence, Republic of Florence
- Spouse: Marco Vespucci (m. 1469)
- Parents: Gaspare Cattaneo della Volta (father); Caterina Violante "Cattocchia" Spinola (mother)
- Relatives: Amerigo Vespucci (cousin-in-law)

Simonetta Vespucci (née Cattaneo; c. 1453 – 26 April 1476), nicknamed la bella Simonetta ("the fair Simonetta"), was an Italian noblewoman from Genoa, the wife of Marco Vespucci of Florence and the cousin-in-law of Amerigo Vespucci. She was known as the greatest beauty of her age in Italy, and was allegedly the model for many paintings by Sandro Botticelli, Piero di Cosimo, and other Florentine painters. Some art historians have taken issue with these attributions, which the Victorian critic John Ruskin has been blamed for promulgating.

== Biography ==
=== Early life and marriage ===
Simonetta Cattaneo was born around 1453 in a part of the Republic of Genoa that is now in the Italian region of Liguria. A more precise location for her birthplace is unknown: possibly the city of Genoa, or perhaps either Portovenere or Fezzano (nowadays included in the municipality of Portovenere). The Florentine poet Politian wrote that her home was "in that stern Ligurian district up above the seacoast, where angry Neptune beats against the rocks ... There, like Venus, she was born among the waves." Her father was a Genoese nobleman named Gaspare Cattaneo della Volta (belonging to the same family of 16th-century Doge of Genoa Leonardo Cattaneo della Volta) and her mother was his wife, Caterina "Catocchia" Violante Spinola; another source names her parents slightly differently, as Gaspare Cattaneo and Chateroccia di Marco Spinola.

At age sixteen, she married Marco Vespucci, son of Piero, who was a distant cousin of the explorer and cartographer Amerigo Vespucci. They met in April 1469, when she was with her parents at the church of San Torpete in Genoa; the doge Piero il Fregoso and much of the Genoese nobility were present. Marco had been sent to Genoa by his father, Piero, to study at the Banco di San Giorgio. Smitten with Simonetta, Marco was accepted by her parents as their daughter's prospective bridegroom; they likely felt that the marriage would be advantageous because Marco's family was well connected in Florence, especially to the Medici family.

=== Florence ===
Simonetta and Marco were married in Florence that same year. According to legend, Simonetta quickly became popular at the Florentine court and attracted the interest of the Medici brothers, Lorenzo and Giuliano. Lorenzo permitted the Vespucci wedding to be held at the palazzo in Via Larga, and held the wedding reception at their lavish Villa di Careggi. At La Giostra (a jousting tournament) in 1475, held at the Piazza Santa Croce, Giuliano entered the lists bearing a banner upon which was a picture of Simonetta as a helmeted Pallas Athene, painted by Botticelli, beneath which was the French inscription La Sans Pareille, meaning "The Unparalleled One". Giuliano won the tournament, and nominated Simonetta as "The Queen of Beauty" at that event. It is clear that Simonetta had a reputation as an exceptional beauty in Florence, but Giuliano's display should be considered within the conventions of courtly love. Simonetta was a married woman and a member of a powerful family allied to his.

=== Death ===
Simonetta Vespucci died just one year after the joust, on the night of 26–27 April 1476. She was twenty-two at the time of her death. She was carried through the city in an open coffin for all to admire, and there may have existed a posthumous cult about her in Florence. Her husband remarried soon afterwards. Giuliano de Medici was assassinated in the Pazzi conspiracy on 26 April 1478, two years to the day after Simonetta's death.

Traditionally, it was thought that her death was caused by tuberculosis. In 2019, a team of medical historians argued that the supposed portraits of Simonetta (see below) show evidence that she suffered from a pituitary adenoma secreting prolactin and growth hormone secretion; the increase in tumour volume led to her death.

== Representations ==
Among other subjects, Sandro Botticelli painted portraits of noblewomen, several of which are attributed to portraits of Simonetta, but proof is difficult to establish. It has been postulated that some of his later works also contain representations of her. He finished one of his most famous paintings, The Birth of Venus, around 1486, 10 years after Simonetta's death; some have claimed that Venus, in this painting, closely resembles her. This claim, however, is dismissed as a "romantic myth" by Ernst Gombrich, and "romantic nonsense" by historian Felipe Fernández-Armesto:

The vulgar assumption, for instance, that she was Botticelli's model for all his famous beauties seems to be based on no better grounds than the feeling that the most beautiful woman of the day ought to have modelled for the most sensitive painter.

Some art historians, including John Ruskin, suggest that Botticelli had fallen in love with Simonetta, a view supported by Botticelli's request to be buried in the Church of Ognissanti – the parish church of the Vespucci – in Florence. His wish was carried out when he died 34 years later, in 1510. However, this had been Botticelli's parish church since he was baptised there, the church contained works by him, and he was buried with his family.

Botticelli painted the standard carried by Giuliano at the joust in 1475, which carried an image of Pallas Athene that was very probably modelled on her; so he does seem to have painted her once at least, though that particular image is now lost. Botticelli's principal Medici patron, Giuliano's younger cousin Lorenzo di Pierfrancesco de' Medici, married Simonetta's niece Semiramide in 1482, and it is likely that Botticelli's famed allegory Primavera was painted as a wedding gift for this occasion. Again, this is a work that some have claimed contains a representation of Simonetta.

== Possible depictions ==
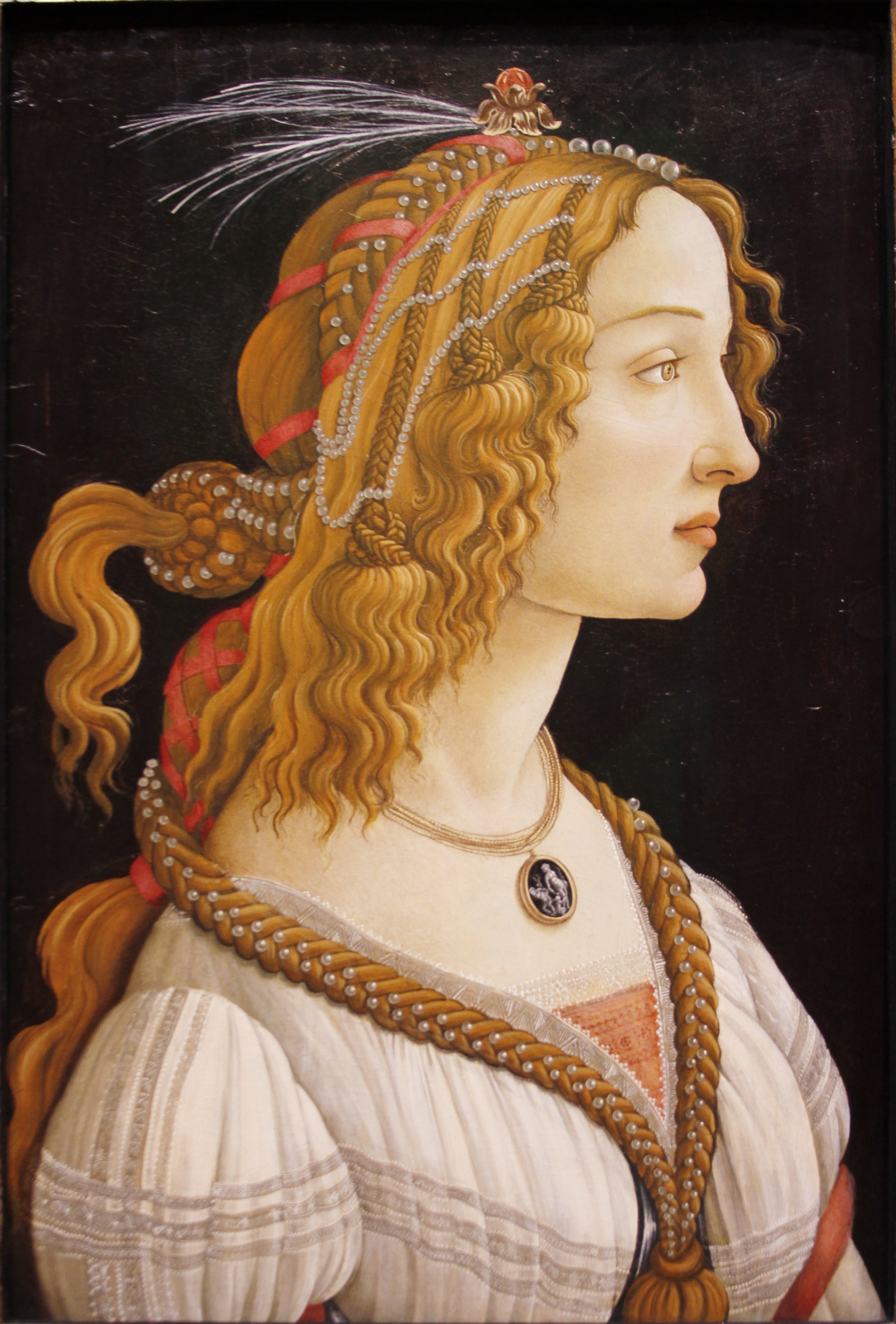
Portrait of a Woman by the workshop of Sandro Botticelli, early-mid 1480s

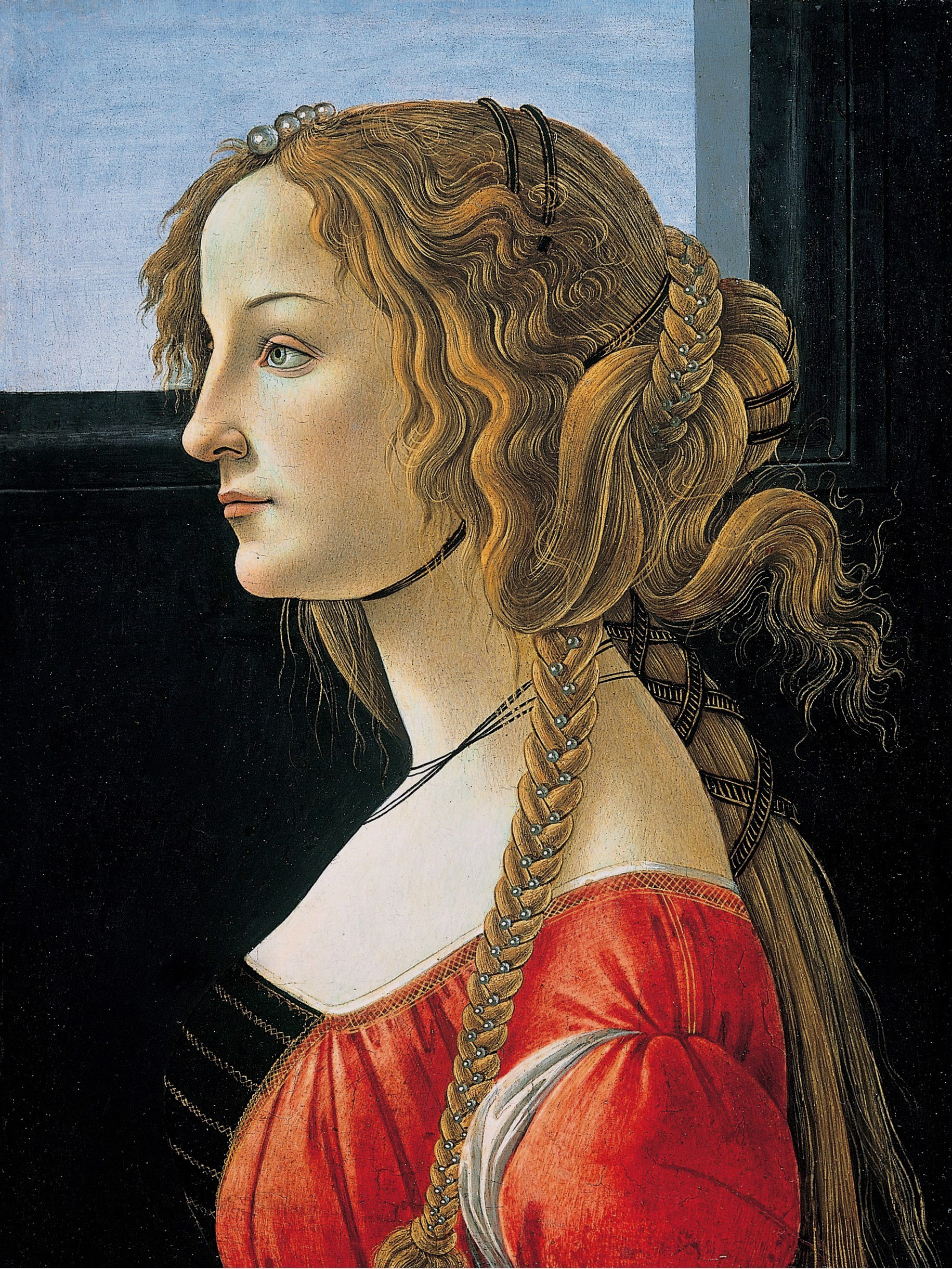
Portrait of a Woman by the workshop of Sandro Botticelli, mid-1480s

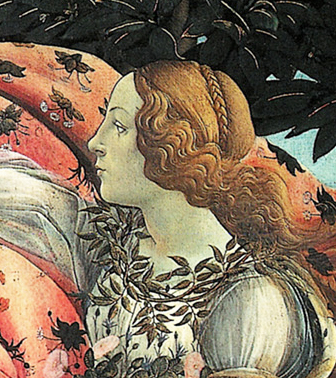
Flora in The Birth of Venus by Sandro Botticelli, circa 1484-1486

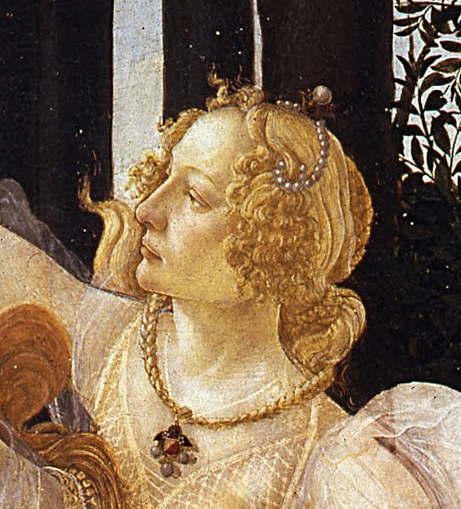
Detail of one of the Three Graces in Primavera by Sandro Botticelli, circa 1482

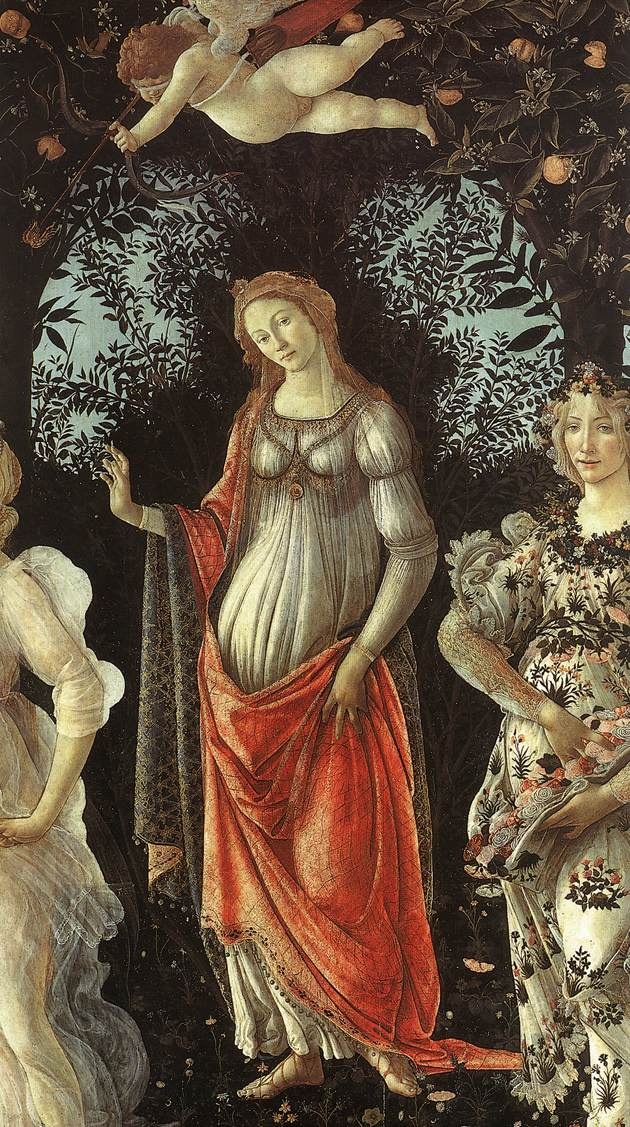
Detail of the Venus figure, representing marriage, in Primavera by Sandro Botticelli, circa 1482

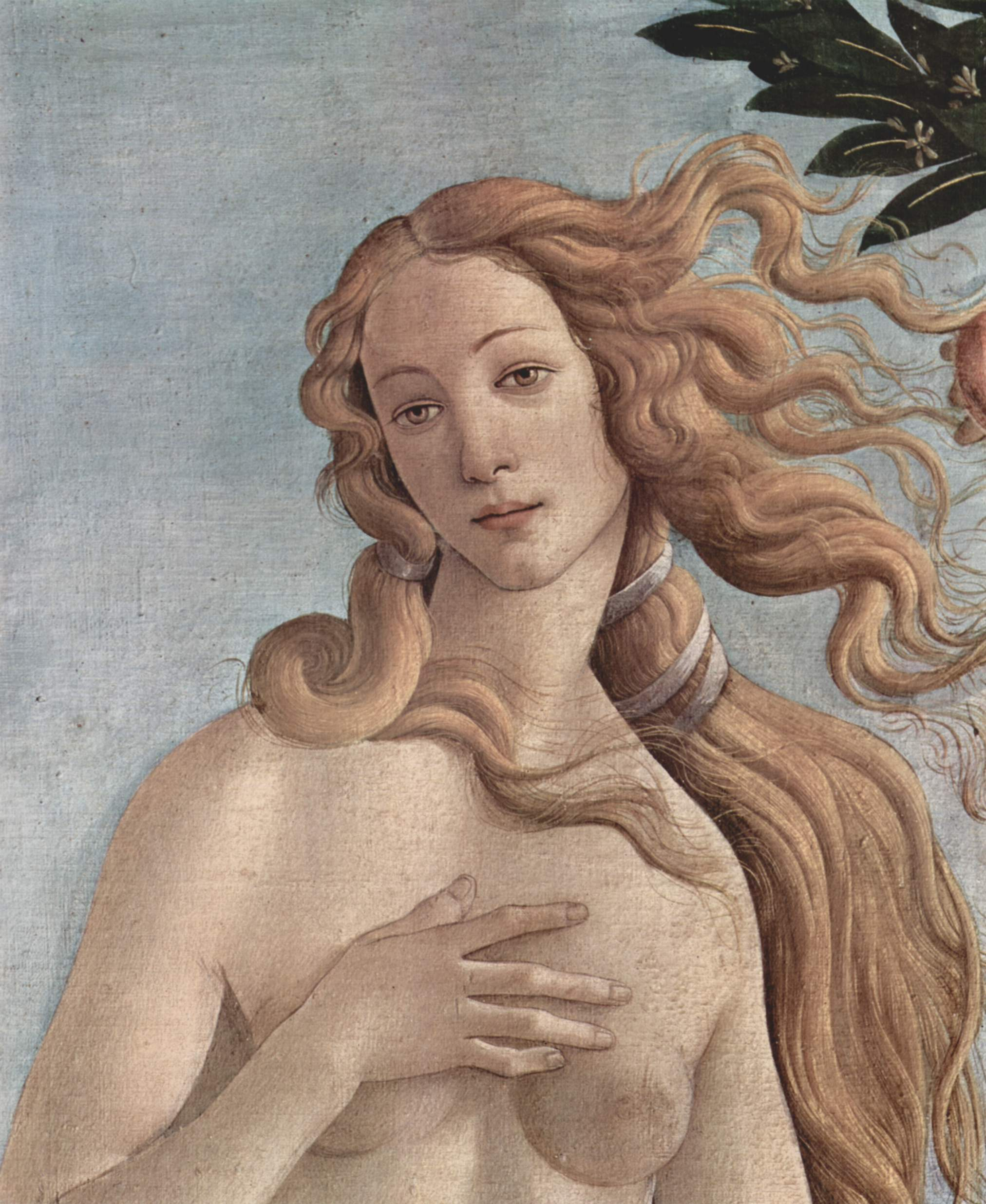
Detail of the Venus figure in The Birth of Venus by Sandro Botticelli, circa 1484-1486

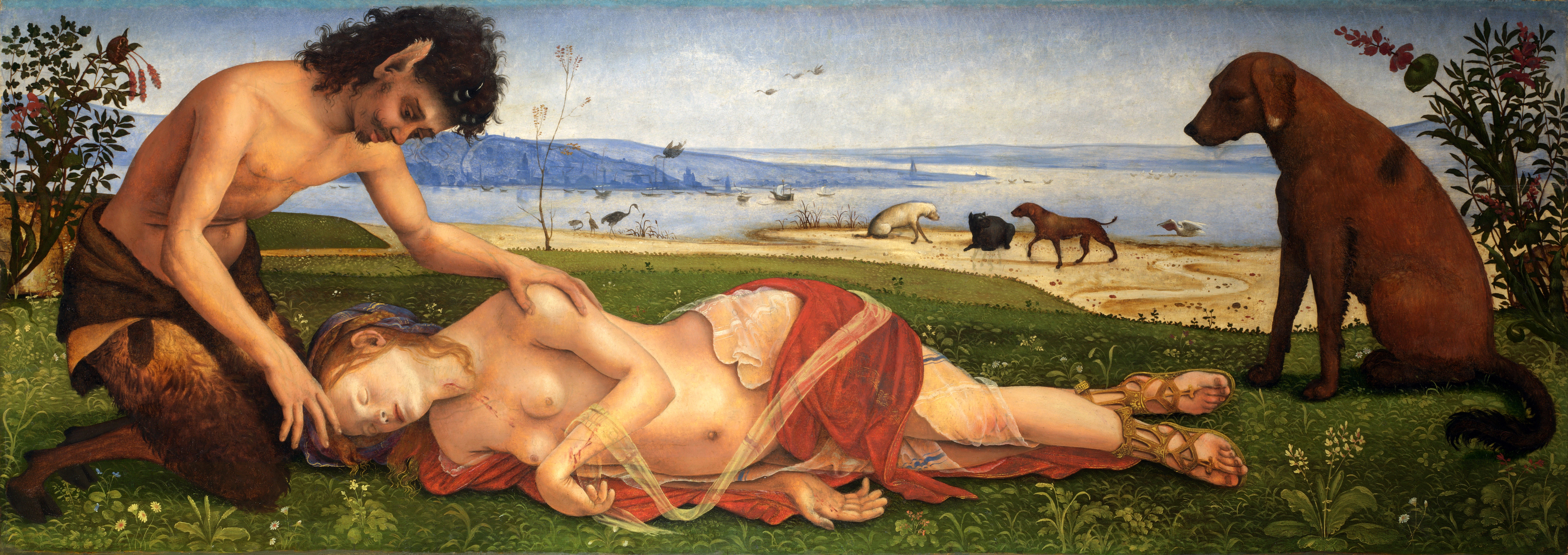
A Satyr mourning over a Nymph by Piero di Cosimo, circa 1495

Regarding each Portrait of a Woman pictured above, credited to the workshop of Sandro Botticelli, Ronald Lightbown claims they were creations of Botticelli's workshop that were likely neither drawn nor painted exclusively by Botticelli himself. Regarding these two paintings, he also notes that "[Botticelli's work]shop...executed portraits of ninfe, or fair ladies...all probably fancy portraits of ideal beauties, rather than real ladies."

Simonetta Vespucci may also be depicted in the painting by Piero di Cosimo titled Portrait of a woman, said to be of Simonetta Vespucci, which portrays a woman as Cleopatra, with an asp around her neck. Yet how closely this resembles Simonetta is uncertain, not least because it is a posthumous portrait created about 14 years after her death. (Worth noting as well is the fact that Piero di Cosimo was only 14 years old the year of Simonetta's death.) The museum that currently houses this painting, the Musée Condé, questions the identity of its alleged subject and titles it "Portrait of a woman, said to be of Simonetta Vespucci", noting that the inscription of her name at the bottom of the painting may have been added at a later date.

== Sources ==
- Ettle, Ross Brooke, "The Venus dilemma: notes on Botticelli and Simonetta Cattaneo Vespucci," Notes in the History of Art 27, no. 4 (Summer 2008): 3–10. DOI: 10.1086/sou.27.4.23207901
- Lightbown, Ronald W. (1989). Sandro Botticelli: Life and Work. Thames and Hudson (Abbeville Press). p. 336. ISBN 9780896599314.
- Pozzilli, Paolo, Vollero, Luca, Colao, Anna Maria, "Venus by Botticelli and her Pituitary Adenoma", Endocrine Practice, vol. 25(10) (2019): 1067–1073. DOI: 10.4158/EP-2019-0024
