= Piero di Cosimo =

Italian painter (1462–1522)

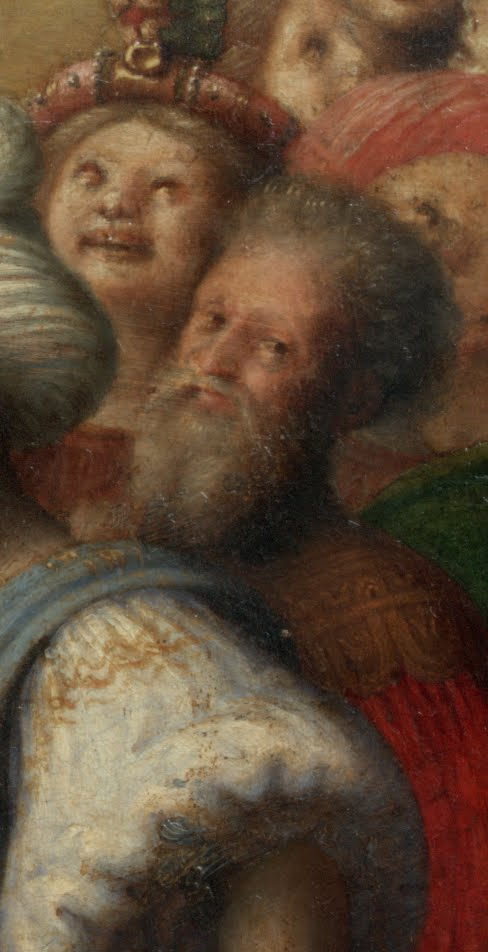
- Presumed self-portrait at the right side of his painting Perseus Freeing Andromeda
- Born: 2 January 1462; Florence, Republic of Florence
- Died: 12 April 1522 (aged 60); Florence, Republic of Florence
- Education: Cosimo Rosselli
- Known for: Painting
- Movement: High Renaissance

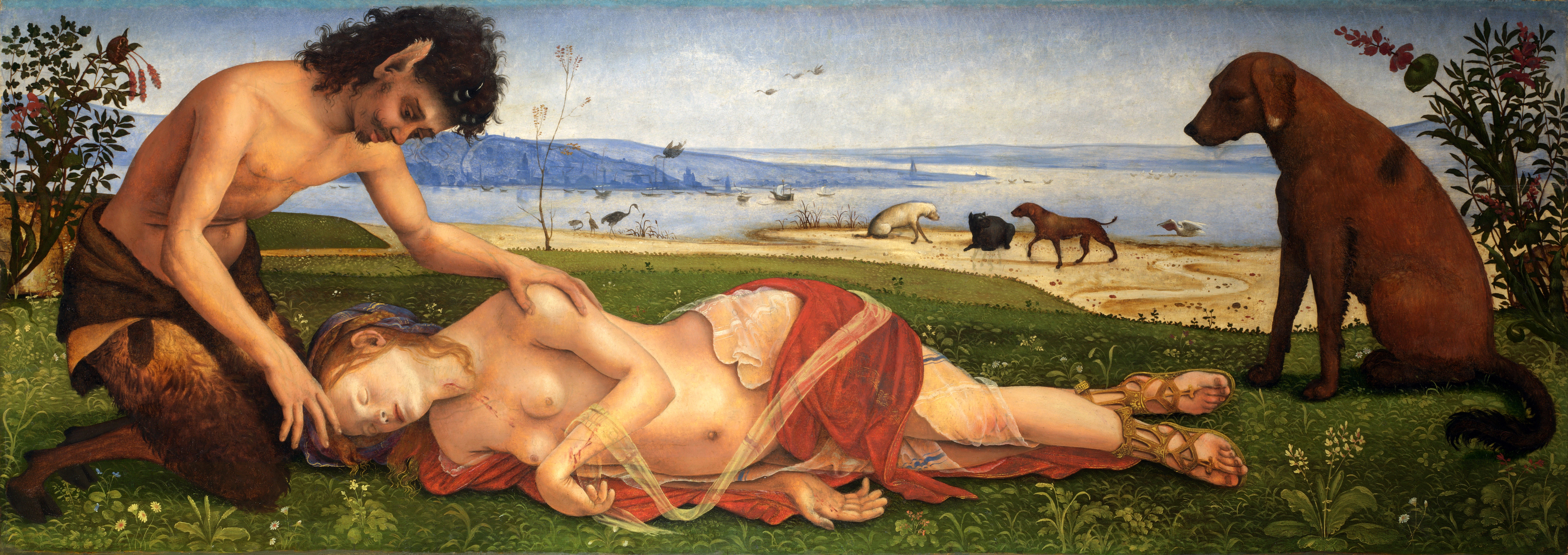
The Death of Procris, c. 1495

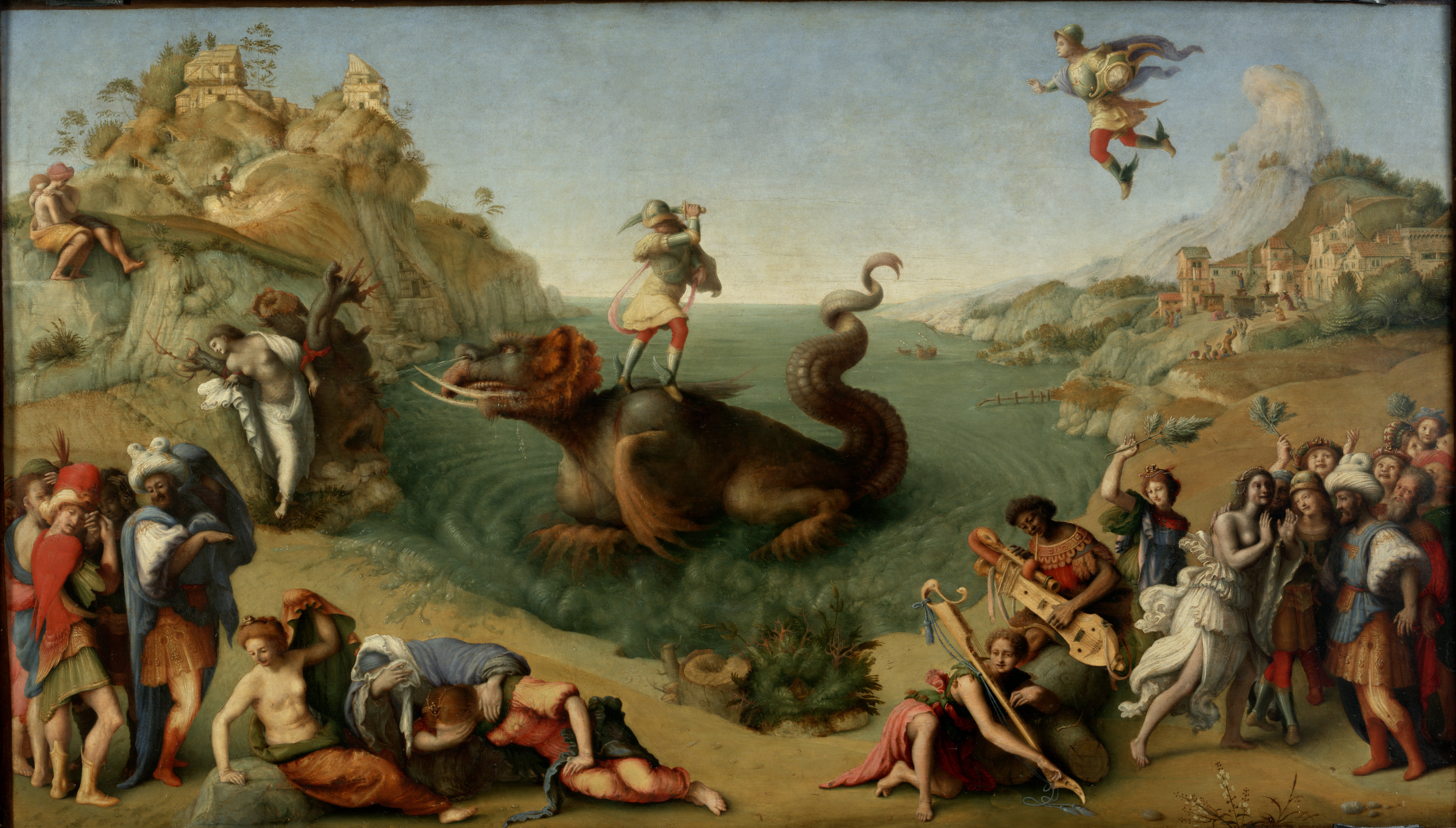
Perseus Freeing Andromeda, oil on canvas, 1510 or 1513, Uffizi

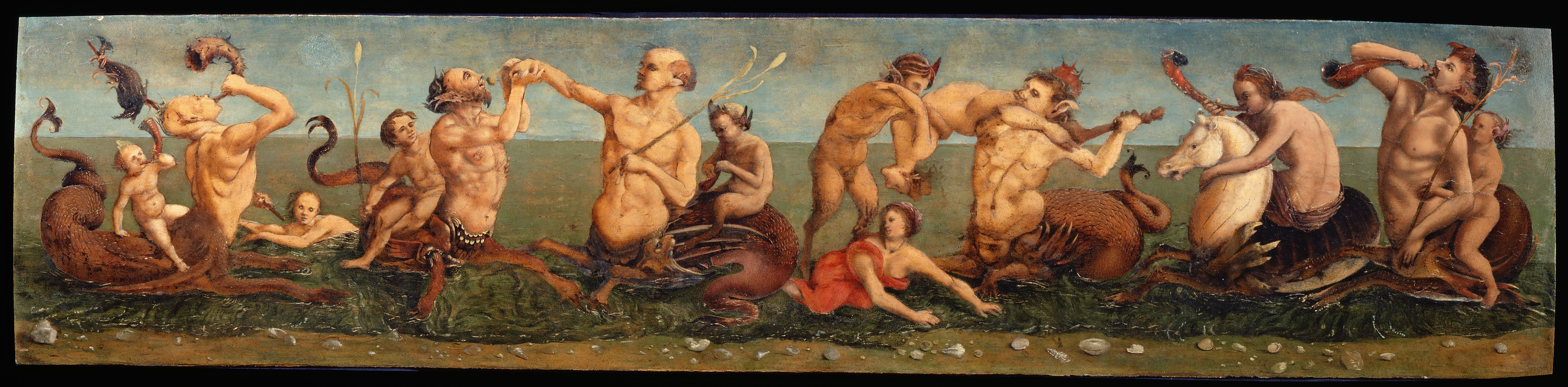
Tritons and Nereids (1500), oil on panel, 37 x158 cm, Milano, Altomani collection

Piero di Cosimo (2 January 1462 – 12 April 1522), also known as Piero di Lorenzo, was an Italian Renaissance painter, who continued to use an essentially Early Renaissance style into the 16th century.

He is most famous for the mythological and allegorical subjects he painted in the late Quattrocento; he is said to have abandoned these to return to religious subjects under the influence of Savonarola, the preacher who exercised a huge sway in Florence in the 1490s, and had a similar effect on Botticelli. The High Renaissance style of the new century had little influence on him, and he retained the straightforward realism of his figures, which combines with an often whimsical treatment of his subjects to create the distinctive mood of his works.

Vasari has many stories of his eccentricity, and the mythological subjects have an individual and quirky fascination. He trained under Cosimo Rosselli, whose daughter he married, and assisted him in his Sistine Chapel frescos.

He was also influenced by Early Netherlandish painting, and busy landscapes feature in many works, often forests seen close at hand. Several of his most striking secular works are in the long "landscape" format used for paintings inset into cassone wedding chests or spalliera headboards or panelling. He was apparently famous for designing the temporary decorations for Carnival and other festivities.

== Biography ==
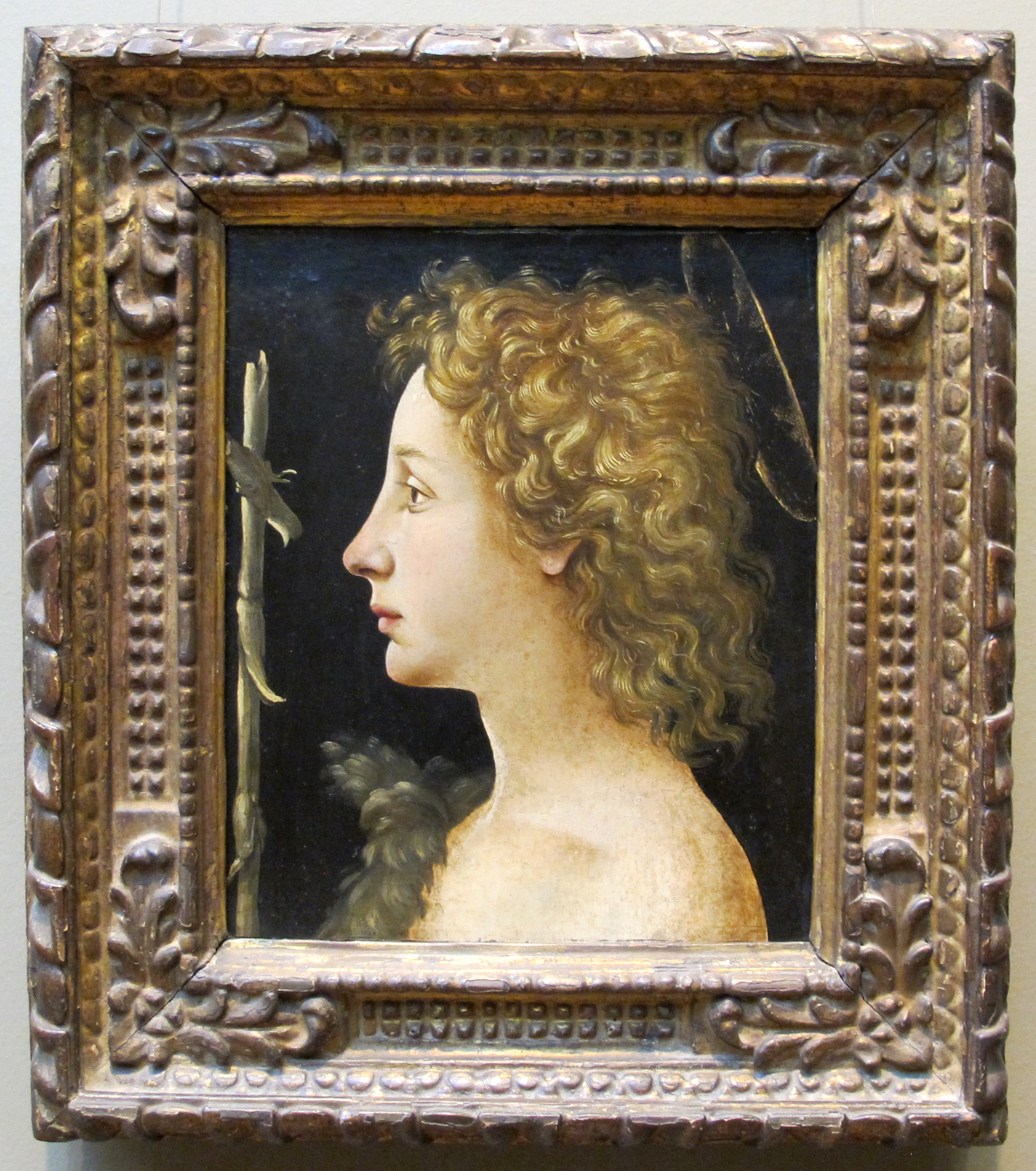
Young St John the Baptist, 1490s

The son of a goldsmith, Lorenzo di Piero, Piero was born in Florence and apprenticed under the artist Cosimo Rosseli, from whom he derived his popular name and whom he assisted in the painting of the Sistine Chapel in 1481.

In the first phase of his career, Piero was influenced by the Netherlandish naturalism of Hugo van der Goes, whose Portinari Triptych (now at the Uffizi Gallery in Florence) helped to lead the whole of Florentine painting into new channels. From him, most probably, Cosimo acquired the love of landscape and the intimate knowledge of the growth of flowers and of animal life. The manner of Hugo van der Goes is especially apparent in the Adoration of the Shepherds, at the Berlin Museum.

He journeyed to Rome in 1482 with his master, Rosselli. He proved himself a true child of the Renaissance by depicting subjects of Classical mythology in such pictures as Venus, Mars, and Cupid, The Death of Procris, the Perseus and Andromeda series, at the Uffizi, and many others. Inspired to the Vitruvius' account of the evolution of man, Piero's mythical compositions show the bizarre presence of hybrid forms of men and animals, or the man learning to use fire and tools. The multitudes of nudes in these works shows the influence of Luca Signorelli on Piero's art.

During his lifetime, Piero acquired a reputation for eccentricity—a reputation enhanced and exaggerated by later commentators such as Giorgio Vasari, who included a biography of Piero di Cosimo in his Lives of the Artists. Reportedly, he was frightened of thunderstorms, and so pyrophobic that he rarely cooked his food; he lived on a diet of hard-boiled eggs, which he prepared 50 at a time while boiling glue for his artworks. He also resisted any cleaning of his studio, or trimming of the fruit trees of his orchard; he lived, wrote Vasari, "more like a beast than a man".

If, as Vasari asserts, he spent the last years of his life in gloomy retirement, the change was probably due to preacher Girolamo Savonarola, under whose influence he turned his attention once more to religious art. The death of his master Roselli may also have affected Piero's morose elder years. The Immaculate Conception with Saints, at the Uffizi, and the Holy Family, at Dresden, illustrate the religious fervour to which he was stimulated by Savonarola.

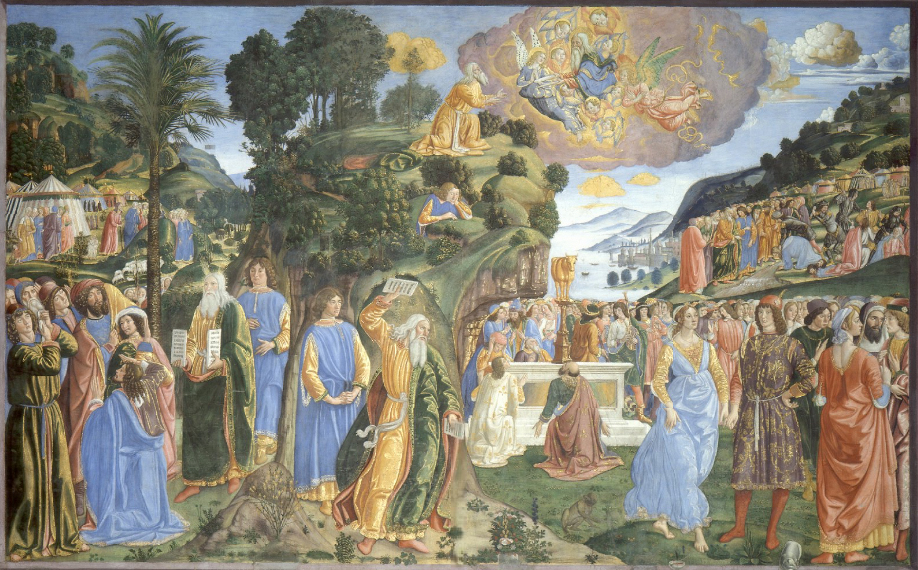
PROMULGATIO LEGIS SCRIPTE PER MOISEM – fresco by Cosimo Rosselli

With the exception of the landscape background in Rosselli's fresco of the Sermon on the Mount, in the Sistine Chapel, there is no record of any fresco work from his brush. On the other hand, Piero enjoyed a great reputation as a portrait painter: the most famous of his work is in fact the portrait of a Florentine noblewoman, Simonetta Vespucci, mistress of Giuliano de' Medici. According to Vasari, Piero excelled in designing pageants and triumphal processions for the pleasure-loving youths of Florence, and gives a vivid description of one such procession at the end of the carnival of 1507, which illustrated the triumph of death. Piero di Cosimo exercised considerable influence upon his fellow pupils Albertinelli and Bartolomeo della Porta, and was the master of Andrea del Sarto.

Vasari gave Piero's date of death as 1521, and this date is still repeated by many sources, including the Encyclopædia Britannica. However, contemporary documents reveal that he died of plague on 12 April 1522. He is featured in George Eliot's novel Romola.

== Selected works ==
- Madonna and Child Enthroned with Sts. Peter, John the Baptist, Dominic, and Nicholas of Bari (1481–85) tempera and oil on panel, St. Louis Art Museum, St. Louis, Missouri

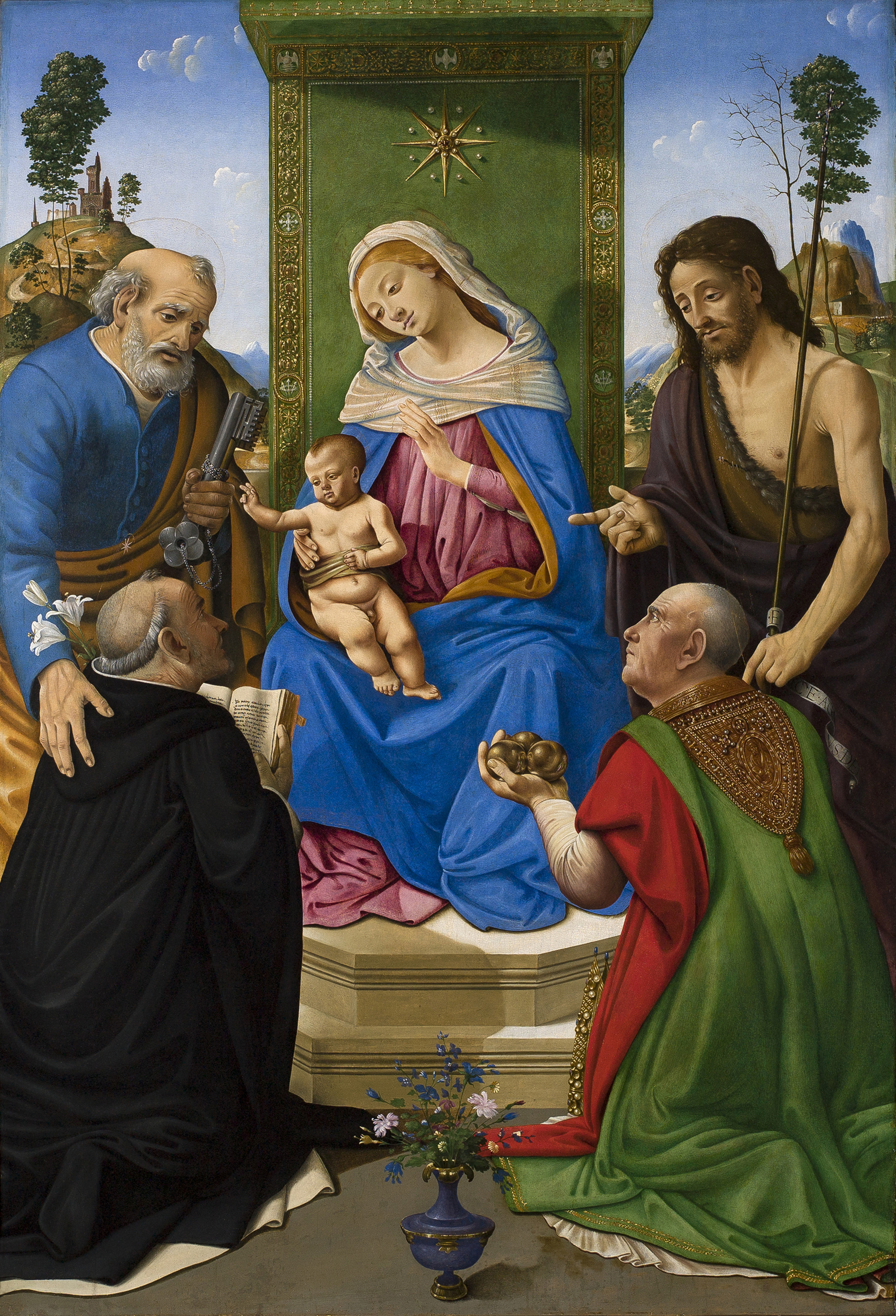
Madonna and Child Enthroned with Saints

- Portrait of Simonetta Vespucci (c. 1480) Oil on panel, 57 x 42 cm, Musée Condé, Chantilly, France
- The Visitation with Saints Nicholas and Anthony (1489–1490) Wood, 184 x 189, National Gallery of Art, Washington
- Venus, Mars, and Cupid (1490) Wood panel, 72 x 182 cm, Staatliche Museen, Berlin
- Vulcan and Aeolus (c. 1490) Oil and tempera on canvas, National Gallery of Canada, Ottawa
- St Mary Magdalene (1490s) Tempera on panel, 72,5 x 76 cm, Galleria Nazionale d'Arte Antica, Rome
- Mystical Marriage of St. Catherine of Alexandria (1493) Oil on panel, Ospedale degli Innocenti, Florence
- Jason and Queen Hypsipyle with the Women of Lemnos (ca 1499) Private Collection
- Tritons and Nereids, Oil on Panel, 37x158 cm, Milan, Altomani collection
- Allegory (1500) Panel, National Gallery of Art, Washington
- The Nativity with The Infant St. John (c. 1500) Oil on panel, National Gallery of Art, Washington
- St. John the Evangelist (1504–06) Oil on panel, Honolulu Museum of Art
- The Discovery of Honey by Bacchus (c. 1505–1510) Oil on panel, Art Museum, Worcester, Massachusetts
- The Finding of Vulcan on Lemnos (1495–1505) Oil and tempera on canvas, Wadsworth Atheneum, Hartford, Connecticut
- Perseus Freeing Andromeda (c. 1515) Oil on wood, 70 x 123 cm, Uffizi, Florence
- Portraits of Giuliano and Francesco Giamberti da Sangallo (c. 1485) Diptych, wood panel, 47,5 x 33,5 cm, Rijksmuseum, Amsterdam
- The Death of Procris (c. 1500) Oil on panel, 65 x 183 cm, National Gallery, London
- Virgin with Child, St. John the Baptist and an Angel (c. 1500–1510) Oil on panel, diameter 129 cm, São Paulo Museum of Art, São Paulo
- The Adoration of the Christ Child (1505) Oil on wood, Galleria Borghese, Rome
- The Forest Fire (c. 1505) Oil on panel, 71 x 202 cm, Ashmolean Museum, Oxford
- Immaculate Conception with Saints (c. 1510 or c. 1498) Wood panel, 206 x 172 cm, Uffizi, Florence
- The Misfortunes of Silenus (c. 1505–1510) Oil on panel, Fogg Art Museum, Cambridge, Massachusetts
- The Myth of Prometheus (1515) Oil on panel, Alte Pinakothek, Munich. Two renderings were made with the same title. The Munich version depicts a central statue among other activities in the painting.
- The Myth of Prometheus (1515) Oil on panel, Musée des Beaux-Arts, Strasbourg. Two renderings were made with the same title. The Strasbourg version depicts a statue addressed by Prometheus on the left side of the canvas, with other activities depicted elsewhere on the canvas with equal prominence, including a dark bird on the right side of the canvas apparently the symbolic of the eternal torment of Prometheus.
- The Building of a Palace (1515–20) oil on panel, 83 x 197 cm, Ringling Museum of Art, Sarasota, Florida
- Madonna and Child with Saints and Angels (c. 1520) oil on wood panel, Philbrook Museum of Art, Tulsa, Oklahoma

== Gallery ==
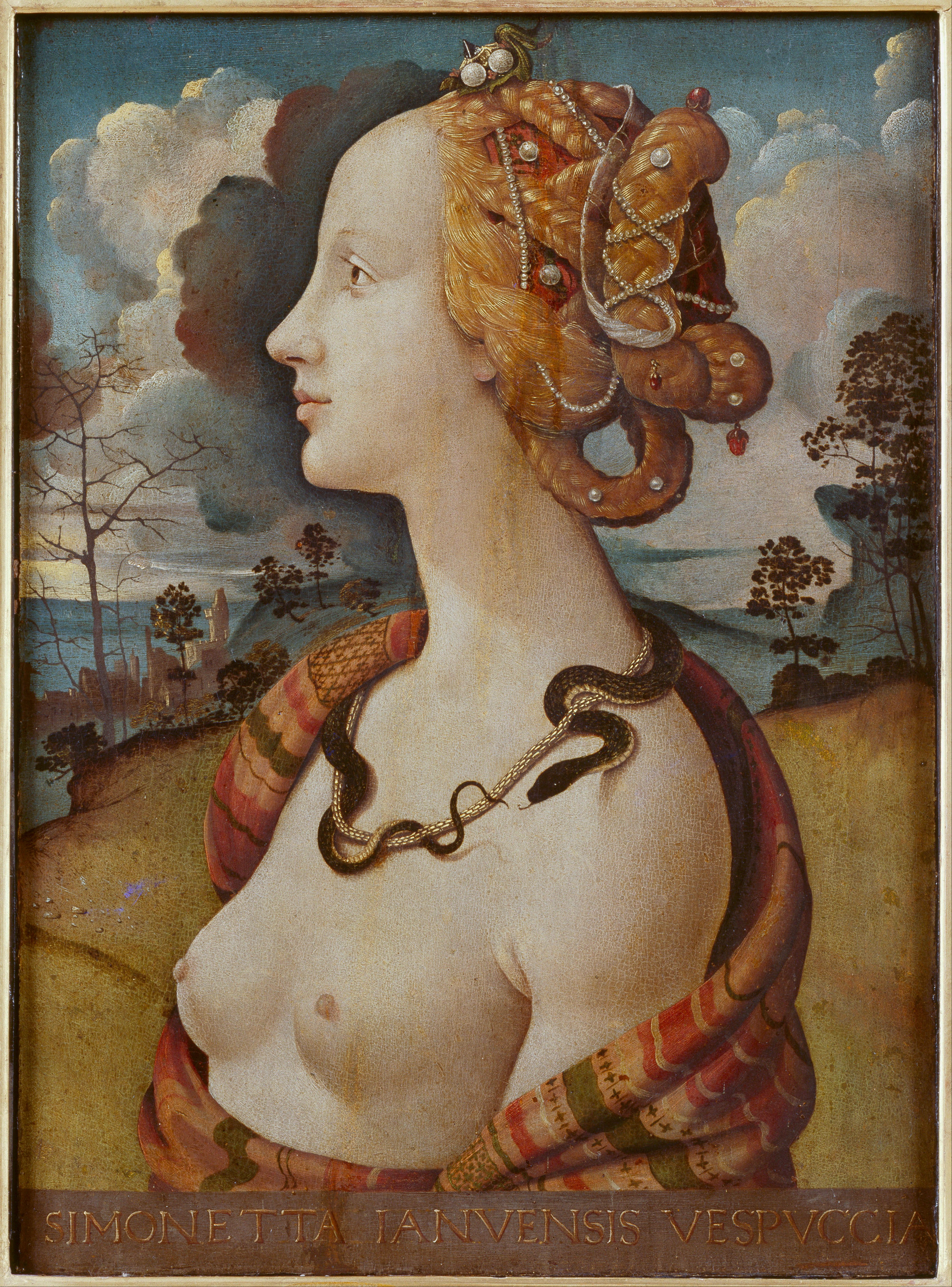
Portrait of Simonetta Vespucci, oil on panel painting, c. 1480, 57 x 42 cm, [[Château de Chantilly|Musée Condé, Chantilly]], France

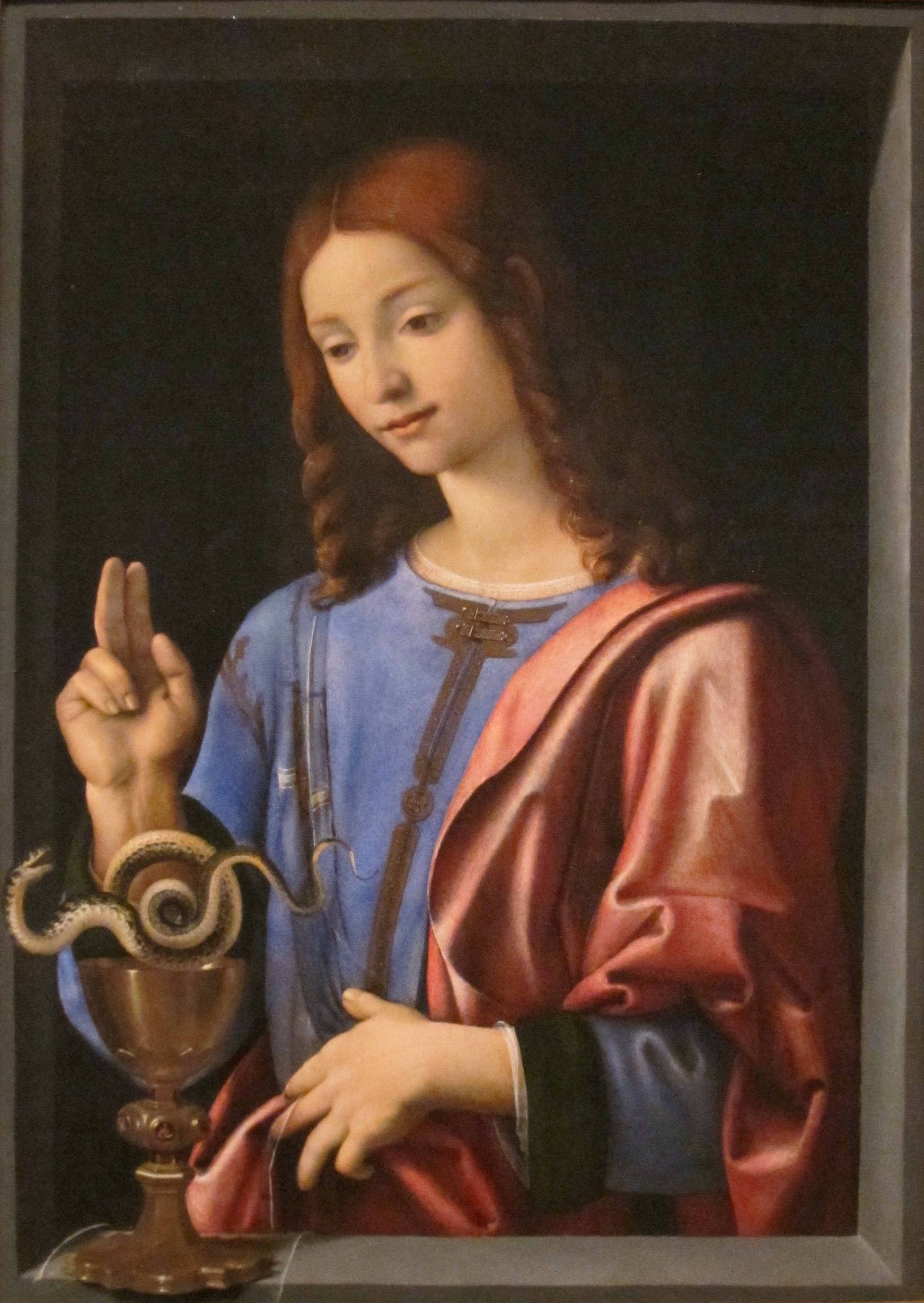
St. John the Evangelist, oil on panel, 1504-6, Honolulu Museum of Art,

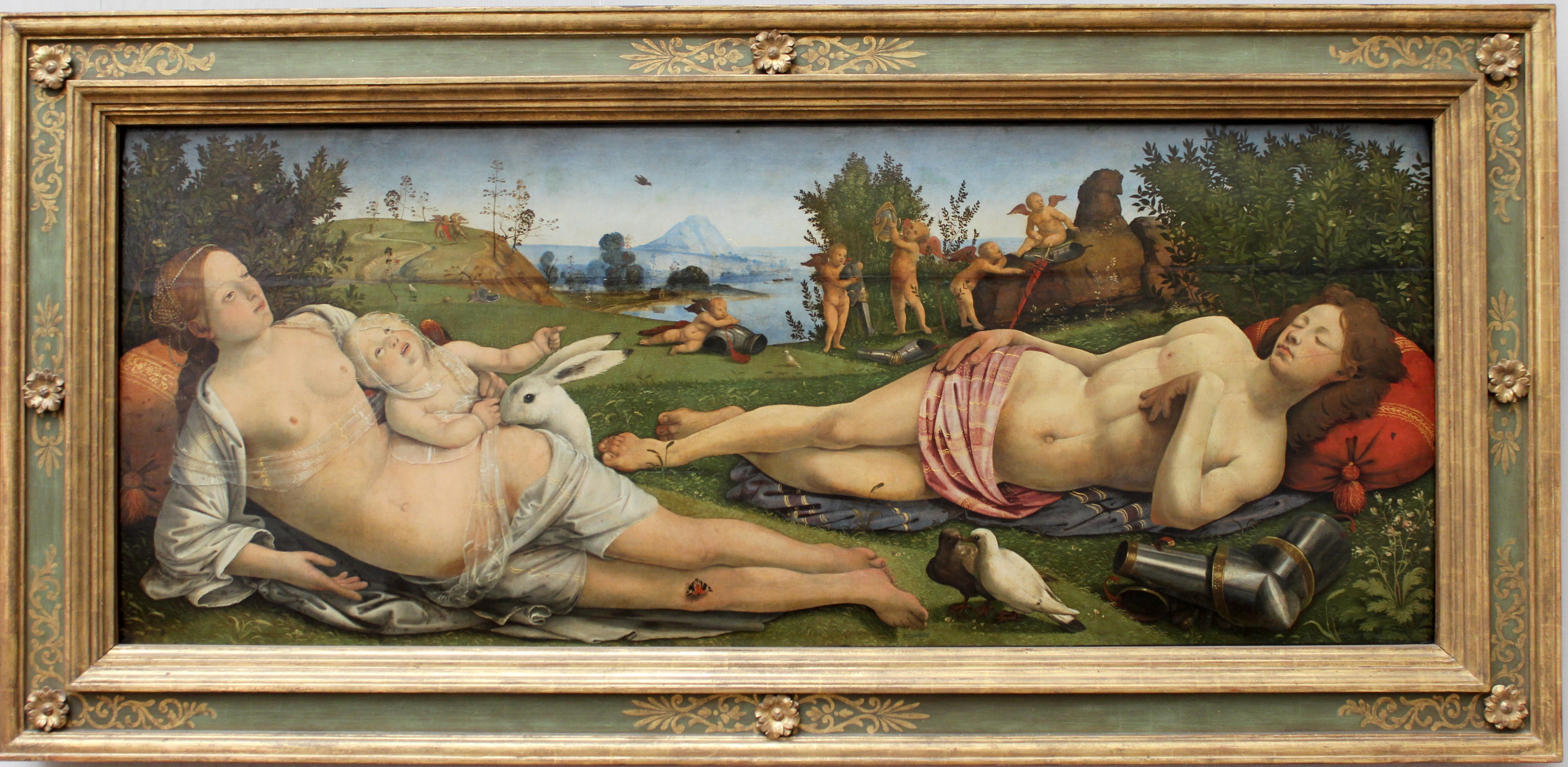
Venus, Mars and Cupid, c. 1505, Gemäldegalerie, Berlin

Visitation, with Saints Nicolas and Anthony Abbot, c. 1490, National Gallery of Art, Washington DC
