= The Discovery of Honey by Bacchus =

Painting by Piero di Cosimo

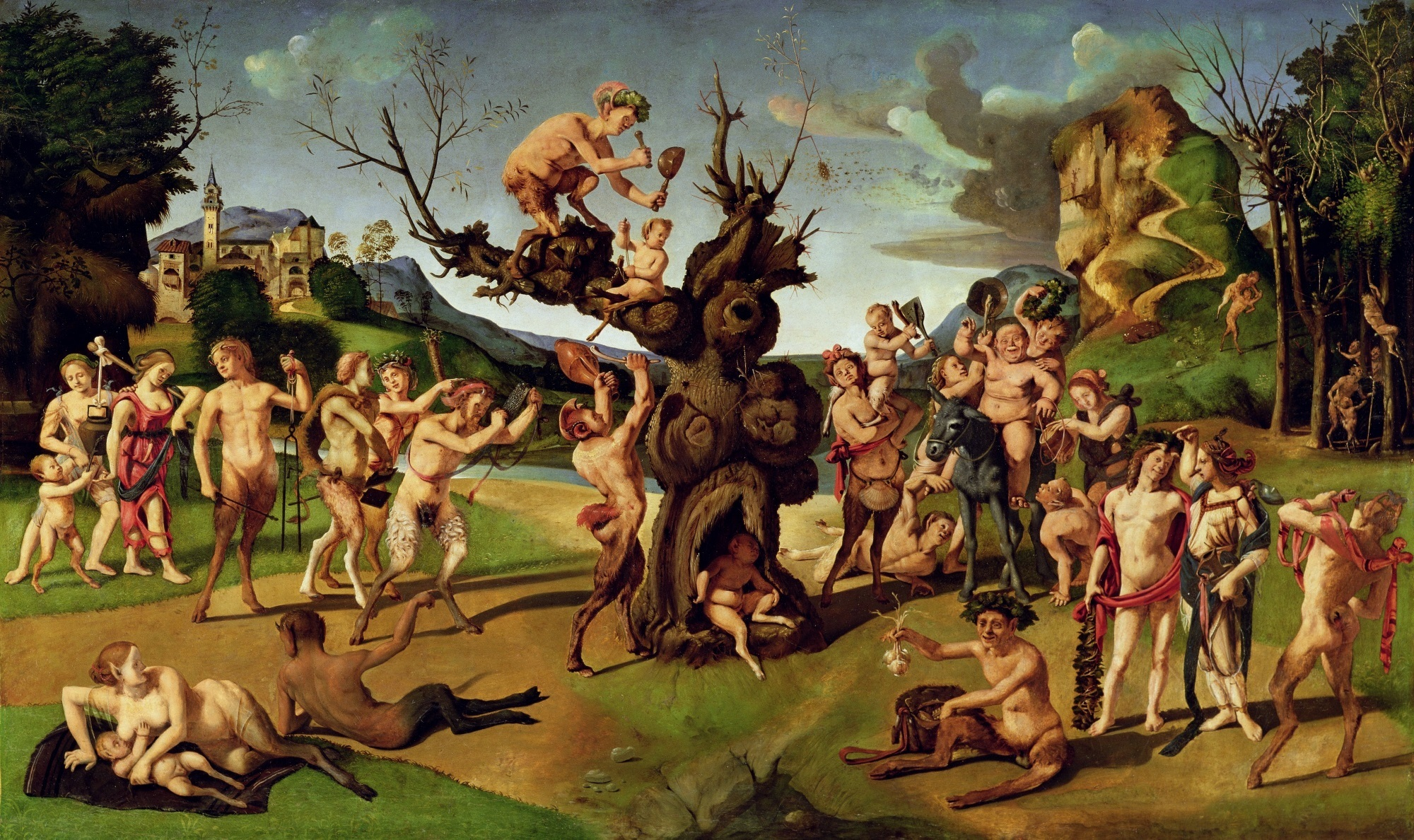
- Artist: Piero di Cosimo
- Year: c. 1499
- Medium: Tempera with oil glazes on panel
- Dimensions: 79.2 cm × 128.5 cm (31.2 in × 50.6 in)
- Location: Worcester Art Museum, Worcester, Massachusetts

The Discovery of Honey by Bacchus is a painting by Piero di Cosimo from c. 1499. It depicts the god Bacchus and the discovery of honey, as described in the ancient Roman poem Fasti by Ovid. It is in the collection of the Worcester Art Museum in Worcester, Massachusetts.

== Background ==
The Discovery of Honey by Bacchus was commissioned together with a companion painting, The Misfortunes of Silenus, by Giovanni Vespucci in Florence. Both works represent an emerging, private demand for paintings with secular subjects. Like Piero di Cosimo's other mythological paintings, they were made for an audience well versed in the works of Ovid and Virgil, inviting the viewers to demonstrate their erudition.

== Subject and composition ==
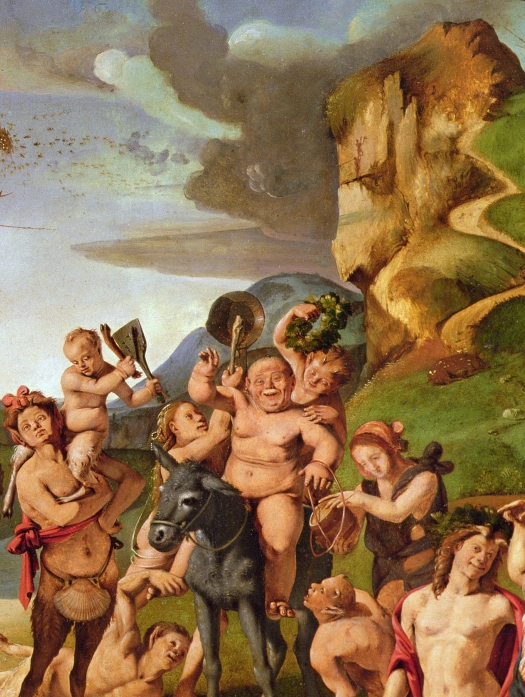
A close-up of Silenus

The subject is from Book III of Ovid's Fasti, which had been published in Venice in 1497. At the centre is a group of satyrs and bacchantes who make noises to get a swarm of bees to settle in the trunk of a hollow tree. From left and right, more companions of Bacchus join the event, including Silenus, who rides in from the right on an ass, visibly drunk and supported by satyrs and bacchantes. In the foreground to the right are Bacchus, leaning on a thyrsus, and Ariadne, who points at the wreath on the god's head. To the upper left is a town and to the upper right are a steep hill and a forest.

== Analysis ==
The art historian Erwin Panofsky interpreted the painting as a reflection of the "Epicurean evolutionism" present in the Latin writings of Lucretius and Vitruvius, which had been reintroduced to Renaissance audiences through Genealogia Deorum Gentilium by Boccaccio. The juxtaposition of the "pastoral civilisation" to the left and the "unmitigated wildness" to the right, according to Panofsky, symbolises the emergence of civilisation, in which the discovery of honey was considered an important step, commemorated through the eating and offering of honey cakes (liba) at Liberalia. The art historian Dennis Geronimus has written that Panofsky's evolutionist interpretation should be taken with reservations, as its moral roots lie in religion, and the juxtaposition it is based on is "largely divorced from the painting itself".

== Preservation and provenance ==
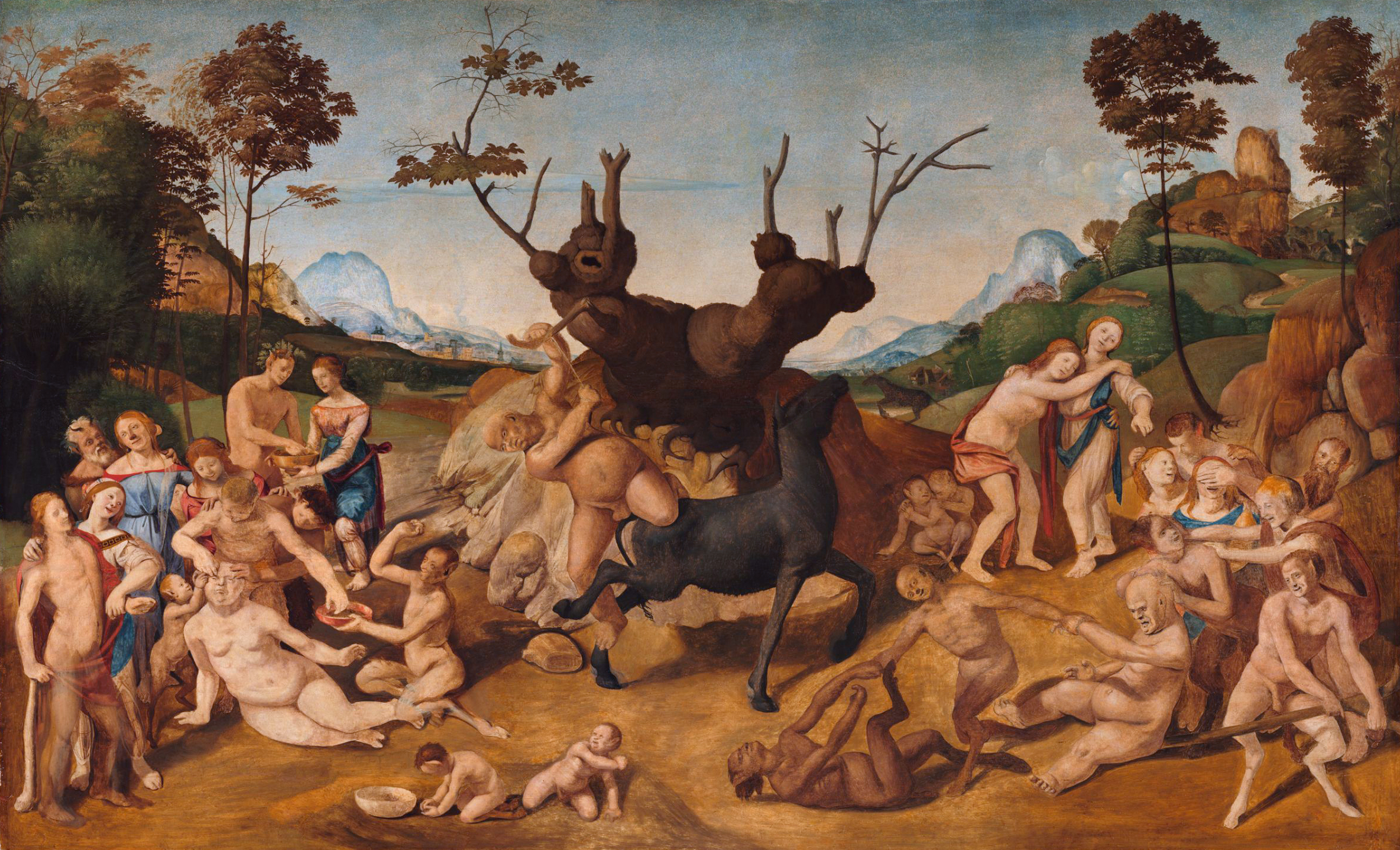
The Misfortunes of Silenus (Fogg Museum, Harvard University)

The Discovery of Honey by Bacchus is significantly better preserved than The Misfortunes of Silenus, with clearer colours and fewer over-painted sections. Since 1937, it is in the collection of the Worcester Art Museum in Worcester, Massachusetts.
