= Venus, Mars and Cupid =

Painting by Piero di Cosimo

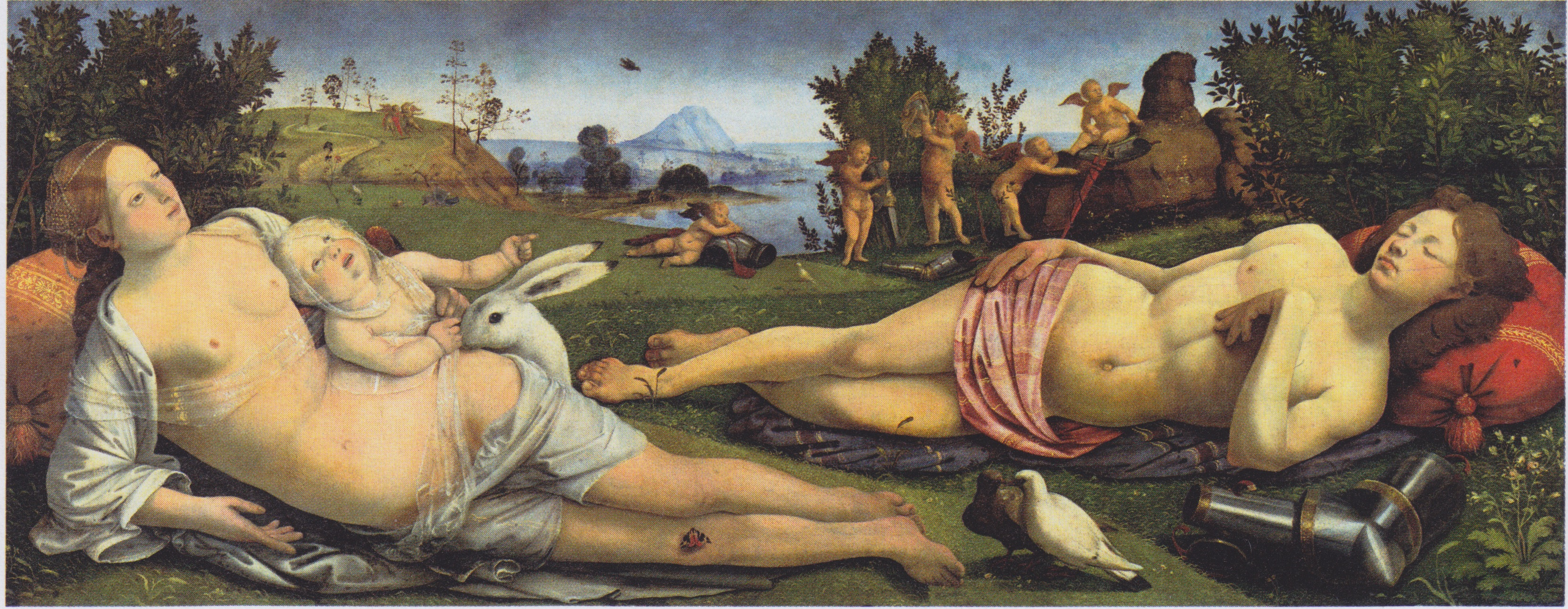
- Artist: Piero di Cosimo
- Year: c. 1505
- Medium: Oil painting on poplar panel
- Dimensions: 72 cm × 182 cm (28 in × 72 in)
- Location: Gemäldegalerie; Berlin

Venus, Mars and Cupid is a c.1505 oil on panel painting by Piero di Cosimo. It is currently held in the Gemäldegalerie art museum in Berlin, Germany. It probably originated as part of a decorated cassone.

Its neo-Platonic subject echoes that of Sandro Botticelli's Venus and Mars (1482-1483; National Gallery, London). The god of war Mars sleeps in a post-coital slumber, conquered by the nude Venus, making both works an allegory of Love triumphing over War. Venus plays with her son Cupid, with her symbolic doves in front of Mars. In the background a group of putti in the foreground play with Mars' weapons and armour between bushes of myrtle, Venus' plant, where she had taken refuge after her birth off Cyprus.

== Details ==
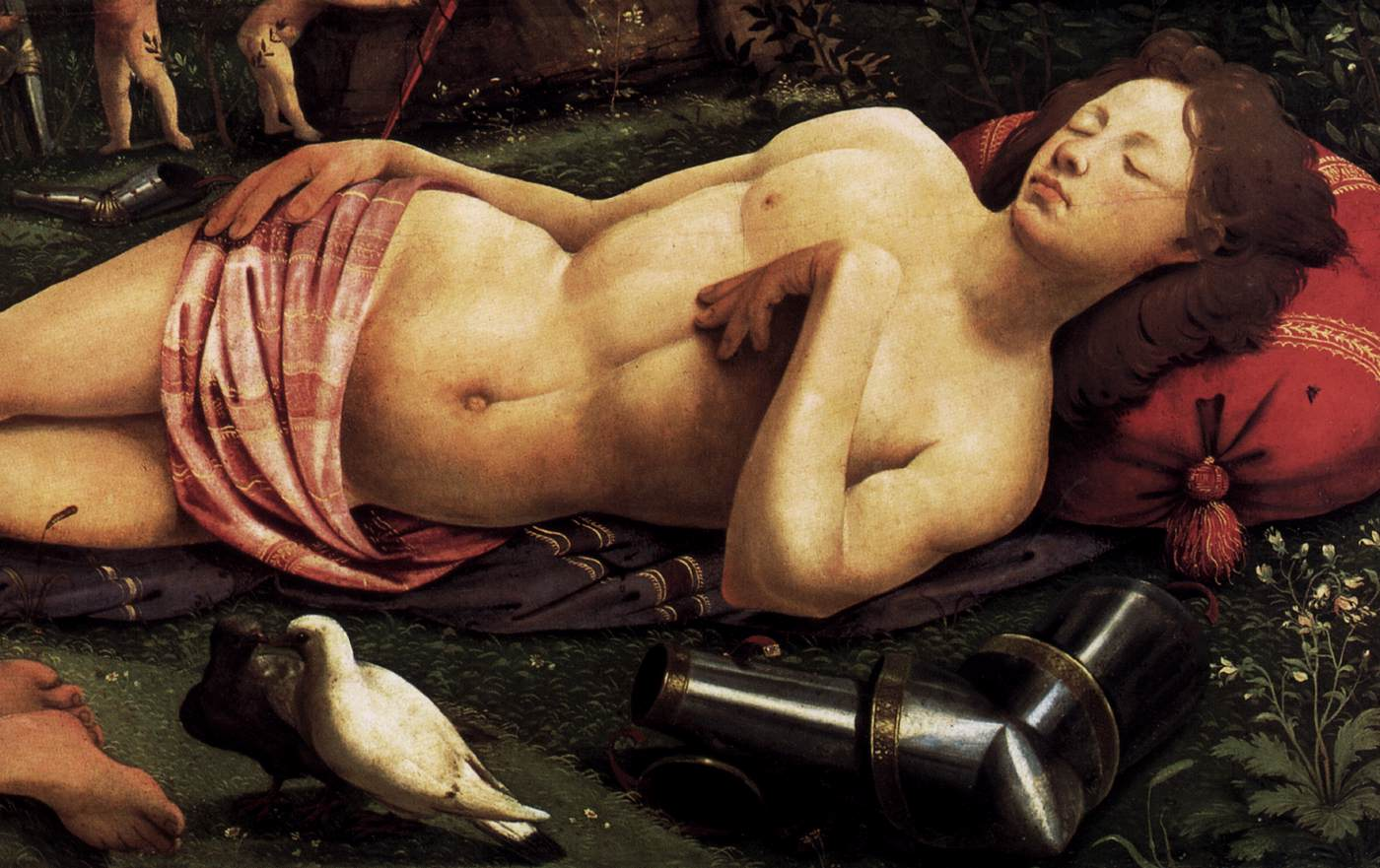

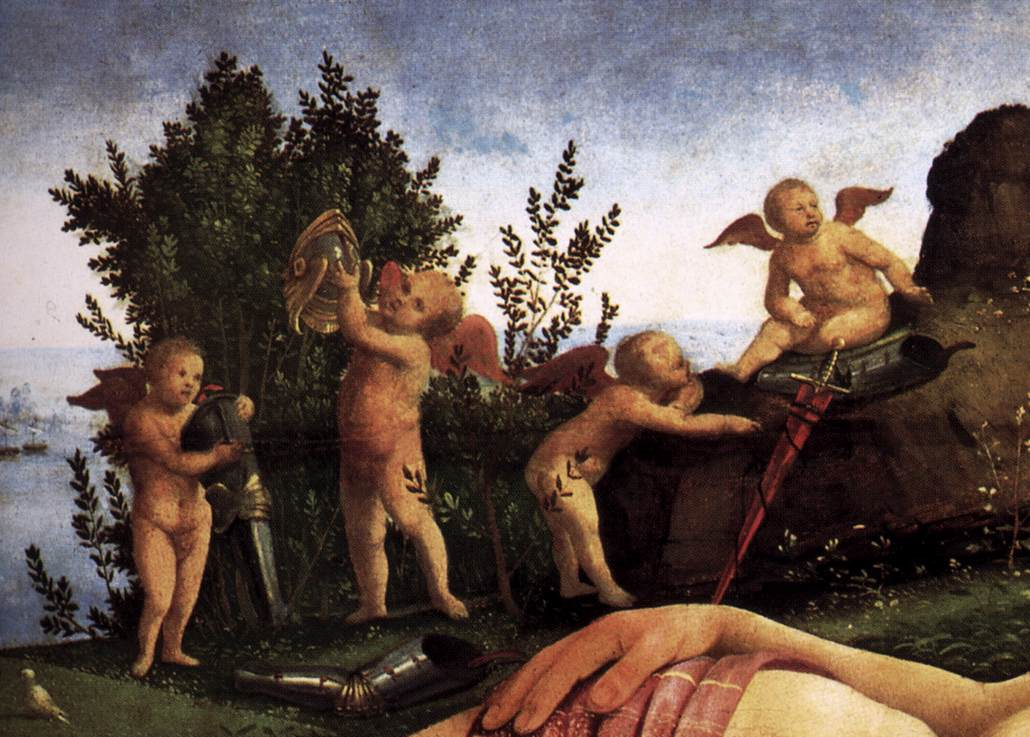

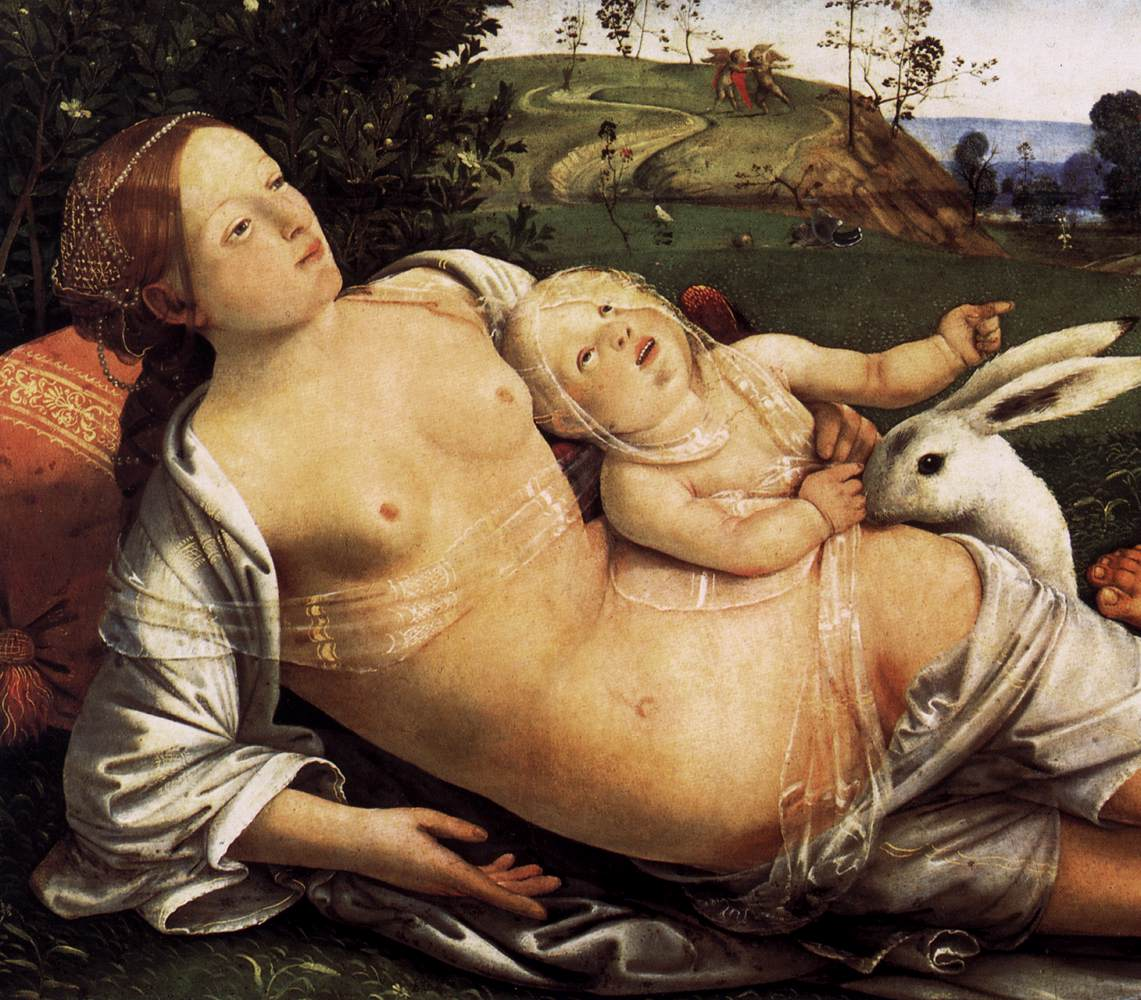

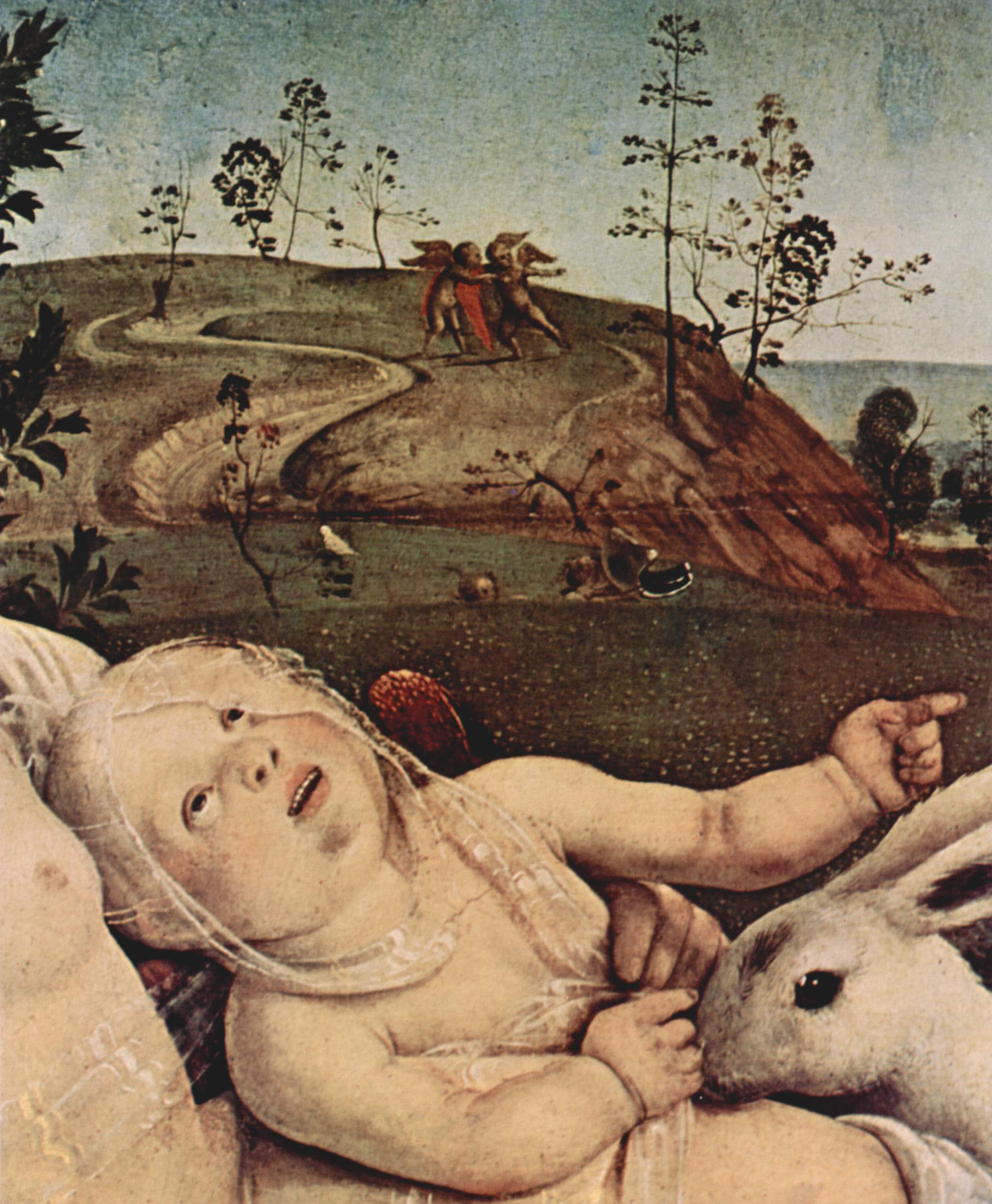

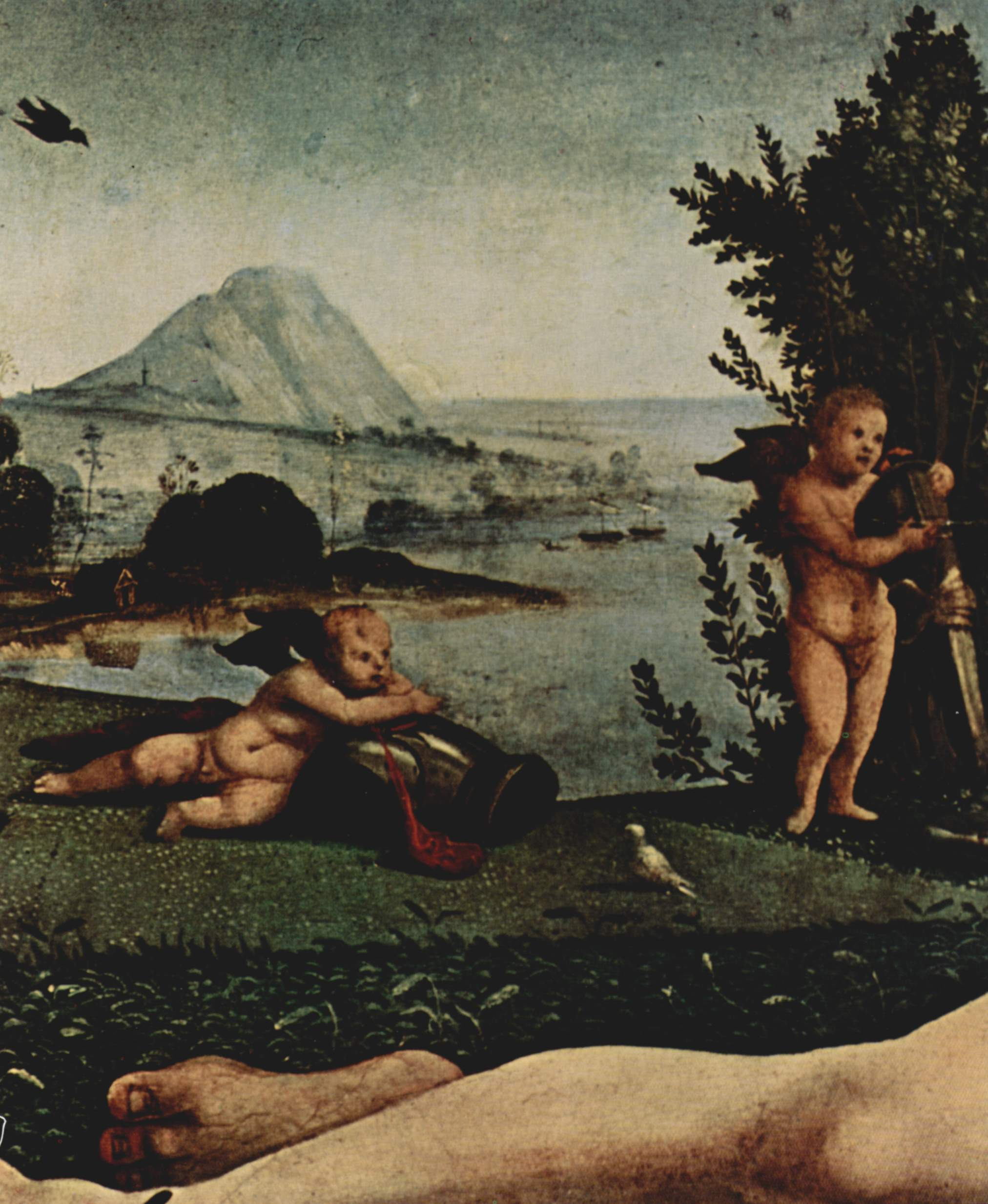
