= The Forest Fire =

Painting by Piero di Cosimo

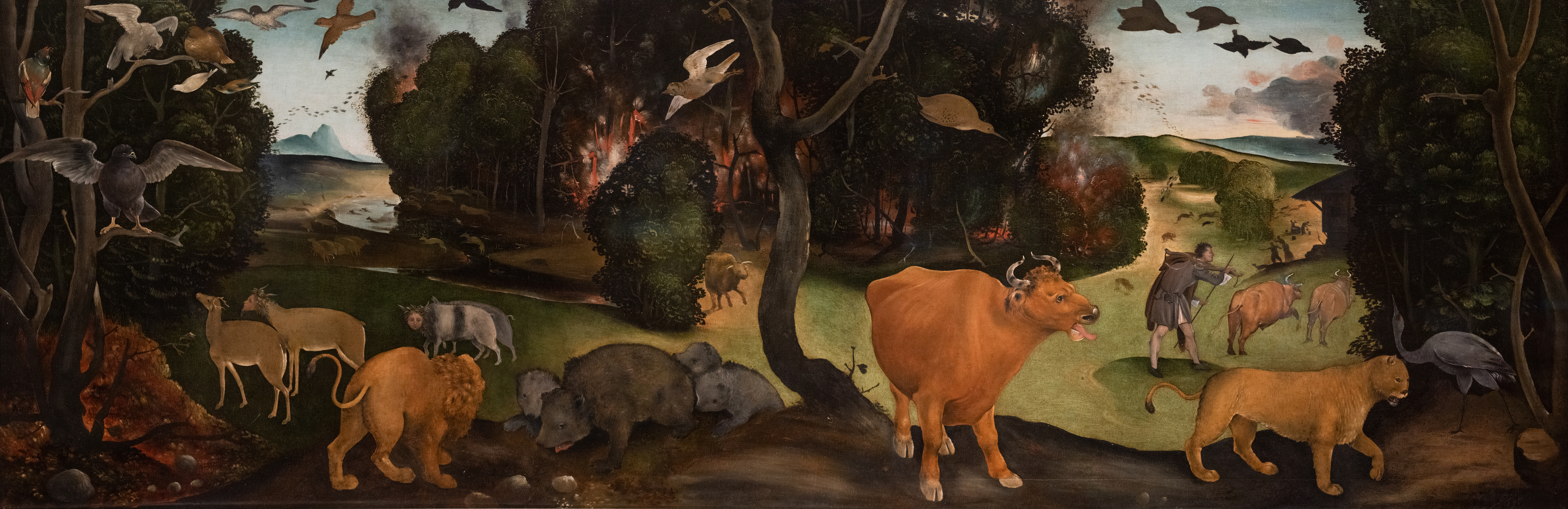
- Artist: Piero di Cosimo
- Year: 1505
- Medium: Oil on panel
- Dimensions: 71 cm × 202 cm (28 in × 80 in)
- Location: Ashmolean Museum, Oxford

The Forest Fire (c. 1505) is a painting by Italian Renaissance painter Piero di Cosimo. The painting depicts a variety of frightened animals attempting to escape a forest fire. The painting has a lot of activity, at the center of which is the raging fire itself. One of the earliest landscape paintings of the Renaissance, it includes made up animals as well as real ones. It was inspired by Book 5 of Lucretius's On the Nature of Things.
