= Portrait of Simonetta Vespucci =

Painting by Piero di Cosimo

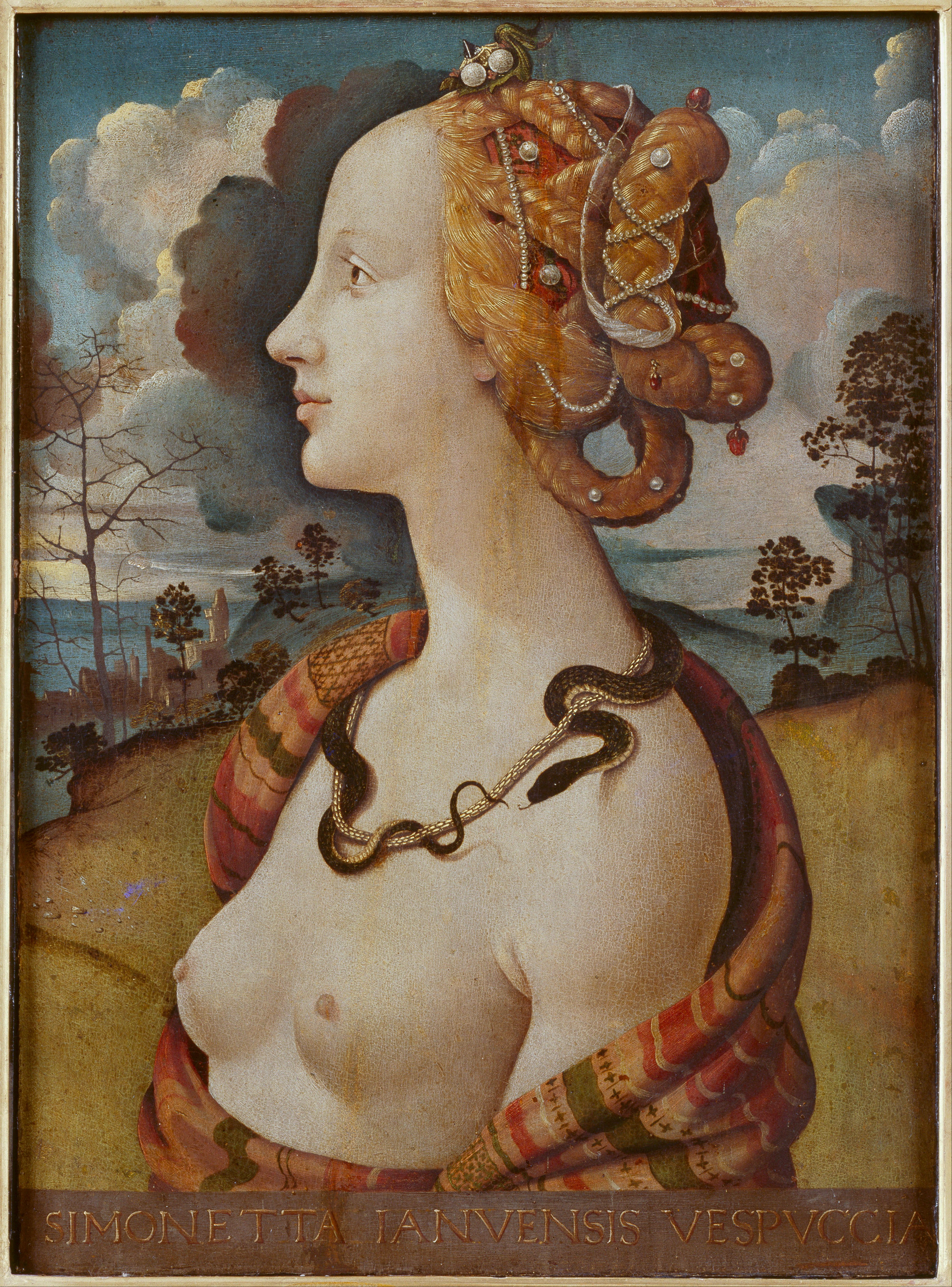
- Artist: Piero di Cosimo
- Year: c. 1490
- Medium: Tempera on panel
- Subject: Simonetta Vespucci
- Dimensions: 57 cm × 42 cm (22 in × 17 in)
- Location: Musée Condé, Chantilly

Portrait of Simonetta Vespucci is an oil on canvas painting by the Italian Renaissance painter Piero di Cosimo, dating from about 1480 or 1490. It is in the Musée Condé in Chantilly, France.

Simonetta Vespucci was a Genoese noblewoman who married Marco Vespucci of Florence at the age of either 15 or 16, and who was renowned for being the greatest beauty of her age - certainly of the city of Florence. She was admired by all of Florence for her beauty, which later became a legend after her premature death in 1476 at the age of 23. Sandro Botticelli was inspired by her features in The Birth of Venus and Piero di Cosimo was a passionate admirer.

== Style ==
The subject is a young girl portrayed at half length in profile, facing left. Her breasts are bared and a small snake twines around the necklace she is wearing. In the background is an open landscape, arid on the left and lush on the right. The dark clouds are a symbol of her early death, as is the dead tree in the background. At the base of the painting is a border with an inscription that mimics carved letters, a method used in art since the Flemish painter Jan van Eyck at the beginning of the century; it reads: SIMONETTA IANUENSIS VESPUCCIA.

The dark clouds contrast with the pure profile of the face and the clear complexion. It is traditionally identified as a portrait of Simonetta. Giorgio Vasari regarded her as portraying Cleopatra, because of the toplessness and the snake, which he identified with the asp with which, according to Plutarch, Cleopatra committed suicide. However, the art historian Norbert Schneider regards it as more likely that the iconography of the portrait derives from that in late Classical antiquity, in which the snake, especially biting its own tail, symbolized the cycle of time and hence rejuvenation, and was thus associated with Janus, the Roman god of the new year, and with Saturn, who became a "Father Time" figure because his Greek name, Kronos, was conflated with Chronos, meaning "time". The inscription refers to Simonetta as Januensis (of Genoa, but the variant spelling punning on Janus). The snake was also the symbol of Prudentia; in that interpretation, it would be praise for Simonetta's wisdom.

An alternative suggestion is that she is presented as Proserpina, with the snake symbolizing the pagans' hope of resurrection.

The bust, in 15th-century style, is slightly turned towards the spectator, so as to favour the view, and her shoulders are wrapped in a richly embroidered cloth. According to Schneider, her naked breasts would not have caused any offense to contemporary viewers. They were rather an allusion to Venus Pudica, or the "chaste" Venus, and in Paris Bordone's allegories of lovers (c. 1550) toplessness is a symbol of the wedding.

Her features have a surprising purity. The forehead is high, according to the fashion of the time which included a shaved hairline. The hairstyle is that of a married woman, gathered up in braids and richly decorated with ribbons, beads, and pearls.

== Subject's identity ==
It is uncertain how closely the painting resembles Simonetta Vespucci, particularly since if it is a portrait of her, it is posthumous, having been painted about 14 years after her death. When she died, Piero di Cosimo was only 14 years old, so it is possible that it could be a copy of a work by an earlier artist.

The Musée Condé questions the identification of the subject, titling the painting Portrait of a woman, said to be of Simonetta Vespucci, and stating that the inscription of her name at the bottom of the painting may have been added at a later date.
