= Perseus Freeing Andromeda =

Painting by Piero di Cosimo

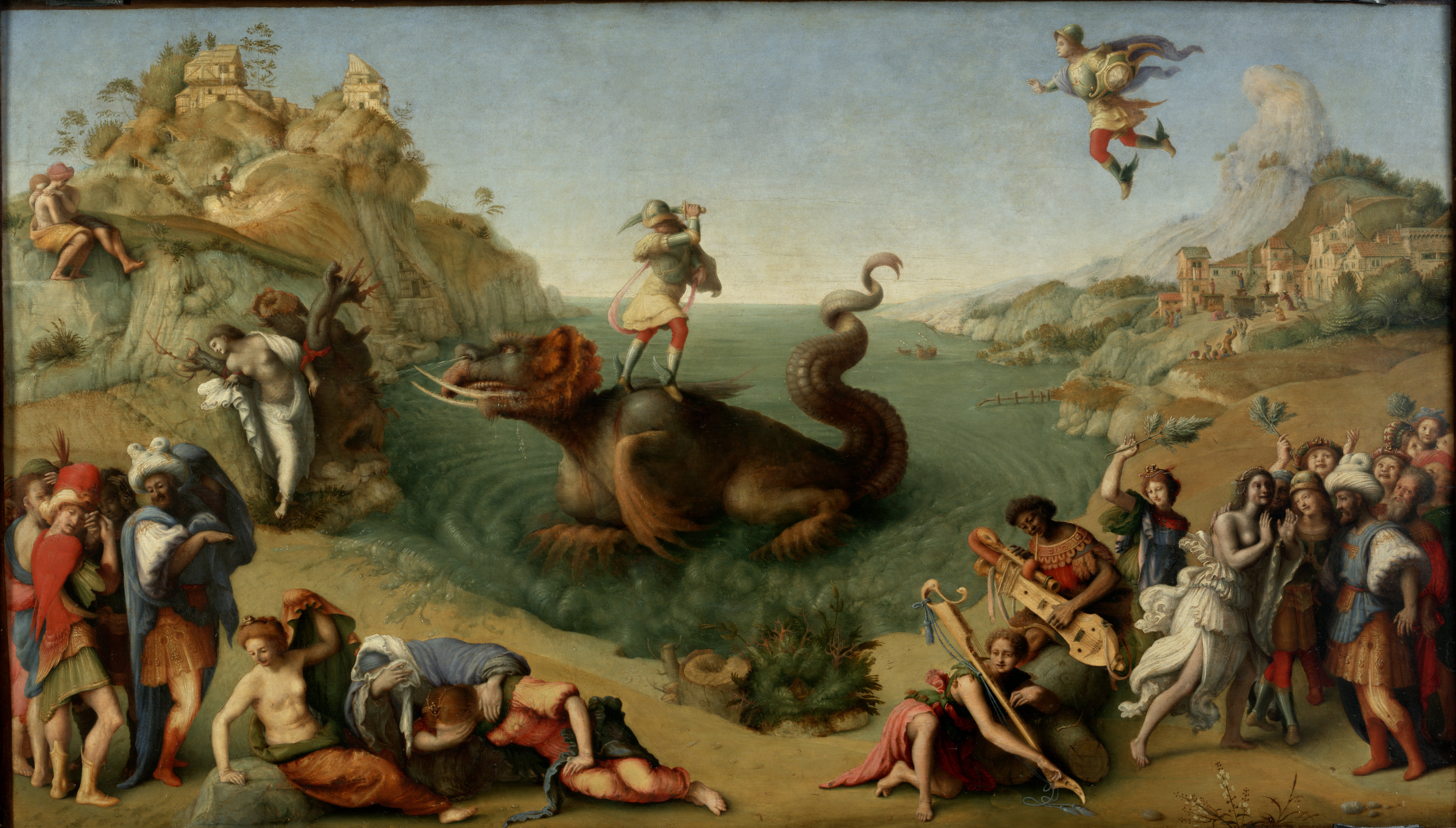
- Artist: Piero di Cosimo
- Year: 1510 or 1513
- Medium: Oil
- Dimensions: 28 in × 48 in (71 cm × 122 cm)
- Location: Uffizi, Florence

Perseus Freeing Andromeda or Liberation of Andromeda is a painting created by Piero di Cosimo, during the Italian Renaissance. The painting was praised by critics and art historians for its aesthetic, cosmological and political implications. The painting is a recreation of the myth of Perseus, the demi-god, who slays the sea monster and saves the beautiful Andromeda. The painting is based on a story created by the ancient Roman writer Ovid, in the Metamorphoses. The themes of the painting include platonic love, ideal beauty, marriage, and natural beauty. The painting includes portraits of the Medici family and many of Florentine's elite upper ruling class as characters in the story of Perseus Freeing Andromeda. The painting also represents a paragone between painting and sculpture. The painting resides in the Uffizi in Florence.

== Mythological source ==
The story behind this painting is that of the demi-god, Perseus, and Andromeda. Perseus was prophesied to kill Acrisus, King of Argos. Because of this prediction, Acrisus sends Danae, mother of Perseus, to be imprisoned, to keep her a virgin. However, Jupiter appears before her, in prison and impregnates her with Perseus, who is born a demi-god, with his mother being human and father being a God, Jupiter. After Perseus is born he is imprisoned in a box with his mother and thrown into the ocean. They stay in the box for 19 days, eventually they are rescued by fishermen, both are alive. Perseus is raised on a nearby island and knows nothing about his past, one day the king of the island hosts a feast, during this feast Perseus insults him and the king tells him that if he wishes to stay alive he must bring him the head of the Medusa. After Perseus kills Medusa, on his way back home he spots Andromeda and her mother tied to a rock, and he flies down and slays the sea monster, rescuing Andromeda. Perseus eventually marries Andromeda The painting is based on a story in the Metamorphoses, written by the ancient Roman writer, Ovid.

== Iconography ==
Andromeda is seen as the ideal sculptural beauty. She is sometimes rendered as statue-like in paintings representing this myth. The painting of Andromeda on the side of the mountain about to be consumed by the sea monster, represents ideal beauty. Andromeda seems so still and beautiful that she appeared to be a sculpture, until her hair moves from the wind. Then Perseus realizes she is actually a real person. The symbolism of Perseus freeing Andromeda is also a representation of platonic love in contrast to Phineus who is turned to stone because of his lust for Andromeda. Medusa additionally represents voluptuousness and temptations.

== Theme ==
One of the themes of the painting relates to marriage. The painting of Perseus Freeing Andromeda demonstrates that love triumphs over all things; because of Perseus's love for Andromeda. It even triumphs over monsters and human rivals. Perseus Freeing Andromeda also alludes to marriage, because the demi-god asks for Andromeda's hand in marriage. The scene of when Perseus lends his hands to be held by Andromeda, represents tactile sensuality and naturalistic beauty. The story of Perseus freeing Andromeda is a story of nature and the ideal beauty of sculpture since artists later compared the relationship between natural beauty and the ideal beauty of sculpture. The sculptures of Perseus Freeing Andromeda shows the perfection of the sculptural medium and the life likeness of paintings. The paragone of sculpture and painting during the Renaissance is evident in the painting, Perseus Freeing Andromeda. There are two sides to the paragone argument; painters say painting is more powerful because it uses lots of color and is able to show the lucid quality of drapery, something that a sculpture cannot. The other side to the argument is that of the sculptors. Sculptors say that paintings can not show the subject from all 360 degrees like a sculpture can be. This comparison, between painting and sculpture, was a step towards the modern system of fine arts. It was an argument of what was the better system for arriving at the goal of all art, which is imitation of the natural world, of which God was the greatest creator. When Perseus first sees Andromeda, bound by ropes and about to be eaten by the sea monster, destined to be her destroyer, Perseus thought she was a statue. Only the fact that her hair was moved by the breeze of the wind, did he realize she was not just a sculpture but a real person, and he immediately fell in love with her. This shows how sculpture can be considered the perfect art form.

== Historical context ==
The painting has been praised by art historians and art critics because it possesses aesthetics, cosmological and political implications. It also accurately depicts the classical stories by focusing on the theme of beauty. In terms of political characteristics, the painting contains many contemporary dignitaries such as Filippo Strozzi the Younger and Lorenzo de' Medici, future Duke of Urbino. Strozzi is depicted as the man with a white turban on the right hand corner of the painting. He is supposed to be Ceppheus. Lorenzo de' Medici's portrait is supposed to be Perseus. Piero di Cosimo signs the painting by putting himself in it as the elderly man facing the viewer. The depiction of the sea monster, in the painting, is an allusion to the return of the Medici household to power in Florence. Giorgio Vasari praised the painting for its beautiful use of color and for the depiction of an original sea monster in a way that no one in the past has done.

=== Current location ===
The painting is currently displayed in The Galleria Degli Uffizi, in Florence. In the Uffizi gallery, The painting is placed in an area that recounts the Renaissance time of debate about the strengths of painting verses sculpture. In this Gallery there are many sculptures and the placement of Perseus Freeing Andromeda adds to the argument of whether painting is a more powerful art form than sculpture.
