= Immaculate Conception with Saints (Piero di Cosimo) =

Painting by Piero di Cosimo

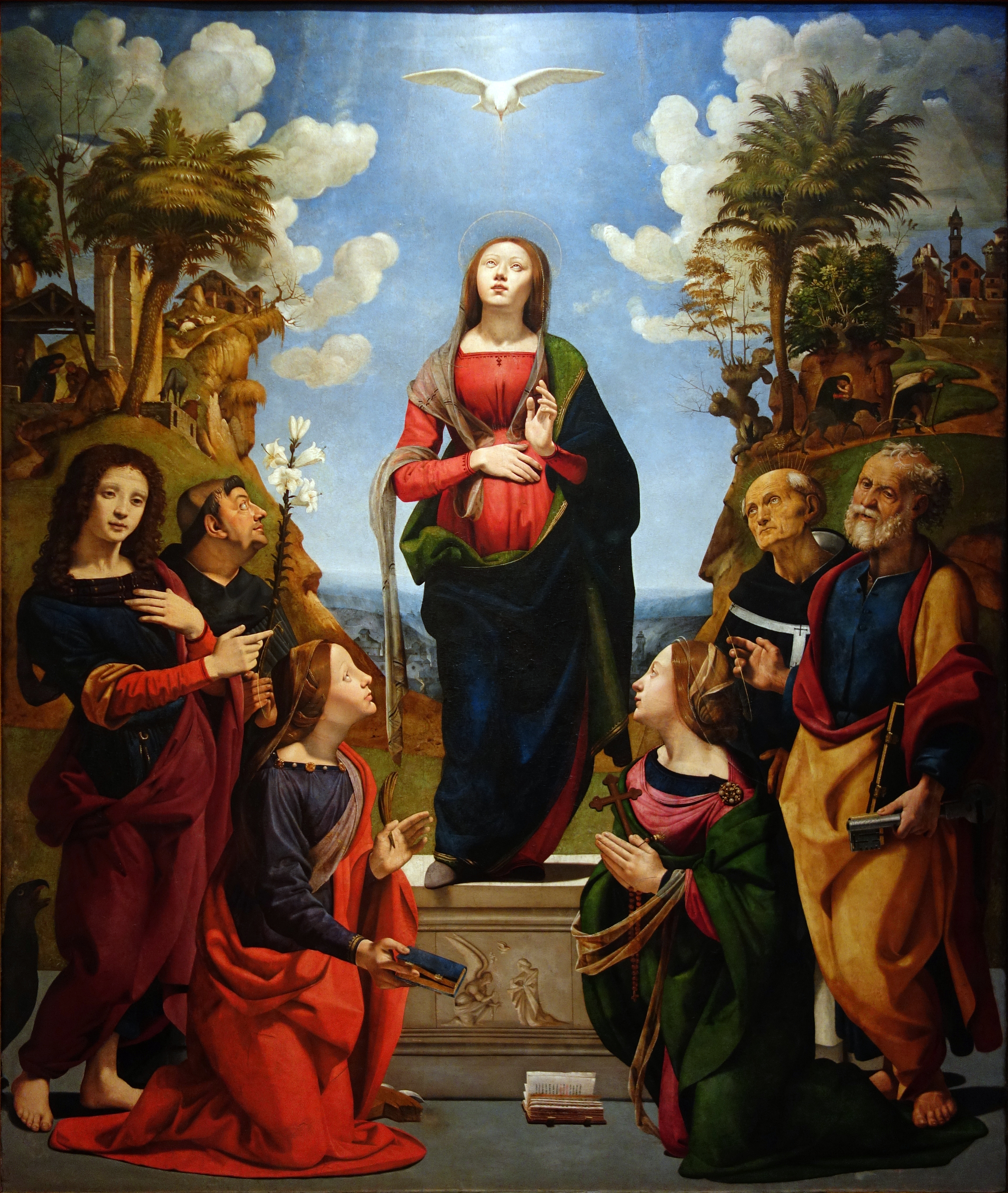
- Artist: Piero di Cosimo
- Year: between 1485 and 1505
- Medium: Oil on panel
- Subject: Immaculate Conception
- Dimensions: 206 cm × 172 cm (81 in × 68 in)
- Location: Uffizi, Florence

The Immaculate Conception with Saints (also known as The Incarnation of Jesus) is a painting by the Italian Renaissance painter Piero di Cosimo, executed between 1485 and 1505. It is housed in the Uffizi Gallery of Florence, Italy.

The painting was executed for the Tebaldi Chapel in the church of the Annunziata of Florence, and was acquired by Cardinal Leopoldo de' Medici in 1670. It was moved to the Uffizi in 1804.

The work shows the Virgin in a central and illuminated position, with a dove hovering above her head. She is flanked by the Saints John the Evangelist, Philip Benizi, Catherine (kneeling on the left), Margaret (kneeling on the right), Antoninus and Peter. In the background is a typical Piero's landscape, with two hills characterized by rock with human and beast appearance, where the other scenes of the Adoration of the Magi, the Annunciation to the Shepherds on the left and the Flight to Egypt on the right are depicted.

== Sources ==
- Fossi, Gloria (2001). Galleria degli Uffizi - Arte storia collezioni. Giunti. p. 202.
