= St Mary Magdalene (Piero di Cosimo) =

Painting by Piero di Cosimo

St Mary Magdalene Reading
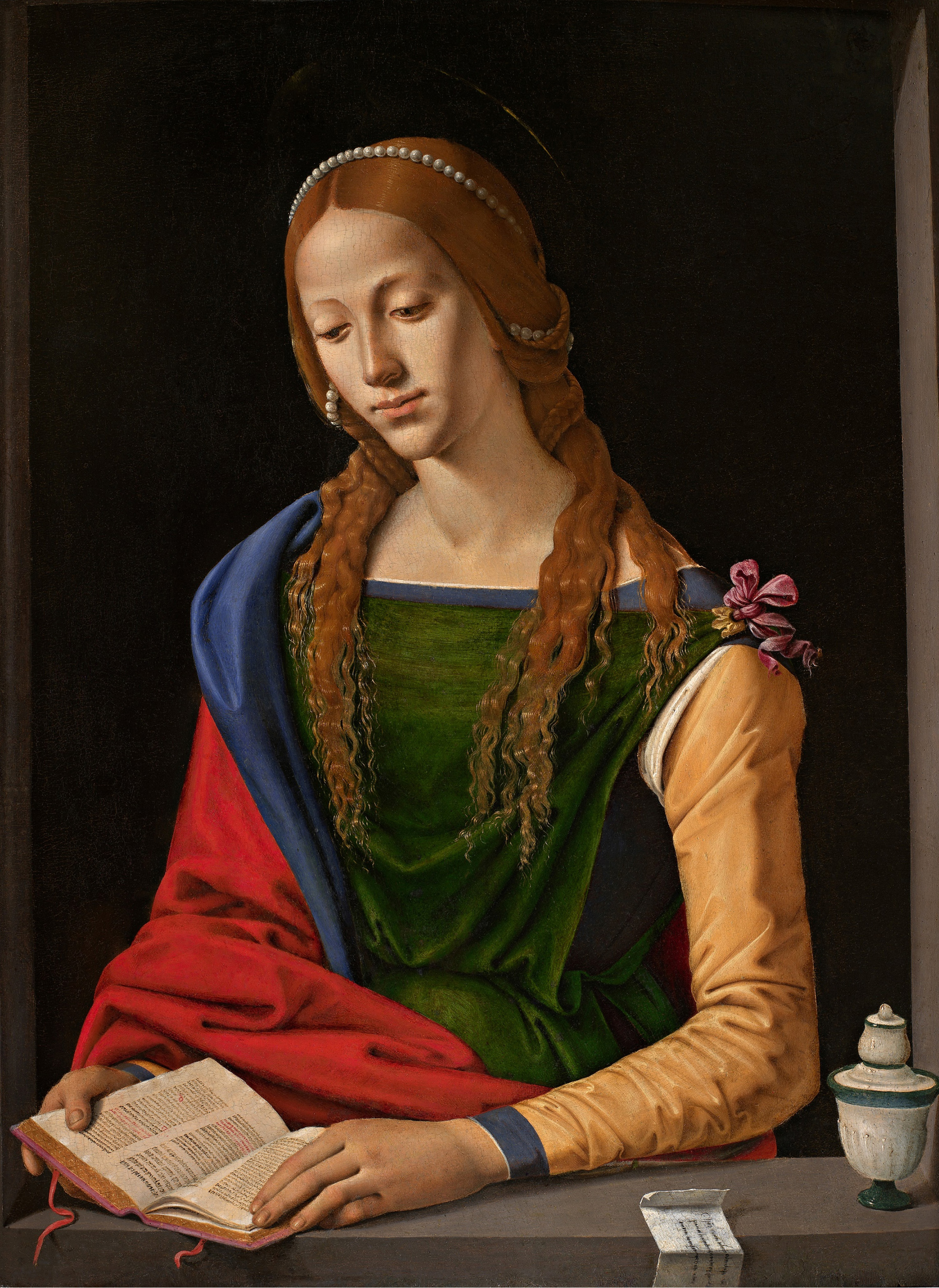
- Artist: Piero di Cosimo
- Year: between 1490 and 1495
- Medium: Painted on Wood
- Dimensions: 76 cm × 72.5 cm (30 in × 28.5 in)
- Location: Galleria Nazionale d'Arte Antica; Rome

St Mary Magdalene Reading is a painting by the Italian Renaissance painter Piero di Cosimo. It is housed in the Galleria Nazionale d'Arte Antica of Palazzo Barberini, Rome.

== Description ==
The work depicts Mary Magdalene at a window-like table, reading a bible. She is dressed in a contemporary multicolor gown and cape; she is identifiable as the Magdalen by her long slightly curled hair draping over her shoulders and the bottle of unguent on the shelf beside her. She wears a ring of pearls in her hair. Around her hair a filigree of a halo. On the sill is the painter's signature. The use of shadows to give dimension to the face, and the settled pose of the Magdalen, identify the work as emerging from Piero di Cosimo's late works, influence by Leonardo da Vinci. The intended patron of the work is not identified. Mary Magdalen paintings were sometimes desired by individuals bearing the name, however, there were also monasteries dedicated to fallen women which were often dedicated to this saint.
