= The Myth of Prometheus (Piero di Cosimo) =

Paintings by Piero di Cosimo

Prometheus Fashioning the First Man
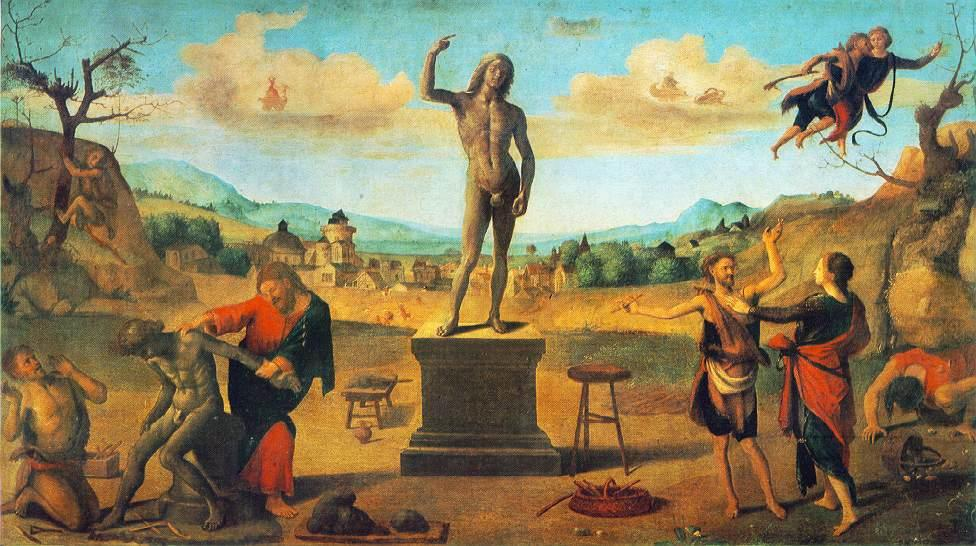
- Artist: Piero di Cosimo
- Year: 1515
- Medium: Oil on panel
- Dimensions: 68 cm × 120 cm (27 in × 47 in)
- Location: Alte Pinakothek, Munich

The Theft of Fire and the Punishment of Prometheus
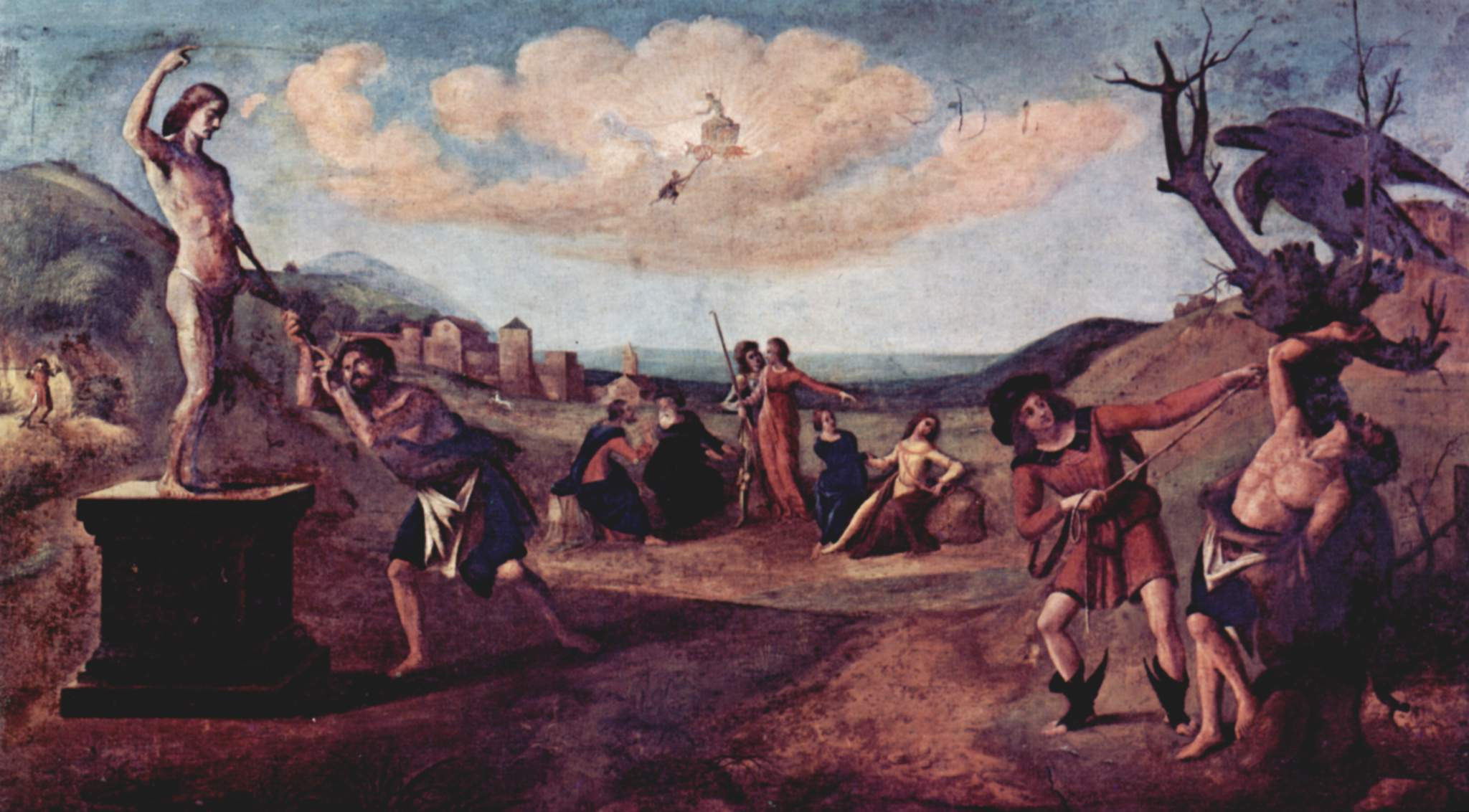
- Artist: Piero di Cosimo
- Year: 1515
- Medium: Oil on panel
- Dimensions: 64 cm × 116 cm (25 in × 46 in)
- Location: Musée des Beaux-Arts, Strasbourg

The Myth of Prometheus, also known as The Story of Prometheus, is a series of two panels painted by Piero di Cosimo, executed in 1515. They depict Prometheus standing before a life-size statue.

== Subject ==
Two paintings by Piero di Cosimo with the same title of "The Myth of Prometheus" are known to exist.

The first of the two Prometheus paintings, which is also known as Prometheus Fashioning the First Man, is held at Alte Pinakothek in Munich. The Munich version depicts a central statue among other activities in the painting.

The second of the two Prometheus paintings, which is also known as The Theft of Fire and the Punishment of Prometheus, is held at the Musée des Beaux-Arts in Strasbourg. The Strasbourg version depicts a statue addressed by Prometheus on the left side of the canvas, with other activities depicted elsewhere on the canvas with equal prominence, including a dark bird on the right side of the canvas apparently the symbolic of the eternal torment of Prometheus as recorded in mythological sources.

== Analysis ==
Erwin Panofsky in his book, Studies in Iconography commented on the painting of Prometheus in comparison to paintings about Vulcan (mythology) and the theme of human development of primitive mankind to civilized mankind stating: "...represent the myth of Prometheus and Epimetheus. In both cases the imagination of the artist is centered around the 'Awakening of Humanity,' and in both cases the stimulus of this awakening is fire," (p. 50).
