= The Death of Procris =

Unsigned painting

A Satyr mourning over a Nymph
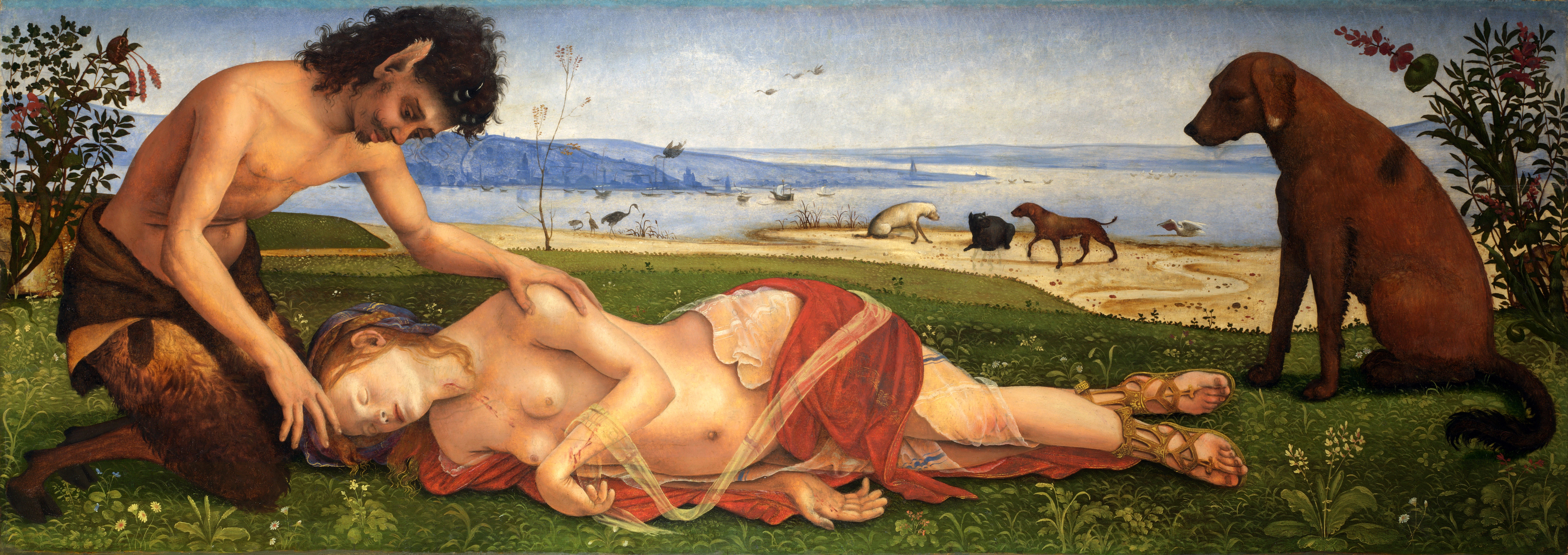
- Artist: Piero di Cosimo
- Year: circa 1495
- Type: Oil on poplar
- Dimensions: 65.4 cm × 184.2 cm (25.7 in × 72.5 in)
- Location: National Gallery; London

The Death of Procris, A Satyr mourning over a Nymph or simply A Mythological Subject are names given to an unsigned, undated panel painting in the National Gallery in London, United Kingdom, securely attributed to Piero di Cosimo (who never signed his works). Its date is uncertain, and its subject has been a matter of dispute. The name The Death of Procris (Italian: Morte di Procri) has been used since the 19th century, and is supposed to have been inspired by Ovid's tale of the death of Procris at the hands of her husband Cephalus, in Metamorphoses VII. The National Gallery has rejected this title since at least Cecil Gould's catalogue of 1951, preferring to describe the subject as "A Mythological Subject" or "A Satyr mourning over a Nymph".

Despite the uncertainty surrounding the subject matter, the painting, which shows a satyr mourning over the body of a young woman, has been one of the most popular works by Piero di Cosimo. Erwin Panofsky was mesmerized by the "strange lure emanating from the picture", and other commentators have admired its "hazy atmosphere of a waking dream".

== A lesson for the newlyweds ==
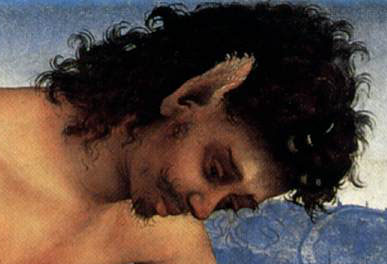
Detail of the mourning faun

Piero's interest in the story of Procris might have been occasioned by one of the first Italian plays based on a mythological subject, Niccolò da Correggio's Cefalo, which had its premiere at a wedding feast in the Castello Estense (21 January 1487) and was printed in Venice in 1507. The story is supposed to have been adapted from Plautus rather than Ovid's Metamorphoses and, in contrast to earlier treatments of the story, it ends happily. If so, the painting should be read as a warning to the newlyweds against the dangers of jealousy which brought about the death of Procris.

The association with the theme of marriage is reinforced by the painting's unusual dimensions which suggest it was intended for the front of a cassone, or bridal chest. Gould suggests that although it has often been described as a cassone front, as most Florentine paintings of similar dimensions are, it is possible that it served a different purpose, and may have been designed to be set in wainscoting. Fermor also finds it plausible that the painting hung in the marital chamber.

The upper part of the painting bears the artist's fingerprints. On the back of the panel are a card and a seal with the stemma of the Guicciardini (which may have been a later addition). There is also a drawing interpreted as the frame of a pilaster.

== Alchemical symbolism ==
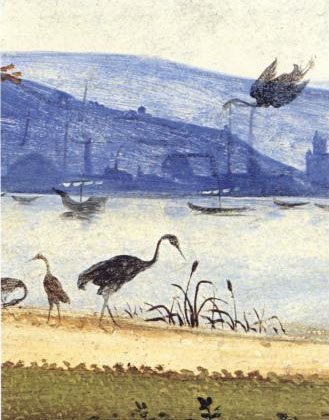
A river landscape in the background

Considering the alchemist background of Cosimo Rosselli (the painter's teacher and father-in-law), it has been suggested that the painting "can be explained in terms of the pictorial language of alchemy". According to this conceit, the dog (whose form is visually echoed by three other dogs in the background) represents none other than Hermes Trismegistos, and a tree shown growing over Procris's breast symbolises the arbor philosophica. The red-and-gold veil of the victim is seen as symbolic of the "red-hot" philosopher's stone, and the entire composition allegedly represents the alchemist's longed-for victory over death.

== Inconsistencies ==
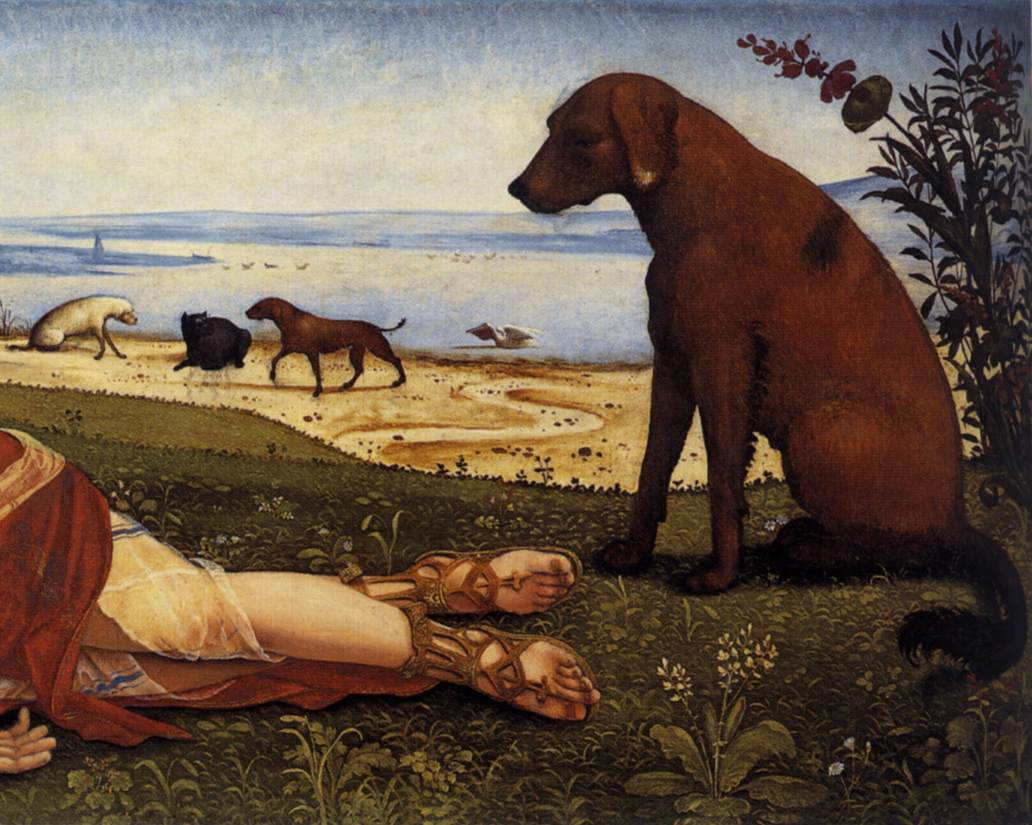
Laelaps

The subject matter lends itself to various levels of interpretation, prompting Dennis Geronimus to comment on some "mounting inconsistencies" of the painting with the Procris myth, such as the absence of her husband, the deadly spear and the unusual location of her wounds. Most conspicuously, the woman is mourned by a faun rather than her husband. The creature is absent from Ovid's story, but is featured in Correggio's play where it acts "as the fatal meddler".

Another controversial figure is the dog looking at the scene. It is tempting to interpret it as Laelaps, the transparent symbol of Procris's fidelity to her jealous husband. By Ovid's account, Laelaps and the Teumessian fox had been turned into stone earlier in the story, so the identity of the dog remains problematic. The river in the distance may be one of the three rivers of the Underworld.

== Sources ==
- Gould, Cecil (1975). The Sixteenth Century Italian Schools. London: National Gallery Catalogues. ISBN 0-947645-22-5.
- Potterton, Homan. The National Gallery. Thames and Hudson, 1977.
