= 1973 in science fiction =

The year 1973 was marked, in science fiction, by the following:

== Events ==
- The first volume of the journal Science Fiction Studies is published.
- The 31st annual Worldcon, Torcon II, is held in Toronto, Canada

== Births and deaths ==
=== Births ===
- Max Barry

== Literary releases ==
=== Novels ===
- Gravity's Rainbow, by Thomas Pynchon
- Japan Sinks, by Sakyo Komatsu
- A Scanner Darkly, by Philip K. Dick

=== Short stories ===
- "The Ones Who Walk Away from Omelas", by Ursula K. Le Guin
- "The Women Men Don't See", by James Tiptree, Jr.

=== Children's books ===
- A Wind in the Door, by Madeleine L'Engle

== Movies ==
- Fantastic Planet, dir. by René Laloux
- Sleeper, dir. by Woody Allen
- Soylent Green, dir. by Richard Fleischer
- Westworld, written and dir. by Michael Crichton

== Television ==
- Moonbase 3
- The Six Million Dollar Man
- The Starlost

== Video games ==
- Space Race

== Other Media ==
- Triplanetary - board game

== Awards ==
=== Hugos ===
- Best novel: The Gods Themselves, by Isaac Asimov
- Best novella: The Word for World is Forest, by Ursula K. Le Guin
- Best novelette: "Goat Song", by Poul Anderson
- Best short story: "Eurema's Dam", by R. A. Lafferty and "The Meeting" by Frederik Pohl and C. M. Kornbluth (tie)
- Best dramatic presentation: Slaughterhouse-Five, dir. by George Roy Hill; screenplay by Stephen Geller; based on the novel by Kurt Vonnegut
- Best professional editor: Ben Bova
- Best professional artist: Frank Kelly Freas
- Best fanzine: Energumen, ed. by Michael Glicksohn and Susan Wood Glicksohn
- Best fan writer: Terry Carr
- Best fan artist: Tim Kirk

=== Nebulas ===
- Best novel: Rendezvous with Rama, by Arthur C. Clarke
- Best novella: The Death of Doctor Island, by Gene Wolfe
- Best novelette: "Of Mist, and Grass, and Sand", by Vonda N. McIntyre
- Best short story: "Love is the Plan the Plan is Death", by James Tiptree, Jr.
- Best Dramatic Presentation: Soylent Green, script by Stanley R. Greenberg

=== Other awards ===
- BSFA Award for Best Novel: Rendezvous with Rama, by Arthur C. Clarke
- Saturn Award for Best Science Fiction Film: Soylent Green
