= 31st World Science Fiction Convention =

31st Worldcon (1973)

Torcon II, the 31st World Science Fiction Convention
- Genre: Science fiction
- Dates: 31 August–3 September 1973
- Venue: Royal York Hotel
- Location: Toronto, Ontario
- Country: Canada
- Attendance: ~2,900
- Filing status: non-profit

The 31st World Science Fiction Convention (Worldcon), also known as Torcon II, was held on 31 August–3 September 1973 at the Royal York Hotel in Toronto, Ontario, Canada.

The chairman was John Millard.

== Participants ==
Attendance was approximately 2,900.

=== Guests of Honour ===
- Robert Bloch (pro)
- William Rotsler (fan)
- Lester del Rey (toastmaster)

== Awards ==
The World Science Fiction Society administers and presents the Hugo Awards, the oldest and most noteworthy award for science fiction. Selection of the recipients is by vote of the Worldcon members. Categories include novels and short fiction, artwork, dramatic presentations, and various professional and fandom activities.

Other awards may be presented at Worldcon at the discretion of the individual convention committee. This has often included the national SF awards of the host country, such as the Japanese Seiun Awards as part of Nippon 2007, and the Prix Aurora Awards as part of Anticipation in 2009. The Astounding Award for Best New Writer and the Sidewise Award, though not sponsored by the Worldcon, are usually presented, as well as the Chesley Awards, the Prometheus Award, and others. In 2021, the Nommo Awards began presenting at Worldcon.

=== 1973 Hugo Awards ===
- Best Novel: The Gods Themselves by Isaac Asimov
- Best Novella: The Word for World is Forest by Ursula K. Le Guin
- Best Novelette: "Goat Song" by Poul Anderson
- Best Short Story:
  - "Eurema's Dam" by R. A. Lafferty and
  - "The Meeting" by Frederik Pohl and Cyril M. Kornbluth (tie)
- Best Dramatic Presentation: Slaughterhouse-Five
- Best Professional Editor: Ben Bova
- Best Professional Artist: Frank Kelly Freas
- Best Amateur Magazine: Energumen edited by Mike Glicksohn and Susan Wood Glicksohn
- Best Fan Writer: Terry Carr
- Best Fan Artist: Tim Kirk

=== Other awards ===
The 31st Worldcon was the first one in which the John W. Campbell Award for Best New Writer was awarded.

- Special Award: Pierre Versins for L'Encyclopedie de l'Utopie et de la science fiction
- John W. Campbell Award for Best New Writer: Jerry Pournelle

== See also ==
- Hugo Award
- Science fiction
- Speculative fiction
- World Science Fiction Society
- Worldcon

| Preceded by 30th World Science Fiction Convention; L.A.Con I in Los Angeles, California, United States (1972) | List of Worldcons; 31st World Science Fiction Convention; Torcon II in Toronto, Ontario, Canada (1973) | Succeeded by 32nd World Science Fiction Convention; Discon II in Washington, D.C., United States (1974) |
