= 1975 in science fiction =

The year 1975 was marked, in science fiction, by the following:

== Events ==
- The 33rd annual Worldcon, Aussiecon, is held in Melbourne, Australia

== Births and deaths ==
=== Deaths ===
- James Blish
- Miriam Allen deFord
- Murray Leinster
- Rod Serling

== Literary releases ==
=== Novels ===
- Dhalgren, by Samuel R. Delany
- The Female Man, by Joanna Russ
- Midworld, by Alan Dean Foster
- Venus on the Half-Shell, by Philip Jose Farmer (writing as Kilgore Trout)

=== Short stories ===
- "The Chaste Planet", by John Updike, pub. in The New Yorker
- "The Lawnmower Man", by Stephen King, pub. in Cavalier

=== Anthologies ===
- The New Atlantis, ed. by Robert Silverberg

=== Comics ===
- Doomsday + 1 by Joe Gill and John Byrne

== Movies ==
- A Boy and His Dog, dir. by L.Q. Jones
- Death Race 2000, dir. by Paul Bartel
- Rollerball, dir. by Norman Jewison

== Television ==
- Reideen the Brave
- Space: 1999
- Survivors

== Other media ==
- Mothership Connection, album by Parliament

== Awards ==
=== Hugos ===
- Best novel: The Dispossessed, by Ursula K. Le Guin
- Best novella: A Song for Lya, by George R. R. Martin
- Best novelette: "Adrift Just Off the Islets of Langerhans", by Harlan Ellison
- Best short story: "The Hole Man" by Larry Niven
- Best dramatic presentation: Young Frankenstein, dir. by Mel Brooks; screenplay by Gene Wilder and Mel Brooks; based on the characters in the novel Frankenstein, by Mary Wollstonecraft Shelley
- Best professional editor: Ben Bova
- Best professional artist: Frank Kelly Freas
- Best fanzine: The Alien Critic, ed. by Richard E. Geis
- Best fan writer: Richard E. Geis
- Best fan artist: William Rotsler

=== Nebulas ===
- Best novel: The Forever War, by Joe Haldeman
- Best novella: Home is the Hangman, by Roger Zelazny
- Best novelette: "San Diego Lightfoot Sue", by Tom Reamy
- Best short story: "Catch That Zeppelin!", by Fritz Lieber

=== Other awards ===
- BSFA Award for Best Novel: Orbitsville, by Bob Shaw
- Saturn Award for Best Science Fiction Film: Rollerball
