= Granfalloon (fanzine) =

Science fiction publication

Granfalloon was a science fiction fanzine published by Linda Bushyager. It was nominated twice for the Hugo Award for Best Fanzine in 1972 and 1973 (though losing to Locus and Energumen respectively).

Contributors included Piers Anthony, Alicia Austin, Bill Bowers, Ron Bushyager, Grant Canfield, Don D'Ammassa, Steve Fabian, Alexis Gilliland, Mike Glicksohn, Terry Jeeves, Arnie Katz, Tim Kirk, Damon Knight, Frank Lunney, Sandra Miesel, Ron Miller, Andrew J. Offutt, Andrew I. Porter, Bill Rotsler, Robert Silverberg, Darrell Schweitzer, Mae Strelkov, Bob Tucker, Harry Warner, Jr., Ted White, Susan Wood and Roger Zelazny.

Suzanne Tompkins went on to publish the fanzine The Spanish Inquisition with Jerry Kaufman in the 1970s.
