= Tom Reamy =

American writer (1935-1977)

- Tom Reamy in the mid-1970s
- Born: Thomas Earl Reamy; January 23, 1935; Woodson, Texas, US
- Died: November 4, 1977 (aged 42); Independence, Missouri, US

Tom Reamy (January 23, 1935 – November 4, 1977) was an American science fiction and fantasy author, and a key figure in 1960s and 1970s science fiction fandom. He died at age 42 prior to the publication of his first novel; his work is primarily dark fantasy.

== Fan, editor, convention organizer ==
Thomas Earl Reamy was born in Woodson, Texas during the Great Depression. While still in his teens in the early 1950s, Reamy became active in science fiction fandom's fanzine and convention culture, as both a fan writer and fan artist. During this period, Reamy began to experiment with writing fantasy and science fiction stories. He was never quite satisfied with or confident enough to submit his stories to the editors of the professional genre magazines of the era, despite encouragement from friends and others who felt he had talent; Reamy continued to hone his writing for many years, while exploring other expressions for his growing creativity.

Reamy, along with transplanted Texan Orville W. Mosher, founded the first organized science fiction fan club in Texas: The Dallas Futurian Society (DFS), so named after the earlier New York Futurians. The DFS was founded in late fall of 1953 when Reamy was 18, and the club was continually active until July 6, 1958, when it expired in a colorful fashion. During that five-year period, Mosher and Reamy traded off editing the club's fanzine CriFanAc, (a fandom term for Critical Fan Activity), attracting a variety of contributors, both local and from greater science fiction fandom; Reamy became its sole editor with its sixth issue. He had been contributing both artwork and commentary to its pages, as he was also doing to other science fiction fanzines of the era.

With fellow Dallas Futurians James and Gregory Benford, Reamy organized the first science fiction convention held in Texas. A rotating city and state regional convention of the era, Southwesterncon's sixth incarnation was held in Dallas on the weekend of July 5, 1958, concluding the next day, July 6; the professional guest of honor was new writer and well-known fan Marion Zimmer Bradley, who by then had replaced Fredric Brown. Longtime science fiction fan personality, collector, and literary agent Forrest J Ackerman came from Los Angeles and served at the convention's banquet as toastmaster. On the last day of the convention, the members of the Dallas Futurian Society disbanded their club as part of Southwestercon VI's business meeting. During that meeting, Reamy proposed a motion that club co-founder Orville W. Mosher, the man behind much of the club's behind-the-scenes intrigue and politics during its final years, be elected by consensus their new president. Just moments later, the same Dallas Futurian Society voted on another Reamy motion, to officially disband itself forever; the motion passed, despite objections from Mosher. He was never heard from again.

During the mid-to-late 1960s, while working as a technical illustrator for aerospace contractor Collins Radio at their Dallas branch, Reamy became the editor and publisher of Trumpet, a slickly produced, professionally printed fanzine (the norm for the era was to use the much less expensive ditto or mimeograph reproduction for fanzines). Between 1965 and 1969, 10 issues appeared, the later issues having full-color front covers. In 1966, Trumpet received enough nominations for inclusion on that year's final Hugo Awards ballot; it was later ruled as being ineligible because it failed to meet the Hugo's minimum number of published issues requirement needed for nomination. In 1967 and then again in 1969, Trumpet made it on the final ballot in the Best Fanzine category for science fiction's Hugo Award.

In the late 1960s, Reamy also organized and became chairman of Dallas fandom's long-running "Big D in '73" bid to host the 31st World Science Fiction Convention. He also edited and designed the bid's official publication, The Dallascon Bulletin, which, like Trumpet, used photo-offset printing. Nothing like them had been produced by previous Worldcon bidders. Each issue's appearance polarized strong support for or against the Texas bid, due to its widespread, free circulation to 6000+, and the large amount of paid advertising each issue carried. As a result, the Texans were sometimes accused of trying to buy a win for the Dallas bid. Ultimately, the long-running Dallascon bid collapsed for complex reasons unrelated to this controversy, several months before 1973's site-selection vote was taken at Noreascon, the 1971 Worldcon in Boston. As a result, the Toronto bid won the 31st Worldcon, becoming Torcon II.

Early in the 1970s, Reamy became one of the founders of the Dallas area's Turkey City Writer's Workshop. Many new Texas genre writers emerged from this workshop, eventually giving birth in 1976 to the all-Texas original speculative fiction hardcover anthology, Lone Star Universe; the workshop continues to this day.

Reamy's high-profile Worldcon bid in science fiction fandom and its Dallascon Bulletin had a lasting impact: These and Reamy's ten issues of Trumpet inspired the formation on July 3, 1971, of the still-ongoing Kansas City Science Fiction and Fantasy Society (KaCSFFS) and several year's later, Kansas City's bid for the 1976 Worldcon. Many of Dallas' "Big Bid" concepts were adopted by KC and used in its multi-level bidding strategy. Reamy joined the KC bid at chairman Ken Keller's request, shortly before their victory in 1974, filling two key department head positions on the convention committee. The ill-fated "Big D in '73" bid was reborn in Kansas City as "KC in '76." Kansas City went on to win their Worldcon bid at Discon 2, held during Labor Day weekend 1974.

Following his move to KC in the late summer of 1974, Reamy retired Trumpet and began publishing the similar Nickelodeon. There, with new business partner Ken Keller, he started a typesetting and graphic design business, Nickelodeon Graphics Arts Service. Together, they created the publications division for KC's now official MidAmeriCon, the 34th World Science Fiction Convention. Reamy immediately established a strong editorial style and modern graphic design approach to the convention's progress reports and other publications. That included a first: a full-sized, hardcover program book, a concept left over from the old Dallascon bid. All of this had a permanent influence on all Worldcon publications that followed. Reamy was also the department head of the convention's ambitious film program department that developed another first: a comprehensive, 80-hour, all 35mm science fiction film retrospective within a World Science Fiction Convention. The concept included a movie theater-style concessions area that offered freshly popped popcorn, selections of soda, and candies.

== Published writer ==
In the early 1970s, having honed his writing craft quietly for many years, Reamy felt confident enough to begin submitting his fiction to the genre's magazines and original short story anthologies; his work began selling almost immediately, the first two stories being bought on the very same day. Thirteen stories of various lengths and one novel were completed before his untimely death.

Reamy's only novel Blind Voices, published posthumously in both hardcover and mass-market paperback editions, earned critical comparisons with the works of Richard Matheson, Ray Bradbury, and Harlan Ellison. The novel deals with the arrival of a strange and wonderful “freak show” at a rural town in Kansas during the 1920s and its effects on the lives of the residents. While not quite as polished as those authors’ works (there was some question as to whether Reamy intended another polish draft of the novel), critics regarded Blind Voices as an exceptional first novel, causing both fans and critics to ponder how important a figure he could have become if he had lived.

Other than Blind Voices, the only other Tom Reamy book is a posthumous collection of his shorter fiction, San Diego Lightfoot Sue and Other Stories, also published in both hardcover and mass-market paperback. The volume has an insightful introduction, "Embrace the Departing Shadow," by Harlan Ellison, surveying Reamy's stories and his short career before his death). The story "San Diego Lightfoot Sue" won the 1975 Nebula Award for Best Novelette, and was a finalist for the 1976 Hugo Award for Best Novelette.

== Death ==
Tom Reamy died on November 4, 1977, at age 42 while at his home in Independence, Missouri. He was found dead from a heart attack, slumped over his typewriter seven pages into a new, untitled story for editor Edward L. Ferman at The Magazine of Fantasy & Science Fiction. He was laid to rest in Woodson Cemetery in Woodson, Texas, where other members of the Reamy family were interred. Prior to his death, Reamy and artist George Barr had begun working again on their graphic novel The Broken Sword, an adaptation of Poul Anderson's fantasy novel of the same name, which had begun appearing a decade before in the pages of Reamy's Trumpet; the project languished after his untimely death.

== Published works ==
- Novels:
  - Blind Voices (1978)
- Collections:
  - San Diego Lightfoot Sue and Other Stories (1979)
  - Under the Hollywood Sign (2023)
- Short stories:
  - "Jenny's Friends" (1954)
  - "Beyond the C"left" (1974)
  - "Twilla" (1974)
  - "San Diego Lightfoot Sue" (1975)
  - "Under the Hollywood Sign" (1975)
  - "Dinosaurs" (1976)
  - "Mistress of Windraven" (1976)
  - "The Sweetwater Factor" (1976)
  - "The Detweiler Boy" (1977)
  - "Insects in Amber" (1978)
  - "Waiting for Billy Star" (1978)
  - "2076: Blue Eyes" (1979)
  - "M is for the Million Things" (1981)
  - "Potiphee, Petey and Me" (2023) (initially sold to the unpublished anthology The Last Dangerous Visions)
- Screenplays:
  - "The Goddaughter" (produced 1972; Reamy credited on screen as only assistant director)
  - "The Mislayed Genie" (produced 1973)
  - "Sting" (1975) (unproduced)
  - "The Screaming Night: A Screenplay" with Howard Waldrop (?) (unproduced)
- Hollywood Film Crew:
  - Served in the Art Department as property master on the cult movie "Flesh Gordon" (1974)

== Awards and nominations ==
- Hugo: Best Fanzine nominee (1967) for Trumpet
- Hugo: Best Fanzine nominee (1969) for Trumpet
- Nebula: Best Novelette nominee (1974) for "Twilla"
- Nebula: Best Novelette winner (1975) for "San Diego Lightfoot Sue"
- Hugo: Best Novelette nominee (1976) for "San Diego Lightfoot Sue"
- John W. Campbell Award for Best New Writer: winner (1976)
- Nebula: Best Novel nominee (1978) for Blind Voices
- Hugo: Best Novel nominee (1979) for Blind Voices
