= CSFFA Hall of Fame Trophy =

Canadian speculative fiction award

The Canadian SF and Fantasy Association Hall of Fame Trophy is an award given to Canadian science fiction and fantasy writers for their contributions over their entire career, and is presented as part of the Aurora Awards. The award was first given out as the Lifetime Achievement Award in 1980. Its name changed to the Hall of Fame Trophy in 2014.

== Recipients ==
CSFFA Hall of Fame Trophy Recipients
Year	Creators	Comments	Ref.
1980	A. E. van Vogt	Lifetime Achievement	
1981	Susan Wood	Lifetime Contributions to the Field of Canadian SF & Fantasy	
1982	Phyllis Gotlieb	Lifetime Contributions to the Field	
1983	Judith Merril	Lifetime Contributions to the Field	
2008	Dennis Mullin	Lifetime Contributions	
2013	Robert J. Sawyer	Lifetime Contributions	
2014	William Gibson	Hall of Fame	
2014	Spider Robinson	Hall of Fame	
2014	Jeanne Robinson	Hall of Fame	
2015	Dave Duncan	Hall of Fame	
2015	H. A. Hargreaves	Hall of Fame	
2015	Michael Coney	Hall of Fame	
2016	David Cronenberg	Hall of Fame	
2016	Guy Gavriel Kay	Hall of Fame	
2017	Charles de Lint	Hall of Fame	
2017	Élisabeth Vonarburg	Hall of Fame	
2017	Lorna Toolis	Hall of Fame	
2018	Candas Jane Dorsey	Hall of Fame	
2018	Jaymie Matthews	Hall of Fame	
2018	Robert Charles Wilson	Hall of Fame	
2019	Tanya Huff	Hall of Fame	
2019	Eileen Kernaghan	Hall of Fame	
2019	R. Graeme Cameron	Hall of Fame	
2020	Heather Dale	Hall of Fame	
2020	Cory Doctorow	Hall of Fame	
2020	Matt Hughes	Hall of Fame	
2021	Monica Hughes	Hall of Fame	
2021	Stan Hyde	Hall of Fame	
2021	Jean-Louis Trudel	Hall of Fame	
2022	Julie Czerneda	Hall of Fame	
2022	Ed Greenwood	Hall of Fame	
2022	Hayden Trenholm	Hall of Fame	
2023	Clifford Samuels	Hall of Fame	
2023	Michelle Sagara	Hall of Fame	
2023	John Robert Colombo	Hall of Fame	
2024	Nalo Hopkinson	Hall of Fame	
2024	Chris A. Hadfield	Hall of Fame	
2024	Jo Walton	Hall of Fame	
2025	Clint Budd	Hall of Fame	
2025	Charles R. Saunders	Hall of Fame	
2025	Diane L. Walton	Hall of Fame	
2026	Kelley Armstrong	Hall of Fame	
2026	James Alan Gardner	Hall of Fame	
2026	Mike Glicksohn	Hall of Fame	

== Nomination list ==
The nominees list is evaluated by the jury every year, including any received that year, and any for previous years.

Creator	Ref.
Kelley Armstrong	
Julie Czerneda	
Gordon R. Dickson	
Ed Greenwood	
Monica Hughes	
Stan Hyde	
Karl Johanson	
Hubert Rogers	
Michelle Sagara-West	
Cliff Samuels	
Karl Schroeder	
Hayden Trenholm	
Lynda Williams	
