= 32nd World Science Fiction Convention =

32nd Worldcon (1974)

Discon II, the 32nd World Science Fiction Convention
- Genre: Science fiction
- Dates: 29 August–2 September 1974
- Venue: Sheraton Park Hotel
- Location: Washington, D.C.
- Country: United States
- Attendance: 3,587
- Filing status: non-profit

The 32nd World Science Fiction Convention (Worldcon), also known as Discon II, was held on 29 August–2 September 1974 at the Sheraton Park Hotel in Washington, D.C., United States.

The official co-chairmen were Jay and Alice Haldeman; Ron Bounds was the vice-chairman.

== Participants ==
Attendance was 3,587.

=== Guests of honor ===
- Roger Zelazny (pro)
- Jay Kay Klein (fan)
- Andrew J. Offutt (toastmaster)

== Awards ==
The World Science Fiction Society administers and presents the Hugo Awards, the oldest and most noteworthy award for science fiction. Selection of the recipients is by vote of the Worldcon members. Categories include novels and short fiction, artwork, dramatic presentations, and various professional and fandom activities.

Other awards may be presented at Worldcon at the discretion of the individual convention committee. This has often included the national SF awards of the host country, such as the Japanese Seiun Awards as part of Nippon 2007, and the Prix Aurora Awards as part of Anticipation in 2009. The Astounding Award for Best New Writer and the Sidewise Award, though not sponsored by the Worldcon, are usually presented, as well as the Chesley Awards, the Prometheus Award, and others. In 2021, the Nommo Awards began presenting at Worldcon.

=== 1974 Hugo Awards ===
- Best Novel: Rendezvous with Rama by Arthur C. Clarke
- Best Novella: "The Girl Who Was Plugged In" by James Tiptree, Jr.
- Best Novelette: "The Deathbird" by Harlan Ellison
- Best Short Story: "The Ones Who Walk Away from Omelas" by Ursula K. Le Guin
- Best Dramatic Presentation: Sleeper
- Best Professional Editor: Ben Bova
- Best Professional Artist: Frank Kelly Freas
- Best Amateur Magazine (tie):
  - Algol, edited by Andy Porter
  - The Alien Critic, edited by Richard E. Geis
- Best Fan Writer: Susan Wood
- Best Fan Artist: Tim Kirk

=== Other awards ===
- John W. Campbell Award for Best New Writer (tie):
  - Spider Robinson
  - Lisa Tuttle
- Gandalf Grand Master Award: J. R. R. Tolkien

== See also ==
- Hugo Award
- Science fiction
- Speculative fiction
- World Science Fiction Society
- Worldcon

Preceded by 31st World Science Fiction Convention; Torcon II in Toronto, Ontario, Canada (1973)	List of Worldcons; 32nd World Science Fiction Convention; Discon II in Washington, D.C., United States (1974)	Succeeded by 33rd World Science Fiction Convention; Aussiecon One in Melbourne, Australia (1975)
