= Lorna Toolis =

Canadian librarian (1952–2021)

- Born: October 6, 1952; Winnipeg, Manitoba, Canada
- Died: August 11, 2021 (aged 68); Toronto, Ontario, Canada
- Occupations: Librarian, editor
- Known for: Head of the Merril Collection of Science Fiction, Speculation, and Fantasy at the Toronto Public Library, 1986-2017

Lorna Diane Toolis (October 6, 1952 – August 11, 2021) was a Canadian librarian. She was head of the Merril Collection of Science Fiction, Speculation, and Fantasy at the Toronto Public Library from 1986 to 2017. She was inducted into the Canadian Science Fiction & Fantasy Association Hall of Fame in 2017.

== Early life ==
Toolis was born in Winnipeg, Manitoba, and raised in Transcona, the daughter of Robert Toolis and Shirley Setter Toolis. She earned a bachelor's degree in history at the University of Winnipeg, and a master's degree in library science at the University of Alberta.

== Career ==
=== Alberta ===
While studying in Alberta, Toolis was a member of the Edmonton Science Fiction and Comic Arts Society, contributed to the group's cookbook, Stir Wars, and edited its newsletter, Neology. She was one of the early organizers of Noncon, the Edmonton-based science fiction fan convention. After earning her degree, she was head of technical services at the library of the Northern Alberta Institute of Technology.

=== The Spaced Out Library/Merril Collection ===
1986, Toolis was appointed head of the Spaced Out Library (SOL), the science fiction collection at Toronto Public Library. The collection was built around an initial donation of about 5000 items, given by writer Judith Merril. Beginning in 1987, she published SOL Rising, a bi-annual zine for the Friends of the Merril Collection, and wrote essays for it, with titles such as "Mutant Fleas and Futurian Economics: The Merril Collection Sells Its Swag" (2011) and "Mad Hatters, Scones, and Carolling à la Cthulhu at the Merril" (2011).

In 1995, Toolis moved the renamed Merril Collection to the Lillian H. Smith branch of the library. By the time she retired in 2017, the Merril Collection had grown to over 80,000 items, including published works, manuscripts, audiovisual materials, games, and ephemera. Just before her retirement, she welcomed a collection of books by Dominican authors into the collection. She was succeeded as senior department head at the Merril by Sephora Hosein. "Today, the Merril is a treasure, and it's in no small part thanks to Lorna and her team," noted Cory Doctorow in 2017.

Toolis was frequently mentioned in the acknowledgments of scholarly works on science fiction, and in novels and collections of short fiction. For one notable example, Margaret Atwood credited the Merril Collection, and Toolis by name, in the acknowledgments of The Blind Assassin (2000).

=== Other activities ===
Toolis was a founding member of SF Canada. She co-edited Tesseracts 4 (1992) with Michael Skeet; the collection of Canadian science fiction stories won an Aurora Award. In 2000 she spoke on a panel about popular culture at the Mid-Atlantic Regional Archives Conference. In 2007, she contributed to the compilation of Visions of Mars, a collection of popular cultural images of Mars through history, assembled by the Planetary Society. In 2017, she was inducted into the Canadian Science Fiction & Fantasy Association Hall of Fame.

== Personal life ==
Toolis married Michael Skeet in 1984. She died on August 11, 2021, in Toronto, Ontario.
