= Blind Voices =

1978 novel by Tom Reamy

- First edition, cover art by David Plourde
- Author: Tom Reamy
- Language: English
- Publication date: 1978

Blind Voices is a 1978 science fiction novel by Tom Reamy. Reamy's only novel, it was published "posthumously in a complete but not final draft" by Berkley Books.

== Synopsis ==
In the early 1930s, three young women in a small Kansas town discover Haverstock's Traveling Curiosus and Wonder Show, and find themselves attracted to its exhibits — some of whom are far more than they seem.

== Reception ==
Blind Voices won the 1979 Balrog Award for best novel, and was a finalist for the Nebula Award for Best Novel of 1978 the 1979 Hugo Award for Best Novel, and the 1979 BSFA Award for Best Novel.

Kirkus Reviews considered the novel to be "unsatisfying" and "disappointing", faulting Reamy's exposition as "plodding", and "at odds" with the "grotesqueness" of the subject matter. Jo Walton, conversely, described it as "beautifully written" and "Bradburyesque".

Roz Kaveney found its ending to be "slightly tentative and elegiac", and noted that Haverstock's creation of the freaks via rudimentary genetic engineering was a "pretext" for classifying the book as science fiction — one which "has little to do with the feel or plot." Algis Budrys called the novel "substantial" and "adventurous and suspenseful", lauding Reamy's depictions of characters and setting, and stating that if he were to — like Reamy — be found dead at his typewriter, he "wouldn't be ashamed if something like Blind Voices were in it."
