= The Broken Sword (graphic novel) =

- Cover page of the graphic novel

Publication information
- Publisher: Trumpet
- Genre: Sword and sorcery; Heroic fantasy
- Publication date: 1966-1968

Creative team
- Written by: Tom Reamy
- Artist: George Barr

The Broken Sword is a black-and-white sword and sorcery graphic novel adaptation of the novel of the same name by Poul Anderson, adapted by writer Tom Reamy and illustrated by George Barr. The work was serialized in the Hugo Award–nominated science fiction fanzine Trumpet during the mid-to-late 1960s but was left unfinished.

Set in a world that mixes Norse mythology with the historical Viking Age, the work draws from the sagas with fantasy creatures such as elves, trolls, and changelings. There were plans to continue the adaptation, but these came to an end with Reamy's death in 1977.
