= The Birth of Venus =

Painting by Sandro Botticelli

External videos
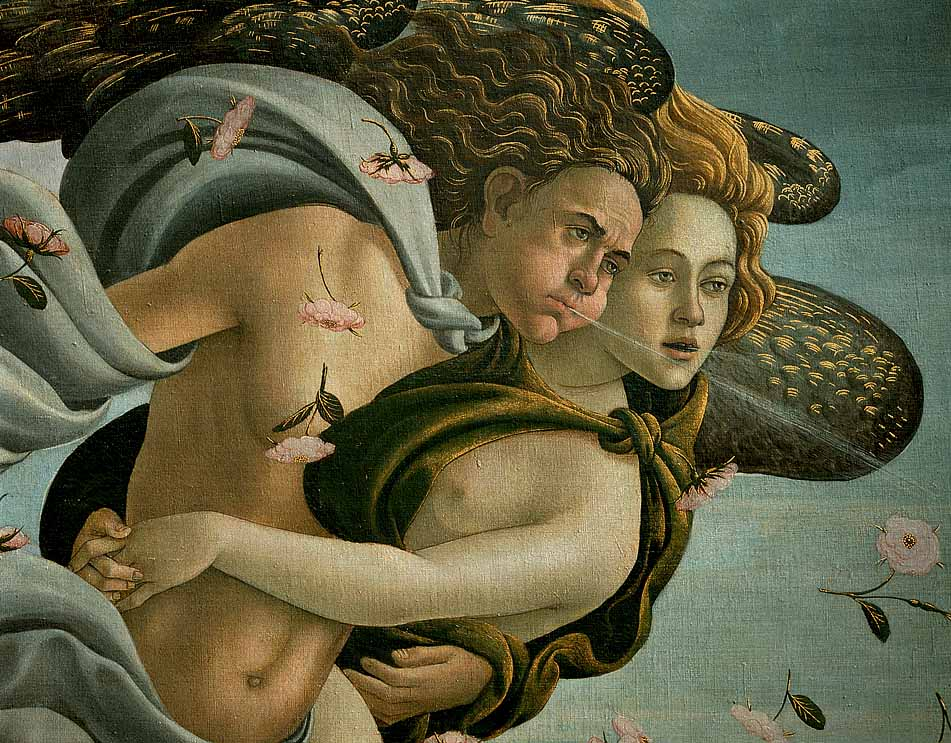
- Smarthistory – Botticelli's Birth of Venus

Sandro Botticelli, The Birth of Venus (c. 1484–1486). Tempera on canvas. 172.5 cm × 278.9 cm (67.9 in × 109.6 in). Uffizi, Florence

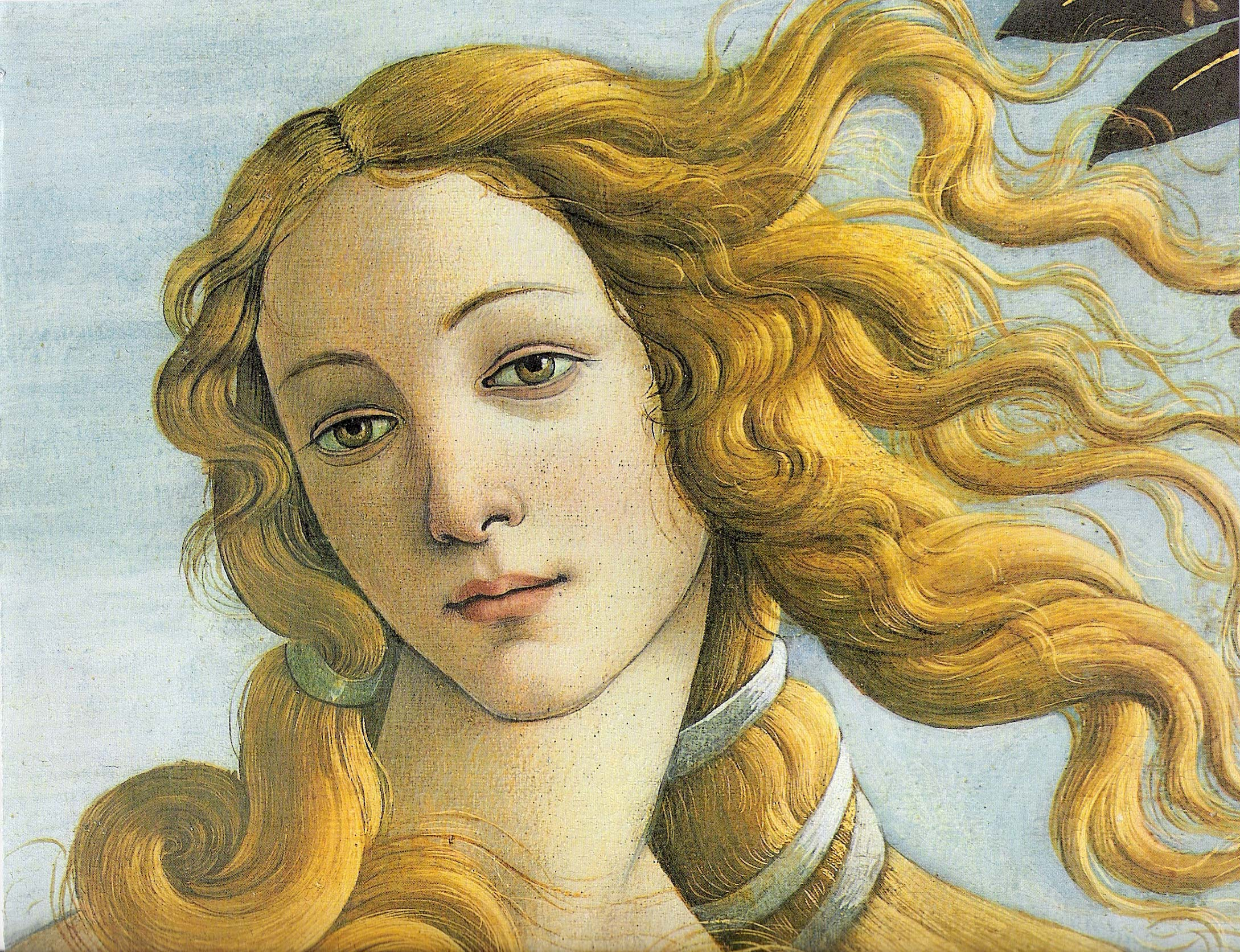
Detail: the face of Venus

The Birth of Venus (Italian: Nascita di Venere [ˈnaʃʃita di ˈvɛːnere]) is a painting by the Italian artist Sandro Botticelli, probably executed in the mid-1480s. It depicts the goddess Venus arriving at the shore after her birth, when she had emerged from the sea fully grown (called Venus Anadyomene and often depicted in art). The painting is in the Uffizi Gallery in Florence, Italy.

Although the two are not a pair, the painting is inevitably discussed with Botticelli's other very large mythological painting, the Primavera, also in the Uffizi. They are among the most famous paintings in the world, and icons of Italian Renaissance painting; of the two, the Birth is better known than the Primavera. As depictions of subjects from classical mythology on a very large scale they were virtually unprecedented in Western art since classical antiquity, as was the size and prominence of a nude female figure in the Birth. It used to be thought that they were both commissioned by the same member of the Medici family, but this is now uncertain.

They have been endlessly analysed by art historians, with the main themes being: the emulation of ancient painters and the context of wedding celebrations (generally agreed), the influence of Renaissance Neo-Platonism (somewhat controversial), and the identity of the commissioners (not agreed). Most art historians agree, however, that the Birth does not require complex analysis to decode its meaning, in the way that the Primavera probably does. While there are subtleties in the painting, its main meaning is a straightforward, if individual, treatment of a traditional scene from Greek mythology, and its appeal is sensory and very accessible, hence its enormous popularity.

== Description and subject ==
The Hora of Spring

In the centre, the goddess Venus (newly born in fully grown state, in accordance with tradition) stands nude in a giant scallop shell. The size of the shell is purely imaginary, and is also found in classical depictions of the subject. At the left the wind god Zephyrus blows at her, with the wind shown by lines radiating from his mouth. He is in the air, and carries a young female, who is also blowing, but less forcefully. Both have wings. Vasari was probably correct in identifying her as "Aura", personification of a lighter breeze. Their joint efforts are blowing Venus towards the shore, and blowing the hair and clothes of the other figures to the right.

At the right a female figure who may be floating slightly above the ground holds out a rich cloak or dress to cover Venus when she reaches the shore, as she is about to do. She is one of the three Horae or Hours, Greek minor goddesses of the seasons and of other divisions of time, and attendants of Venus. The floral decoration of her dress suggests she is the Hora of Spring. She stands in a contrapposto pose, similarly to Venus as she seems relaxed and joyful that Venus has arrived.

Alternative identifications for the two secondary female figures involve those also found in the Primavera; the nymph held by Zephyr may be Chloris, a flower nymph he married in some versions of her story, and the figure on land may be Flora. Flora is generally the Roman equivalent of the Greek Chloris; in the Primavera, Chloris is transformed into the figure of Flora next to her, following Ovid's Fasti, but it is hard to see that such a transformation is envisaged here. However, the roses blown along with the two flying figures would be appropriate for Chloris.

The subject is not strictly the "Birth of Venus", a title given to the painting only in the nineteenth century (though given as the subject by Vasari), but the next scene in her story, where she arrives on land, blown by the wind. The land probably represents either Cythera or Cyprus, both Mediterranean islands regarded by the Greeks as territories of Venus.

== Technical ==
The painting is large, but slightly smaller than the Primavera, and where that is a panel painting, this is on the cheaper support of canvas. Canvas was increasing in popularity, perhaps especially for secular paintings for country villas, which were decorated more simply, cheaply and cheerfully than those for city palazzi, being designed for pleasure more than ostentatious entertainment.

The painting is on two pieces of canvas, sewn together before starting, with a gesso ground tinted blue. There are differences to Botticelli's usual technique, working on panel supports, such as the lack of a green first layer under the flesh areas. There are a number of pentimenti revealed by modern scientific testing. The Hora originally had "low classical sandals", and the collar on the mantle she holds out is an afterthought. The hair of Venus and the flying couple was changed. There is heavy use of gold as a pigment for highlights, on hair, wings, textiles, the shell and the landscape. This was all apparently applied after the painting was framed. It was finished with a "cool gray varnish", probably using egg yolk.

As in the Primavera, the green pigment – used for the wings of Zephyr, Zephyr's companion, and the leaves of the orange trees on the land – has darkened considerably with exposure to light over time, somewhat distorting the intended balance of colours. Parts of some leaves at the top right corner, normally covered by the frame, have been less affected. The blues of the sea and sky have also lost their brightness.

== Style ==
Venus

Although the pose of Venus is classical in some respects, and borrows the position of the hands from the Venus Pudica type in Greco-Roman sculptures (see section below), the overall treatment of the figure, standing off-centre with a curved body of long flowing lines, is in many respects from Gothic art. Kenneth Clark wrote: "Her differences from antique form are not physiological, but rhythmic and structural. Her whole body follows the curve of a Gothic ivory. It is entirely without that quality so much prized in classical art, known as aplomb; that is to say, the weight of the body is not distributed evenly either side of a central plumb line. .... She is not standing but floating. ... Her shoulders, for example, instead of forming a sort of architrave to her torso, as in the antique nude, run down into her arms in the same unbroken stream of movement as her floating hair."

Venus' body is anatomically improbable, with elongated neck and torso. Her pose is impossible: although she stands in a classical contrapposto stance, her weight is shifted too far over the left leg for the pose to be held. The proportions and poses of the winds to the left do not quite make sense, and none of the figures cast shadows. The painting depicts the world of the imagination rather than being very concerned with realistic depiction.

Ignoring the size and positioning of the wings and limbs of the flying pair on the left, which bother some other critics, Kenneth Clark calls them:

...perhaps the most beautiful example of ecstatic movement in the whole of painting. ... the suspension of our reason is achieved by the intricate rhythms of the drapery which sweep and flow irresistibly around the nude figures. Their bodies, by an endless intricacy of embrace, sustain the current of movement, which finally flickers down their legs and is dispersed like an electric charge.

Botticelli's art was never fully committed to naturalism; in comparison to his contemporary Domenico Ghirlandaio, Botticelli seldom gave weight and volume to his figures and rarely used a deep perspectival space. Botticelli never painted landscape backgrounds with great detail or realism, but this is especially the case here. The laurel trees and the grass below them are green with gold highlights, most of the waves regular patterns, and the landscape seems out of scale with the figures. The clumps of bulrushes in the left foreground are out of place here, as they come from a freshwater species.

== Dating and history ==
It has long been suggested that Botticelli was commissioned to paint the work by the Medici family of Florence, perhaps by Lorenzo di Pierfrancesco de' Medici (1463–1503) a major patron of Botticelli, under the influence of his cousin Lorenzo de' Medici, "il Magnifico". This was first suggested by Herbert Horne in his monograph of 1908, the first major modern work on Botticelli, and long followed by most writers, but more recently has been widely doubted, though it is still accepted by some. Various interpretations of the painting rely on this origin for its meaning. Although relations were perhaps always rather tense between the Magnifico and his young cousins and wards, Lorenzo di Pierfrancesco and his brother Giovanni di Pierfrancesco de' Medici, it may have been politic to commission a work that glorified the older Lorenzo, as some interpretations have it. There may be a deliberate ambiguity as to which Lorenzo was intended to be evoked. In later years hostility between the two branches of the family became overt.

Horne believed that the painting was commissioned soon after the purchase in 1477 of the Villa di Castello, a country house outside Florence, by Lorenzo and Giovanni, to decorate their new house, which they were rebuilding. This was the year after their father died at the age of 46, leaving the young boys wards of their cousin Lorenzo il Magnifico, of the senior branch of the Medici family and de facto ruler of Florence. There is no record of the original commission, and the painting is first mentioned by Vasari, who saw it, together with the Primavera, at Castello, some time before the first edition of his Lives in 1550, probably by 1530–40. In 1550 Vasari was himself painting in the villa, but he very possibly visited it before that. But in 1975 it emerged that, unlike the Primavera, the Birth is not in the inventory, apparently complete, made in 1499 of the works of art belonging to Lorenzo di Pierfrancesco's branch of the family. Ronald Lightbown concludes that it only came to be owned by the Medici after that. The inventory was only published in 1975, and made many previous assumptions invalid.

Horne dated the work at some point after the purchase of the villa in 1477 and before Botticelli's departure for Rome to join the painting of the Sistine Chapel in 1481. Recent scholars prefer a date of around 1484–86 on grounds of the work's place in the development of Botticelli's style. The Primavera is now usually dated earlier, after Botticelli's return from Rome in 1482 and perhaps around the time of Lorenzo di Pierfrancesco's wedding in July 1482, but by some still before Botticelli's departure.

Whenever the two paintings were united at Castello, they have remained together ever since. They stayed in Castello until 1815, when they were transferred to the Uffizi. For some years until 1919 they were kept in the Galleria dell'Accademia, another government museum in Florence.

== Interpretations ==
Although there are ancient and modern texts that are relevant, no single text provides the precise imagery of the painting, which has led scholars to propose many sources and interpretations. Many art historians who specialize in the Italian Renaissance have found Neoplatonic interpretations, of which two different versions have been articulated by Edgar Wind and Ernst Gombrich, to be the key to understanding the painting. Botticelli represented the Neoplatonic idea of divine love in the form of a nude Venus.

For Plato – and so for the members of the Florentine Platonic Academy – Venus had two aspects: she was an earthly goddess who aroused humans to physical love or she was a heavenly goddess who inspired intellectual love in them. Plato further argued that contemplation of physical beauty allowed the mind to better understand spiritual beauty. So, looking at Venus, the most beautiful of goddesses, might at first raise a physical response in viewers which then lifted their minds towards the godly. A Neoplatonic reading of Botticelli's Birth of Venus suggests that 15th-century viewers would have looked at the painting and felt their minds lifted to the realm of divine love.

The composition, with a central nude figure, and one to the side with an arm raised above the head of the first, and winged beings in attendance, would have reminded its Renaissance viewers of the traditional iconography of the Baptism of Christ, marking the start of his ministry on earth. In a similar way, the scene shows here marks the start of Venus's ministry of love, whether in a simple sense, or the expanded meaning of Renaissance Neoplatonism.

More recently, questions have arisen about Neoplatonism as the dominant intellectual system of late 15th-century Florence, and scholars have indicated that there might be other ways to interpret Botticelli's mythological paintings. In particular, both Primavera and Birth of Venus have been seen as wedding paintings that suggest appropriate behaviors for brides and grooms.

The laurel trees at right and laurel wreath worn by the Hora are punning references to the name "Lorenzo", though it is uncertain whether Lorenzo il Magnifico, the effective ruler of Florence, or his young cousin Lorenzo di Pierfrancesco is meant. In the same way the flowers in the air around Zephyr and on the textiles worn and carried by the Hora evoke the name of Florence.

=== Literary sources ===
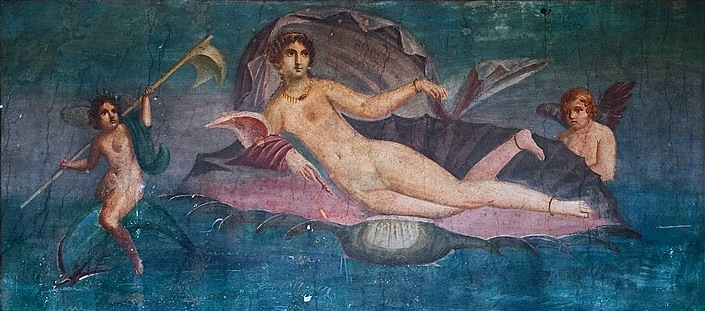
Roman fresco from the "House of Venus" in Pompeii, 1st century AD

The closest precedent for the scene is generally agreed to be in one of the early ancient Greek Homeric Hymns, published in Florence in 1488 by the Greek refugee Demetrios Chalkokondyles:

Of august gold-wreathed and beautiful
Aphrodite I shall sing to whose domain
belong the battlements of all sea-loved
Cyprus where, blown by the moist breath
of Zephyros, she was carried over the
waves of the resounding sea on soft foam.
The gold-filleted Horae happily welcomed
her and clothed her with heavenly raiment.

This poem was probably already known to Botticelli's Florentine contemporary, and Lorenzo di Medici's court poet, Angelo Poliziano. The iconography of The Birth of Venus is similar to a description of a relief of the event in Poliziano's poem the Stanze per la giostra, commemorating a Medici joust in 1475, which may also have influenced Botticelli, although there are many differences. For example, Poliziano talks of multiple Horae and zephyrs. Older writers, following Horne, posited that "his patron Lorenzo di Pierfrancesco asked him to paint a subject illustrating the lines", and that remains a possibility, though one difficult to maintain so confidently today. Another poem by Politian speaks of Zephyr causing flowers to bloom, and spreading their scent over the land, which probably explains the roses he blows along with him in the painting.

=== Ancient art ===
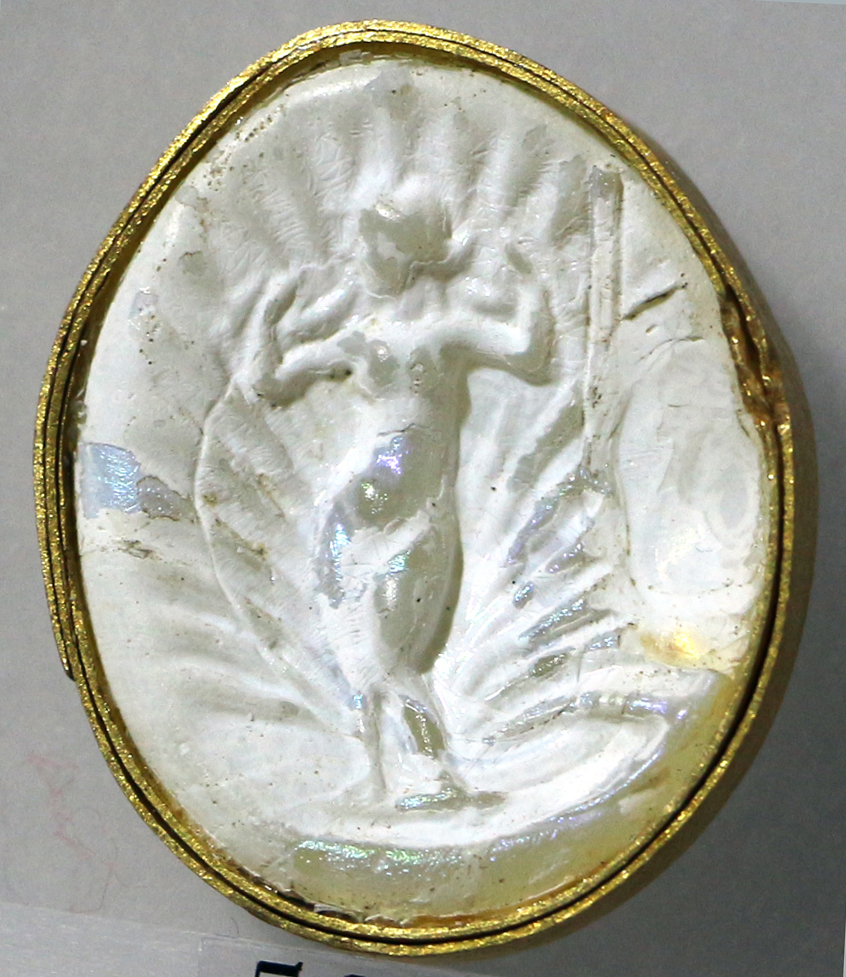
Roman glass cameo Venus Anadyomene

Having a large standing female nude as the central focus was unprecedented in post-classical Western painting, and certainly drew on the classical sculptures which were coming to light in this period, especially in Rome, where Botticelli had spent 1481–82 working on the walls of the Sistine Chapel. The pose of Botticelli's Venus follows the Venus Pudica ("Venus of Modesty") type from classical antiquity, where the hands are held to cover the breasts and groin; in classical art this is not associated with the new-born Venus Anadyomene. What became a famous example of this type is the Venus de' Medici, a marble sculpture that was in a Medici collection in Rome by 1559, which Botticelli may have had opportunity to study (the date it was found is unclear).

The painter and the humanist scholars who probably advised him would have recalled that Pliny the Elder had mentioned a lost masterpiece of the celebrated ancient Greek painter, Apelles, representing Venus Anadyomene (Venus Rising from the Sea). According to Pliny, Alexander the Great offered his mistress, Campaspe, as the model for the nude Venus and later, realizing that Apelles had fallen in love with the girl, gave her to the artist in a gesture of extreme magnanimity. Pliny went on to note that Apelles' painting of Campaspe as Venus was later "dedicated by Augustus in the shrine of his father Caesar." Pliny also stated that "the lower part of the painting was damaged, and it was impossible to find anyone who could restore it. ... This picture decayed from age and rottenness, and Nero ... substituted for it another painting by the hand of Dorotheus".

Pliny also noted a second painting by Apelles of Venus "superior even to his earlier one," that had been begun by the artist but left unfinished. The Roman images in various media showing the new-born Venus in a giant shell may well be crude derivative versions of these paintings. Botticelli could not have seen the frescos unearthed later in Pompeii, but may well have seen small versions of the motif in terracotta or engraved gems. The "House of Venus" in Pompeii has a life-size fresco of Venus lying in the shell, also seen in other works; in most other images she stands with her hands on her hair, wringing the water from it, with or without a shell.

The two-dimensionality of this painting may be a deliberate attempt to evoke the style of ancient Greek vase painting or frescos on the walls of Etruscan tombs, the only types of ancient painting known to Botticelli.

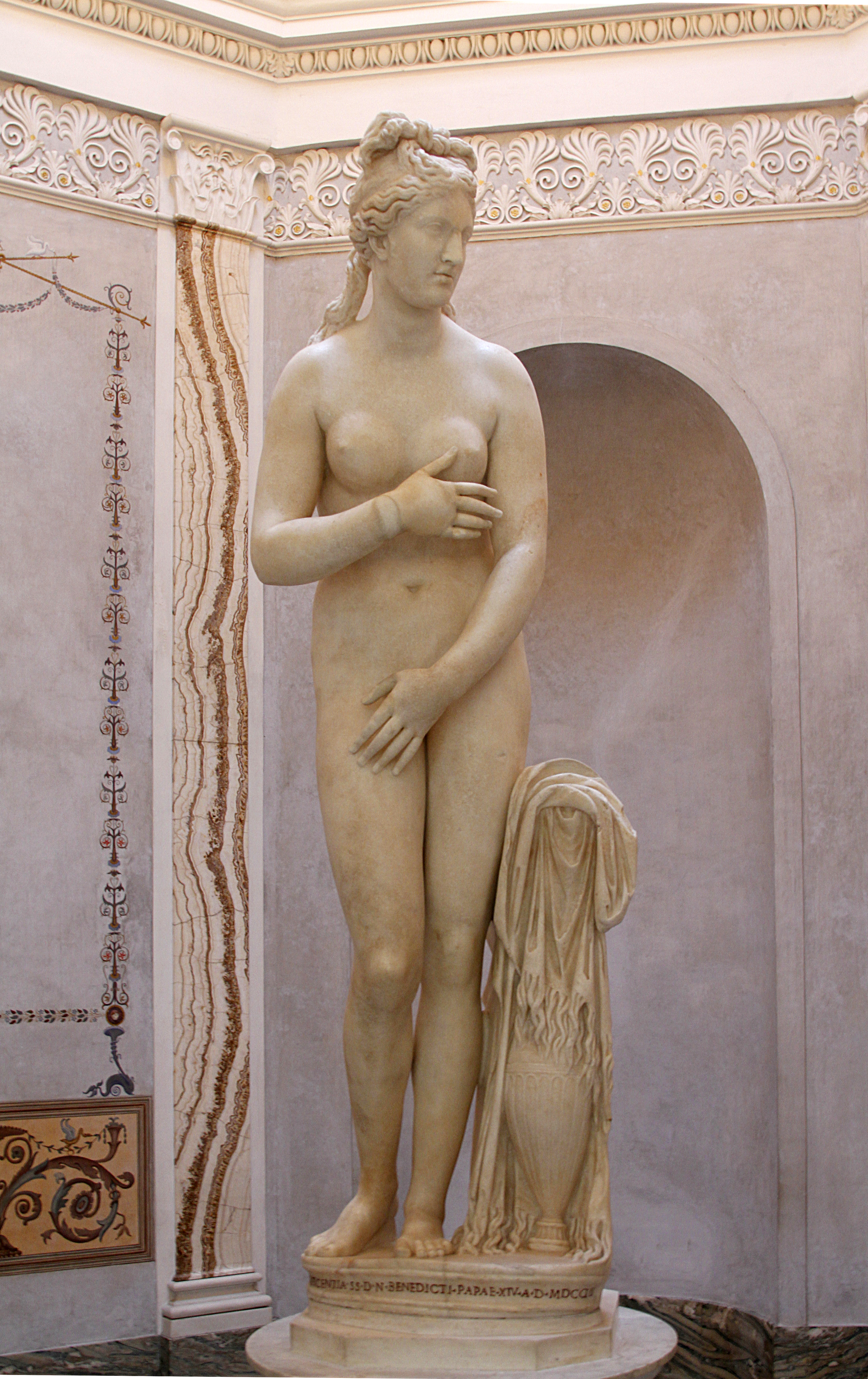
Capitoline Venus, derived from Aphrodite of Cnidus

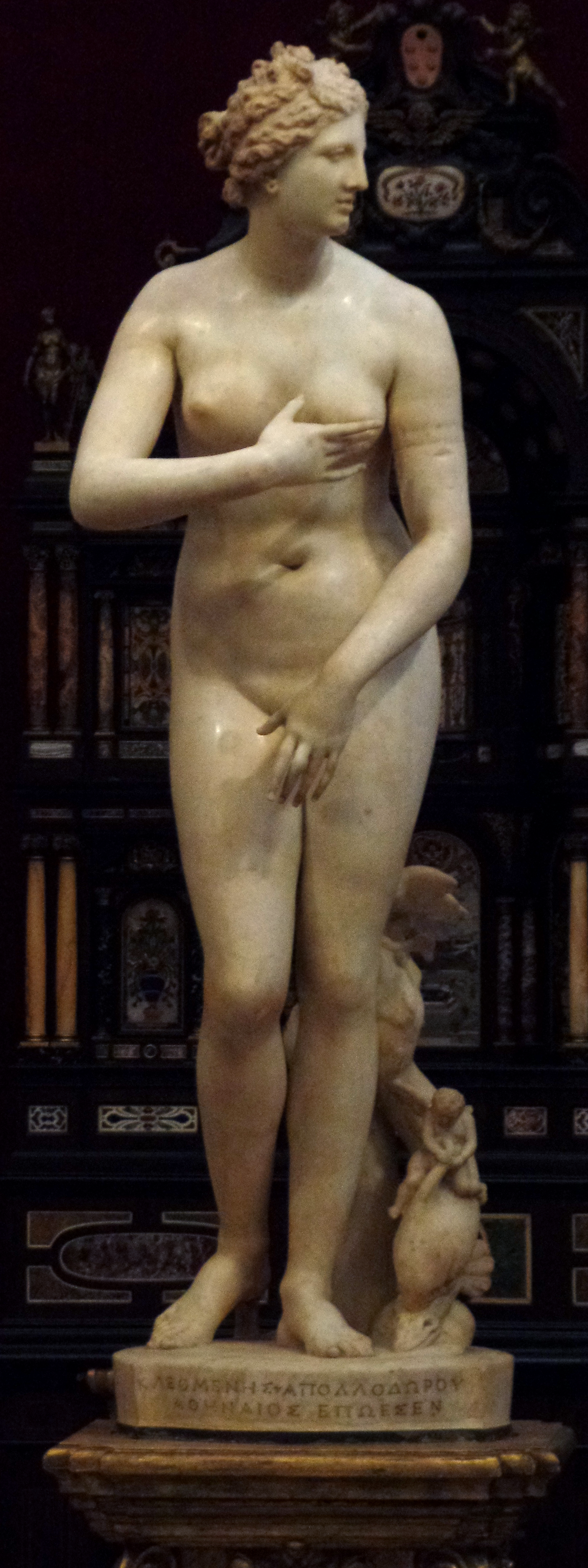
Venus de' Medici

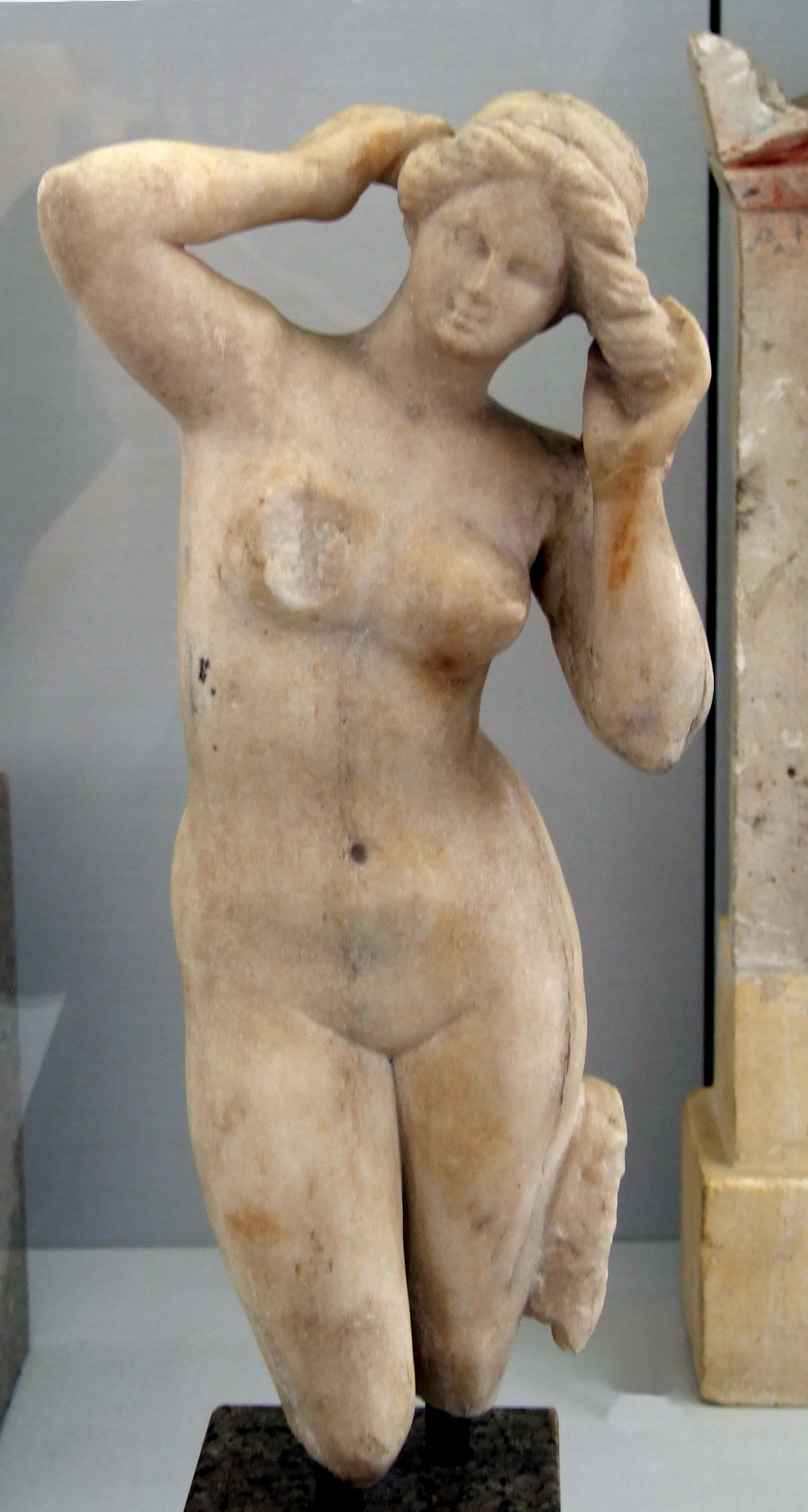
Greco-Roman Venus Anadyomene

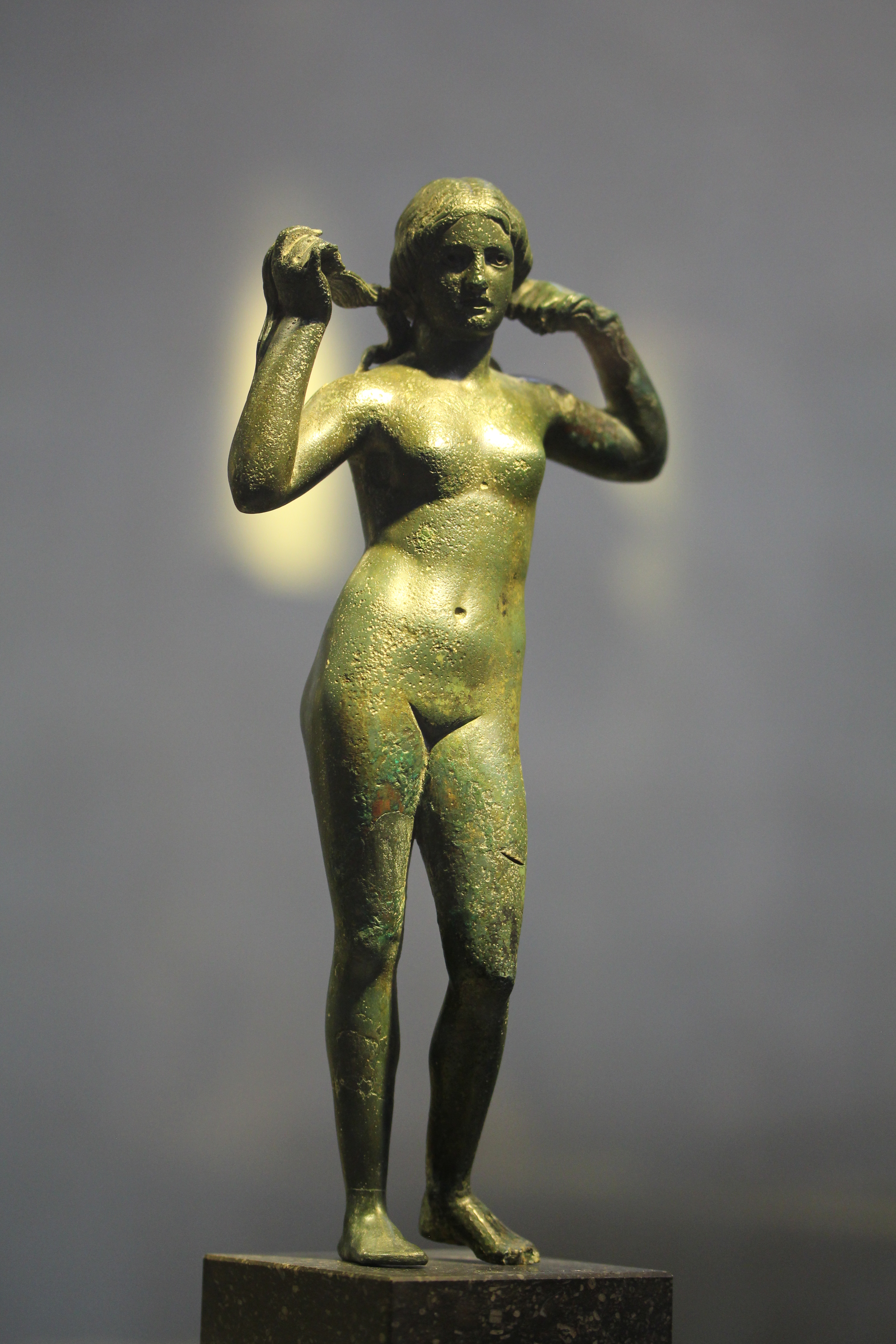
Greco-Roman bronze statuette

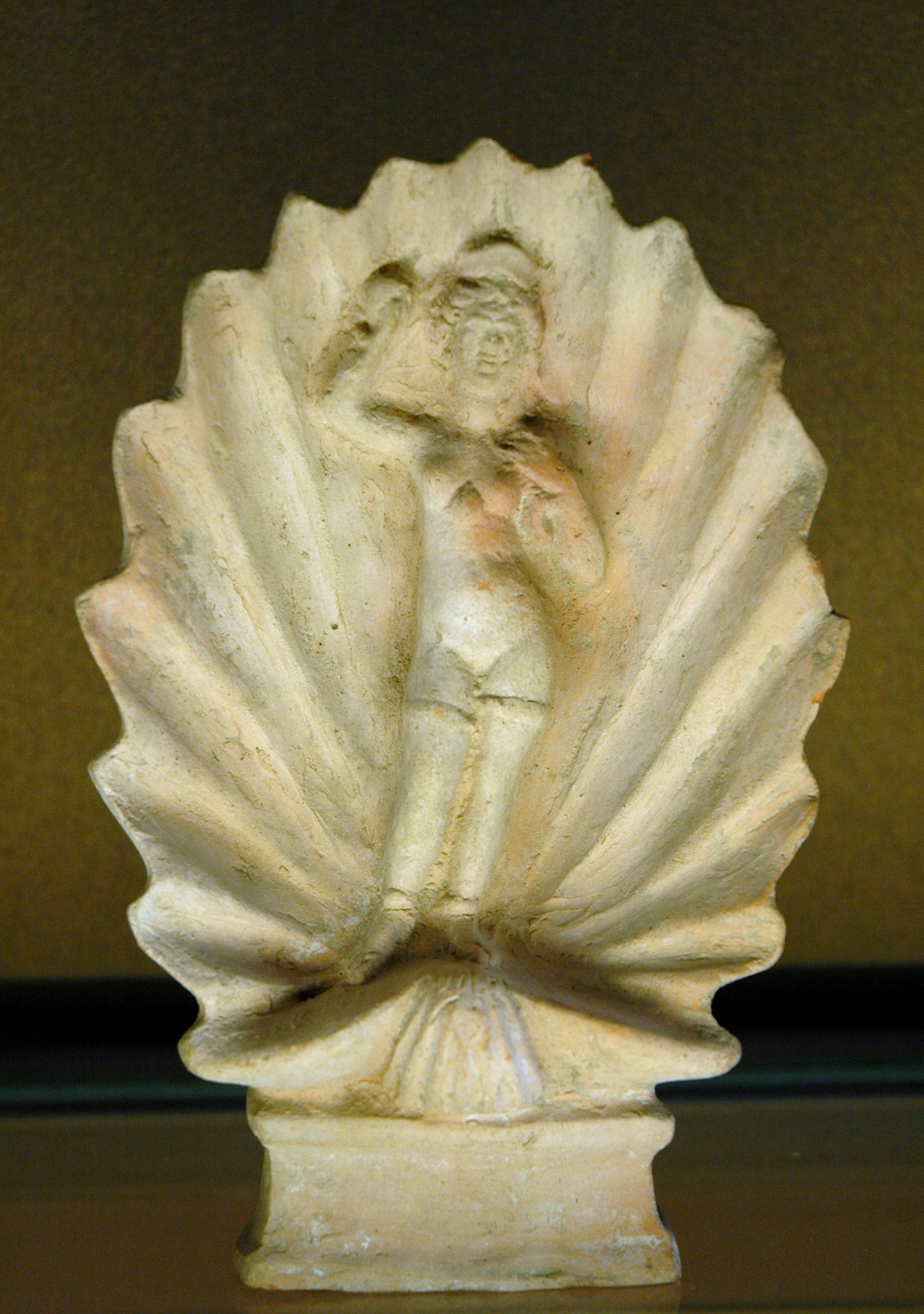
Greek terracotta, from Pontus

=== Charles R. Mack's interpretation ===
Zephyr and his companion

Another interpretation of the Birth of Venus is provided by art historian and author, Charles R. Mack. This interpretation takes much that is generally agreed, but Mack goes on to explain the painting as an allegory extolling the virtues of Lorenzo de' Medici. This has not been adopted by Renaissance art historians in general, and it remains problematic, since it depends on the painting being commissioned by the Medici, yet the work is not documented in Medici hands until well into the following century.

Mack sees the scene as inspired by both the Homeric Hymn and the ancient paintings. But something more than a rediscovered Homeric hymn was likely in the mind of the Medici family member who commissioned this painting from Botticelli. Once again, Botticelli, in his version of the Birth of Venus, might be seen as completing the task begun by his ancient predecessor Apelles, even surpassing him. Giving added support to this interpretation of Botticelli as a born-again Apelles is the fact that that very claim was voiced in 1488 by Ugolino Verino in a poem entitled "On Giving Praise to the History of Florence."

While Botticelli might well have been celebrated as a revivified Apelles, his Birth of Venus also testified to the special nature of Florence's chief citizen, Lorenzo de' Medici. Although it now seems that the painting was executed for another member of the Medici family, it likely was intended to celebrate and flatter its head, Lorenzo de' Medici. Tradition associates the image of Venus in Botticelli's painting with the famous beauty Simonetta Cattaneo Vespucci, of whom popular legend claims both Lorenzo and his younger brother, Giuliano, were great admirers. Simonetta was possibly born in the Ligurian seaside town of Portovenere ('the port of Venus'). Thus, in Botticelli's interpretation, Pankaspe (the ancient living prototype of Simonetta), the mistress of Alexander the Great (the Laurentian predecessor), becomes the lovely model for the lost Venus executed by the famous Greek painter Apelles (reborn through the recreative talents of Botticelli), which ended up in Rome, installed by Emperor Augustus in the temple dedicated to Florence's supposed founder Julius Caesar.

In the case of Botticelli's Birth of Venus, the suggested references to Lorenzo, supported by other internal indicators such as the stand of laurel bushes at the right, would have been just the sort of thing erudite Florentine humanists would have appreciated. Accordingly, by overt implication, Lorenzo becomes the new Alexander the Great with an implied link to both Augustus, the first Roman emperor, and even to Florence's legendary founder, Caesar himself. Lorenzo, furthermore, is not only magnificent but, as was Alexander in Pliny's story, also magnanimous, as well. Ultimately, these readings of the Birth of Venus flatter not only the Medici and Botticelli but all of Florence, home to the worthy successors to some of the greatest figures of antiquity, both in governance and in the arts.

These essentially pagan readings of Botticelli's Birth of Venus should not exclude a more purely Christian one, which may be derived from the Neoplatonic reading of the painting indicated above. Viewed from a religious standpoint, the nudity of Venus suggests that of Eve before the Fall as well as the pure love of Paradise. Once landed, the goddess of love will don the earthly garb of mortal sin, an act that will lead to the New Eve – the Madonna whose purity is represented by the nude Venus. Once draped in earthly garments she becomes a personification of the Christian Church which offers a spiritual transport back to the pure love of eternal salvation. In this case the scallop shell upon which this image of Venus/Eve/Madonna/Church stands may be seen in its traditionally symbolic pilgrimage context. Furthermore, the broad expanse of sea serves as a reminder of the Virgin Mary's title stella maris, alluding both to the Madonna's name (Maria/maris) and to the heavenly body (Venus/stella). The sea brings forth Venus just as the Virgin gives birth to the ultimate symbol of love, Christ.

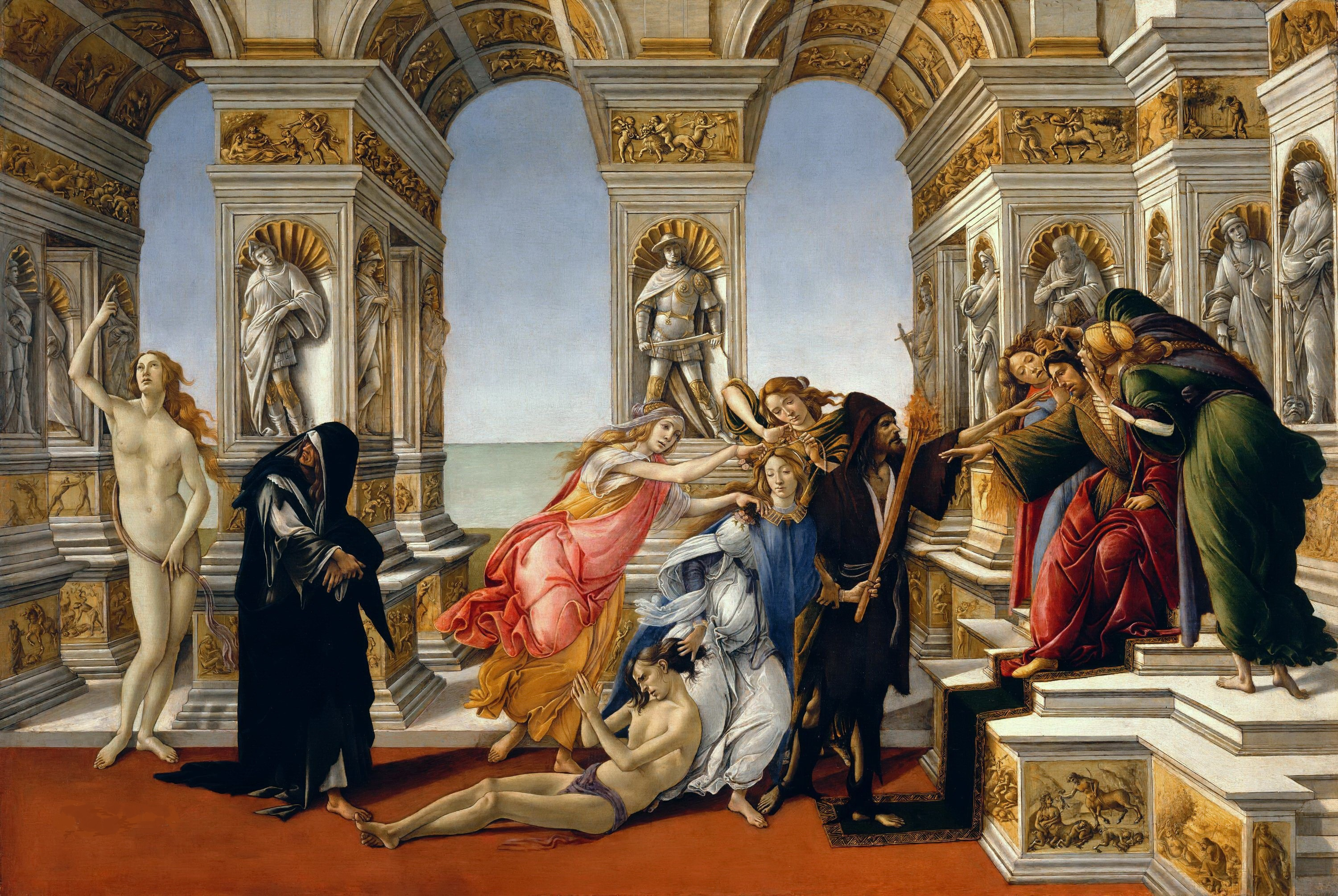
Calumny of Apelles, 1494–95, with "Truth" at left. Uffizi, Florence.

Rather than choosing one of the many interpretations offered for Botticelli's depiction of the Birth (Arrival?) of Venus it might be better to view it from a variety of perspectives. This layered approach—mythological, political, religious—was intended.

== Derivative versions ==
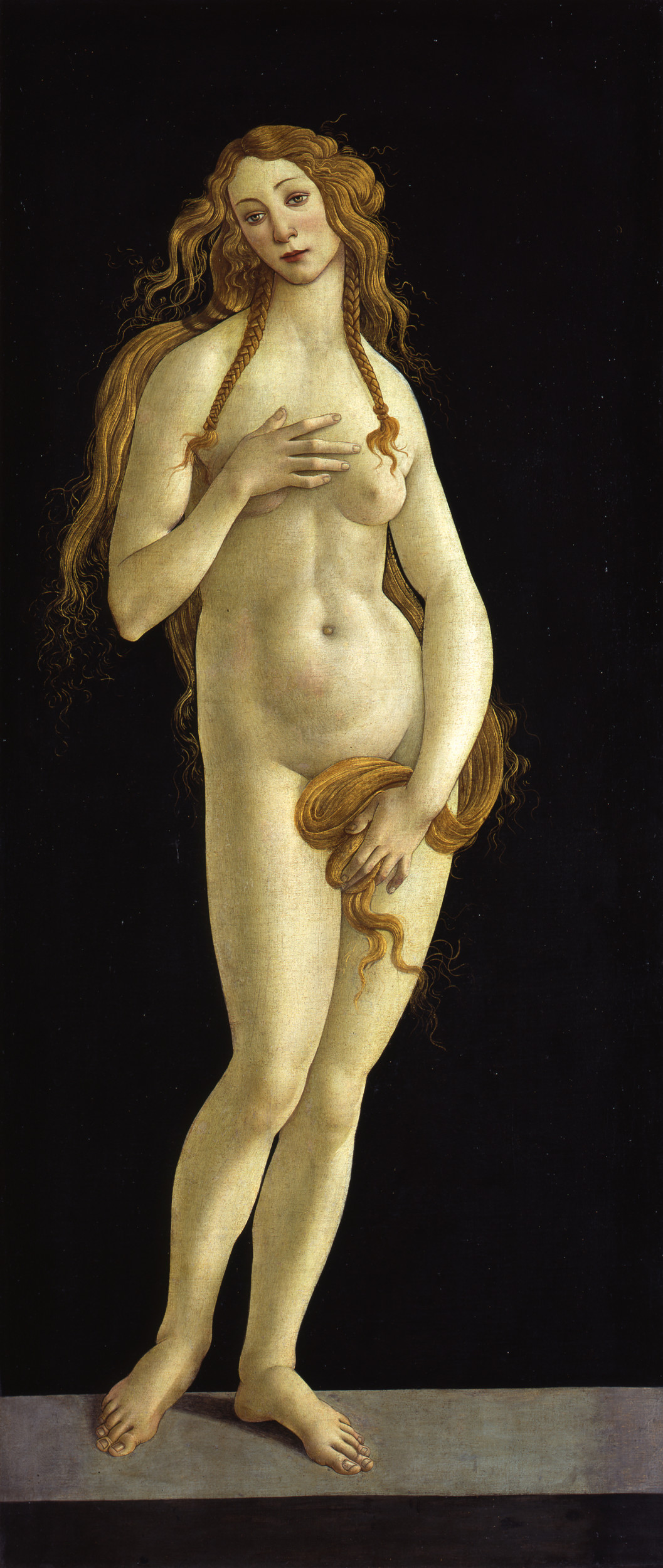
Berlin Venus, workshop of Botticelli. Gemäldegalerie, Berlin.

Botticelli, or more likely his workshop, repeated the figure of Venus in another painting of about 1490. This life-sized work depicts a similar figure and pose, partially clad in a light blouse, and contrasted against a plain dark background. It is in the Galleria Sabauda in Turin. There is another such workshop Venus in Berlin, and very likely others were destroyed in the "Bonfire of the Vanities". Examples seem to have been exported to France and Germany, probably influencing Lucas Cranach the Elder among others.

More than a decade later, Botticelli adapted the figure of Venus for a nude personification of "Truth" in his Calumny of Apelles. Here one hand is raised, pointing to heaven for justification, and the figure's gaze also looks upwards; the whole effect is very different.

A detail from Botticelli’s Venus has appeared on the back of Italian ten-cent coins since the Euro’s initial adoption in 2002. The coin, made of Nordic Gold, features a small effigy of Venus’ face and neck, encircled within twelve five-point stars, alongside an Italian Republic Monogram and its mint year.

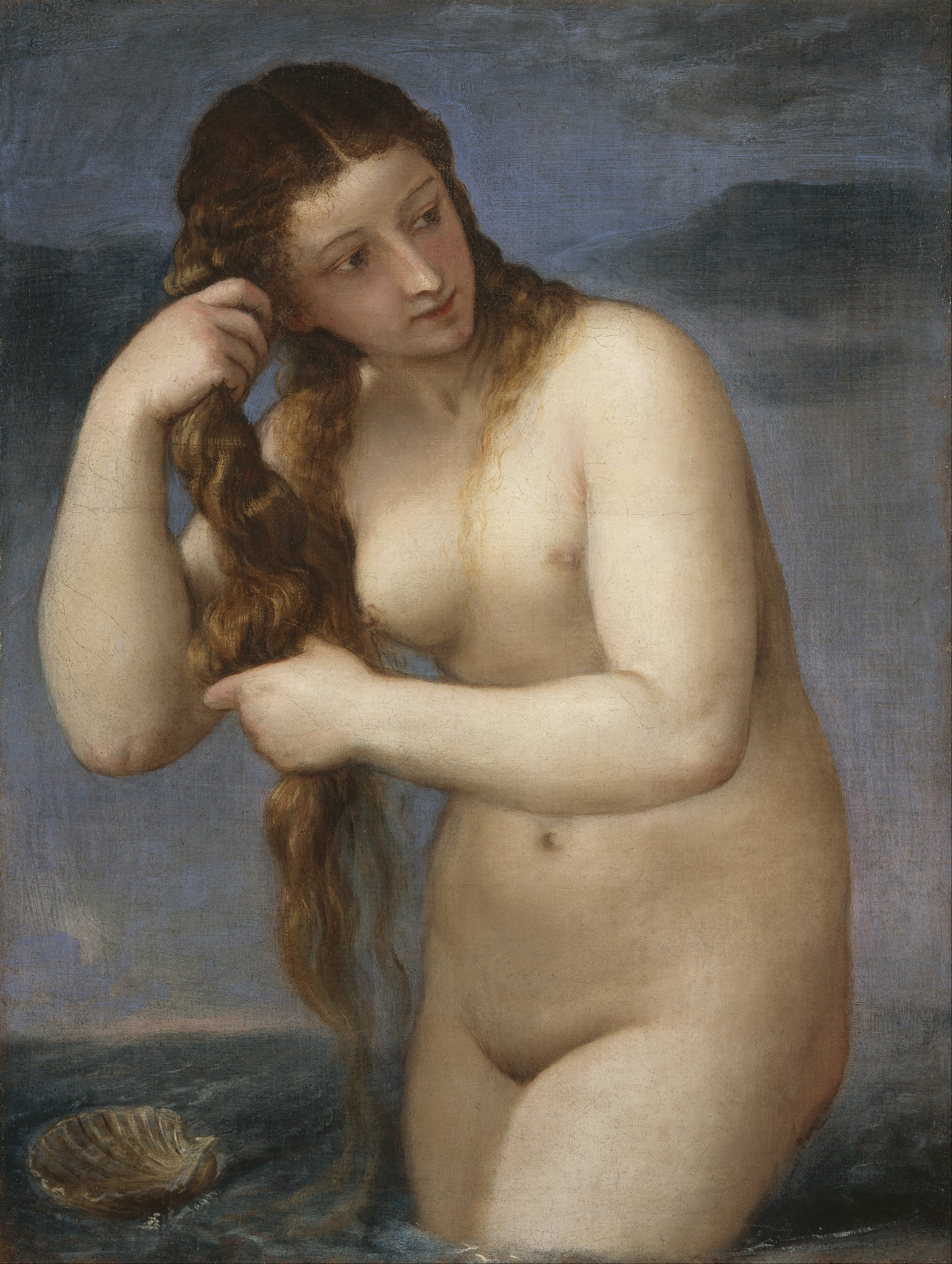
"Venus Rising from the Sea" by Titian c. 1520-25

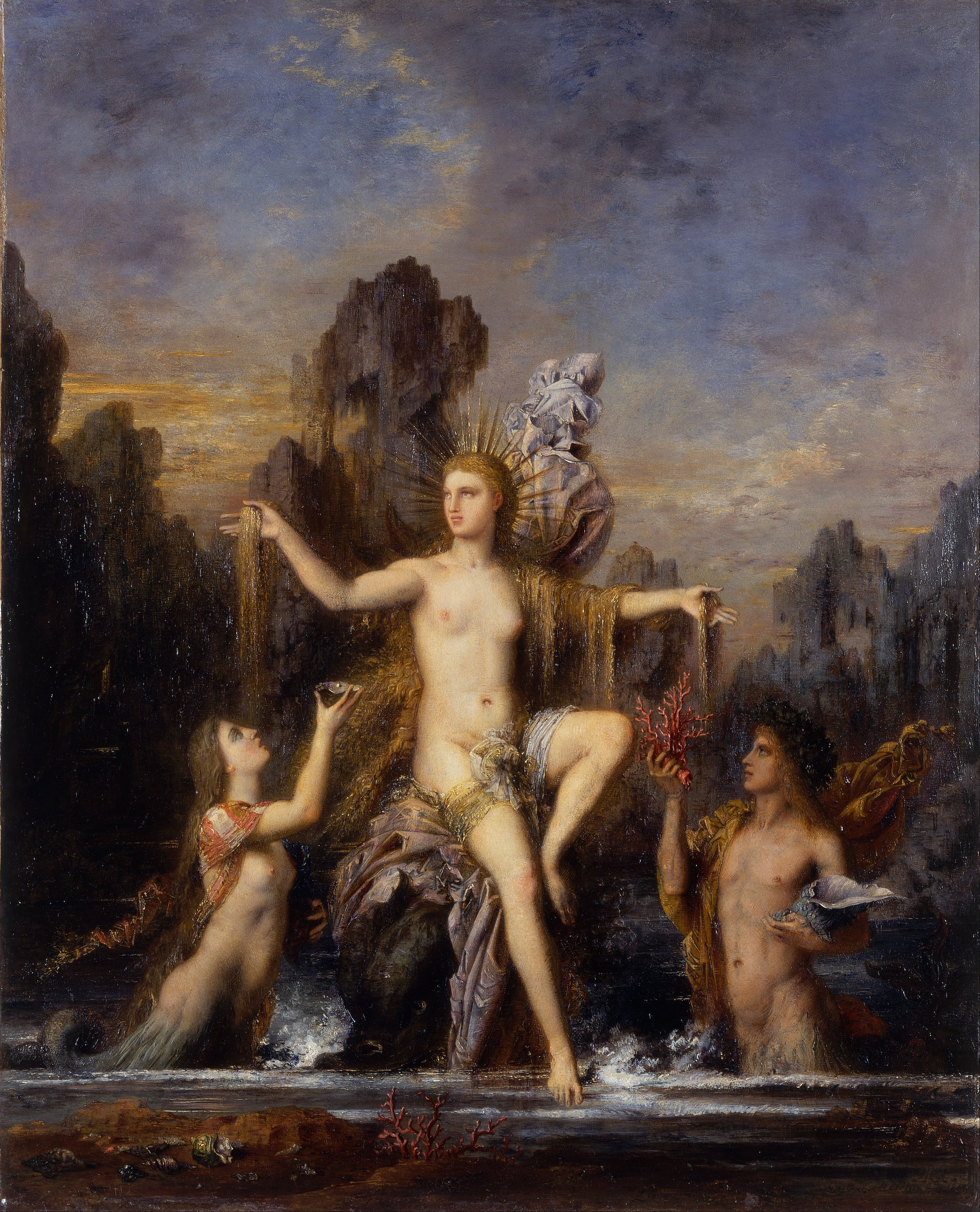
Venus sortant de l'Onde, Gustave Moreau, 1866

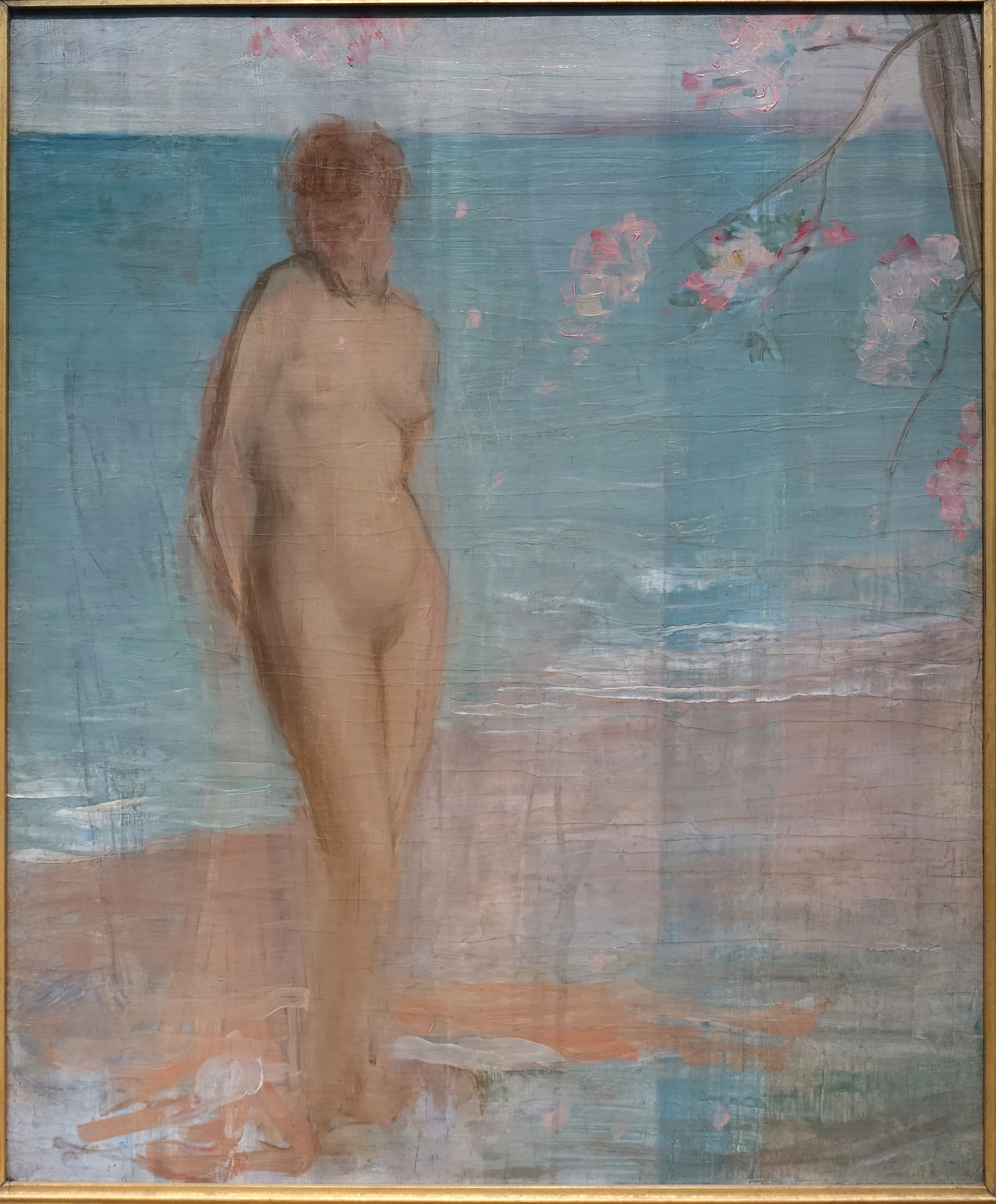
Venus Rising from the Sea by James McNeill Whistler, c. 1866-1870

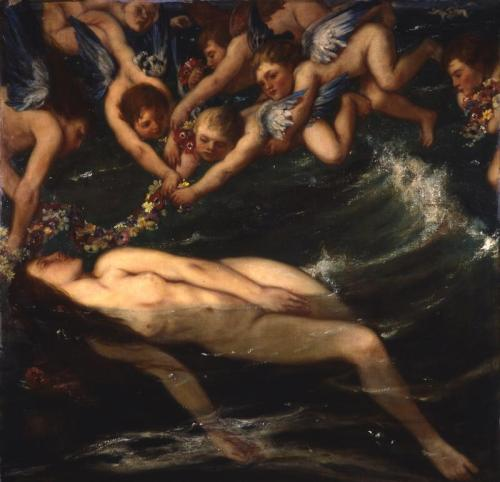
The Birth of Venus by Charles Haslewood Shannon, 1923

== References in popular culture ==
- Parts of the painting are used for the background of the cover artwork for the 2013 Lady Gaga album Artpop.

- The music video for the album's lead single, "Applause", also features a reference to the painting, depicting the singer in a blonde wig, wearing nothing but shells. The music video also contains nods to various other famous works of art, including the Andy Warhol painting Marilyn Diptych.

- A stylised detail of the painting, with a portion of Venus's face, was used by Adobe in the splash screen image for their Illustrator software from its initial version in 1986 until 2003.
- The painting is recreated in one scene from the 1988 Terry Gilliam film The Adventures of Baron Munchausen.
- The painting is used as the background for the cover artwork for the 2020 Cecile Believe album Made in Heaven.
- The painting is referenced in the title and cover artwork for Venus on the Half-Shell, a science fiction novel by Philip José Farmer.
- Andy Warhol reproduced the image in his series Details of Renaissance Paintings (Sandro Botticelli, Birth of Venus, 1482) Portfolio (F & S II.316–319). The portfolio comprises four screenprints in editions of 70, plus proofs, each signed and numbered.

== See also ==
- List of works by Sandro Botticelli
- 100 Great Paintings, 1980 BBC series
