= Venus on the Half-Shell =

1975 science fiction novel by Philip José Farmer

- First edition
- Author: Philip José Farmer as Kilgore Trout
- Language: English
- Genre: Science fiction
- Publisher: Dell Publishing
- Publication date: 1975
- Publication place: United States
- Media type: Print (paperback)
- Pages: 204
- ISBN: 0-440-36149-4
- OCLC: 17008560

Venus on the Half-Shell is a science fiction novel by American writer Philip José Farmer, writing pseudonymously as "Kilgore Trout", a fictional recurring character in many of the novels of Kurt Vonnegut. This book first appeared as a fictitious "excerpt"—attributed to Trout (though written by Vonnegut)—in the ninth chapter of Vonnegut's God Bless You, Mr. Rosewater (1965). With Vonnegut's permission, Farmer expanded the fragment into an entire standalone novel (including, as an in-joke, a scene that incorporates all of Vonnegut's original text). Farmer's story was first published in two parts beginning in the December 1974 issue of The Magazine of Fantasy and Science Fiction. The plot, in which Earth is destroyed by cosmic bureaucrats doing routine maintenance and the sole human survivor goes on a quest to find the "Definitive Answer to the Ultimate Question", was an inspiration for the plot of the later Hitchhiker's Guide to the Galaxy series.

According to Farmer's introduction in Venus on the Half-Shell and Others, Vonnegut was initially reluctant to allow the project, but finally relented. After publication, a poorly worded magazine article gave Vonnegut the impression that Farmer had planned to write the story regardless of his permission, which angered Vonnegut. Also, it was popularly assumed that Vonnegut wrote the book. This problem was solved by reprinting the book with Farmer's name as author.

A common element to this novel is the origin of many of the characters' and locations' names. Farmer "put in a lot of references to literature and fictional authors... Most of the alien names in Venus were formed by transposing the letters of English or non-English words."

The title and paperback cover art are a reference to an Italian Renaissance tempera painting by Sandro Botticelli, The Birth of Venus, which depicts the birth of the goddess Venus as her rising from the sea on a scallop shell. The phrase "on the half-shell" commonly refers to a method of serving oysters.

In 2013, Titan Books reprinted Venus on the Half-Shell with new cover art referencing The Birth of Venus.

In 2009, the book was listed by The Guardian as one of the '1000 novels everyone should read'.

== Table of character names with known origins ==
Name	Origin	Etymology
Chworktap	Patchwork	anagram
Utapal	Laputa	anagram
Zelpst	selbst	phonetic rendering of the German word meaning self
Raproshma	rapprochement	phonetic rendering of the French word meaning approximation.
Dokal	Caudal	pseudo-anagram (means having a tail)
Tunc	Cunt	anagram
Angavi	vagina	anagram
Gviirl	Virgil	anagram
Clerun-Gowph	Aufklärung	derived from the German word for enlightenment
Odiomzwak	Quasimodo	pseudo-anagram

== General sources ==
- Farmer, Philip José (2008), Venus on the Half-Shell and Others, Subterranean Press.
