= San Diego Lightfoot Sue =

1975 short story by Tom Reamy

"San Diego Lightfoot Sue" is a 1975 fantasy short story by American writer Tom Reamy. It was first published in The Magazine of Fantasy & Science Fiction.

== Plot summary ==
In the early 1960s, a naive teenager from Kansas moves to Los Angeles, where he falls in love with a former prostitute.

== Reception ==
"San Diego Lightfoot Sue" won the Nebula Award for Best Novelette of 1975, and was a finalist for the 1976 Hugo Award for Best Novelette. Publishers Weekly called it "smooth".

The story has been cited as an example of the idea that magic can be dangerous to the wielder if incorrectly performed (when the prostitute casts a spell to rejuvenate herself so that the teenager can see what she looked like when she was his age, she is "consumed by green fire"), and as evidence that Reamy was, if not gay himself, then "remarkably familiar with the gay idiom of the time".
