= The Meeting (short story) =

1972 science fiction short story by Frederik Pohl

"The Meeting" is a 1972 science fiction short story by American writer Frederik Pohl, based on an unfinished draft by Cyril M. Kornbluth. It was first published in The Magazine of Fantasy & Science Fiction; an audio version was read by Bradley Denton.

== Synopsis ==
Harry and Margaret Vladek have a son with severe developmental disabilities. They are offered the chance to have his brain replaced with that of a cognitively normal child who was killed in an accident.

== Reception ==
"The Meeting" won the 1973 Hugo Award for Best Short Story, tied with R. A. Lafferty's "Eurema's Dam". Lafferty subsequently described "The Meeting" as "one of the worst stories ever written by anybody, anywhere", and stated that "out of common decency" he would not name it.
