= Eurema's Dam =

1972 story by R. A. Lafferty

"Eurema's Dam" is a science fantasy story by R. A. Lafferty. It was first published in 1972 (although written in 1964) in the Robert Silverberg-edited anthology New Dimensions II, and subsequently republished in The Best Science Fiction of the Year #2 and Best Science Fiction Stories of the Year, Second Annual Collection (both 1973), in The Hugo Winners, Volume Three (1977), in Golden Gate and Other Stories (1982), in Space Odyssey (1988), and in Masterpieces: The Best Science Fiction of the Century (2001).

== Synopsis ==
Albert is "the last of the dolts": someone so stupid that he cannot learn to do simple things, and must instead invent hugely complex and powerful machines to do them for him. The story follows Albert from elementary school (where he conceals his inability to do arithmetic by inventing the calculator) to adulthood, where his inventions have brought him fame and fortune, ushered in a worldwide golden age, and earned him the Eurema Prize. Even at the peak of his success, however, Albert is still plagued by impostor syndrome, and by his inability to function without his inventions.

== Reception ==
"Dam" won the 1973 Hugo Award for Best Short Story, tied with Frederik Pohl's "The Meeting". It also won the 1975 Seiun Award for Best Translated Story

Mike Ashley considers "Dam" to be one of Lafferty's "most memorable" stories, even if it "isn't necessarily his most creative", while Dave Langford described it as "wild and woolly", and "[p]rophetic".

Black Gate called it "not great, just pretty good", and found it to be lacking "the true inspiration, the magic" of Lafferty's best stories.

Lafferty himself expressed puzzlement at "Dam"'s winning of the Hugo Award, stating that although he still considered it to be "a pleasant little story", he had had "four or five better stories published" in 1972.
