= Mike Glicksohn =

Co-editor of the science fiction fanzine Energumen

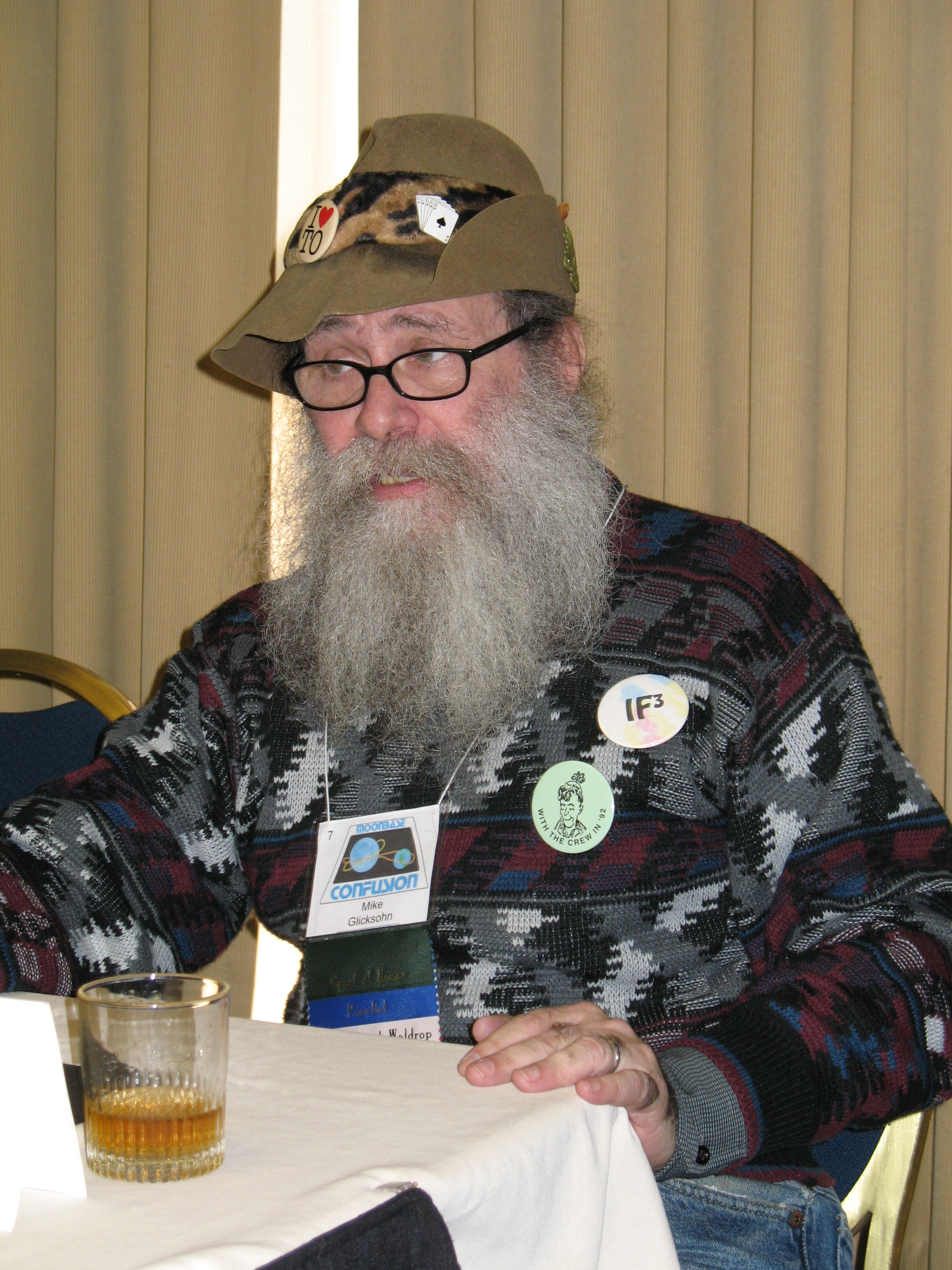
Glicksohn in 2007

Michael "Mike" David Glicksohn (May 20, 1946 – March 18, 2011, was a Canadian high school math teacher, science fiction fan and the co-editor of the science fiction fanzine Energumen.

== Early life ==
Glicksohn was born in Portsmouth, England, and emigrated to Canada.

== Teacher ==
Glicksohn taught mathematics at Humberside Collegiate Institute in Toronto for 34 years.

== SF fandom ==
Glicksohn attended his first World Science Fiction Convention in Cleveland in 1966. He also co-founded the Ontario Science Fiction Club (OSFiC) that year.

In 1969, while attending a science fiction convention in Boston, Glicksohn met fellow SF fan Susan Wood, at the time a student at Carleton University in Ottawa. They married and decided to publish an SF fanzine. The result was Energumen, a 28-page zine published in February 1970. It was nominated for the Hugo Award for Best Fanzine in 1971 and 1972, and won in 1973.

In 1973, Glicksohn and Wood broke up, and Energumen ceased publication after 15 issues.

Glicksohn continued to organize and be part of the SF fan world, and in 1975 was a Guest of Honour at Aussiecon 1, the 33rd World Science Fiction Convention. Glicksohn was nominated for an individual Hugo in 1977 for Best SF Fan Writer.

== Personal life and death ==
Glicksohn married Susan Manchester in 1993. In 2005, he was diagnosed with cancer and underwent many treatments. He died in Toronto of a stroke on 18 March 2011.

== Legacy ==
Glicksohn was posthumously inducted into the CSFFA Hall of Fame in 2026.
