= Energumen (magazine) =

Science fiction fanzine

- Cover of Issue No. 1
- Editor: Mike Glicksohn; Susan Wood
- Categories: Science fiction
- Founded: 1970
- Final issue: 1980
- Country: Canada
- Based in: Ottawa

Energumen was a science fiction fanzine edited by Mike Glicksohn and Susan Wood Glicksohn from 1970–1973.

== History ==
In 1969, science fiction fans Mike Glicksohn and Susan Wood met at a Boston SF convention. They were married in 1970, and from their home in Ottawa, decided to publish an SF fanzine. The result was Energumen, a 28-page zine published in February 1970. Over the next three years, Wood and Glicksohn published regularly. Contributors included Alicia Austin, John Baglow, John Bangsund, George Barr, Bill Bowers, Terry Carr, Phil Foglio, Jack Gaughan, Joe Haldeman, Joan Hanke-Woods, Jay Kinney, Dave Langford, Tim Kirk, Patrick Nielsen Hayden, Bill Rotsler, Bob Shaw, Stu Shiffman, Dan Steffan, Ted White, Gene Wolfe and artist Stephen Fabian.

It was nominated for the Hugo Award for Best Fanzine in 1971 and 1972, and won in 1973.

Glicksohn and Wood broke up in 1973, and Energumen ceased publication after Issue #15.

In 1980, Wood contacted Glicksohn with the suggestion that they produce a 16th issue on the 10th anniversary of Energumen #1. Work was well underway on the project when Wood suddenly died of a heart attack in November 1980. After some delay, Glicksohn continued preparing the special issue, which was published in September 1981 as "a tribute to the things [Wood] believed in and cared about."
