= Susan Wood (literary scholar) =

Canadian professor, author and editor (1948–1980)

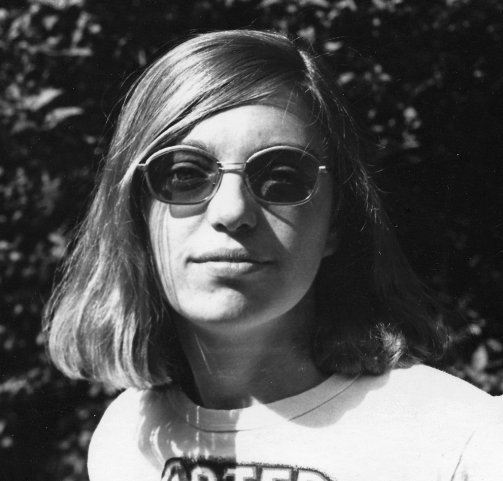
- Photo by Jeff Frane c. 1978
- Born: Susan Joan Wood; August 22, 1948; Ottawa, Ontario, Canada
- Died: November 12, 1980 (aged 32); Canada
- Spouse: Mike Glicksohn (m. 1970)

Academic background
- Education: Carleton University (BA, MA); University of Toronto (PhD)

Academic work
- Discipline: Literature
- Institutions: University of British Columbia
- Notable students: William Gibson
- Main interests: Science Fiction, Children's Literature, Canadian Literature

Susan Joan Wood (August 22, 1948 – November 12, 1980) was a Canadian literary critic, professor, author and science fiction fan and editor. She won several awards for her work.

== Early life and education ==
Wood was born in Ottawa, Canada. She attended Carleton University, where she earned her bachelor's degree in 1969 and a master's degree in 1970. She then moved to University of Toronto and earned a PhD in 1975.

== Science fiction fan ==
Wood discovered science fiction fandom while she was studying at Carleton. While attending the Boston SF convention Boskone IV in 1969, she met fellow fan Mike Glicksohn of Toronto. Wood and Glicksohn married in 1970. Wood subsequently sometimes published as Susan Wood Glicksohn until she and Glicksohn broke up in 1973.

=== Energunem ===
In 1970, Wood and Glicksohn founded and published the science fiction fanzine Energumen, which continued for 15 issues. It won the 1973 Hugo Award for Best Fanzine. When Wood and Glicksohn broke up in 1973, Ergumenum ceased publication.

Wood and Glicksohn were co-guests of honor at the 1975 World Science Fiction Convention.

== Professor ==
After earning her PhD in 1975, Wood joined the English Department at the University of British Columbia and taught Canadian literature, science fiction and children's literature.

While teaching courses in science fiction at UBC, one of her students was William Gibson; his first published story, "Fragments of a Hologram Rose", was originally written as an assignment in the class.

== SF critic ==
Wood published a great deal of trenchant criticism of the SF field, both in her own zines Aspidistra and Amor, and in more formal venues. She received three Hugo Awards for Best Fan Writer, in 1974, 1977, and 1981.

In 1976 Wood was instrumental in organizing the first feminist panel at a science fiction convention, at MidAmericon (that year's WorldCon). The reaction to this helped lead to the founding of A Women's APA and of WisCon.

From January to October 1978, she was the Vancouver editor of the Pacific Northwest Review of Books, and also edited a special science fiction/fantasy issue of Room of One's Own.

== Personal life and death ==
Wood unexpectedly died 12 November 1980 at the age of 32. A coroner's inquest found the cause of death was a massive heart attack.

Energumen #16, featuring Wood and Glicksohn on cover. Art by Derek Carter

== Legacy ==
Archives of some of Wood's papers are available in the library of the University of British Columbia.

A memorial scholarship fund at Carleton University was established after her death, funded in part by donations from science fiction fandom and from the sale of parts of her collection of science fiction art.

Wood and Glicksohn were planning a special 16th edition of Energumen when Wood died. Glicksohn continued, making the issue, published in September 1981, "a tribute to the things [Wood] believed in and cared about." The lighthearted cover art by Derek Carter shows Glicksohn and Wood emerging from a stack of old issues while readers try to run away.
