= Q strip (magazine) =

Publication information
- Publisher: Mentor d.o.o.
- Schedule: Periodically
- Format: Ongoing series
- Publication date: 2003 - 2013
- No. of issues: 22
- Editor: Darko Macan

Q strip was a Croatian comic book magazine edited by Darko Macan. It specializes in good quality Croatian comics which are often accompanied by notable comics from all over the world. The first issue was released on 18 July 2003. The last issue was released in 2013.

== Contents ==
Q strip featured a mix of Croatian comics and quality comics from around the world.

=== Notable series ===
- Papak (known in French as Guerre et match) by Frano Petruša (2007-2010), published 2010 in hardcover by Fibra, and in French by Dargaud.

== Formats ==
Q strip issues 1-17 were printed in A4 format. Issues 21-25 were printed in B5 format.

== Graphic novels and specials ==
- Q12a (2007) "Entropola" (Ivan Marušić)
- Q14a (2007) "Ninđa!" (Filip Kelava)
- Q16a (2008) "Mišo" (Darko Macan)
- Q18a (2010) "Corpseman čovjek/leš" (Maja Karačić and Ivan Svaguša)
- Q19a (2010) "Ukleti vitez 1: Crna šuma" (Darko Macan, David Petrina, Predrag Ginevski etc.)
- Q21a (2011) "Jack Seaborn 1: Mirna jesen u Coloradu" (Darko Macan, Bane Kerac, Branko Plavšić, Miodrag Ivanović etc.)
- Q22a (2008) "Sergej - Stare priče" (Darko Macan)
- Q23a (2011) "Gertrud Adenauer" (Dario Arana)
- Q24a (2009) "Godina gunđanja" (David Lovrić)
- Q25a (2010) "Gnom de Monde" (Ivan Marušić)
- Q strip special "Crni Popaj" (Sjepan Bartolić)

== Contributors ==
Notable Q strip contributors include:

- Sjepan Bartolić
- Edvin Biuković
- Igor Kordej
- Darko Macan
- Frano Petruša
- Goran Sudžuka
- Tonči Zonjić
