= Tonči Zonjić =

Comic book artist, writer, and illustrator

- Born: April 13, 1986 (age 40) Metković, Croatia
- Areas: Cartoonist, Writer, Penciller, Artist, Inker, Letterer, Colourist
- Notable works: The Immortal Iron Fist; The Jake Ellis series Lobster Johnson; Star Wars: The Last Jedi; Skulldigger and Skeleton Boy
- Collaborators: John Arcudi, Kathryn Immonen, Darko Macan, Nathan Edmondson

Tonči Zonjić is a Croatian comic book artist, writer and illustrator living in Toronto, Canada. He is best known for his work on Mike Mignola's Lobster Johnson series, and the Eisner Award-nominated Jake Ellis series. He designed the Praetorian Guards in Star Wars: The Last Jedi (Episode VIII).

== Early life ==
Zonjić grew up in Opuzen, Croatia. He developed an interest in comics through the work of Edvin Biuković and Darko Macan. After high school, he moved to Zagreb where he studied Animation and New Media at the Academy of Fine Arts.

== Career ==
Zonjić started out as an illustrator at the age of 15, publishing a cover for the magazine Futura, and got into comics by creating a fanzine called Pipci! (Tentacles!) in 2004. His first full finished book - an educational story about sea diving for kids that he coloured and lettered himself - completed in 2006, was published only in 2021. In Croatia, he worked on several projects with Darko Macan as well as storyboards, advertisements, book covers, weekly newspaper portraits for Vecernji List and various other comic strips.

While still a university student, Zonjić entered the American market in 2008 as one of the artists for Marvel's The Immortal Iron Fist series by Ed Brubaker and Matt Fraction.

In 2009 and 2010 he drew graphic novels from scripts by Roberto Aguire-Sacasa (Marvel Divas) and Kathryn Immonen (Heralds), as well as shorter stories with popular characters (Loki, Superman, Daredevil, Madman).

With Nathan Edmondson, he co-created Who is Jake Ellis?, a graphic novel which was nominated for the 2012. Eisner Award for the Best Limited Series, as well as its sequel, Where is Jake Ellis?. The series was optioned for a movie adaptation in 2013. by Harry Potter director David Yates.

Concurrently with the Jake Ellis series, in 2010. Zonjić was hired as the main artist on Mike Mignola's Lobster Johnson series, written by John Arcudi, which expanded on the character introduced in Hellboy: Conqueror Worm. Both Arcudi and Zonjić remained on the book until 2018, and the complete series was collected in two oversized omnibus editions in 2022 and 2023.

Between 2019 and 2021 Zonjić was the artist on Jeff Lemire's Skulldigger and Skeleton Boy, part of the Black Hammer Universe.

Another notable comics work in the same period was as one of the contributors adapting director Duncan Jones' movie script MADI: Once Upon a Time in the Future into a standalone graphic novel.

In addition to comics interiors, Zonjić has continued to produce covers for Marvel, DC Comics, Dark Horse Comics, Skybound, Boom! studios, Archaia, Valiant, ONI comics, Tiny Onion, and other publishers.

== Movie work ==
Zonjić was part of the costume department on Star Wars Episode VIII: The Last Jedi, under costume designer Michael Kaplan, and designed the iconic Praetorian Guards, among other things.

He also contributed to SOLO: A Star Wars Story, for costume designers Glyn Dillon (The Batman), and David Crossman (Star Wars, 1917).

== Personal life ==
Zonjić lives in Toronto, Ontario, Canada.

== Bibliography ==
Interior comic work includes:

- Q strip (with Darko Macan (except for #21), anthology):
  - "Slatka" (back cover strip, in #12, 2006)
  - "Port Silver" (in #13-14 and 16-17, 2006–2007)
  - "Mono Johnson: Milijun" (script and art, in #21, 2007)
- The Immortal Iron Fist (with Ed Brubaker and Matt Fraction, Marvel):
  - "The Seven Capital Cities of Heaven: Round 6" (with David Aja and Kano, in #13, 2008)
  - "The Seven Capital Cities of Heaven: Round 7" (with Kano and Clay Mann, in #14, 2008)
  - "Escape from the Eighth City: Chapter 2" (with Travel Foreman and Timothy Green II, in #23, 2009)
- Hrvatski Velikani Volume 2: "Nikola Tesla" (with Darko Macan, anthology graphic novel, Astoria, 2008)
- Daredevil vol. 2 #115: "Lady Bullseye: Conclusion" (with Ed Brubaker and Michael Lark, Marvel, 2009)
- Popgun Volume 3: "Ever Upward" (script and art, anthology graphic novel, Image, 2009)
- Marvel Divas #1-4 (with Roberto Aguirre-Sacasa, Marvel, 2009)
- Dark Reign: The Cabal: "Loki: Dinner with Doom" (with Peter Milligan, anthology one-shot, Marvel, 2009)
- Superman 80-Page Giant vol. 2 #1: "Patience-Centered Care" (with Kathryn Immonen, anthology, DC Comics, 2010)
- Heralds #1-4 (with Kathryn Immonen, James Harren and Emma Ríos, Marvel, 2010)
- JSA 80-Page Giant: "Ignorance is Bliss" (with Justin Peniston, anthology one-shot, DC Comics, 2010)
- Madman: All-New Giant-Size Super Ginchy Special!: "Bang!" (script and art, anthology one-shot, Image, 2011)
- Jake Ellis (with Nathan Edmondson, Image):
  - Who is Jake Ellis? #1-5 (2011)
  - Where is Jake Ellis? #1-5 (with Jordan Gibson (#5), 2012–2015)
- Lobster Johnson (with Mike Mignola and John Arcudi, Dark Horse):
  - The Burning Hand #1-5 (2012)
  - Caput Mortuum (one-shot, 2012)
  - Get the Lobster! #1-5 (2013–2014)
  - Metal Monsters of Midtown #1-3 (2016)
  - The Pirate's Ghost #1-3 (2017)
- Zabava za celu porodicu #25: "O ljubavi (i još ponekim demonima)" (with Vladimir Tadić, co-feature, Lavirint, 2012)
- Dracula World Order: The Beginning (with Ian Brill, Rahsan Ekedal, Gabriel Hardman and Declan Shalvey, one-shot, 2012)
- Zero #9: "Marina" (with Ales Kot, Image, 2014)
- Think of a City page 35 (script and art, Internet art project, 2015)
- Edge of Spider-Geddon #3: "Spider-Ben and Petey" (with Jason Latour, Marvel, 2018)
- Hellboy Winter Special #3: "The Empty Chair" (script and art, Dark Horse, 2018)
- MADI: Once Upon a Time in the Future (with Duncan Jones and Alex de Campi, Z2 Comics, 2020)
- Skulldigger + Skeleton Boy #1-6 (with Jeff Lemire, Dark Horse, 2019–2021)

=== Covers only ===
- Starborn #5 (Boom! Studios, 2011)
- Betrayal of the Planet of the Apes #1 (Boom! Studios, 2011)
- Dark Horse Presents vol. 2 #11 (Dark Horse, 2012)
- The Mystery Boys #2 (Dead Universe, 2012)
- The Creep #3 (Dark Horse, 2012)
- Lobster Johnson (Dark Horse):
  - Prayer of Neferu #1 (2012)
  - A Scent of Lotus #1-2 (2013)
  - A Chain Forged in Life #1 (2015)
  - The Glass Mantis #1 (2015)
  - The Forgotten Man #1 (2016)
  - Garden of Bones #1 (2017)
  - Mangekyō #1 (2017)
- Zero #14 (Image, 2015)
- Last Sons of America #1-4 (Boom! Studios, 2015–2016)
- The Astonishing Ant-Man #11 (Marvel, 2016)
- Ninja-K #1-3, 5-9 (Valiant, 2017–2018)
- Shadowman vol. 5 #1-11 (Valiant, 2018–2019)
- Crimson Lotus #1-5 (Dark Horse, 2018–2019)
- Incursion #1-4 (Valiant, 2019)
- Black Badge #8 (Boom! Studios, 2019)
- Pope Hats #6 (AdHouse Books, 2019)
- Star Wars: Age of Resistance – Captain Phasma #1 (Marvel, 2019)
- Strange Skies Over East Berlin #1 (Boom! Studios, 2019)
- The Visitor #4 (Valiant, 2020)
- Fire Power #12 (Skybound, 2021)
- Jonna and the Unpossible Monsters #1 (ONI Press, 2021)
- The Killer: Affairs of the State #5 (Archaia, 2021)
- Damn them All (Boom! Studios, 2022)
- House of Slaughter #13 (Boom! Studios, 2022)
- Little Monsters #2 (Image comics, 2022)
- Shock Shop #2 (Dark Horse, 2022)
- That Texas Blood #19 (Image comics, 2022)
- The Brother of All Men #1 (Aftershock, 2022)
- The Closet #3 (Image comics, 2022)
- The Walking Dead #50 (Image comics, 2022)
- Young Hellboy: Assault on Castle Death #1 (Dark Horse, 2022)
- Black Hammer: The End #4 (Dark Horse, 2023)
- Ghostlore #1 (Boom! Studios, 2023)
- GRIM #11 (Boom! Studios, 2023)
- Something is Killing the Children #33 (Boom! Studios, 2023)
- The Expanse: Dragon Tooth #7 (Boom! Studios, 2023)
- Universal Monsters: Dracula #1 (Skybound, 2023)
- The Oddly Pedestrian Life of Christopher Chaos #6, 8 (Dark Horse, 2024)
- Top Secret Service (Dark Horse, 2024)
- Our Bones Dust #3 (Image Comics, 2024)
