= Grendel Tales =

Comic book series

Grendel Tales is a comic book series published by Dark Horse Comics.

== Contents ==
Grendel Tales is a creator-owned comic book from Matt Wagner, who worked with other artists and writers to produce the title.

== Publication history ==
Grendel Tales is an irregular series of stories by other writers and artists set in the world Wagner had created. It was intended to follow the original comic series, but Comico's bankruptcy derailed this plan (Grendel #40 did contain a short story by Steven T. Seagle and Ho Che Anderson, starting this idea). Grendel Tales finally began in 1993, published by Dark Horse as a series of miniseries.

- Four Devils, One Hell by James Robinson and Teddy Kristiansen (1993) – This story features the skull of Hunter Rose. The skull has a hole in the forehead, though it is not explained in the story why this is. The reason is revealed in the 1996 Batman/Grendel crossover.
- Devil's Hammer by Rob Walton (1994)
- The Devil in Our Midst by Steven T. Seagle and Paul Grist (1994)
- Devils and Deaths by Darko Macan and Edvin Biuković (1994)
- Homecoming by Patrick McEown (1994)
- Devil's Choices by Darko Macan and Edvin Biuković (1995)
- The Devil May Care by Terry Laban and Peter Doherty (1995)
- The Devil's Apprentice by Jeffrey Lang and Steve Lieber (1997)

== Reception ==
Larry Snelly reviewed Grendel Tales in White Wolf Inphobia #53 (March, 1995) and stated that "I'm constantly impressed by the array of good artists and writers with whom Matt Wagner works. It comes as no surprise considering what a brilliant writer/artist he is, but to achieve such consistency is quite a feat."

Grendel Tales was nominated for the 1994 Eisner Award for Best Painter/Digital Artist and the 1995 Eisner Award for Best Penciller/Inker or Penciller/Inker Team, and was nominated for the Eisner Award for Best Editor in 1994 and 1995.
