= Patsy Walker =

Marvel Comics character

Patsy Walker The Hellcat
- Cover of Marvel Comics Presents #2 (October 2007). Art by Stuart Immonen

Publication information
- Publisher: Marvel Comics
- First appearance: As Patsy Walker: Miss America Magazine #2 (Nov. 1944); As Hellcat: The Avengers #144 (Feb. 1976)
- Created by: As Patsy Walker: Stuart Little; Ruth Atkinson; As Hellcat: Steve Englehart; George Pérez

In-story information
- Full name: Patricia Walker
- Species: Human mutate
- Team affiliations: Defenders; Avengers; Lady Liberators; Legion of the Unliving
- Partnerships: Buzz Baxter / Mad Dog; Daimon Hellstrom; Tony Stark / Iron Man
- Notable aliases: Hellcat; The Cat
- Abilities: Superhuman strength, agility, speed, endurance, and reflexes; Ability to extend nails into sharp claws; Various psionic powers; Skilled martial artist and gymnast; Equipment include wrist-mounted retractable claws and grappling hooks

Patricia "Patsy" Walker is a superhero appearing in American comic books published by Marvel Comics. Created by Stuart Little and Ruth Atkinson, Patsy Walker first appeared in Miss America Magazine #2 (November 1944), published by Marvel precursor Timely Comics, and became Hellcat in The Avengers #144 (February 1976). She premiered as the star of a teen romantic-comedy series, and was later integrated into Marvel superhero franchises such as the Avengers and the Defenders as the Hellcat.

Following her reintroduction as Hellcat, the character has been described as one of Marvel's most notable female heroes.

Rachael Taylor portrayed Trish Walker in the Marvel Cinematic Universe (MCU) series Jessica Jones (2015–2019), Luke Cage (2016), and The Defenders (2017).

== Publication history ==
=== Teen-humor heroine ===
Created by writer Stuart Little and artist Ruth Atkinson, Patsy Walker first appeared in Miss America Magazine #2 (cover-dated November 1944), published by Marvel precursor Timely Comics. Redheaded Patsy Walker, her parents Stanley and Betty, her boyfriend Robert "Buzz" Baxter, and her raven-haired friendly rival Hedy Wolfe appeared from the 1940s through 1967 in issues of Miss America, Teen Comics, Girls' Life, and the namesake teen-humor series Patsy Walker, as well as in the spin-offs Patsy and Hedy, Patsy and Her Pals, and the single-issue A Date with Patsy. Attesting to its quiet popularity, Patsy Walker (along with Millie the Model and Kid Colt, Outlaw) was among the very few titles published continuously by Marvel from the 1940s Golden Age of Comic Books, through Marvel's 1950s iteration as Atlas Comics, and into the 1960s Silver Age of Comic Books.

Future Mad magazine cartoonist and Mad Fold-in creator Al Jaffee wrote and drew most of the early issues of Patsy Walker, several of which included Mad founding editor Harvey Kurtzman's highly stylized "Hey Look!" one-page humor strips. Jaffee was succeeded by Al Hartley, who later went to Archie Comics and produced many Christian comic books starring Archie characters and others. Patsy and Her Pals was drawn by Morris Weiss.

The humor-comic version of Patsy (left) in Patsy and Hedy #72 (Oct. 1960), a spinoff of the flagship title Patsy Walker. Cover art by Al Hartley.

Following Patsy's high-school graduation in issue #116 (Aug. 1964), the title switched from humor to become a young career-gal romantic adventure. Patsy Walker lasted through issue #124 (Dec. 1965), with Patsy and Hedy outlasting it to its own #110 (Feb. 1967).

Patsy and Hedy made a cameo appearance in Fantastic Four Annual #3 (Oct. 1965), which established them in the Marvel Universe. The superhero-team comic The Defenders #89 (Nov. 1980) reimagined the earlier stories as fictional works published within the fictional world of Marvel's superheroes and written by Patsy's mother, Dorothy Walker, as inspired by Patsy's own life and friends. The Patsy Walker profile in Marvel Legacy: The 1960s Handbook #1 (Feb. 2006) establishes that Walker indeed experienced many of the events from these stories.

Patsy Walker #95 – together with the fantasy and science-fiction anthology Journey into Mystery #69 (both June 1961) – are the first modern comic books labeled "Marvel Comics", with each showing an "MC" box on its cover.

=== Hellcat ===
The Beast feature in Amazing Adventures #13 (July 1972) re-introduced Patsy Walker as a woman who wanted to be a superhero. Writer Steve Englehart recalled that Walker's cameo in Fantastic Four Annual #3 had:

struck my fan's eye by including her in the Marvel Universe. ... I thought it would be cool to bring her in as a real character, with things to do. Part of my 'training' as a Marvel writer was writing romance stories and Westerns, but Patsy [Walker] was defunct as a comic by the time I got there. ... Still, as a fan, I had collected everything Marvel, including Patsy Walker and Patsy and Hedy ... so I knew them as characters.

Because the Beast feature was dropped from Amazing Adventures just three issues later, the storyline with Patsy Walker was temporarily abandoned. Walker was reintroduced in The Avengers #141 (November 1975), having resumed her maiden name of Walker, and accompanied the Avengers on a couple of adventures. Shortly thereafter, she adopted the name Hellcat, taking on superheroine Greer Grant Nelson's costume from her discontinued identity as The Cat. The name "Hellcat" itself had originally been proposed for Nelson. The suit's look was later slightly adapted.

In 2010, Englehart recalled:

I wasn't real interested in the Cat. I read the books and they seemed like pandering, frankly — not very good stories written to appeal to a demographic. Once [Patsy] entered the [Marvel Universe], met the Beast, confronted her husband — all that began to change the Patsy I had inherited to someone a little more savvy. By the time she became the Hellcat, she could stand back far enough to see the ironies in her taking over a feminist creation. But she was really more about jumping into the superhero pool than standing back. ... She didn't muse on the irony; she wanted to be a heroine.

Hellcat joined the superhero team the Defenders in issue #44 (Feb. 1977). After several adventures with the group, she met the supernatural adventurer Daimon Hellstrom, the Son of Satan, in The Defenders #92 (Feb. 1981). They married in The Defenders #125 and became husband-and-wife occult investigators, but Hellstrom's demonic nature asserted itself, and Walker was driven first mad and then, in Hellstorm: Prince of Lies #14 (May 1994), to suicide. Through Hellstrom's manipulation of the superhero Hawkeye, she was resurrected in Thunderbolts Annual 2000, a summer annual of the superhero-team comic Thunderbolts, and returned to Earth with new abilities acquired while in Hell. The story, which began in Thunderbolts Annual 2000, concluded in Avengers Annual 2000. A three-issue Hellcat miniseries (Sept.–Nov. 2000) took place immediately following the events in Thunderbolts Annual 2000 and Avengers Annual 2000. Briefly adopting a new costume and then returning to her traditional yellow outfit, she rejoined the Defenders in a short-lived revival series, The Defenders (vol. 2) #1–12 (March 2001 – Feb. 2002).

After appearing in occasional guest roles, Hellcat had starring roles between 2007 and 2009, thanks to husband-wife artist-writer team Stuart Immonen and Kathryn Immonen. With the impending relaunch of Marvel Comics Presents, Stuart was asked by editor Nick Lowe if he wanted to do a Hellcat story, which was spread across the title's first four issues (Sept.–Dec. 2007). Marvel remained open for a Hellcat miniseries, and out of what Kathryn first conceived as a "Hellcat Christmas Special", inspired by endurance car races in Mongolia and research on the Inuit, came the five-issue miniseries Patsy Walker: Hellcat (Sept. 2008–Feb. 2009), drawn by David Lafuente with covers by Stuart. A tie-in to the Avengers 50-State Initiative, it features Hellcat being assigned to watch over Alaska. Following this, she was an ensemble star and narrator alongside the superheroines Firestar, the Black Cat, and Photon, in the miniseries Marvel Divas #1–4 (Sept.-Dec. 2009), which writers Roberto Aguirre-Sacasa and Tonci Zonjic had pitched it to Marvel editors as "Sex and the City in the Marvel Universe".

Walker became part of the All-New Marvel NOW! event in She-Hulk (vol. 3) #2, when Jennifer Walters started her own law firm. Walters hired Patsy as her private investigator, who uses her Hellcat alias on assignments.

The All-New, All-Different Marvel line in 2015 led to a new ongoing Patsy Walker title, Patsy Walker, A.K.A. Hellcat!. Written by Kate Leth and drawn by Brittney Williams, it attempted to combine the romance and superhero comics with a more comedic approach, which Leth compared to a Saturday-morning cartoon. In it, Walker tries to establish a job agency for super-powered people following her dismissal by the She-Hulk, and also recover the rights to old Patsy Walker comics which have been republished by Hedy. In February 2017, Leth announced that the series would be ending that April with its 17th issue. She praised Marvel for "giv[ing] us space to wrap up the story exactly how we wanted in 3 volumes".

Hellcat received a limited series in 2023, written by Christopher Cantwell. The series follows Hellcat as she is accused of murder and is pursued by the Sleepwalkers.

== Fictional character biography ==
After growing up in suburban Centerville, graduating high school and marrying high-school sweetheart Robert "Buzz" Baxter, Patsy Walker becomes an assistant to scientist Hank McCoy, the mutant superhero Beast, who at that time was on hiatus from the X-Men. Estranged from her husband, now a U.S. Air Force colonel, Walker befriends McCoy, and, desiring to become a superhero, accompanies McCoy on a quest with the Avengers. She adopts a costume that formerly belonged to Greer Grant Nelson, the former masked adventuress the Cat, and takes on the name Hellcat.

=== Early superhero career, marriage, and suicide ===
After having used her natural athletic abilities and good instincts to rescue the Avengers, Walker is offered membership in the team. The cosmic adventurer Moondragon persuades Hellcat to decline and instead accompany her to Saturn's moon Titan for training in psychic ability and advanced martial arts. Walker's training is soon interrupted when she returns to Earth to assist the supernatural hero Doctor Strange, joining the Defenders in the process. Later Moondragon revokes her mind powers, mentioning Walker's ineffective use of them.

She meets her future husband Daimon Hellstrom, the Son of Satan, during the course of a quest with the Defenders. After learning that her mother had promised her soul to Satan, and briefly being lied to by the devil that he was her father, Walker reunites with her real father and marries Hellstrom. The two then retire from being superheroes. Ultimately, Hellstrom's demonic inheritance took possession of him and drove Walker insane. Institutionalized, she was driven to suicide by the otherworldly being Deathurge.

=== Resurrection, Civil War, and She-Hulk (vol. 3) ===
Trapped in Hell, Walker's spirit is used in a series of gladiatorial-like combat scenarios. There, she learns to develop and use her psychic powers. Hellstrom tricks the archer superhero Hawkeye into returning her spirit to Earth; Hawkeye believes he is retrieving his presumed-dead wife, Mockingbird, from the demonic lord Mephisto's realm. Resurrected and back on Earth, Walker retains the powers that she developed in Hell, and she is also able to manifest a costume at will. Once again a member of the Defenders, Hellcat focuses on combating occult evils, notably Nicholas Scratch, who had based himself in her hometown of Centerville, and the other-dimensional ruler Dormammu.

During the Civil War storyline, Hellcat registers with the government as a super-powered individual. She serves as one of the young superheroes' instructors at Camp Hammond. She was then assigned as the Avengers 50 State Initiative official superhero for Alaska, but eventually returned to New York City. Hellcat develops and maintains a deep friendship with the superheroes Firestar, the Black Cat, and Monica Rambeau, partly stemming from their support to Firestar, who develops and then survives breast disease.

Hellcat is later seen with the She-Hulk and facing personal problems. After a night of heavy drinking and partying, Hellcat and the She-Hulk invade a warehouse that A.I.M. was using as a hideout and defeat two agents wearing high tech suits. The She-Hulk then hires Hellcat as her private investigator to help with her economic situation. She then helps the She-Hulk in protecting Kristoff Vernard, the son of Doctor Doom, who was trying to defect to the U.S. She is later seen talking with Tigra about a case involving a lawsuit but ends up fighting her when she mentions the plaintiff's name, George Saywitz. After recovering in a hospital, she helps the She-Hulk and Hank Pym in a recovery mission to save Reza, the partner of inventor Rufus Randall, to settle an argument between them over a device known as the Shrinko, which they were planning to sell to Pym. They later wind up helping Steve Rogers, the original Captain America, with a lawsuit involving a murder that happened in 1940.

=== Patsy Walker, A.K.A. Hellcat! and Civil War II ===
As part of the "All-New, All-Different Marvel" line, She-Hulk eventually becomes unable to afford Hellcat as an investigator and fires her friend, which also forces Walker to move out of Walters' office building (the same place where Howard the Duck works). Walker moves to the Brooklyn apartment of Ian, an Inhuman who she met when he used his powers to steal from an armored truck. Ian gets a job with Walker's old friend Tom Hale (known as "Tubs" in the romance comics) and inspires her to open a work agency for other superpowered people. To her chagrin, Walker also learns that her old rival Hedy Wolfe has obtained the rights from Walker's late mother Dorothy to republish the Patsy Walker comics. With the help of the She-Hulk and Jessica Jones, Walker gets the rights back by proving that Dorothy was sedated and thus not in full mental capacities when she signed the comics off to Hedy, making it a void contract.

During the "Civil War II" storyline, Patsy Walker learns that the She-Hulk is in a coma at the Triskelion. America Chavez allows Patsy to visit her. After the visit, Patsy tells Howard the Duck and the other tenants about the She-Hulk's current condition, and moves her offices to where Jennifer operated as a lawyer.

Afterwards, Hedy dupes Patsy's ex-husbands Mad-Dog and Daimon Hellstrom into fighting her. Daimon sends Patsy to a dimension ruled by the demon Belial, who tries to bring Hellcat to his side. Patsy then confronts her former friend the Black Cat, now leading a gang of criminals. Patsy suddenly catches a cold that causes her to alter reality whenever she sneezes. After several disasters, Patsy accidentally makes a building disappear. Hedy then calls Patsy and reveals that she is dating the demon Belial, who helps Patsy overcome her grief over the She-Hulk and cures her of the cold. Patsy then receives a check for a big amount of money from the She-Hulk and takes Ian, Tom, and Jubilee to the mall. While shopping, they encounter two teenage girls pretending to be supervillains, who are revealed to be Patsy's biggest fans. Ian then figures out that the girls like each other and resolves their dispute. After that, Patsy expresses joy of how her life has changed.

== Powers and abilities ==
Hellcat possesses a superhuman level of physical abilities including enhanced strength, speed, reflexes, agility, endurance, and senses. She has different psionic powers due to Moondragon's Titanian technology, including telekinesis, sensing psychic phenomena, and the ability to cast mental illusions. Hellcat can change her nails into sharp claws. She is able to summon a magic cloak with enchanted properties at will that she uses to sense mystical phenomena or deflect mystical attacks. She uses retractable claws and grappling hooks on her wrists. Hellcat is a well-trained martial artist and gymnast.

== Reception ==
=== Critical reception ===
Peter Eckhardt of CBR.com called Hellcat one of the "best cat-themed superheroes in comics," writing, "Patsy Walker wasn't made to be a superhero. Created in 1944, Walker starred in humorous teenage girl-oriented comics like Miss America and Girls' Life. Her eponymous title was published continuously from the '40s until the '60s and Walker's trajectory turned towards superherodom. As Hellcat, Walker became a more feminist hero. She divorced her abusive husband, took (temporary) control of the stories that had been published using her name, and joined a superhero non-team, the Defenders, to battle unnatural evils. A humorous character with a compelling story, Hellcat remains one of Marvel's most fun felines."

=== Accolades ===
- In 2015, Entertainment Weekly ranked Hellcat 74th in their "Let's rank every Avenger ever" list.
- In 2017, Gizmodo ranked Hellcat 13th in their "Marvel Superheroes Who Basically Only Protect New York City" list.
- In 2018, CBR.com ranked Hellcat 17th in their "Marvel's 20 Most Seasoned Street-Level Heroes" list.
- In 2020, Sideshow ranked Hellcat 7th in their "Top-Ten Cat-Themed Comic Book Characters" list.
- In 2020, CBR.com ranked Hellcat 1st in their "Marvel: 10 Best Golden Age Heroines" list.
- In 2021, Screen Rant ranked Hellcat 9th in their "10 Best Versions Of Hawkeye From Marvel Comics" list.
- In 2021, CBR.com ranked Hellcat 4th in their "10 Best Members Of The Defenders" list.
- In 2022, Gizmodo ranked Hellcat 5th in their "12 Marvel Villains Who Should Have Been in Thunderbolts" list.
- In 2022, Screen Rant included Hellcat in their "10 Most Powerful Members Of The Lady Liberators" list, in their "10 Iconic New York City-Based Marvel Superheroes We Haven't Seen In The MCU" list, and in their "She-Hulk: 10 Comics Characters Who Should Appear In The Series" list.
- In 2022, CBR.com ranked Hellcat 4th in their "10 Most Powerful Members Of The Lady Liberators" list and 5th in their "10 Best Cat-Themed Superheroes In Comics" list.

== Literary reception ==
=== Volumes ===
==== Patsy Walker: Hellcat (2008) ====
According to Diamond Comic Distributors, Patsy Walker: Hellcat #1 was the 118th best selling comic book in July 2008. Patsy Walker: Hellcat #2 was the 151st best selling comic book in August 2008.

James Hunt of CBR.com called Patsy Walker: Hellcat #1 "enormously fun to read, soaked with character and humor," stating, "It really has been a while since Marvel released such a charming comic, especially one so clearly aimed at a different audience than most of their superhero fare. While it's early days for the miniseries, the strength of the first issue is practically enough to keep it running on goodwill for the remaining 4 issues. Not everyone is going to appreciate or understand the tone of "Hellcat," so the important thing now is to make sure it finds its way into the hands of those that will as soon as possible, because there's almost nothing else like it, and originality like this needs all the support it can get." Jesse Schedeen of IGN gave Patsy Walker: Hellcat #1 a grade of 8.8 out of 10, asserting, "Immonen has a delightfully bombastic writing style that carries you from page to page. There's nothing terribly realistic about Patsy's portrayal or the events in her life. The book almost reminds me of Nextwave, except the subversive humor is more subtle. Don't come into Patsy Walker: Hellcat expecting deep, nuanced characterization. Just expect to have plenty of fun, more than many series can offer in an entire arc. I was disappointed, though certainly not surprised, to learn that Stuart Immonen would not be returning to illustrate his wife's work. Luckily, David la Fuente is a more than capable replacement. His style perfectly captures the wonky tone and expressive, vibrant feel of the original story. As a fashion model, half of drawing Patsy Walker is capturing her many colorful outfits. Far too many artists have problems with rendering clothing not made of spandex. La Fuente is not one of them. It's a slow week, with only one Secret Invasion tie-in to be found. Take advantage of that and give Patsy Walker: Hellcat a shot."

==== Patsy Walker, A.K.A. Hellcat! (2015) ====
According to Diamond Comic Distributors, Patsy Walker, A.K.A. Hellcat! #1 was the 49th best selling comic book in December 2015. Patsy Walker, A.K.A. Hellcat! #1 was the 431st best selling comic book in 2015.

Chase Magnett of ComicBook.com gave Patsy Walker, A.K.A. Hellcat! #1 a grade of "B," saying, "The jokes and quick set up of a very large cast and lots of potential plotlines all work as well as they do largely because of Williams and Wilson's presentation. They make the crayon-colored business presentation pop and the humorously foreboding callbacks to Walker's teenage friends seem actually mysterious. Their delivery of each line and concept is so engaging that it's easy to re-read Patsy Walker, A.K.A. Hellcat #1, and wait for #2 to bring the same style and laughter, and the follow through on the premises established here." Jesse Schedeen of IGN gave Patsy Walker, A.K.A. Hellcat! #1 a grade of 6.7 out of 10, writing, "Patsy Walker, A.K.A. Hellcat! is a decent option for any reader who craves more of the lighthearted silliness of Marvel books like Howard the Duck or The Unbeatable Squirrel Girl. But despite the solid supporting cast and characterization, this book doesn't really do anything those other titles don't do better. This first issue moves slowly and has its clunky moments, but hopefully a clearer and more engaging conflict will emerge over time." Charles Pulliam-Moore of Gizmodo stated, "Oftentimes, when comics set out to tell stories that humanize superheroes who are off saving the universe, they get mired in drama that somehow manages to be both weirdly familiar but utterly unrelatable. When every story tries to be an epic tale about how a hero’s greatest struggle, it becomes easy to lose sight of how a world as sprawling as Marvel’s logically fits together. On some level, Marvel understands the intrinsic appeal of these kinds of focused stories that are a touch off the traditional “mainstream” comics path. But like Mockingbird, Vision, and Nighthawk, before it, Patsy Walker's coming to a premature end, seemingly because Marvel’s less interested in putting out thoughtful indies in an industry addicted to formulaic blockbusters. Patsy Walker isn’t a small story, or a simple one, but rather one with a solid focus on a couple of months in one woman’s during which some really important things happen around her. This is the storytelling that makes for characters that feel like real people and those are the kinds of characters that comics need more of."

==== Iron Man/Hellcat Annual (2022) ====
Jenna Anderson of ComicBook.com gave Iron Man/Hellcat Annual #1 a grade of 4.5 out of 5, asserting, "After Tony Stark's marriage proposal in Iron Man #20, the larger narrative to his and Patsy Walker's stories could have gone into a wide swath of directions – which makes this week's excellent Iron Man/Hellcat Annual an excellent, but unsurprising, triumph. The vast majority of the story puts the spotlight on Patsy, throwing her into a literally hellish confrontation with her past. It's always a joy to read Christopher Cantwell's essentially-solo stories for Patsy, and having her world be explored throughout this issue is an entertaining joy, especially when coupled with Ruairi Coleman's excellent art. This issue is definitely a turning point for both Tony and Patsy – and a great one at that."

== Other versions ==
=== Ultimate Marvel ===
Patsy Walker has appeared in Marvel Comics' Multiverse Ultimate Marvel imprint. In Ultimate Spider-Man, she first appears as a spokeswoman for a security firm, then as a swimsuit model for Maxim magazine, a talk show hostess, presenting a biography on Doctor Strange, and finally interviewing Norman Osborn. In addition, she appeared in Ultimate Marvel Team-Up, hosting an instructional video for the Baxter Building. Patsy assumes her Hellcat identity in Ultimates and was a founding member of the ill-fated Defenders. Walker later shows up with the Defenders in Ultimate Comics: New Ultimates, powered up by Loki and sporting a leopard-like appearance.

=== Heroes Reborn (1996) ===
In the Heroes Reborn universe, Hellcat appears as a member of the Avengers. This version of the character sports a more bestial "werecat" appearance similar to Tigra. Envious of the Scarlet Witch's beauty, she is manipulated by Loki into siding with Hawkeye against the rest of the team. Patsy takes possession of the Scarlet Witch's body, but is killed after Agatha Harkness forcibly expels her essence.

== In other media ==
=== Television ===
Rachael Taylor as Trish Walker in the Netflix television series Jessica Jones

Patricia "Trish" Walker appears in Netflix series set in the Marvel Cinematic Universe, portrayed by Rachael Taylor as an adult and by Catherine Blades as a teenager. This version is a former child star of the in-universe television series It's Patsy, the best friend of Jessica Jones, the host of the radio show Trish Talk, and the daughter of Dorothy Walker.

- First appearing in Jessica Jones, she aids the titular character in combating Kilgrave, but becomes jealous of her powers during the first season. By the end of the second season, Walker volunteers to undergo experimentation carried out by Dr. Karl Malus. Despite nearly dying in the process, she acquires enhanced athleticism, reflexes, agility, stamina, balance, durability, and night vision, as well as razor-sharp nails. In between the second and third seasons, she began training excessively and used her newly acquired powers to become proficient in acrobatics, gymnastics, parkour, and Krav Maga while also seeking to develop her investigative skills like Jones. Throughout the aforementioned third season, Walker goes from being a vigilante to a self-described "supervillain". Consumed by the loss of her mother at the hands of serial killer Gregory Sallinger, she gives in to her rage and begins brutally attacking, later murdering, individuals that she deems as evil regardless of their actions or motivations under the belief that it is to make the world a better place. After murdering Sallinger, Walker has a confrontation with Jones, who is forced to apprehend Walker and turn her over to the authorities. Understanding what it means to be the "bad guy", Walker is sent by helicopter to the Raft.
- Walker makes a voiceover cameo in the Luke Cage episode "Suckas Need Bodyguards", fielding calls from listeners on Trish Talk.
- Walker appears in The Defenders. After the first season of Jessica Jones, she appears expressing concern about Jones's failure to treat Kilgrave's death as a significant victory. Following an artificial earthquake triggered by the Hand's rocks in the city, Walker attempts to report what happened, only to be silenced by her superiors, who intend to cover it up. Later, when the Hand begins targeting the heroes and their loved ones, Alexandra Murakami's henchman tries to kill Walker, but Jones and Daredevil manage to defeat him. While staying with Malcolm at Misty Knight's compound, Walker forms a bond with New York Bulletin reporter Karen Page, as they connect through their respective relationships with Jones and Murdock.

=== Video games ===
- Hellcat appears as an unlockable playable character in Lego Marvel's Avengers.
- Hellcat appears in Marvel Avengers Alliance.
- Hellcat appears as an unlockable playable character in Marvel Avengers Academy, voiced by Charlotte Ann. This version is a member of the Defenders.
- Hellcat appears as an unlockable playable character in Marvel Future Fight.
- Hellcat appears as an unlockable playable character in Marvel Puzzle Quest.

== Collected editions ==
Title	Material collected	Publication date	ISBN
Patsy Walker: Hellcat	Patsy Walker: Hellcat #1–5 and material from Marvel Comics: Presents #1–4	June 2009	978-0785133797
Marvel Divas	Marvel Divas #1–4	January 2010	978-0785131779
Patsy Walker, A.K.A. Hellcat! Vol. 1: Hooked on a Feline	Patsy Walker, A.K.A. Hellcat! #1–6	June 2016	978-1302900359
Patsy Walker, A.K.A. Hellcat! Vol. 2: Don't Stop Me-Ow	Patsy Walker, A.K.A. Hellcat! #7–12	January 2017	978-1302900366
Patsy Walker, A.K.A. Hellcat! Vol. 3: Careless Whisker(s)	Patsy Walker, A.K.A. Hellcat! #13–17	August 2017	978-1302906627
