= Ghosted (comics) =

Comic book series by Joshua Williamson

Publication information
- Publisher: Image Comics
- Schedule: Monthly
- Genre: Action, Supernatural, Crime, Heist, Horror, Thriller
- Publication date: July 2013 to May 2015
- No. of issues: 20
- Main character: Jackson Winters

Creative team
- Written by: Joshua Williamson
- Artist(s): Goran Sudžuka, Miroslav Mrva

Ghosted is a supernatural comic book series created by Joshua Williamson. The first issue released on January 10, 2013, through Image Comics.

== Synopsis ==
The series follows Jackson Winters, a man who is capable of stealing anything. His last attempt at theft resulted in the gruesome deaths of his teammates and landed him in jail. He's broken out of prison by an extremely wealthy man who wants him to steal a ghost from a house that is rumored to be haunted, due to it being the site of multiple cult murders. Winters agrees to the job, but only if he can assemble his own team.

== Reception ==
Critical reception for Ghosted has been positive. Comic Book Resources and IGN both praised the work overall, and IGN commented that "Even when Williamson employs the tired old method of showing Jackson going around to recruit a team of supernatural experts to help him with the job, it works wonderfully because of Jackson’s no-BS attitude."
