= Monica Rambeau =

Marvel Comics superhero

- Monica Rambeau / Photon. Textless cover to Monica Rambeau: Photon #1 (December 2022). Art by Lucas Werneck.

Publication information
- Publisher: Marvel Comics
- First appearance: As Captain Marvel: The Amazing Spider-Man Annual #16 (October 1982); As Photon: Avengers Unplugged #5 (June 1996); As Pulsar: New Thunderbolts #9 (August 2005); As Spectrum: Mighty Avengers #1 (November 2013)
- Created by: Roger Stern; John Romita Jr.

In-story information
- Full name: Monica Rambeau
- Species: Human mutate
- Team affiliations: Mighty Avengers; S.W.O.R.D. Nextwave; Avengers; Ultimates; Defenders
- Notable aliases: Captain Marvel; Monica Marvel; Sun Goddess; Lady of Light; Spectrum; Daystar; Photon; Pulsar
- Abilities: Ability to convert into any form of energy within the electromagnetic spectrum and travel in energy form through the vacuum of space; Energy absorption, generation, and manipulation; Ability to travel at the speed of light; Size alteration; Intangibility; Flight

Monica Rambeau is a superhero appearing in American comic books published by Marvel Comics. Created by writer Roger Stern and artist John Romita Jr., the character first appeared in The Amazing Spider-Man Annual #16 (October 1982). Monica Rambeau gained her superpowers after being bombarded by extra-dimensional energy produced by an energy disruptor weapon. She later joined and eventually became leader of the Avengers for a time. She was also a member of Nextwave and the latest Ultimates team. The character has also been known as Captain Marvel, Photon, Pulsar, and Spectrum at various points in her history.

Monica Rambeau appears in the Marvel Cinematic Universe films Captain Marvel (2019) and The Marvels (2023) as well as the television miniseries WandaVision (2021), portrayed by Teyonah Parris as an adult and by Akira Akbar as a child.

== Development ==
=== Concept and creation ===
Talking about the visual features of the character, John Romita Jr. noted that, originally, the character was intended to look like actress Pam Grier, but her appearance was changed before publication:

I just took some reference on Pam Grier, because I always loved her, and at the last moment somebody said that, "Well, we need to use this woman, here," because they thought maybe Pam Grier wasn't as good-looking as the model they found. It was fine, because by the time she got done by other artists, it ended up looking like the generic black character, anyway.

=== Publication history ===
Monica Rambeau debuted in The Amazing Spider-Man Annual #16 (October 1982), created by writer Roger Stern and artist John Romita Jr.

Following her debut, the character appeared throughout the entirety of Stern's five-year run on The Avengers, ultimately becoming the team's leader, before making numerous appearances as a reserve member after her departure from active duty. Two one-shot titles, both written by Dwayne McDuffie and illustrated by Mark D. Bright, followed. She also starred in Avengers: Unplugged #5 (1996). She returned in The Avengers (vol. 3) with sporadic appearances between issues #1–59. During this run, she also appeared in Avengers: Infinity #1–4 (September–December 2000), Maximum Security #2–3 (both January 2001), Thor (vol. 2) #30 (January 2001) and the Avengers Annual in 2001.

Following a cameo in Great Lakes Avengers #1 and New Thunderbolts #8–9, she appeared in Order #5–6. She starred in Nextwave #1–12. Following the cancellation of that series, Rambeau was seen briefly in Civil War, She-Hulk, and as a main character in Marvel Divas #1–4 and Heralds #1–5. She appears Iron Age #1 (2011), Captain Marvel #7–8, Journey into Mystery #649, and Age of Ultron.

In 2009, Rambeau appeared in the limited series, Marvel Divas (partly inspired by Sex and the City). She was one of the main characters, alongside Black Cat, Hellcat, and Firestar.

Starting in September 2013, she appeared as one of the lead characters in the Marvel NOW! relaunch of Mighty Avengers, she acted as the team's field leader under the new codename Spectrum.

She was part of the 2015's Ultimates team, written by Al Ewing and drawn by Kenneth Rocafort, the team consisted of Monica Rambeau, Black Panther, Blue Marvel, Miss America, and Captain Marvel. In Marvel NOW! (2016), the Ultimates broke up but are later reunited and asked to become the heralds of Galactus, who is now the Lifebringer of Worlds. The second volume ended at a special #100 issue, and it includes an appearance of the original Ultimates team.

She was a major character in the Avengers weekly story-arc Avengers: No Road Home, alongside Hawkeye, Hercules, Hulk, Scarlet Witch, Vision, Voyager and Rocket Raccoon. It was meant to be a spiritual successor to previous Avengers weekly story-arc, Avengers: No Surrender.

In December 2022, Marvel Comics released Monica Rambeau's first solo comic book series, Monica Rambeau: Photon.

== Fictional character biography ==
=== Origin ===
Monica Rambeau was born in New Orleans, Louisiana to Frank and Maria Rambeau. She was a lieutenant in the New Orleans harbor patrol. While trying to help a friend of her late grandfather in stopping a dangerous weapon, Rambeau was exposed to extra-dimensional energy and became capable of converting her body to energy. After this event, the media dubbed her "Captain Marvel." Following a close call where her excess energy nearly made her a danger to others before that power was drained off by Iron Man and Spider-Man, she decided to use her powers to fight crime under that name. She was told by Ben Grimm that the name had originally been used by the late Kree hero Mar-Vell, but Grimm assured her that "[Marvel] wouldn't mind. I probably ain't the only 'Thing' in the world either."

=== Joining the Avengers ===
Rambeau sought out the Avengers for help in mastering her new powers and became a member-in-training, soon aiding them against Egghead. Befriended and mentored by Avengers veterans Captain America and Wasp, Captain Marvel soon graduated to full membership after a battle against Plantman. She became their first African-American heroine.

Two of Rambeau's enemies are super-powered psychiatrist Moonstone (Karla Sofen), and Moonstone's powerful pawn Blackout (Marcus Daniels), who wields the Darkforce. Captain Marvel first encountered them when the Avengers opposed the duo's escape from incarceration in Project Pegasus. After that, Rambeau temporarily lost her ability to transform back to human form during a battle against Dr. Eric Paulson, in which she fought alongside Spider-Man and Starfox. She was with the team when the Beyonder abducted them and other Earth superheroes for the first Secret Wars saga.

Moonstone and Blackout returned as members of Helmut Zemo's Masters of Evil, participating in an occupation of Avengers Mansion and trapping Rambeau in the Darkforce Dimension. With help from Cloak, Rambeau was able to escape in time to help retake the Mansion. During the battle, Moonstone became temporarily paralyzed and Blackout dies. Another of Rambeau's major early foes was the murderous interstellar pirate Nebula, who shanghaied Rambeau into space for an extended period before she reunited with the Avengers.

=== Leader of the Avengers ===
Rambeau later replaced the Wasp as leader of the Avengers, commanding them in battles against the X-Men, the Olympian Gods, and the Super-Adaptoid. She spent a lot of time refereeing squabbles between Hercules and the Sub-Mariner, and dealing with the duplicitous telepath Dr. Druid, who sought to supplant her as Avengers chairman and undermined her authority at every opportunity.

When honorary Avengers member and wife of the Sub-Mariner Marrina transformed into the gigantic sea monster Leviathan, Captain Marvel led the hunt for the creature. During the battle that followed, Rambeau transformed herself into a massive bolt of lightning to try and stop the beast. She made contact with the water and accidentally conducted herself across the surface of the ocean, dispersing her atoms so widely that she barely regained physical form. She reformed as a frail, withered husk of a woman devoid of super-powers.

=== Regaining her powers ===
After retiring from the team, Rambeau regained first her physical health, and eventually her powers, initially developing the ability to manipulate mechanical energy for various effects. She resumed crimefighting, facing foes such as Brazilian crime lord Kristina Ramos, Moonstone, and Powderkeg. At the same time, she served as a cargo ship captain in her friend Ron Morgan's shipping company before starting her own charter business.

Rambeau stayed connected with the Avengers and served as a reservist, sometimes assuming leadership duties in the absence of the current chair. She helped repel an Atlantean invasion of the surface world and assists in the Acts of Vengeance, which involved a concentrated, multi-villain attack on Earth's superheroes, or in the Terminus Factor. Rambeau led a reserve substitute roster during the team's first United Nations-backed reorganization. She took on another leadership role during the Kree-Shi'ar war and led an Avengers delegation to the Shi'ar Empire to petition for peace.

When a group of aliens calling themselves Starblasters tried to push the moon away from Earth, Quasar assembled a team with some of the most powerful heroes of the world, recruiting Rambeau, Carol Danvers, Black Bolt, Hyperion, Ikaris, Darkstar, Vanguard and Perun. During this adventure, her original powers gradually regenerated, fully returning when the alien Stranger accelerates the process.

When Genis-Vell became an adventurer, he was known as Captain Marvel like his father before him—which Rambeau resented. After she, Starfox and Genis teamed up to defeat the Controller, Genis tried to concede the Captain Marvel title to Rambeau since he felt she was more worthy of it. Rambeau declined out of respect for the Mar-Vell legacy and adopted the new alias Photon.

=== Avengers Return ===
After the return of the main Avengers from the pocket universe created by Franklin Richards almost all the current and former Avengers members were trapped in a curse created by Morgan Le Fay, serving her as soldiers in a guard called Queen's Vengeance. Rambeau, under the name Daystar, is one of the first Avengers to recover their will and rebel against the sorceress.

For a time, Rambeau's mother intercepted her Avengers calls out of fear for her daughter's safety. After discovering this deception, Rambeau led an unofficial force of Avengers against the 'Infinites', who planned on relocating the galaxy.

Rambeau appears in JLA/Avengers, where she assists the Avengers in searching for the twelve items of power. After the battle for the last item in the Savage Land, Rambeau takes part in one annual JLA-Avengers meeting at the Justice League Satellite in the new merged world that the villain Krona created, being unaware of the changes. After that she appeared fighting along with other Captain Marvels of both universes (Mar-Vell and Shazam) in the final battle.

=== From Pulsar to Nextwave ===
When Genis-Vell wanted to establish a new identity for himself, he began calling himself Photon. Rambeau confronted him but decided to let Genis keep the Photon alias after she came up with a name she liked better, Pulsar.

Rambeau later led the Nextwave team, part of Highest Anti-Terrorism Effort (H.A.T.E.), against Unusual Weapons of Mass Destruction created by the Beyond Corporation where she avoided using a code name and wore a new uniform.

During the Superhero Civil War, Rambeau was a member of Captain America's Secret Avengers, but also registered as a member of the Initiative.

When Brother Voodoo asked for Rambeau's help in tracking down some evil sorcerers, she revealed a former relationship with Brother Voodoo to Black Cat, Hellcat, and Firestar. Despite her breaking it off, Voodoo still had feelings for Rambeau. She agreed to aid him, rekindling their relationship in the process.

Rambeau assisted Carol Danvers, in an investigation in the Gulf of Mexico, where Rambeau indicated that she was still fearful of using her powers under the water since her traumatic experience in battle against Marrina Smallwood, and aided Iron Man in the Avengers' deep-space monitoring station against ancient Viking monsters who claimed to be the Emperor of Mars.

=== Marvel Now! ===
During the Infinity storyline, Monica Rambeau took the name of Spectrum as she chased after the criminal Blue Streak. Even the police officers that arrested him were impressed by her latest alias and her new costume. Spectrum returned to a specialist shop in New York where a man named Luc sells designer superhero costumes. He mentioned that someone was waiting for her in the next room. Monica recognized the man, though apparently all he wanted to do was talk and ask for help. Spectrum heard the explosions when Proxima Midnight began her attack on the city. Her mysterious guest says he cannot be seen in America, and needed her help for a mysterious mission, but she was adamant that since he was in a costume shop and wanted her help, he had put on a costume and come help her.

Monica became field leader of Luke Cage's new Mighty Avengers team in the wake of the event.

During the Secret Wars storyline, Spectrum devised a plan to destroy Earth-1610 to keep it from colliding with Earth-616. In desperation during the two weeks before the end of the world, Spectrum channeled her full power and went to destroy Earth-1610. However, right before she could successfully destroy the other Earth, she spotted a group of children who lived there, causing her to hesitate for only a moment, long enough for the Maker to capture her.

In the aftermath of the "Devil's Reign" storyline, Spectrum assists the newly elected Mayor Luke Cage in taking down a Thunderbolts unit led by Crossbones. Afterwards, public relations specialist Helen Astrantia wanted Spectrum to lead the re-branded Thunderbolts. She turns down the suggestion and flies off.

== Powers and abilities ==
Monica Rambeau gained her superhuman abilities owing to bombardment by extra-dimensional energies. She can transform herself into any form of energy within the electromagnetic spectrum. Among the many energy forms she has assumed and is able to control are visible light, cosmic rays, gamma rays, X-rays, ultraviolet radiation, electricity, infrared radiation, microwaves, radio waves, and neutrinos. By assuming an energy-form, she gains all of that energy's properties.

She is invisible and intangible in many of her energy forms (the most frequent exception being visible light), and is capable of flight in all her energy forms (reaching velocities up to and including light speed). She also has the ability to project these energies from her body while she is in human form (only one wavelength of energy at a time), usually in the form of energy blasts from her hands. She mentally controls both the type and quantity of energy she wishes to transmit. The maximum amount of energy she can transmit at a given time is unknown. Rambeau can also divert small amounts of various energies for employment as force beams, which have the equivalent to 300 tons of TNT of explosive force. A variation of this ability enables her to project light-based holographic illusions of herself. Rambeau has also shown the ability to split her energy form into several miniature energy forms that are under her mental command, each miniature Rambeau is able to react and fly at light-speed.

When she encounters a new or unfamiliar energy, Rambeau can often duplicate it given enough time for analysis. Rambeau tends to be physically insubstantial in her energy forms, though with concentration and effort she can sometimes perform tasks such as briefly grasping an object, either by partially solidifying or by applying some sort of force to the object in question.

She is immortal and does not age beyond her prime.

When Rambeau temporarily lost her original powers after a massive energy expenditure, she developed the ability to shunt any mechanical energy directed towards her through a dimensional interface surrounding her body, granting her increased strength, resistance to impact, and the ability to fly. After Rambeau asked Reed Richards to examine these new abilities, he theorized that she accessed the same dimension from which she derived her energy powers to create the interface.

Rambeau has strong leadership skills and law enforcement experience due to both of her time as a police officer and former leader of the Avengers. She is a skilled markswoman, unarmed combatant, detective, and swimmer with extensive nautical expertise. She has received Harbor Patrol training, and Avengers training in unarmed combat by Captain America.

== Reception ==
Nick Hemming of Looper called Monica Rambeau a "spectacular heroine in her own right", writing, "Few understand just how monumental her contributions to the Marvel universe truly are, nor how massive her character potential remains, decades after her debut. As a character, her impressive energy-manipulating powers make her an Alpha-Level threat, while her strong leadership and sarcastic wit make her a fan-favorite This is the untold truth of Marvel's all-too-often forgotten Avenger, Monica Rambeau." Deirdre Kaye of Scary Mommy called Monica Rambeau a "role model" and a "truly heroic" female character. Chris McMullen of Space.com ranked Monica Rambeau first in their "5 Marvel Characters Who Deserve Their Own Show" list.Sideshow ranked Monica Rambeau 3rd in their "Top 10 Comic Book Captains" list, saying that Monica Rambeau is one of the characters "at the top of their game, taking charge of entire teams or striking out on their own with the skills and strength to earn their Captain title."

Keith Reid-Cleveland of The Daily Dot ranked Monica Rambeau 9th in their "12 Black Marvel Characters Everyone Should Know" list, stating, "There have been many Captain Marvels over the years, and they've all been highly capable at doing whatever they put their minds too. Monica Rambeau is no exception." Rob Bricken of Gizmodo ranked Monica Rambeau 10th in their "Every Member Of The Avengers, Ranked" list, saying, "She quickly proved herself among Earth's Mightiest Heroes." George Marston of Newsarama ranked Monica Rambeau 16th in their "Best Female Superheroes" list. The A.V. Club ranked Monica Rambeau 95th in their "100 Best Marvel Characters" list.

Screen Rant included Monica Rambeau in their "10 Best Marvel Characters Who Made Their Debut In Spider-Man Comics" list. Comic Book Resources ranked Monica Rambeau 4th in their "10 Best Marvel Legacy Heroes" list, 4th in their "All The Captain Marvels" list, 8th in their "Avengers' Greatest Leaders" list, and 10th in their "10 Most Wholesome Avengers" list.

== Literary reception ==
=== Volumes ===
==== Captain Marvel: Monica Rambeau (2019) ====
According to Diamond Comic Distributors, the Captain Marvel: Monica Rambeau trade paperback was the 112th best selling graphic novel in January 2019.

==== Monica Rambeau: Photon (2022) ====
According to the ComicHub system at local comic book shops selling American comics, Monica Rambeau: Photon #1 was the 53rd best selling comic book in December 2022.

Megan Loucks of Comic Book Resources called Monica Rambeau: Photon #1 a "perfect example of respecting the past and embracing the future," writing, "Overall, Monica Rambeau: Photon #1 is a great beginning of a new journey for the former Avenger that sets up something special for new and old fans of Monica. Ewing does an excellent job of respecting the character's past while making room for her to grow. With a creative team that hit it out of the park, this limited series is a relatable story of self-discovery. This limited series has something for everyone." Spencer Perry of ComicBook.com gave Monica Rambeau: Photon #1 a grade of 3.5 out of 5, saying, "Eve Ewing's new run on Monica Rambeau reminds readers, or perhaps confirms to new ones, why this character can be so compelling, even if there's more than the necessary amount of cameos. Ewing's work on the series is already character-driven with enough of a plot tease for what's to come that this first issue doesn't feel like a total exposition dump. Artists Luca Maresca and Ivan Fiorelli are credited with pencils which seem largely to fit the Marvel house style, nothing too exciting and largely similar in nature to every other regular book from the publisher. They do have a handful of moments with unique panel layouts however, including in the final page, which they should lean into more."

== Other versions ==
=== Age of Ultron ===
An alternate version of Monica Rambeau appears during the Age of Ultron storyline. She is amongst the superhero resistance against Ultron.

=== Earth-A ===
Like other inhabitants of this reality, Monica Rambeau would periodically visit Earth-616 for vacations. Due to the nature of the interdimensional travel, she received duplicate powers to her counterpart and would masquerade as her. It is implied that the inexperienced Rambeau appearing around that time in Black Panther was, in fact, this alternate. Rambeau claimed that the main reason she visited Earth-616 was not because she would gain superpowers but because her parents were still alive in that reality.

=== Forever Yesterday ===
An alternate version of Monica Rambeau appears in New Warriors #11–13 in an alternate reality that is known as Earth-9105. This version goes under the code-name of Sceptre. She is part of a murderous version of the Avengers, who enforce the will of Sphinx.

=== Marvel Zombies ===
An alternate version of Monica Rambeau appears in Marvel Zombies vs. The Army of Darkness #3. She is in her Nextwave uniform fighting alongside the rest of the team against a zombified Power Pack.

=== What If? ===
An alternate version of Monica Rambeau appears in "What if the Scarlet Witch Hadn't Acted Alone?", What If? Avengers Disassembled (2006).

== In other media ==
=== Marvel Cinematic Universe ===
Monica Rambeau appears in media set in the Marvel Cinematic Universe (MCU), portrayed by Akira Akbar as a child and Teyonah Parris as an adult. This version is the daughter of Maria Rambeau and friend of Carol Danvers, whom Monica affectionately refers as "Auntie Carol", who in turn refers to Monica as "Lieutenant Trouble". First appearing in the film Captain Marvel, Monica makes subsequent appearances in the Disney+ miniseries WandaVision and the film The Marvels. Additionally, an alternate timeline variant of Monica appears in the animated series What If...? episode "What If... the Hulk Fought the Mech Avengers?".

=== Video games ===
- Monica Rambeau / Spectrum appears as a playable character in Marvel: Future Fight.
- Monica Rambeau / Spectrum appears in Marvel Snap.

== Collected editions ==
Title	Material collected	Publication date	ISBN
Marvel Divas	Marvel Divas #1–4	January 2010	978-0785131779
Captain Marvel: Monica Rambeau	Amazing Spider-Man Annual #16, The Avengers (vol. 1) #227, 279, Marvel Team-Up (vol. 1) #142–143, Captain Marvel (1989) one-shot, Captain Marvel (1994) one-shot, Avengers Unplugged #5, material from Solo Avengers #2, Marvel Fanfare #42, 57	February 2019	978-1302917562
Monica Rambeau: Photon	Monica Rambeau: Photon #1-5	September 2023	978-1302947903
