= Goran Sudžuka =

Croatian comic book artist (born 1969)

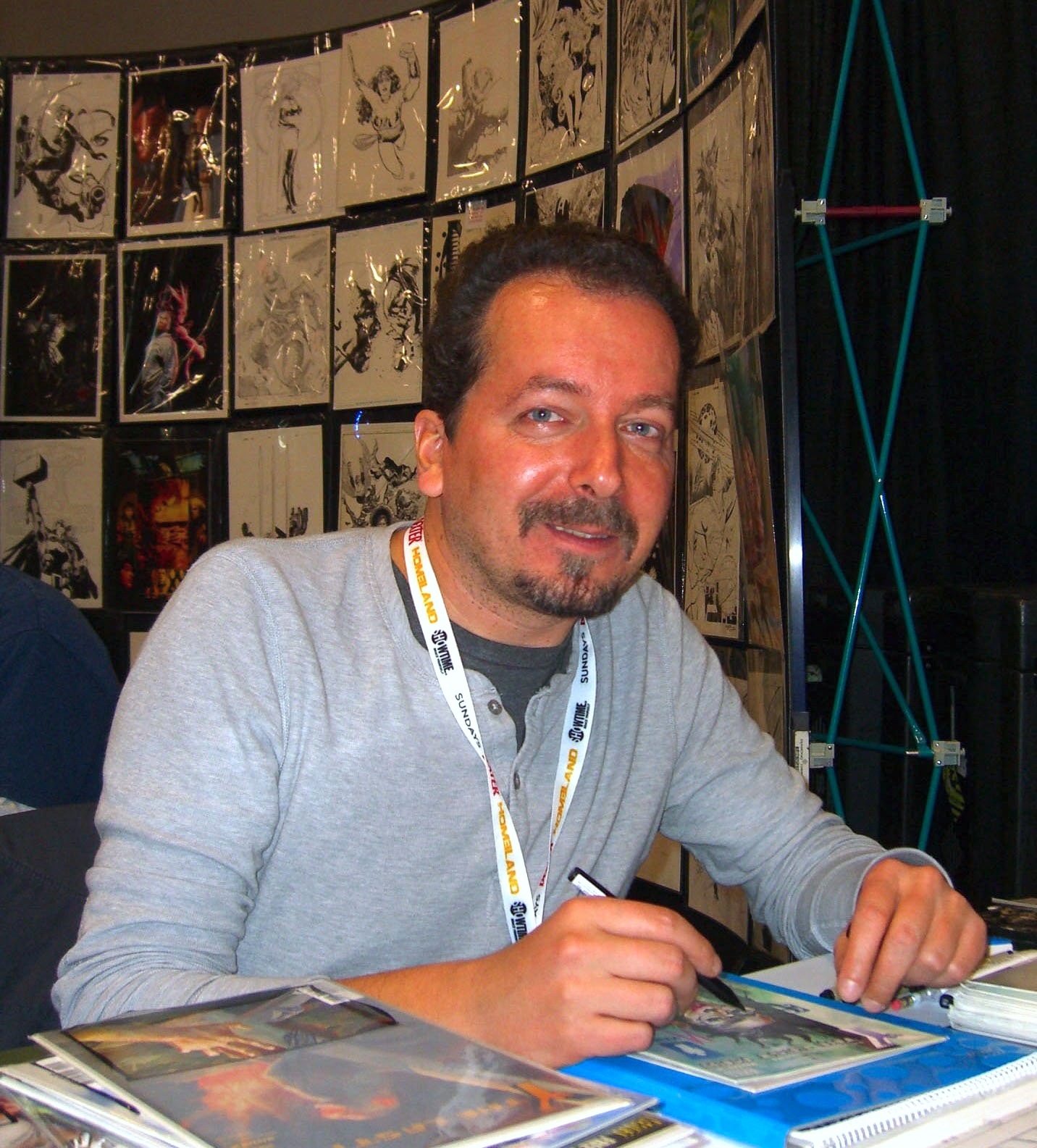
- Sudžuka at the New York Comic Con
- Area: Artist
- Notable works: Outlaw Nation; Y: The Last Man; Hellblazer: Lady Constantine; Wonder Woman; Ghosted
- Awards: 2001 Russ Manning Most Promising Newcomer Award

Goran Sudžuka (born 1969, Zagreb, Croatia) is a Croatian comic book artist, known for his work on books such as Y: The Last Man, Hellblazer: Lady Constantine and Ghosted.

== Early life ==
Goran Sudžuka was born in 1969 in Zagreb, Croatia, in former Yugoslavia. He graduated from the School of Applied Arts and Design, Zagreb in 1988.

== Career ==
Sudžuka began his work in animation at Zagreb Film. In 1990 he started collaborating with fellow Croatian Darko Macan on Albert the Butler, a series of short horror stories published in Croatia and Germany. Macan was the writer on most of the comics Sudžuka did in Croatia (some of those were later collected in a single volume called Sudžukice), including Svebor & Plamena, a teenage soap-opera which won him the award for Best Realistic Comic in Croatia in 1997.

In 1999 he began working for Vertigo, co-creating Outlaw Nation with writer Jamie Delano which won him the Russ Manning Best Newcomer Award at the Eisner Awards in 2001. In 2002 he illustrated the four-part series Hellblazer: Lady Constantine, written by Andy Diggle, and in 2005 he completed an album from the series L'Histoire Secrete for the French publisher Delcourt. From 2004 to 2007 Sudžuka was a regular fill-in artist on Brian K. Vaughan and Pia Guerra's Y: The Last Man. In 2007/08 he worked on another Hellblazer spin-off, Chas – The Knowledge written by Simon Oliver; in 2009 Sudžuka did two issues of the regular Hellblazer series written by Peter Milligan. In 2011 he completed A.D.D., a graphic novel for Vertigo written by Douglas Rushkoff and published in January 2012. Around the same time he also collaborated with writer Jason Aaron on issues 15 and 16 of Wolverine series. In 2013 he worked on the series Ghosted with Joshua Williamson for Skybound, and as fill-in artist on Brian Azzarello and Cliff Chiang's Wonder Woman.

== Personal life ==
Sudžuka currently lives in Zagreb, Croatia. Among his artistic influences Sudžuka cites fellow Croatians Andrija Maurović, Ivica Bednjanec, Igor Kordey, Darko Macan and Edvin Biuković, as well as many other international artists.

== Bibliography ==
Interior comic work includes:

- Outlaw Nation (with Jamie Delano, Vertigo):
  - Winter's Edge #3: "Minor Characters" (anthology, 2000)
  - Issues 1 to 8 (2000–2001)
  - Issues 9 to 19 (inks on Goran Parlov, 2001–2002)
- 9-11 Volume 2: "Child's Play" (with Jamie Delano, anthology graphic novel, DC Comics, 2002)
- Hellblazer (Vertigo):
  - Lady Constantine #1-4 (with Andy Diggle, 2003)
  - Chas – The Knowledge #1-5 (with Simon Oliver, 2008)
  - Hellblazer #254-255: "Regeneration" (with Peter Milligan, 2009)
- Q strip (anthology, Mentor):
  - "Luzeri" (script and art, in #4, 2004)
  - "Martina Mjesec" (with Darko Macan, in #8-10 and 12, 2005–2006)
- Beyond Avalon #1-2: "Wanderlust" (with Joe Pruett, Desperado Publishing, 2005)
- Y: The Last Man #32-35, 39-42, 46-48, 53-54 (with Brian K. Vaughan and Pia Guerra (#39 and 46), Vertigo, 2005–2007)
- Negative Burn vol. 2 #6: "Rick Cardet" (with Timohir Tikulin-Tice, anthology, Desperado Publishing, 2006)
- Hrvatski Velikani Volume 1 #1: "Tomislav, prvi hrvatski kralj" (with Darko Macan, Astoria, 2007)
- L'Histoire secrète Volume 3: "The Grail of Montségur" (with Jean-Pierre Pécau, Delcourt, 2007)
- Strange Adventures: "A TRUE STORY from Saucer Country" (with Paul Cornell, anthology one-shot, Vertigo, 2011)
- Wolverine vol. 4 #15-16: "Wolverine Forever, Wolverine No More" (with Jason Aaron, Marvel, 2011)
- A.D.D.: Adolescent Demo Division (with Douglas Rushkoff, graphic novel, Vertigo, 2012)
- Zabava za celu porodicu #25: "Pričati latinski" (with Vlada Tadić, co-feature, Lavirint, 2012)
- Vekovnici Volume 6 (with Marko Stojanović, among other artists, System Comics, 2013)
- Ghosted #1-5, 11-12, 20 (with Joshua Williamson and Vladimir Krstić (#20), Image, 2013–2014)
- Wonder Woman vol. 4 (DC Comics):
  - "The Queen of Roots" (with Brian Azzarello, Cliff Chiang and Tony Akins, in #18, 2013)
  - "Under Seas" (with Brian Azzarello and Tony Akins, in #19, 2013)
  - "Moon Over Mayhem" (with Brian Azzarello and Cliff Chiang, in #20, 2013)
  - "A Guilded Rage" (with Brian Azzarello, in #24-26, 2013–2014)
  - "Icy France" (with Brian Azzarello and Cliff Chiang, in #28, 2014)
  - "This Monster's Gone Eleven" (with Brian Azzarello, in #30-31, 2014)
  - "The Beast of Times" (with Brian Azzarello and Cliff Chiang, in #32, 2014)
  - "For the Love of a Queen" (with Meredith Finch, in Annual #1, 2015)
- Secret Origins vol. 3 #6: "The Secret Origin of Wonder Woman!" (with Brian Azzarello and Cliff Chiang, anthology, DC Comics, 2014)
- Green Lantern/New Gods: Godhead: "Chapter One" (with Van Jensen and Justin Jordan, among other artists, one-shot, DC Comics, 2014)
- Batman Eternal #42: "Black & Blue" (with Scott Snyder, James Tynion IV, Ray Fawkes, Tim Seeley and Kyle Higgins, among other artists, DC Comics, 2015)
- Empire of the Dead: Act Two #5 (with Rick Magyar — inks on Dalibor Talajić, written by George A. Romero, Marvel, 2015)
- Secret Wars: Master of Kung Fu #1-4 (inks on Dalibor Talajić, written by Haden Blackman, Marvel, 2015)
- Secret Wars: Thors #2-3 (with Jason Aaron and Chris Sprouse, Marvel, 2015)
- What if...? — Infinity #5: "Dark Reign" (with Joshua Williamson, Marvel, 2015)
- Batman and Robin Eternal (plot by Scott Snyder and James Tynion IV, DC Comics):
  - "Head Trip" (with Javier Piña, script by Ed Brisson, in #12, 2016)
  - "The Dying Joke" (with Andrea Mutti and Roger Robinson, script by Collin Kelly and Jackson Lanzing, in #16, 2016)
  - "Orphans" (with Javier Piña, script by Steve Orlando, in #25, 2016)
- Daredevil vol. 5 #4, 8-9, 15-16, 21-22 (with Charles Soule and Ron Garney (#4), Marvel, 2016–2017)
- Hercules vol. 4 #6: "Here's to a Long Life" (with Dan Abnett and Dalibor Talajić, Marvel, 2016)
- Howard the Duck vol. 6 #5: "Collect Call to Arms" (with Joe Rivera — inks on Joe Quinones, written by Chip Zdarsky, Marvel, 2016)
- Black Panther vol. 5 #11 (among other artists — inks on Chris Sprouse, written by Ta-Nehisi Coates, Marvel, 2017)
- Deadpool Kills the Marvel Universe Again #1-5 (inks on Dalibor Talajić, written by Cullen Bunn, Marvel, 2017)
- A Walk Through Hell #1-12 (with Garth Ennis, Aftershock, 2018–2019)

=== Covers only ===
- Teenage Mutant Ninja Turtles vol. 6 #62 (IDW Publishing, 2016)
- The Sovereigns #1 (Dynamite, 2017)
- Project Superpowers: Hero Killers #1 (Dynamite, 2017)
- Hack/Slash vs. Vampirella #1-5 (Dynamite, 2017–2018)
- Barbarella #4 (Dynamite, 2018)

== Awards ==
- 2001 Russ Manning Most Promising Newcomer Award

=== Nominations ===
- 2006 Eisner Award for Best Serialized Story, for Y: The Last Man #37-39: "Paper Dolls"
- 2013 Hugo Award for Best Graphic Story, for Strange Adventures: "A True Story from Saucer Country" (with Paul Cornell, Vertigo, 2011)
