= Terry LaBan =

American cartoonist (born 1961)

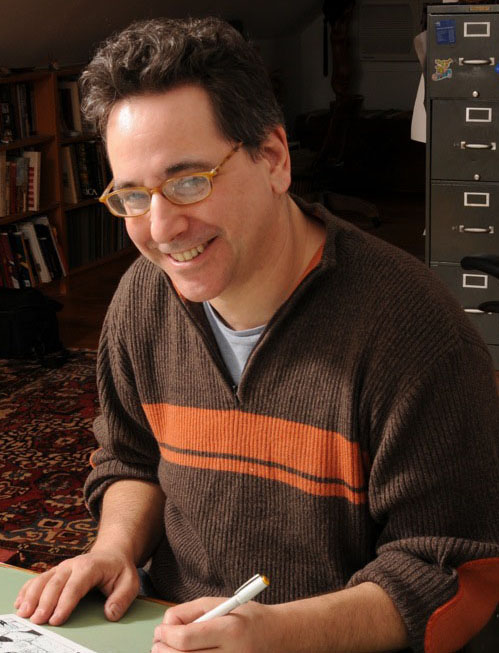
- Terry LaBan, photographed in 2007.
- Born: July 19, 1961 (age 65) Michigan, U.S.
- Areas: Cartoonist, Writer, Artist
- Notable works: Unsupervised Existence; Cud; Edge City

Terry LaBan (born July 19, 1961) is an alternative/underground cartoonist and newspaper comic strip artist. He is known for his comic book series Cud, and his syndicated strip Edge City, created with his wife, Patty LaBan, a couples and family therapist.

LaBan is known for his sympathetic and believable characters, real-life dialogue, tight cartooning style, and straightforward storytelling.

== Early life and education ==
LaBan grew up in the suburbs of Detroit, graduating from the University of Michigan.

== Career ==
=== Political cartoons ===
LaBan began his career in 1986, freelancing political cartoons for the Ann Arbor News. He's been staff illustrator and political cartoonist for the progressive political magazine In These Times since 1990.

=== Unsupervised Existence ===
The cover from Terry LaBan's International Bob, published by Fantagraphics Books.

LaBan's first foray into comics was his series Unsupervised Existence, published by Fantagraphics beginning in 1989. Loosely based on LaBan's own life at the time, Unsupervised Existence was a semi-humorous comic book soap opera that followed the adventures of Suzy and Danny, a young, bohemian couple living in Cleveland. Suzy, an underemployed intellectual, spends a lot of time hanging around with her friends and trying to figure out what to do with her life. Danny, her boyfriend, supports them both by driving a cab, but his true vocation is poetry, which he self-publishes, along with the work of his fellow cabbies. Unsupervised Existence garnered LaBan Harvey Award nominations for Best New Artist and Best New Series in 1990. The series was collected in its entirety in two paperbacks, Love's Not a Three-Dollar Fare (the main Suzy and Danny story) and International Bob.

International Bob focused on the series' most outrageous character, rock musician/performance artist Bob Binkum. In the book, hulking, morose Bob comes into his own after he leaves the United States in the wake of breaking up with his flighty girlfriend Annadette, who decided she was more into women than men. Fleeing the soap opera, Bob treks from Greece to India in search of exotic escape. LaBan vividly evoked the nothing-to-lose, anything-can-happen world of the unfettered, impecunious vagabond as Bob tries everything from selling junk jewelry on the street to getting ripped off after a romantic encounter.

=== Cud and Cud Comics ===
Unsupervised Existence was followed by another series, Cud (also published by Fantagraphics), in 1992. Patterned after books like Dan Clowes' Eightball and R. Crumb's Zap, Cud featured a continuing story called "You Can't Spank the Monkey If It's on Your Back", which followed the rise and fall of a performance artist named Bob Cudd. Cudd was lifted from Unsupervised Existence, but he was a different character in the new series. The rest of each issue featured random stories, several of which went on to appear in other places at other times. "Muktuk Wolfsbreath, Hard-Boiled Shaman", for instance, became a DC Comics miniseries. Cud lasted eight issues.

In 1995, LaBan moved over to Dark Horse Comics, where his third series Cud Comics ran another eight issues, until 1998. Though Cud Comics had almost the same name as the Fantagraphics series, it was otherwise very different. LaBan described it as "an attempt to create a sort of Generation X Freak Brothers". Every issue featured several stories about Eno and Plum, a "slacker" couple living in the city. Eno was a lazy Gen-X stereotype interested chiefly in watching cable television, while his girlfriend Plum was more of an active go-getter. Other major characters included Plum's dad, Seymour Riverpeace, a wealthy aging, pot-smoking hippy; Catherine, Plum's unhappily single girlfriend; and Edgar Reamington, a yuppie who was always trying to steal away Plum. Most of the stories in the first four issues were collected in a 1997 paperback. Laban cites both Archie Comics and Gilbert Shelton as influences for Eno and Plum.

=== Edge City ===
The cover from the Edge City collection, by Terry and Patty LaBan. Published by Andrews McMeel.

Starting in 2001, King Features Syndicate began syndicating Edge City, a daily comic strip drawn by LaBan and co-written with his wife, Patty LaBan. Edge City (e.g., a community outside the boundaries of what people traditionally think of as the city and its suburb) looks at modern family life through the eyes of the fictional Ardin family. In the strip, Len and Abby Ardin are a Jewish-American couple dwelling in the far reaches of suburbia, in a life very different from the one they lived growing up. Between managing their careers and taking care of their kids, Len and Abby barely have time to wave to each other as they hurry off to yet another meeting, carpool or errand. And while their neighborhood is incredibly diverse, it seems like everyone, no matter where they're originally from, lives pretty much the same way. An Edge City paperback collection was published in 2007. The strip ended syndication in 2015.

=== Other work ===
LaBan's comics, cartoons, and humorous illustrations have appeared in a vast number of magazines and anthologies over the years, including Blab, Mad, Nickelodeon Magazine and Details. He works as a freelance illustrator and writer for various comic book companies, most notably DC Comics and the European behemoth Egmont, which publishes books featuring Disney characters. Laban wrote Donald Duck comics for Egment for 14 years. He wrote the Grendel Tales miniseries "The Devil May Care," and a number of miniseries for Vertigo, including the opening story arc of The Dreaming.

Later Laban serialized an original full-length graphic novel about his character Muktuk Wolfsbreath, a "hard-boiled" Siberian shaman living in an unspecified past. Gods, spirits, and demons were the usual case load for this "Philip Marlowe of the Tundra." New episodes were posted twice a week at www.hardboiledshaman.com; LaBan self-published the complete graphic novel in Muktuk Wolfsbreath, Hard Boiled Shaman: The Spirit of Boo, in 2012.

Laban teaches graphic narrative at the Pennsylvania Academy of the Fine Arts. He is a dues-paying member of the National Cartoonists Society.

Laban has written on a middle-grade graphic novel for Holiday House called Mendel the Mess-up, which was published in December 2024.

== Personal life ==
Laban spent much of the 1990s in Chicago and now lives in Philadelphia with his wife and children.

== Selected bibliography ==
=== Creator comics series ===
- Unsupervised Existence (7 issues, Fantagraphics, June 1989–February 1992)
- 99 Girls (one-shot, Fantagraphics, 1991)
- Cud (8 issues, Fantagraphics, August 1992–December 1994)
- Cud Comics (8 issues, Dark Horse Comics, November 1995–September 1997)
- (w, with artist Peter Doherty) Grendel Tales: The Devil May Care (6 issues, Dark Horse, December 1995–May 1996)
  - collected in Grendel Tales: The Devil May Care. Dark Horse. Oct 2002. ISBN 978-1569717967.
- (w, with artist Peter Snejbjerg) The Dreaming (issues #1-3, DC Vertigo, June–Aug 1996)
- (w, with artist ILYA) Vertigo Vérité: The Unseen Hand (4 issues, DC Vertigo, September–December 1996)
- Eno & Plum (one-shot, Oni Press, 1998)
- (w, with artist Steve Parkhouse) Muktuk Wolfsbreath: Hard-Boiled Shaman (3 issues, DC, August–October 1998)
- (w, with artist Alex Horley) Battleaxes (4 issues, DC, May–August 2000)

=== Graphic novels and trade paperbacks ===
- International Bob. Fantagraphics. 1994. ISBN 978-1-56097-135-1.
- Love's Not a Three-Dollar Fare: More Stories from Unsupervised Existence. Fantagraphics. 1995. ISBN 978-1-56097-165-8.
- Eno and Plum: A Cud Comics Collection. Dark Horse. 1997. ISBN 978-1-56971-265-8.
- Edge City: A Comic Strip Collection by Terry and Patty LaBan. Andrews McMeel. 2007. ISBN 978-0-7407-6356-4.
- Muktuk Wolfsbreath, Hard Boiled Shaman: The Spirit of Boo. CreateSpace. 2012. ISBN 978-1475026511.
