= Marvel Divas =

Comic book

- Cover of issue 1 by J. Scott Campbell

Publication information
- Publisher: Marvel Comics
- Schedule: Monthly
- Format: Limited series
- Genre: Superhero
- Publication date: September – December 2009
- No. of issues: 4
- Main character(s): Firestar; Black Cat; Hellcat; Photon

Creative team
- Written by: Roberto Aguirre-Sacasa
- Artist: Tonci Zonjic
- Letterer: Cory Petit
- Colorist: June Chung
- Editor(s): Joe Quesada; Alejandro Arbona; Jennifer Grünwald; Warren Simons

Collected editions
- Marvel Divas: ISBN 0-7851-3177-9

Marvel Divas is a limited series comic book published by Marvel Comics. On April 9 2009, Marvel Editor-in-Chief Joe Quesada revealed in his weekly blog with MySpace Comic Books that the series follows four female heroes, who, up until now, had nothing in common. The group featured Firestar (Angelica Jones), Black Cat (Felicia Hardy), Hellcat (Patsy Walker) and Photon (Monica Rambeau), four single women who bond over their inabilities to find a solid romance. The creative team is Roberto Aguirre-Sacasa and Tonci Zonjic.

== Publication history ==
Originally, Aguirre-Sacasa had envisioned it as a solo book featuring the Invisible Woman. Further brainstorming had prompted him to pitch the miniseries as a Sex and the City homage for the Marvel Universe. He chose the four most unlikely characters and made them bond over their inabilities to find romance and the fact they were heroes. Aguirre-Sacasa describes the series as "a lot of hot fun". Most of the series would be viewed through the perspective of Hellcat.

== Plot ==
The series' four main story lines connect to a larger story.

Hellcat deals with her ex-husband, Daimon Hellstrom's attempts to reenter her life. Photon, also dealing with an ex, helps Brother Voodoo retrieve a powerful artifact. The Black Cat considers a return to the life of crime. Firestar, a graduate student studying art history, deals with her radiation powers giving her breast cancer. Justice appeared in the third issue of the miniseries.

== Criticism ==
The cover of the first issue and the likening of the plot to Sex and the City prompted critics to accuse Marvel and Aguirre-Sacasa of misogyny. Aguirre-Sacasa's response was "In terms of those specific accusations, it's something I'm pretty sensitive to, and I think my record holds that I've never written a misogynistic story, including 'Divas'".His response to the cover was "It's sexy, it's fun, it catches the eye, it gets people talking. [...] To me, the book stands and falls on its content, which is either your cup of tea or not, but I promise you it's not misogynistic."

== Collected editions ==
The series has been collected into a trade paperback:

- Marvel Divas (104 pages, Marvel Comics, January 2010, ISBN 0-7851-3177-9)
