= Mad Dog (Marvel Comics) =

- Mad Dog from a panel in Solo Avengers #9

Publication information
- Publisher: Marvel Comics
- First appearance: As Buzz Baxter: Miss America Comics #2 (Nov. 1944); As Mad Dog: The Defenders #125 (Nov. 1983)
- Created by: Stuart Little (writer); Ruth Atkinson (artist)

In-story information
- Alter ego: Robert "Buzz" Baxter
- Species: Human mutate
- Team affiliations: Roxxon Oil; Secret Empire; Mutant Force; United States Air Force
- Abilities: Enhanced senses and physical abilities Neurotoxic bite

Mad Dog (Robert "Buzz" Baxter) is a character appearing in American comic books published by Marvel Comics. Originally introduced in 1944 as a supporting character of Patsy Walker, Baxter became the dog-like supervillain Mad Dog in the 1983 series The Defenders.

== Publication history ==
Buzz Baxter's first appearance was in Miss America Comics #2 (1944), as the boyfriend of Patsy Walker. He continued to appear as a supporting character of Patsy until her comic was cancelled in 1965. He reappeared, alongside Patsy, in Amazing Adventures #13 (Jul. 1972) and made occasional appearances afterwards. He was revamped as the villain Mad Dog in The Defenders #125 (Nov. 1983).

Mad Dog was killed off in the Spider-Man storyline "Hunted", in which he was captured and hunted down alongside many other animal-themed characters.

== Fictional character biography ==
Robert "Buzz" Baxter was born in Centerville, California. He and Patsy Walker are high school sweethearts, and marry shortly after graduation. After high school, Baxter joins the USAF, serving in the Vietnam War and eventually acquiring the rank of colonel.

Baxter allows the company Roxxon to experiment on him and mutate him. As Mad Dog, he becomes a mercenary and a leading member of Mutant Force. The members of Mutant Force attack the wedding of Daimon Hellstrom and Patsy Walker, but are defeated and placed in S.H.I.E.L.D. custody. Mad Dog has also been an agent of the Secret Empire.

Mad Dog makes a minor appearance in the "Hunted" storyline, where he is among the animal-themed superhumans who are captured for Kraven the Hunter's Great Hunt. When the Great Hunt begins, Mad Dog is shot to death by one of Arcade's Hunter-Bots. Following his death, Mad Dog ends up in Hell, where he becomes a servant of Blackheart.

== Powers and abilities ==
Mad Dog gained superhuman powers as a result of bionic engineering and cellular augmentation by Roxxon and the third Secret Empire. He was given a dog-like appearance with pointed ears, claws, and fur on his limbs and torso. Mad Dog possesses superhuman strength, durability, and senses, particularly hearing and smell. He can generate a foaming chemical poison from his mouth that induces paralysis if it enters the bloodstream.
