= 5 Ronin =

Marvel comic book series from 2011

- Wolverine on the cover of 5 Ronin #1 (March 2011). Art by David Aja.

Publication information
- Publisher: Marvel Comics
- Schedule: Weekly
- Format: Limited series
- Genre: Superhero
- Publication date: March 1 – March 30, 2011
- No. of issues: 5
- Main character(s): Wolverine; Psylocke (O-Chiyo Braddock); The Punisher (Akagi); Hulk; Deadpool (Watari the Fool)

Creative team
- Written by: Peter Milligan
- Artist(s): Tomm Coker; Dalibor Talajic; Laurence Campbell; Goran Parlov; Leandro Fernandez
- Editor: Sebastian Girner

5 Ronin is a five issue comic book limited series published by Marvel Comics starring superheroes Wolverine, Hulk, the Punisher (Akagi), Psylocke (O-Chiyo Braddock), and Deadpool (Watari the Fool) reimagined as rōnin, masterless samurai set in 17th-century Japan. The series is written by Peter Milligan and features a rotating cast of artists. The series was published from March 2 to March 30, 2011.

Watari / Roninpool appears in the 2024 film Deadpool & Wolverine as a member of the Deadpool Corps.

== Publication history ==
Marvel Comics first announced 5 Ronin, by writer Peter Milligan and featuring artists Tomm Coker, Dalibor Talajic, Laurence Campbell, Goran Parlov, and Leandro Fernandez, in December 2010. Milligan stated that the idea of the series came from editor Sebastian Girner, expressing, "The egg of this idea was born in Sebastian's great interest and passion in all things Japanese... Sebastian and I made an omelet out of that egg." Milligan remarked that he is big fan of Akira Kurosawa's Seven Samurai and what drew him to the project was "that this era of Japan was in such a state of flux. One era was ending and a new one beginning. These times are difficult to live through; people are unsure where they stand, and this is a great arena for looking at character and seeing how characters act when taken to uncomfortable places."

Writer Peter Milligan on the series' setting:

In 1600, there was a famously bloody and pivotal battle at Sekigahara, where the Western and Eastern clans fought. This battle ended what became known as the era of the warring states. In other words, the world of Japan that we find is going through a some kind of cataclysmic, epochal change. It's a violent age, an age of deep anxiety. Though it's a very alien time and place, I feel that this era speaks to us about our own troubled times. We have our own cataclysmic changes going on, our own sense of anxiety and "uprooted-ness".

Milligan also explained that each of the five issues focuses on one character, but the stories are all inter-linked: "All these characters have to rediscover as the story continues that there's a reason they're all connected and drawn together. They each have problems that stem from the same source." As to why he chose the characters, Milligan remarked that they each represent an aspect of Japanese society. Wolverine made the most sense, and Psylocke is the character that fit in most beautifully. "Deadpool is perfect; he could have been originally designed for this story... Punisher also perfectly fits with what we wanted. Both of these characters manage to be archetypes and that's why they so neatly and usefully worked with this story. Hulk is a little different. Part of the fun there was writing against type or character expectation. Though, again, an integral part of Banner/Hulk's character perfectly matches what we wanted in this book."

== Premise ==
Bound together by the same fate, yet alone in their existence, Wolverine, Psylocke, the Punisher, Hulk, and Deadpool are forced to walk the lonely path of the masterless samurai in the violent and tumultuous world of feudal Japan.

== Story ==
=== Issue #1: Wolverine ===
An unknown Ronin, known as The Wolverine, traveled back home to his clan and suddenly was killed by one of his own fellow Ronin. Another identical Wolverine Ronin appears, and was confronted by the Fool (Deadpool), who claims that he buried him. Confused with the Fool's riddle, Wolverine goes forward to his temple, and was attacked by the unknown Ronin.

As the two fought, Wolverine knocked off the mask, and was shocked to discover it was his own brother, who went insane after being betrayed by the Daimyo's soldier. After decapitating the Ronin, Wolverine decides to set-off to find the Daimyo and avenge his brother.

=== Issue #2: Hulk ===
A spiritual monk, known as the Hulk, meditates in the mountain Hie, meditating to unleash his ability of a so-called Hulk. His meditations are often interrupted by a fool and villagers who are seeking his help. One of the villagers asked for his help to stop an army of bandits, who are attempting to destroy the village. The Monk agrees to help the village, and later faces off against the bandits who attempt to destroy the village.

Just as a large army of bandits approached, the monk turned into a Hulk, which slaughtered all the bandits. Despite the monk saving the village, he decided to go to the temple of Edo. The Monk left, but looked back at the village, then moved forward to continue his journey.

=== Issue #3: Punisher ===
A Ronin Warrior, who goes by the name Akagi, returns home from Korea after a long war, only to find his house is nowhere to be found. After learning from the villagers that his family was slaughtered by the Daimyo, Akagi plots revenge by attempting to kill the Daimyo by any means necessary.

After discovering from his housemaid, Namiko, that his wife committed seppuku because of her son's death, Akagi sets out to find Sato, one of the Daimyo's soldiers. Along the way, he was confronted by more soldiers and killed them by any means necessary. He found Sato in his house and killed him. After killing everyone of Sato's remaining soldiers, he left the house, but not before giving a coin to the Fool.

=== Issue #4: Psylocke ===
O-Chiyo Braddock, a British-Japanese Oiran, worked at a brothel on a daily basis. She earned the nickname Butterfly, due to her ability to read minds.

One day at the brothel, a strange Ronin (Wolverine) selected her for her services. The Ronin revealed that he planned to kill the Daimyo for murdering his master and all of the other Ronin. O-Chiyo and the Ronin fight until he pins her to the wall with a Sai, as O-Chiyo wants to be the one who kills the Daimyo. The Ronin questions her anger, saying that she should be angry with her father for killing himself and abandoning her, not with the Daimyo. Defeated, O-Chiyo eventually realizes that he is right.

=== Issue #5: Deadpool ===
The Daimyo's brother in arms, Watari fought by his side in the battle of Korea. After a large army gathered to eliminate the Daimyo, Watari was presumed killed, but his face was hideously scarred and he later became known as the Fool.

When the Daimyo was paid a visit by O-Chiyo in his house, he was puzzled by the O-Chiyo and Fool enigma, and found out that all of his men were killed. After Watari revealed himself to the Daimyo, he was shocked and horrified, resulting with the two fighting. Watari eventually killed the Daimyo, but forgets the reason for doing so.

He later met Wolverine outside of the Daimyo's temple, and told him that he killed the Daimyo himself. Wolverine was upset, stating that his preparation to fight the Daimyo was for nothing. The Ronin left disappointed, along with Akagi & The Monk, who learned that someone has finished their journey.

Together, the Ronin leave to seek another quest.

== Reception ==
The first issue of 5 Ronin was received with mixed reviews. Dan Iverson of IGN gave it a 6.5 (out of 10), praising the art by Tomm Corker and colorist Daniel Freedman, but calling the story "a bit too ambiguous and typical for the genre." David Pepose of Newsarama stated, "5 Ronin is a confusing, unexciting read that doesn't really do much to justify its 'Marvel superheroes as samurai' premise." Kelly Thompson of Comic Book Resources gave it 2.5 (out of 5) stars, declaring, "While there are definitely things to appreciate in this first issue of 5 Ronin, from evocative art to Milligan’s sometimes beautiful writing, in the end it feels a bit soulless. An emotional connection of some kind could have made something as blasé as revenge a bit more engaging." However, Matthew Meylikhov of Multiversity Comics gave the first and fifth issues 9.2 (out of 10), saying that, "Milligan crafted a fairly well organized tale of revenge featuring some of Marvel's biggest characters, and the various artists that have worked on each issue have made this title a must read for fans of both the characters and samurai in general."

== In other media ==
Watari / Roninpool appears in the 2024 film Deadpool & Wolverine as a member of the Deadpool Corps.
