= Firestar (Marvel Comics) =

- Cover to Firestar #4 (June 1986) by Barry Windsor-Smith

Publication information
- Publisher: Marvel Comics
- First appearance: Spider-Man and His Amazing Friends "The Triumph of the Green Goblin (September 12, 1981)"
- First comic appearance: Spider-Man and His Amazing Friends #1 (December 1981) (non-canon); Uncanny X-Men #193 (May 1985) (first canon appearance)
- Created by: John Romita Sr. Rick Hoberg; Dennis Marks

In-story information
- Alter ego: Angelica "Angel" Jones
- Species: Human mutant
- Team affiliations: Avengers; Hellions; New Warriors; Orchis; The 198; X-Men; Young Allies (Heroic Age); West Coast Avengers
- Abilities: Nuclear Fission Manipulation: Weak Force Radiation: Microwave energy generation and manipulation; Electromagnetic signature detection; Psionic disruption; Heat emission; Flight

Firestar (Angelica "Angel" Jones) is a superhero appearing in media including American comic books published by Marvel Comics. Created by John Romita Sr., Rick Hoberg, and Dennis Marks, the character first appeared in 1981 on the NBC animated television series Spider-Man and His Amazing Friends. Firestar has the ability to generate and manipulate microwave radiation, allowing her to fly and create intense heat and flames. In the comics, she has acted as a solo hero and also as a member of the Hellions, New Warriors, Avengers, and X-Men.

== Development and publication history ==
=== Spider-Man and His Amazing Friends ===
Fire-Star as she appeared in Spider-Man and His Amazing Friends

Firestar – spelled as Fire-Star – was created for the NBC animated series Spider-Man and His Amazing Friends, with Kathy Garver voicing. This version of the character has the ability to control heat in all its forms, as stated in the 1981 Spider-Man and His Amazing Friends one-shot comic.

The creators had wanted to use the Human Torch, but the rights to the character were tied up. Firestar's pre-production names included Heatwave, Starblaze, and Firefly. Dennis Marks, one of the original writers of Spider-Man and His Amazing Friends, stated in a 2002 interview that he had come up with the name of Fire-Star's alias, Angelica Jones, taken from one of his old girlfriends.

In the series, Fire-Star is identified as a former member of the X-Men, along with Iceman, with whom she occasionally appears to have a flirtatious relationship, and with whom she is sometimes seen on dates. At times, she dates Peter Parker (Spider-Man) as well, resulting in a relaxed love triangle of sorts.

Her origin is explained in "A Fire-Star is Born." Young Angelica Jones was subject to constant bullying by a schoolmate named Bonnie, who calls her "Miss Angelica Jinx" on account of mysterious events that occur in Angelica's presence, which unbeknownst to Bonnie and others around Angelica, are triggered by her newly emerging powers, of which Angelica is gradually becoming aware. As Angelica becomes fully aware that she is a mutant with superhuman abilities, she saves her father at one point during an accident while disguised.

Early in her senior year of high school, Bonnie and her boyfriend framed Angelica for the theft of a school trophy, causing Dean Wilmer to temporarily suspend Angelica from school. A strong need to correct this situation leads Angelica to become Fire-Star for the first time. She finds proof of Bonnie's deception, retrieved the missing trophy, and compels Bonnie to confess, which justifies her expulsion from school. She is later approached by Cyclops, Angel, and Iceman to join the X-Men. She accepted and was seen helping them against Magneto and the Sentinels.

The animated series and the one-shot Spider-Man and His Amazing Friends comic book (which adapted an episode for print) are not considered part of standard Marvel Universe continuity. However, the 2006 one-shot comic Spider-Man Family: Amazing Friends (August 2006) features an in-continuity story, "Opposites Attack!", in which the three superheroes work as a short-lived team. This story takes place shortly after the up-and-coming hero Firestar becomes a founding member of the New Warriors.

=== Firestar mini-series ===
Firestar's first in-continuity comic book appearance was in Uncanny X-Men #193 (May 1985). She next appeared in her own mini-series, which presented her definitive, in-continuity origin. The Firestar four issue mini-series depicts events both before and after Firestar's appearance in Uncanny X-Men #193, showing her development from a shy, insecure girl afraid of her developing powers to a confident young woman capable of easily defeating Emma Frost.

The mini-series also established that Firestar's powers were microwave-based, rather than the more common fire-generation power that her animated counterpart displayed. The comic-book Firestar essentially harnesses ambient microwave radiation from her environment; this makes her powers far stronger in an environment such as space, where the concentration of microwaves is much greater than within a planetary atmosphere.

=== Established character ===
After her initial miniseries, the character appeared in a five-part serialized story in issues #82–87 of the anthology series Marvel Comics Presents. She subsequently joined the New Warriors, as a regular character in Avengers, and the informal all-female team "Marvel Divas".

After the special Firestar one-shot issue (April 2010), Firestar returned to full-time superheroics as a character in the short-lived comic series Young Allies. Firestar appears as a main character in the I Am an Avenger comic book mini-series.

Firestar was one of the feature characters in the 2011 six-issue limited series Fear Itself: Youth in Revolt.

At the 2013 San Diego Comic-Con, Firestar was announced "to take her place as a major X-Men character for the first time" starring in the new comic book Amazing X-Men in November 2013.

Firestar played prominent role in the 2023 "Fall of X" storyline. At the storyline's inception, Firestar is announced as a full member of the main X-Men team for the first time following a reader vote. During the course of the story, she selflessly plays a double agent role in the villainous organization Orchis, allowing the world and her teammates to believe she has betrayed mutantkind, on instructions from Jean Grey.

== Fictional character biography ==
=== Hellions ===
A lonely girl raised by her widowed father Bartholomew and paternal grandmother, Angelica Jones discovered that she possessed mutant powers. After her grandmother's death by heart failure and her revelation that she was a mutant, her father sent Angelica to the Massachusetts Academy. The Hellfire Club's original White Queen Emma Frost began training Angelica in the use of her powers for the Hellfire Club's team of young mutants. She was never sent on field missions with the other Hellions, however, because of her lack of control over her lethal powers and because Frost wished to instill cruelty and callousness in Firestar's personality, and befriending other young mutants would work against that goal. Frost manipulated Angelica into perceiving her as a loving mother figure, unaware that Frost was secretly grooming her to be a potential assassin and bodyguard. Angelica did meet the New Mutants at a Massachusetts Academy dance and, with Frost's telepathic prompting, formed a crush on Cannonball.

Firestar was later emotionally manipulated by Empath, and accompanied the Hellions Thunderbird, Empath and Roulette on a mission against the X-Men, in which Thunderbird sought revenge on Xavier, thinking him responsible for his brother John's death. Angelica felt terrible guilt over the incident once she was free of Empath's power, however. Professor Xavier offered her a place at the Xavier School, but although she declined out of loyalty to the White Queen, she was touched and pleased by the offer.

While a student of the Massachusetts Academy, Angelica had Hellfire mercenary Randall Chase assigned to her as a bodyguard. Growing close to Angelica, Randall eventually began to suspect the White Queen's true motives and was to be terminated. He escaped, mortally wounded, and managed to warn Angelica of Frost's duplicity just before he died. In retaliation, Jones attacked and defeated the White Queen, and decimated the hidden training complex beneath Frost's Massachusetts Academy. Afterwards, she returned to living with her father (as she was still a minor at the time) but kept the unique costume and identity of Firestar given to her by Frost.

Firestar is one of the few surviving original Hellions after most members were murdered by Trevor Fitzroy. She, Warpath and Empath were the only members of the team not present during the massacre. Firestar and Warpath (accompanied by Warpath's X-Force teammate and Firestar's former love interest Cannonball), travelled to Nova Roma in Brazil to inform Empath and former New Mutant Magma of their teammates' deaths. The trio then went to the Massachusetts Academy where they removed the few remaining files on record of the Hellions' existence.

=== New Warriors ===
Shortly after her resignation from the Massachusetts Academy, Firestar became a founding member of the New Warriors when she was invited (or rather blackmailed) by Night Thrasher into joining, and helped them battle Terrax. She also aided Night Thrasher against Midnight's Fire. She also helped Thor defeat the Juggernaut alongside the New Warriors. The team battled the Mad Thinker and Primus, and then battled Psionex.

Firestar falls in love and became engaged to teammate Vance Astrovik (also known as Justice, formerly Marvel Boy). She later discovered that using her microwave powers could eventually render her infertile.

During a revenge scheme by a gang of thugs called the Poison Memories, Firestar's father was shot in the chest. He nearly died but recovered. Firestar also faced a time without Vance, as he had to serve a prison term for the involuntary death of his own father.

Firestar also provided vital assistance in helping Spider-Man tackle Carnage during "Maximum Carnage", when he was also forced to ally himself with Venom, Black Cat and Morbius to stop Carnage's reign of slaughter. Her microwave power proved the only weapon truly effective against Carnage following his 'upgrade'—his vulnerability to sonics having been weakened—but she still refused to kill Carnage, even to stop his murders. For a time, she was briefly attracted to Spider-Man's clone, Ben Reilly, when he joined the New Warriors under the identity of the Scarlet Spider, but their relationship never went beyond an interest due to Firestar's engagement to Justice and Reilly's secrecy causing him to avoid revealing his identity.

=== Avengers ===
Firestar and Justice eventually left the New Warriors together. Some time later, the two joined the Avengers after an alternate-universe adventure and a struggle against Morgan le Fay.

During this period, Hank Pym determined that the cause of her potential infertility was that her natural immunity to the effects of her own powers (which all mutants possess) had never fully developed. He designed a costume for her that would siphon off the excess radiation, give her natural immunity the opportunity to manifest fully and heal the damage already done. After a distinguished tenure with the Avengers, Firestar and Justice leave the group. She also made a tentative peace with Emma Frost during this time.

Angelica started college and enjoyed a "normal life", but she abandoned wedding preparations, leaving Vance with all of the responsibility. When Vance confronted her about this, she confessed that she needed more life experience before settling into married life. Vance left in anger and presumably ended their engagement.

=== Marvel Divas ===
In the limited series Marvel Divas (which was pitched as "Sex and the City in the Marvel Universe"), it is revealed Angelica's closest friends are Black Cat, Hellcat (Patsy Walker), and Photon. Firestar announces she has been diagnosed with cancer, apparently caused by the same inability to shield herself from her microwave emission powers that is making her infertile. Daimon Hellstrom approaches Patsy, his ex-wife, ensuring that Angelica would recover in exchange for Patsy remarrying Hellstrom and giving him her soul. Learning about Patsy's brave move to help in her recovery, Angelica and her supportive friends travelled to Hellstrom's dimension to rescue her, thereby rejecting his 'healing' help for Hellcat's freedom and taking her chances against the cancer. After returning to Earth, Angelica had a follow-up exam that revealed her cancer to be in remission.

=== One-shot and Young Allies ===
When the Bastards of Evil attack at the World Trade Center Ground Zero, she is the first of New York's heroes to respond. Shortly after, she is joined by Gravity, Nomad, Spider-Girl, and Toro. The group works to track down the Bastards of Evil, Firestar partnering with Gravity while the others pursued independent leads. In addition to tracking the Bastards, Firestar and Gravity begin to patrol the city at night fighting street level crime. During this period, Angelica is dismissive of Nomad and Spider-Girl, which she later regrets as it was not that long ago that she was an adolescent super hero.

When Nomad and Spider-Girl are captured by the Bastards of Evil, Angelica is able to use her microwave powers to track the Bastards and is able to drain the radiation that empowers them. With Gravity's help, she is able to expel the energy harmlessly into space. Nomad suggests that they remain together as the Young Allies, which everyone objects to, and they appear to go their separate ways.

In the final issue of Young Allies (issue #6), Emma Frost attempts to recruit Angelica to move to Utopia with the rest of the mutant population. No offer to join the X-Men was explicitly made, but as most of the mutants living in Utopia appear to be on call as needed, it can be assumed that if Firestar moved she would have been available to the team. Angelica refused the offer, eventually burning down Frost's hotel room to be left alone. Gravity and Firestar continue their evening patrols, and Frost suggests that Gravity has a romantic/sexual interest in her. He also appears to recognize her civilian identity when he sees her in a coffee shop, but she does not notice him.

The Young Allies are continuing to operate as a loosely affiliated team to fight Onslaught alongside the Secret Avengers in Onslaught Unleashed, despite the cancellation of their own series. Then Firestar appears at a meeting held by Prodigy regarding magical hammers that have crashed into the earth. She and Gravity agree to co-lead an Initiative team to help keep order during the crisis.

=== X-Men ===
Firestar joins the X-Men as a new teacher in the Jean Grey School assigned to teaching physics. After being dragged to Hell with other members of the X-Men, she was pulled into a quest to search for the deceased Nightcrawler. After returning to Earth, Firestar and Iceman encountered Spider-Man.

=== Orchis ===
After the establishment of the mutant colony on Krakoa, Firestar was slated to become a full-time member of the X-Men. Shortly after, however, Orchis attacked the island, killing several mutants, including Jean Grey. Before dying, Grey tells Firestar to join Orchis as a mole, leading the other X-Men to believe that she allowed Orchis access to Krakoa. Firestar is eventually exposed, but is rescued by Kitty Pryde, Emma Frost and Synch to participate in their final strike against Orchis.

=== West Coast Avengers ===
However, the trauma of having worked for a mutant-hating organization caused Firestar to sink into an alcohol-drowned depression. In this state, she was invited by James Rhodes to join the new West Coast Avengers which he and Tony Stark were putting together, which included several former supervillains like Ultron and Blue Bolt in their lineup.

== Powers and abilities ==
Firestar is a mutant whose body stores ambient radioactive/electromagnetic energy, which she can project and manipulate for various effects. As she alters the electromagnetic wavelengths, they form a microwave aura around her body, at which point she mentally "pushes" the microwaves away from herself. Doing this allows her to release heat, light, and radiation into her environment at various intensities. By focusing microwaves on a specific target, she can cause it to burst into flames, explode, or melt. She can project microwave energy blasts, which have a thermo-concussive effect, heating objects to the point of melting or incineration. The superheated and pressurized air created by the directed microwaves produces an impact. Firestar can also sense microwave signals (such as cellular phone signals or remote-control devices) and disrupt electronics with her own microwave emissions. By superheating the air around her, Firestar can generate enough upward thrust to fly at high speeds and lift objects as heavy as the X-Man Colossus. Firestar's mutant abilities do not grant her any particular immunity to the effects of intense heat other than that generated by her own microwave powers. During training exercises with Emma Frost in her limited series, she was chastised by her teacher for clumsiness and warned that she could have been "severely burned" by a laser. During a fight between the Avengers and Fantastic Four years later, the Human Torch was afraid of burning her with his own flames. However, she eventually displayed the ability to siphon heat energy and to detect electromagnetic signatures from broadcast transmissions.

Though exposure to high levels of microwave radiation can be harmful or fatal to living beings, Firestar is apparently immune to most of the damaging effects of her powers. Unlike most mutants, her immunity to her own power was not complete; she was in danger of rendering herself sterile until Hank Pym discovered a cure. He designed a suit of micro-circuitry to be worn under her costume that absorbed the excess microwave energy that was affecting her cells and diverted it in a way that would "kick start" her natural immunity to her own powers. Pym claimed it would take about six months for the process to be complete. Over time, Firestar appeared to be functionally immune to microwave radiation. She was later diagnosed with breast cancer, which was attributed to long-term exposure to her own power. Though the cancer is in remission, the current status of her immunity is unknown.

On rare occasion, Firestar has demonstrated the ability to disrupt the psionic powers of others using her own power (namely, Emma Frost, Empath, and the Darkling). She is not immune to psychic assault, but when using microwave abilities at a high level she is capable of disrupting it. Onslaught, and the Gamesmaster, were both able to use telepathy against her effectively.

The nature of Firestar's power is actually broader than first perceived, not only granting her the capacity for large-scale destruction but a wider range of capacities through nuclear fission interaction. In an alternative future timeline, it is discovered that her true power lies in conducting and channeling the electroweak force to better manipulate electromagnetic spectrum phenomena. Jones typically limits how much of her own power she accesses, fearing that she might permanently damage the planet, its atmosphere, and electromagnetic field. In space, she is far less inhibited and can access greater levels of ambient electromagnetic energy to fuel her powers.

== Reception ==
=== Critical reception ===
Deirdre Kaye of Scary Mommy called Firestar a "role model" and "truly heroic." Darren Franich of Entertainment Weekly ranked Firestar 34th in their "Let's rank every Avenger ever" list. CBR.com ranked Firestar 4th in their "10 Most Powerful Members of The New Warriors" list, 8th in their "20 Most Powerful Mutants From The '80s" list, and 15th in their "20 Most Powerful Female Members Of The Avengers" list.

In December 2022, Anthony Orland of Digital Trends called Firestar one of the "12 new Marvel characters we want to see in the Spider-Man 4 movie." Jordan Iacobucci of Screen Rant included Firestar in their "10 Marvel Superheroes From The ‘80s Who Should Join The MCU" list, while Lukas Shayo named her one of the "10 Iconic New York City-Based Marvel Superheroes We Haven't Seen In The MCU" list.

=== Impact ===
In July 2022, Marvel Comics announced that Firestar was the winner of the second annual X-Men fan vote.

== Other versions ==
=== Spider-Verse ===
An alternate universe version of Firestar makes a minor appearance in Edge of Spider-Verse: Web of Fear, where she is killed in battle. This universe is an alternate version of Spider-Man and his Amazing Friends (Earth-1983).

=== Exiles ===
An alternate version of Firestar was forced to join the team known as Weapon X, a group of alternate reality-hopping super-people bound to repair broken worlds. Firestar is killed in a mega-blast unleashed by her own powers, opposing the evil Hyperion.

=== Marvel Zombies vs. Army of Darkness ===
An alternate universe version of Firestar appears in Marvel Zombies vs. The Army of Darkness.

=== MC2 ===
Firestar appeared in a flashback detailing the last adventure of the original Avengers. Firestar was among the team members who died in the team's final battle.

=== Mutant X ===
In the Mutant X Universe, Firestar's powers had evolved to the point where her entire body was composed of microwave energy. She was one of the many people trying to resist the rule of Madelyne Pryor. She, along with numerous other heroes, died in battle in the final issue of Mutant X.

=== Spider-Man Loves Mary-Jane ===
Firestar appeared in Spider-Man Loves Mary Jane. In the initial Firestar story, Mary Jane watched Spider-Man and Firestar battling crime together and became very jealous. In subsequent issues, Firestar expressed a true romantic interest in Spider-Man. The Firestar story arc took place in issues #16-20 of the series and was compiled in digest format as Spider-Man Loves Mary Jane, Vol. 4. Also, Iceman appears in a few pages of the final issue of the story arc, showcasing a rare comic-book moment in which the "Spider-Friends" are shown together.

=== Ultimate Marvel ===
Brian Michael Bendis, writer of Ultimate Spider-Man, revealed his intentions to have the Ultimate Marvel version of Firestar appear in the book in an interview on Comic Book Resources on July 20, 2007. Bendis further stated he had spent 120 issues working toward this and making it an "organic" event and not something "I pulled out of my ass". This version of Firestar is Liz Allan, who is revealed to be a mutant with fire-based abilities.

=== Sins of Sinister ===
In a potential future, Firestar's DNA is used in the creation of mutant chimeras.

== In other media ==
=== Television ===
- Firestar appears in Wolverine and the X-Men, voiced by Tara Strong. This version originates from a Sentinel-dominated future.
- Firestar appears in The Super Hero Squad Show, voiced by Laura Bailey. This version is a high school student.

=== Video games ===
- Firestar appears as an assist character in Spider-Man and Venom: Maximum Carnage.
- Firestar appears in Marvel: Ultimate Alliance 2, voiced by Kimberly Brooks. This version is an ally of Captain America in opposing the Superhuman Registration Act and appears as a mini-boss in the pro-registration campaign and as a boss in the anti-registration campaign.
- Firestar appears as a playable character in Marvel Super Hero Squad Online, voiced again by Tara Strong.
- Firestar appears as a team-up character in Marvel Heroes.

=== Miscellaneous ===
In 1987, Firestar appeared as a guest in Marvel Comics' live reenactment of Spider-Man's wedding to Mary Jane Watson.

=== Merchandise ===
Firestar has been merchandised in various forms. In 1994, a Firestar Real Heros cup was available at Pizza Hut. Wizard Entertainment introduced a Firestar action figure offered in Toyfare Magazine #2 in 1997. Wizkids marketed Firestar HeroClix figurines (set of 4) in November 2004. Art Asylum produced a Firestar Minimate action figure in 2005. In December 2007, Diamond Select released a 6-inch Firestar minibust. Firestar is featured on cards in the Marvel Universe Trading Cards Series 1 (1990, card #85), Series 2 (1991, cards #32 and 156), Series 3 (1992, card #174), Series 4 (1993, card #20), and Series 5 (1994, cards #20 and 73). Firestar was also included in a number of T-shirts, posters, and art prints featuring New Warriors. In February 2021 Hasbro released a 6” Marvel Legends action figure of Firestar.

== Collected editions ==
Title	Material collected	Published date	ISBN
Firestar	Firestar #1–4	1986	
Marvel Divas	Marvel Divas #1–4	January 2010	978-0785131779
