= Edge City =

American comic strip by Terry and Patty LaBan

- The cover from the Edge City collection, by Terry and Patty LaBan. Published by Andrews McMeel.
- Author: Terry and Patty LaBan
- Illustrator: Terry LaBan
- Website: comicskingdom.com/edge-city
- Current status/schedule: Ended
- Launch date: 2000
- End date: January 2, 2016
- Syndicate(s): King Features Syndicate
- Publisher: Andrews McMeel Publishing
- Genre: Humor

Edge City is an American syndicated comic strip created by the husband-and-wife team of Terry and Patty LaBan. The couple teams to write the strips with Terry handling the art. Distributed by King Features Syndicate, the strip debuted in 2000 and ended on January 2, 2016.

== Characters and story ==
The main characters in Edge City are the members of the Ardin family. The Ardins are Jewish, and the strip generally features the characters celebrating Passover and Hanukkah at those times of year. Len Ardin is the co-owner of a courier service, and Abby is a therapist. Their children, Colin and Carly, are both elementary school students. Edge City (e.g., a community outside the boundaries of what people traditionally think of as the city and its suburb) looks at modern family life. Dwelling in the far reaches of suburbia, Len and Abby lead a life very different from the one they lived growing up. Between managing their careers and taking care of their kids, they barely have time to wave to each other as they hurry off to yet another meeting, carpool or errand. And while their neighborhood is incredibly diverse, it seems like everyone, no matter where they're originally from, lives pretty much the same way. Terry LaBan offered this description of the strip:

Edge City is a daily comic strip internationally syndicated by King Features, that satirizes modern family life through the eyes of a post-Baby Boomer, Jewish-American family. It concentrates on the relationship between Abby, a therapist in private practice, and Len, an aging urban hipster who co-owns a delivery service and plays in a weekend rock band, as they juggle the pressures of running their careers and dealing with their two kids, Colin, ten, and Carly, eight. There are also a number of peripheral characters, like Rajiv, Len's Indian-American partner, and Abby's parents. The strip generally takes the form of simple stories that last about two weeks and explore some kind of issue or incident, like Abby having insomnia or Len joining a Led Zeppelin cover band.

== Books ==
The strip has been compiled in Edge City: A Comic Strip Collection by Terry and Patty LaBan. Andrews McMeel. 2007. ISBN 978-0-7407-6356-4.

== See also ==
- Abie the Agent
