= Goran Parlov =

Croatian comic book artist

- Born: March 24, 1967 (age 59) Pula, Croatia
- Areas: Penciller, Inker
- Notable works: Punisher MAX

Goran Parlov (born March 24, 1967) is a Croatian comic book artist.

== Early life ==
Goran Parlov graduated from the Academy of Fine Arts in Zagreb in 1991 and soon moved to Italy.

== Career ==
Parlov began drawing comics professionally in the early 90s, after moving to Italy. His first published work was in the Ken Parker Magazine, where he drew an episode of the regular series and a short story, written by Giancarlo Berardi. In 1993 Parlov joined Bonelli, where he started out illustrating the Nick Raider series, and later moved on to the Magico Vento. In the early 2000s he began working for the American market, first at Vertigo, where he finished Jamie Delano's Outlaw Nation series for Goran Sudžuka. He subsequently did a fill-in arc at Y: The Last Man, and later did work for Marvel.

== Personal life ==
After living and working in Milan for almost a decade, Parlov moved back to Zagreb.

== Bibliography ==
Interior comic work includes:

- 2084 (with Slobodan Ivkov, Moria, 1991)
- Ken Parker Magazine (with Giancarlo Berardi, Parker):
  - "Ore d'angoscia" (with Pasquale Frisenda, in #3-5, 1992)
  - "Burocrazia" (in #9, 1993)
- Nick Raider (Bonelli):
  - "Sangue sotto la neve" (with Claudio Nizzi, in #64, 1993)
  - "Passo falso" (with Alberto Ongaro, in #73, 1994)
  - "La mela marcia" (with Gino D'Antonio, in #82, 1995)
  - "Gli occhi del gatto" (with Gino D'Antonio, in #88, 1995)
  - "Voci di notte" (with Gino D'Antonio, in #97, 1996)
- Tex Albo speciale #11: "L'ultima frontiera" (with Claudio Nizzi, Bonelli, 1997)
- Magico Vento #11, 16, 22 (with Giancarlo Berardi, Bonelli, 1998–1999)
- Outlaw Nation #9–19 (with Jamie Delano, Vertigo, 2001–2002)
- Terminator 3 #1–2: "Before the Rise" (with Ivan Brandon, Beckett Comics, 2003)
- Y: The Last Man #21–23: "Widow's Pass" (with Brian K. Vaughan, Vertigo, 2004)
- Black Widow vol. 3 #2–6 (with Richard K. Morgan, Marvel Knights, 2004–2005)
  - Parlov provided the layouts, Bill Sienkiewicz penciled and inked the issues.
- The Punisher vol. 7 (Marvel MAX):
  - "Barracuda" (with Garth Ennis, in #31–36, 2006)
  - "Long Cold Dark" (with Garth Ennis, in #51–54, 2007–2008)
  - "Valley Forge, Valley Forge" (with Garth Ennis, in #55–60, 2008)
  - "Welcome to the Bayou" (with Victor Gischler, in #71–74, 2009)
  - "Father's Day" (with Peter Milligan, co-feature, in #75, 2009)
- Punisher MAX Presents: Barracuda #1–5 (with Garth Ennis, Marvel MAX, 2007)
- Volto Nascosto #1: "I predoni del deserto" (with Giancarlo Berardi, Bonelli, 2007)
- Marvel Universe vs. The Punisher #1–4 (with Jonathan Maberry, Marvel, 2010)
- 5 Ronin #4: "The Way of the Butterfly" (with Peter Milligan, Marvel, 2011)
- Tomb of Dracula Presents: Throne of Blood (with Victor Gischler, one-shot, Marvel, 2011)
- Fury MAX #1-13: "My War Gone by" (with Garth Ennis, Marvel MAX, 2012–2013)
- A+X #16: "Spider-Man + Psylocke" (with Sean Ryan, anthology, Marvel, 2014)
- Starlight (with Mark Millar, Image, 2014)
- The Spectacular Spider-Man (with Chip Zdarsky, Marvel):
  - "Spider-Fight" (co-feature in vol. 3 #1, 2017)
  - "The Canary" (co-feature in vol. 1 #300, 2018)
- Punisher MAX: The Platoon (with Garth Ennis, Marvel, 2017)
- Hit-Girl Season Two #5–8: "Hong Kong" (with Daniel Way, Image, 2019)
- Marvel Comics #1000: "Bloodbath" (with Jason Aaron, anthology, Marvel, 2019)

=== Covers only ===
- Marvel Universe vs. Wolverine #4 (Marvel, 2011)
- Jupiter's Circle vol. 1 #1 (Image, 2015)
- Mythic #4 (Image, 2015)
- Drifter #10 (Image, 2016)
- Web of Venom: Ve'Nam #1 (Marvel, 2018)
- Spider-Gwen: Ghost-Spider #4 (Marvel, 2018)
- Kingsman: The Red Diamond #6 (Image, 2018)
