= 12 Peers Theater =

Theatre based in Pittsburgh, PA

12 Peers Theater is a professional theatre company based in Pittsburgh, Pennsylvania. Established in 2011 by Vince Ventura and Sara Fisher, the company has held productions in the Grey Box Theatre in Lawrenceville and Modern Formations Gallery in Garfield. 12 Peers has produced the musical tick, tick...BOOM! by Jonathan Larson as well as Pittsburgh premieres of contemporary plays such as The Weird by Roberto Aguirre-Sacasa, Talk About the Passion by Graham Farrow, and sustenance by James Roday. In addition to full productions, the company has produced the Cultivating Culture Series, a series of new play workshops and cabarets, as well as the Pittsburgh Monologue Project, a series of monologues by Robert Isenberg and Brad Keller inspired by real-life interactions that is also regularly performed by the Duquesne University Red Masquers. 12 Peers has received attention from the publications Pittsburgh City Paper and Pittsburgh Magazine.

== See also ==
- Theatre in Pittsburgh
