= Outlaw Nation =

- Cover of the first issue, art by Glenn Fabry.

Publication information
- Publisher: Vertigo Comics
- Schedule: Monthly
- Format: Ongoing series
- Publication date: November 2000 – May 2002
- No. of issues: 19
- Main character(s): Story Johnson

Creative team
- Created by: Jamie Delano; Goran Sudzuka
- Written by: Jamie Delano
- Penciller(s): Goran Sudzuka (1–8); Goran Parlov (9–19)
- Inker(s): Goran Sudzuka (1–3, 9–19); Sebastian Camagajevac (4–8)
- Letterer(s): Robert Solanovic
- Colorist(s): Noelle Giddings; Allen Jamison; Zylonol Studios
- Editor(s): Karen Berger; Will Dennis; Steve Bunche

Collected editions
- Outlaw Nation: ISBN 1-58240-707-X

Outlaw Nation is an American comic book series originally published by Vertigo Comics from 2000 to 2002. The nineteen issues series was created by Jamie Delano and Goran Sudzuka, about a family with extremely long lifespans.

In an interview about the comic Delano stated that it was "my shot at a big, sprawling 'American Adventure Story' played on that classic widescreen theater of extremes, the territory of the imagination represented to me, a non-native outsider, by the North American continent and its culture. It is a fast-paced, hard-boiled, black-comic, stoned political thriller; a weird Western; an epic family saga touring the underground mythology of America: it is a 'road-movie' of personal discovery for Story Johnson as he returns home to see if the 'American Spirit' of his bizarre family has maintained in its resistance to the oppression of the 'American Dream'".

Suzuka was awarded the Russ Manning Most Promising Newcomer Award at the 2001 Eisner Awards, for his work on Outlaw Nation.

== Plot ==
The main character, Story Johnson, is the black sheep of the Johnson family, a semi-immortal, illuminati-clan, that in effect controls America from behind the scenes. Johnson, a 100-year-old, semi-deranged, amnesiac, pulp fiction-writer returns home after spending twenty-five years missing in action in Vietnam, to reconcile with his past and build a new future, but his eccentric family have other plans for him.

== Reception ==
In a review of the comic, Crisis On Infinite Midlives' Amanda states that "Delano uses the saga to make points about society's (American, in particular) darker points: corporate greed, government corruption, fascination with quick fixes instead of hard work, Jerry Springer style TV programs. Whether or not you agree with the points he makes, it's a compelling Alice-down-the-rabbit-hole kind of read".

== Collected editions ==
The series was collected by Desperado Studios and Image Comics into a single black & white trade paperback containing 456 pages, which was released on November 8, 2006 (ISBN 158240707X).
