= Darko Macan =

Croatian writer and illustrator (born 1966)

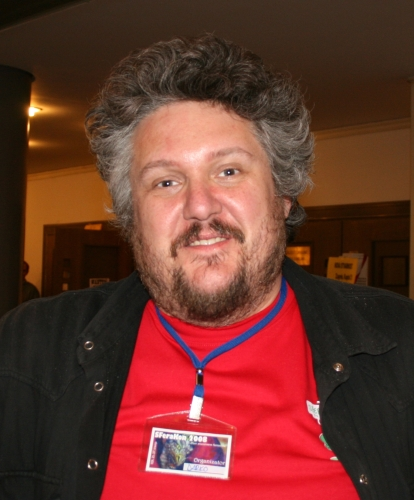
- Born: 1966 (age 59–60) Zagreb, Croatia
- Areas: Writer, artist
- Pseudonym: Cecile Quintal

Darko Macan (born 1966) is a Croatian writer and illustrator who has created and collaborated on comics, essays and science fiction and fantasy. He is also an editor.

== Biography ==
Born in Zagreb, where he still lives, he has a degree in history and archeology from the University of Zagreb.

He has drawn and written many comic books, mostly in Croatian, but in 1993 he broke into the American comics industry when he and fellow Croatian artist Edvin Biuković submitted their work to Dark Horse Comics. He has also done Donald Duck and Mickey Mouse for Disney comics. He was nominated for the Eisner Award twice (Grendel Tales: Devils and Deaths and Prayer to Sun).

As a writer, he has sold more than forty science fiction and fantasy short stories, two science fiction novels and three children's books. He has won four SFERA Awards and two Grigor Vitez Awards.

Under the pseudonym Cecile Quintal he has written essays about comics.

He was editor of nine Annual Collections of Croatian SF. He is editor-in-chief of the Q strip comics magazine.

== Bibliography ==
A cover of the Q strip comics magazine.

=== Science fiction and fantasy prose ===
- Ona koju vole bogovi, novel (with Tatjana Jambrišak, Goran Konvični, Damir Starešinić and Berislav Lopac) (included in annual collection Zagreb 2014 by SFera, 1998)
- Koža boje masline, novel (included in annual collection Dvije tisuće šarenih aliena by SFera, 2000), SFERA Award
- Teksas Kid (i još neka moja braća), short story collection, includes Koža boje masline (Mentor, 2003)
- 42 (pročitaj i daj dalje), short stories (Mentor, 2009)

=== Books about science fiction ===
- Macan čita! (obdukcija SF-žanra u Hrvata) (Mentor, 2007)

=== Books for children ===
- Knjige lažu! (Znanje, 1997), Grigor Vitez Award
- Pavo protiv Pave (Mozaik kniga, 2002)
- Žuta minuta: rock'n'roll bajka (Autorska kuća, 2005), Grigor Vitez Award
- Dlakovuk (Knjiga u centru and Autorska kuća, 2007)
- Jadnorog (Knjiga u centru, 2008)

=== Comics ===
- Citati (with Edvin Biuković, Stripagent, 1993, 2000)
- Strossmayer (with Radovan Devlić and Dušan Gačić, Glas koncila, 1993)
- Grendel Tales: Devils and Deaths (with Edvin Biuković, Dark Horse Comics, 1996)
- Star Wars: X-Wing: The Phantom Affair (with Michael Stackpole and Edvin Biuković, Dark Horse Comics, 1997)
- Borovnica (Školska knjiga, 1998)
- Tarzan: Carson of Venus (with Igor Kordej, Dark Horse Comics, 1999)
- Hellblazer #144-145 (with Gary Erskine, Vertigo, 2000)
- Star Wars: Vader's Quest (with Dave Gibbons, Dark Horse Comics, 2000)
- Weird War Tales (with Edvin Biuković, "A Prayer to the Sun", Vertigo, 2000)
- Star Wars Tales 3: Lady Luck (with Rich Handley, Dark Horse Comics, 2001)
- Star Wars: Chewbacca (with a group of other artists, Dark Horse Comics, 2001)
- Komarac: Prop'o plan (with Štef Bartolić; Profil, 2001)
- Star Wars: Jedi vs Sith (with Ramon Bachs, Dark Horse Comics, 2002)
- La Bête Noire #1-5 (with Milan Jovanović, Drugi pogled, 2001 and 2002)
- Mister Mačak (with Robert Solanović and Tihomir Tikulin; Bookglobe, 2002)
- Cable: The End (with Igor Kordej, David Tischmann and Mike Huddlestone, Marvel Comics, 2002)
- Soldier X #1-8 (with Igor Kordej, Marvel Comics, 2002)
- Mr. Meow (with Robert Solanović) in Furrlough issue #113, Radio Comix, 2002
- La mort dans les yeux (with Danijel Žeželj, Mosquito, 2004)
- Mister Mačak protiv zvjezdanog roja (with Robert Solanović; Bookglobe, 2005)
- Borovnica - - - protiv Paje Pauka! (Mentor, 2005)
- Borovnica - - - predvodi čopor! (Mentor, 2007)
- Borovnica: pasice (Mentor, 2007)
- Pirati - cio svijet na internet! (Autorska kuća, 2007)
- Kolumbo (Mentor, 2007)
- Martina Mjesec (with Goran Sudžuka; Mentor, 2007)
- Svebor i Plamena (with Goran Sudžuka and Matija Pisačić; Fibra, 2007)
- Mali Guj i njegov Zmuj (with Frano Petruša; Mentor, 2007)
- Borovnica - - - rani dani! (Mentor, 2008)
- Mišo: štakori trče počasni krug! (Mentor, 2008)
- Bočko: 20 godina s nama (Mentor, 2008)
- Sergej: stare priče (Mentor, 2008)
- Dnevniq (Mentor, 2009)
- Nous, les morts 1-4 (with Igor Kordej, Delcourt, 2015)
- Marshal Bass 1-8 (with Igor Kordej, Delcourt, 2017)

=== Books about comics ===
- Stripocentrik : (Kvintalove tjedne kartice) (Mentor, 2005)
- Hrvatski strip : 1945.-54. (Mentor, 2007)

=== Video games ===
- Starpoint Gemini 3 (LGM, 2019)

== See also ==
- Science fiction in Croatia

Preceded by Dan Jurgens	Captain America writer 2002	Succeeded by John Ney Rieber
Preceded by Warren Ellis	Hellblazer writer 2000	Succeeded by Brian Azzarello
