= Roberto Aguirre-Sacasa =

American writer (born 1973)

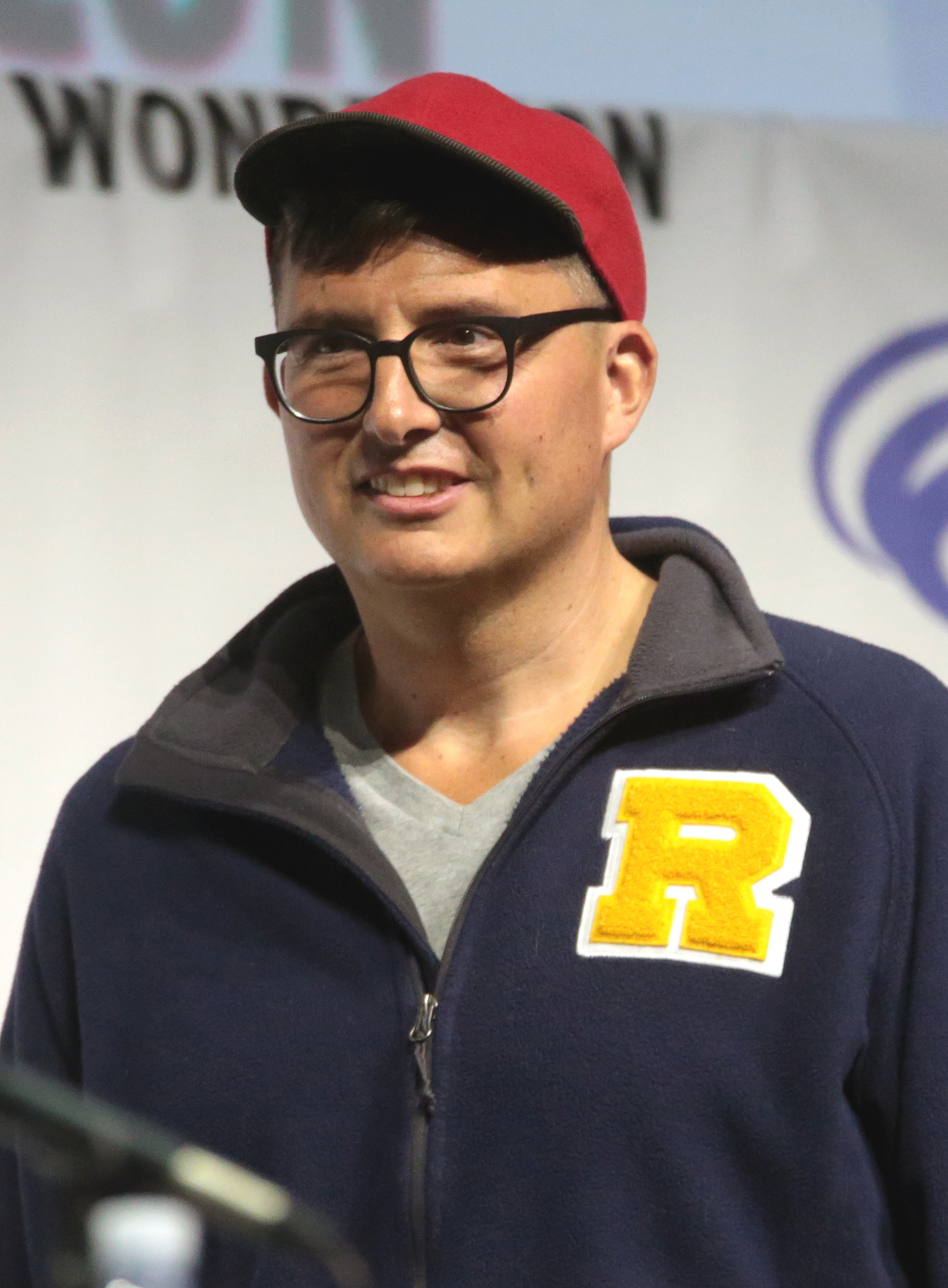
- Aguirre-Sacasa in 2019
- Born: 1973 (age 52–53)
- Education: Georgetown University (BA); McGill University (MA); Yale University (MFA)
- Occupations: Comic book writer, playwright, screenwriter

Roberto Aguirre-Sacasa (born 1973) is an American playwright, screenwriter, and comic book writer best known for his work for Marvel Comics and for the television series Glee (2011–14), Big Love (2009–11), Riverdale (2017–23), Chilling Adventures of Sabrina (2018–20) and Pretty Little Liars (2022–24). He is CCO of Archie Comics.

== Early life ==
Roberto Aguirre-Sacasa grew up in Washington, D.C., the son of the senior Nicaraguan World Bank official turned Nicaraguan Ambassador to the US (1997–2000) and later Foreign Minister (2000–2002) Francisco Javier Aguirre Sacasa and Maria de los Angeles Sacasa Arguello y Gomez Arguello, both Nicaraguan nationals. Aguirre-Sacasa received a Bachelor of Arts degree from Georgetown University and later a master's degree in English literature from McGill University in 1997.

Although he wrote some plays in high school, it was after college, while working as a publicist at the Shakespeare Theatre, that Aguirre-Sacasa had an opportunity to attend a week-long playwriting workshop under Paula Vogel at Arena Stage in Washington, D.C. He recalled in 2003 that Vogel held one of her periodic playwriting "boot camps" in the area:

...Paula's a great playwright and a really extraordinary teacher. So Arena invited other D.C. theaters to send their resident playwright to the boot camp. ... Michael Kahn, the Shakespeare's artistic director, had seen a couple of my really barebones productions that me and friends had thrown together here in D.C., and he asked me if I wanted to go. So I did this boot camp with Paula. At the end of it, Paula asked me, "Are you going to get serious about this?" I said I would like to, and she said, "I would get serious about it, right now." While I was working at the Shakespeare I had been writing plays like everyone else -- in the morning, after work, on weekends, but I really wasn't focusing on it.

Aguirre-Sacasa then applied to the Yale School of Drama, from which he graduated in 2003.

Early plays during his first year at Yale include Say You Love Satan, "a romantic comedy spoof of the Omen movies," and The Muckle Man, "a serious family drama with supernatural overtones," good reviews on summer productions of those helped him get a professional agent. Rough Magic, an interpretation of Shakespeare's The Tempest in which Caliban escapes from Prospero's island and finds himself in present day New York City, was produced during his last year at Yale.

== Career ==
=== Playwriting ===
On April 4, 2003, Dad's Garage Theatre Company in Atlanta was scheduled to debut Aguirre-Sacasa's new play, Archie's Weird Fantasy, which depicted Riverdale's most famous resident coming out of the closet and moving to New York. The day before the play was scheduled to open, Archie Comics issued a cease and desist order, threatening litigation if the play proceeded as written. Dad's Garage artistic director Sean Daniels said, "The play was to depict Archie and his pals from Riverdale growing up, coming out and facing censorship. Archie Comics thought if Archie was portrayed as being gay, that would dilute and tarnish his image." It opened a few days later as "Weird Comic Book Fantasy" with the character names changed. Aguirre-Sacasa would later develop the Riverdale television series as well as becoming Archie Comics' chief creative officer.

Other plays produced in 2003 were The Mystery Plays in New York, which had won a writing award the previous year from the Kennedy Center, and a hit production of Say You Love Satan at the 2003 New York International Fringe Festival.

Playwriting continued along with comic-book writing, with several productions of new and old works. In 2006, his semi-autobiographical Based on a Totally True Story (about a comic-book writer/playwright struggling with new-found success and boyfriend problems) was staged at the prestigious Manhattan Theatre Club in New York. When asked by The Advocate, "Which came first, being a comic-book geek or being gay?" he answered, "I would say I was probably a comic-book geek before I knew anything about being gay or straight. I certainly loved superheroes before I knew I was gay..." He also noted the play was, "thankfully", not about his current boyfriend.

Good Boys and True, about a graphic sex tape that begins circulating around an all-boys prep school outside Washington, D.C., premiered at Chicago's Steppenwolf Theatre in winter 2008.

In mid-2009, the Round House Theatre in Bethesda, Maryland, premiered his play The Picture of Dorian Gray, based on the novel by Oscar Wilde. That same year, Aguirre-Sacasa and artist Tonci Zonjic finished Marvel Comics' Marvel Divas miniseries, and he began working as a writer for the HBO series Big Love, a position he continued in 2010 during the show's fourth season. In February 2010, he was announced to write the book for the musical adaption of the novel American Psycho.

South Coast Repertory in Costa Mesa, California, presented the premiere of his play Doctor Cerberus in spring 2010. He also revised Robert Benton's musical It's a Bird...It's a Plane...It's Superman for the Dallas Theater Center production in Dallas, Texas, in June 2010.

In 2011, Aguirre-Sacasa was approached by the producers of the troubled Broadway musical Spider-Man: Turn Off the Dark to help rewrite its script.

In May 2011, Aguirre-Sacasa was hired as a co-producer and writer of Glee. Two months later, he was hired to write the comic book Archie meets Glee, published in 2013.

In April 2013, Aguirre-Sacasa wrote the book for a musical based on Bret Easton Ellis's novel American Psycho, which ran in London from December 3, 2013, to January 25, 2014. It later transferred and ran on Broadway for 27 previews and 54 performances

=== Comics ===
Aguirre-Sacasa grew up liking comic books, recalling in 2003, "My mom would take us out to the 7-Eleven on River Road during the summer, and we would get Slurpees and buy comics off the spinning rack. I would read them all over and over again, and draw my own pictures and stuff."

He began writing for Marvel Comics, he explained, when "Marvel hired an editor to find new writers, and they hired her from a theatrical agency. So she started calling theaters and asking if they knew any playwrights who might be good for comic books. A couple of different theaters said she should look at me. So she called me, I sent her a couple of my plays and she said 'Great, would you like to pitch on a couple of comic books in the works?'"

His first submissions were "not what [they were] interested in for the character[s]" but eventually he was assigned an 11-page Fantastic Four story, "The True Meaning of...," for the Marvel Holiday Special 2004. He went on to write Fantastic Four stories in Marvel Knights 4, a spinoff of that superhero team's long-running title; and stories for Nightcrawler vol. 3; The Sensational Spider-Man vol. 2; and Dead of Night featuring Man-Thing.

In May 2008 Aguirre-Sacasa returned to the Fantastic Four with a miniseries tie-in to the company-wide "Secret Invasion" storyline concerning a years-long infiltration of Earth by the shape-shifting alien race, the Skrulls, and an Angel Revelations miniseries with artists Barry Kitson and Adam Polina, respectively. He adapted for comics the Stephen King novel The Stand.

In 2013, he created Afterlife with Archie, depicting Archie Andrews in the midst of a zombie apocalypse; the book's success led to Aguirre-Sacasa being named Archie Comics' chief creative officer.

=== Film and television ===
Aguirre-Sacasa wrote the screen adaptation of the remake of Stephen King's Carrie, released in October 2013. In June 2013 was scheduled to write Warner Bros.' planned live-action Archie movie. He also wrote The Town That Dreaded Sundown, a metasequel to the cult-classic horror film of the same name.

Aguirre-Sacasa wrote for television episodes of Glee, Big Love and Looking. In addition, he is the series developer of Riverdale, Katy Keene, Chilling Adventures of Sabrina and Pretty Little Liars.

== Awards ==
He received GLAAD Media Award nominations for Golden Age and for Say You Love Satan, with the latter also winning a New York International Fringe Festival Excellence in Playwriting Award. He tied for a Harvey Award for Best New Talent for his work on Marvel Knights Four.

In 2020, Aguirre-Sacasa was awarded an Impact Award by the National Hispanic Media Coalition for his work as an "Outstanding Executive Producer".

== Works ==
=== Comics ===
- Spider-Man 2: The Official Comic Book Adaptation (2004)
- Marvel Knights 4 #1–27 (April 2004 – April 2006), continued as Four #28–30 (May 2006 – July 2006)
- Fantastic Four: Season One (2012)
- Nightcrawler #1–12 (Nov. 2004 – Jan. 2006)
- The Sensational Spider-Man vol. 2, #23–40 (July 2006 – Oct. 2007)
- Dead of Night featuring Man-Thing #1, 4 (April & July 2008)
- Secret Invasion: Fantastic Four #1–3 (July–Sept. 2008)
- Angel: Revelations #1–5 (July–Nov. 2008)
- The Stand: Captain Trips #1–5 (early Dec. 2008 – March 2009)
- The Stand: American Nightmares #1–5 (May–Oct. 2009)
- Marvel Divas #1–4 (Sept.–Dec. 2009)
- The Stand: Soul Survivors #1–5 (Dec. 2009 – May 2010)
- The Stand: Hardcases #1–5 (Aug. 2010 – Jan. 2011)
- Avengers Origins: Ant-Man and the Wasp No. 1 (November 2011)
- Loki vol. 2, #1–4 (four-issue miniseries) (Dec. 2010 - May 2011)
- The Stand: No Man's land #1–5 (April–Aug. 2011)
- The Stand: The Night Has Come #1–6 (Oct. 2011 – March 2012)
- Archie Meets Glee #641-644 (March 2013 - June 2013)
- Afterlife with Archie No. 1 - present (Oct. 2013–present)
- Chilling Adventures of Sabrina No. 1 - present (Oct. 2014– present)

=== Published plays ===
- The Mystery Plays, Dramatists Play Service, 2005, ISBN 978-0-8222-2038-1
- Say You Love Satan, Dramatists Play Service, 2005, ISBN 978-0-8222-2039-8
- Based on a Totally True Story, Dramatists Play Service, 2008, ISBN 978-0-8222-2224-8
- Dark Matters, Dramatists Play Service, 2009, ISBN 978-0-8222-2218-7
- Good Boys and True, Dramatists Play Service, 2009, ISBN 978-0-8222-2318-4
- King of Shadows, Dramatists Play Service, 2009, ISBN 978-0-8222-2356-6
- The Muckle Man, Dramatists Play Service, 2009, ISBN 978-0-8222-2333-7
- Rough Magic, Dramatists Play Service, 2009, ISBN 978-0-8222-2332-0
- The Velvet Sky, Dramatists Play Service, 2009, ISBN 978-0-8222-2331-3
- The Weird : a collection of short horror and pulp plays, Dramatists Play Service, 2008, ISBN 978-0-8222-2255-2
- Abigail/1702, Dramatists Play Service, 2017, ISBN 978-0-8222-3075-5
- American Psycho, Concord Theatricals

=== Television ===
| Year | Title | Credited as | | | | Network | Notes |
| Year | Title | Writer | Producer | Creator/Developer | Showrunner | Network | Notes |
|---|---|---|---|---|---|---|---|
| 2009–11 | Big Love | Yes | Yes | No | No | HBO | Writer: 3 episodes |
| 2011–2014 | Glee | Yes | Yes | No | No | Fox | Writer: 6 episodes |
| 2015 | Looking | Yes | Yes | No | No | HBO | Writer: 2 episodes |
| 2015–16 | Supergirl | Yes | Yes | No | No | The CW | Writer: 3 episodes |
| 2017–23 | Riverdale | Yes | Yes | Yes | Yes | The CW | Writer: 21 episodes; Director: "Chapter One Hundred Thirty-Seven: Goodbye, Riverdale" |
| 2018–20 | Chilling Adventures of Sabrina | Yes | Yes | Yes | Yes | Netflix | Writer: 10 episodes |
| 2020 | Katy Keene | Yes | Yes | Yes | No | The CW | Writer: 3 episodes |
| 2020 | The Brides | Yes | Yes | Yes | Yes | ABC | Unsold pilot |
| 2022–24 | Pretty Little Liars | Yes | Yes | Yes | Yes | HBO Max | |

=== Films ===
- Carrie (2013)
- The Town That Dreaded Sundown (2014)

== Productions ==
- Morning Becomes Olestra, Cherry Red Productions
- The Ten Minute Play About Rosemary's Baby, July 11, 2001, Summer Camp 7 Fest at Soho Rep, New York City
- Say You Love Satan, September 14, 2001, Dad's Garage Theatre Company, Atlanta, Georgia
- The Muckle Man, August 8, 2001, Source Theatre Company, Washington, DC.
- Weird Comic Book Fantasy, April 2003, Dad's Garage Theatre Company, Atlanta, Georgia
- Rough Magic, April 24, 2003, Yale School of Drama New Haven, CT
- The Mystery Plays, June 21, 2003, Second Stage Theater at McGinn/Cazale Theatre, New York City
- Dark Matters, December 3, 2003, Source Theatre Company, Washington, D.C.
- Golden Age, 2005, Horse Trade Theater Group/Tobacco bar Theatre Company at Kraine Theater, New York City
- Rough Magic (world premiere), July 29, 2005, Hanger Theatre, Ithaca, NY
- The Velvet Sky, January 30, 2006, Woolly Mammoth Theatre, Washington D.C.
- Bloody Mary, April 6, 2006, The Thursday Problem at 45th Street Theatre, New York City
- Based on a Totally True Story, April 11, 2006, Manhattan Theatre Club, New York City
- King of Shadows, 2006, The Working Theater, Arena Stage, Washington, D.C.
- The Muckle Man (revised), January 25, 2007, City Theatre, Pittsburgh, Pennsylvania
- Rough Magic (revised), January 27, 2007, Rorschach Theatre at Casa del Pueblo Methodist Church, Washington D.C.
- The Picture Of Dorian Gray September 9, 2009, Round House Theatre, Bethesda, Maryland
- The Weird (NYC Premiere), February 9–10, 2010, Manhattan Source Theatre, NYC
- Doctor Cerberus, April 11, 2010, South Coast Repertory, Costa Mesa, California
- It's a Bird, It's A Plane, It's Superman! (revised book), June 18, 2010, Dallas Theater Center Dallas, TX,
- The Weird, January 19, 2012, 12 Peers Theater, Pittsburgh, Pennsylvania
- Abigail/1702, May 9, 2013, City Theatre, Pittsburgh, Pennsylvania
- The Weird (First NYC Revival), April 11–13, 2019, The Brick Theatre, NYC
