= Edvin Biuković =

Croatian comics artist

- Born: 22 June 1969 Zagreb, SR Croatia, SFR Yugoslavia
- Died: 5 December 1999 (aged 30) Zagreb, Croatia
- Areas: Penciller, Inker
- Notable works: Grendel Tales; Human Target
- Awards: Eisner Awards 1995 (Promising Newcomer)

Edvin Biuković (22 June 1969 – 5 December 1999) was a Croatian comics artist.

== Biography ==
Biuković made his debut in 1987 with the strip Dokaz published in the third issue of Croatian magazine Patak. He spent several more years working on comic projects in Croatia and collaborated with his good friend Darko Macan on the pages of German magazine Gespenster Geschichten. Most of those stories were later translated to Croatian (and collected into one volume titled Citati), as well as English (reprinted in various issues of Caliber's Negative Burn).

His big break came in 1994 when Dark Horse published Grendel Tales: Devils and Deaths, his another collaboration with Macan. The pair were subsequently asked back to do a four-issue sequel, Devil's Choices. In 1995, Biuković was nominated in the Best Penciller/Inker category and awarded the Russ Manning Best Newcomer Award in 1995.

In December 1999, he died suddenly of a brain tumor in his hometown Zagreb, two weeks after it was initially diagnosed. Edvin Biuković was thirty years old. Prior to his death, he was working on yet another project with Macan titled Silver Sun as well as a short story that was posthumously released in Vertigo's Weird War Tales Special.

Many people have cited Biuković as their influence, including My Chemical Romance singer and comic book writer Gerard Way (The Umbrella Academy, The True Lives of the Fabulous Killjoys) as well as fellow Croatian artist Goran Sudžuka (Outlaw Nation, Wonder Woman). Esad Ribić was referred by Biuković to DC/Vertigo.

== Bibliography ==
Interior comic work includes:

- Grendel Tales (with Darko Macan, Dark Horse):
  - Devils and Deaths #1-2 (1994)
  - Devil's Choices #1-4 (1995)
- Star Wars (Dark Horse):
  - X-Wing Rogue Squadron #5-8 (with Michael Stackpole and Darko Macan, 1996)
  - The Last Command #1-6 (with Mike Baron and Timothy Zahn, 1997–1998)
- Human Target #1-4 (with Peter Milligan, Vertigo, 1999)
- Strange Adventures vol. 2 #2: "Third Toe, Left Boot" (with Bruce Jones, anthology, Vertigo, 1999)
- Weird War Tales Special: "A Prayer to the Sun" (with Darko Macan, anthology one-shot, Vertigo, 2000)

=== Covers only ===
- Strange Adventures vol. 2 #3 (Vertigo, 2000)
- Flinch #10 (Vertigo, 2000)
