= Fibra =

Croatian comic book publisher

Fibra d.d.
- Company type: Public
- Industry: Publishing
- Founded: Zagreb, Croatia (2006)
- Founder: Marko Šunjić
- Headquarters: Zagreb, Croatia
- Products: Comic Books
- Website: www.fibra.hr

Fibra (lit. 'Fever') is a Croatian comic book publisher. It was established in 2006 by Marko Šunjić in Zagreb. Apart from domestic titles, it is focused on publishing lesser and more known titles from all around the world. The house also presented at the book fair Interliber.
