= Timeline of Marvel Comics =

History of American comic book publications

Marvel Comics began as Timely Comics in 1939. It became Atlas Comics in 1951 and changed to its current name in 1961.

Years of comic book releases are not precise, as comic book cover dates are sometimes listed in the early months of the following year.

== 1930s ==
=== 1936 ===
- Martin Goodman begins publishing the Ka-Zar magazine, introducing a character of the same name inspired by Tarzan.

=== 1938 ===
- Martin Goodman publishes Marvel Science Stories #1. This is the first of several periodicals to include "Marvel" in the title.

=== 1939 ===
- Martin Goodman founds Timely Comics on January 12. He collaborates with Funnies Inc. to produce his earliest comic books.
- Marvel Comics #1 is published on August 31. The first Timely comic about superheroes, it introduces the Angel, the Human Torch android, Ka-Zar, the Masked Raider, and Namor The Sub-Mariner.
- Marvel Comics is renamed Marvel Mystery Comics, beginning with issue #2.
- Joe Simon becomes editor-in-chief of Timely Comics.

== 1940s ==
=== 1940 ===
- Jack Kirby, a longtime collaborator with Joe Simon, is hired at Timely Comics. Alex Schomburg begins working as the main cover artist at Timely, beginning with Marvel Mystery Comics #3 and Daring Mystery Comics #1.
- Martin Goodman hires his wife's cousin, Stanley Lieber, as an assistant to Joe Simon and Jack Kirby. Lieber is allowed to help write at Timely. Not wanting to associate his name with comic books, seen as low art, Lieber adopts the pen name Stan Lee.
- Marvel Mystery Comics #8 features a fight between Namor and the Human Torch, marking the first time that two Timely superheroes met.
- Daring Mystery Comics #1 and Red Raven Comics #1 are published. Red Raven is the first Timely character to have a titular comic book. Red Raven Comics is then renamed Human Torch Comics and features Human Torch stories instead of Red Raven. In his first standalone issue, Human Torch is given a teenage sidekick, Toro.
- Captain America Comics #1 introduces Captain America, featuring cover art depicting him punching Adolf Hitler in the face.
- Mystic Comics #4 introduces Thin Man and Claire Voyant, and Marvel Mystery Comics #13 introduces Aarkus (Vision).

=== 1941 ===
- The Sub-Mariner Comics #1 and All Winners Comics #1 are published.
- Captain America Comics #7 introduces its first major supervillain, Captain America's nemesis Red Skull. A different character called Red Skull had appeared in issue #1.
- Captain America Comics #4 introduces a group of child superheroes, the Sentinels of Liberty. They are renamed as the Young Allies and given their own series, Young Allies Comics.
- Daring Mystery Comics #7 introduces Blue Diamond and Fin, U.S.A. Comics #1 introduces Jack Frost and Whizzer, Captain America Comics #6 introduces Father Time, and Mystic Comics #6 introduces the Destroyer.
- "The World Faces Destruction" is published in The Human Torch #5, created by approximately one dozen writers and artists.
- Joe Simon and Jack Kirby leave Timely Comics. Stan Lee becomes editor-in-chief at 18 years old.

=== 1942 ===
- Much of Timely's staff leaves to serve in World War II. Vincent Fago briefly serves as editor-in-chief while Stan Lee is away.
- Timely enters the market of comedy comic books with Joker Comics #1 by Basil Wolverton, introducing Powerhouse Pepper. Daring Mystery Comics shifts to comedy stories beginning with issue #9 and is renamed Comedy Comics.
- Timely begins creating animal characters reminiscent of theatrical animated shorts. Krazy Komics #1 introduces Ziggy Pig and Silly Seal, created by Al Jaffee. It also licenses Terrytoons characters and begins publishing Terry-Toons Comics.
- Timely begins publishing an eight-issue Miss Fury series by reprinting the character's Sunday comic strips.

=== 1943 ===
- Otto Binder writes Kid Komics, featuring Captain Wonder, but it lasts only two issues.
- Comedy Comics #14 introduces Waffles the Super Rabbit, combining the superhero and cartoon animal genres. Super Rabbit becomes one of Timely's most popular characters of the decade.
- All Select Comics begins publication, featuring Captain America, Human Torch, and Namor stories.
- Marvel Mystery Comics #49 introduces the Captain America pastiche Miss America. Created by writer Otto Binder and artist Al Gabriele, she is Timely's first original female superhero.

=== 1944 ===
- The film serial Captain America is released as the first adaptation of a Timely character. Directed by John English and Elmer Clifton, the serial is released across 15 episodes by Republic Pictures beginning in February 1944. Besides the title and imagery, no elements of Captain America's story or character were retained.
- Miss America Comics #1 is published featuring Miss America. Its title is changed to Miss America Magazine in issue #2, and it then becomes a general magazine marketed toward girls without the Miss America character. The second issue introduces Patsy Walker and her supporting cast, who become the central characters in Timely's teenage humor comics.
- Gay Comics is created by Basil Wolverton and Harvey Kurtzman.
- The character Tessie the Typist receives her own comic series with Tessie the Typist #1.
- Comic Capers and Ideal Comics begin publication, both featuring Super Rabbit.
- Krazy Komics is renamed Animal Funny Tunes and Daring Mystery Comics is renamed Daring Comics.

=== 1945 ===
- Timely moves away from superhero comics as sales decline, and it begins marketing itself primarily toward young girls. Captain America's U.S.A. Comics is canceled after 17 issues.
- Stan Lee returns from World War II and resumes his position as editor-in-chief.
- Animated Movie-Tunes and Funny Frolics begin publication, featuring Timely's animal cartoon characters.
- Patsy Walker #1 is published, featuring the character Patsy Walker.
- Millie the Model and Nellie the Nurse begin publication.

=== 1946 ===
- Timely moves away from cartoon animals amid declining popularity and changes its cartoon comics to teen comedies. Ideal Comics is replaced by Willie Comics, and Animated Movie-Tunes is briefly renamed Movie Tunes Comics before it is replaced by Frankie in its fourth issue.
- Gene Colan begins working as a penciller at Timely.
- Harvey Kurtzman begins writing "Hey Look!", a one-page humor comic strip appearing in several Timely publications.
- The All-Winners Squad is introduced in All-Winners Comics #19, featuring Bucky Barnes, Captain America, the Human Torch, Miss America, Namor, Toro, and the Whizzer. Written by Bill Finger, the team is retired after a second appearance in issue #21.
- All Select Comics #11 introduces the Blonde Phantom, and the series is renamed Blonde Phantom Comics in the following issue. She will be a major character for the remainder of the 1940s.

=== 1947 ===
- Timely stops branding its comics as "Timely Comics". A few issues are branded as "A Marvel Magazine" and "Marvel Comic", but these are short-lived.
- Timely begins publishing crime comics as the genre becomes more popular. Sub-Mariner Comics is replaced with Official True Crime Comics and Wacky Duck is replaced with Justice.
- Marvel Mystery Comics #82 introduces Namor's partner Namora, created by Ken Bald and Syd Shores.
- The characters Ziggy Pig and Silly Seal are retired.

=== 1948 ===
- Stan Lee hires John Buscema as an artist.
- Timely begins publishing editorials to rebut the arguments of Frederic Wertham and other anti-comics activists.
- Stan Lee creates several female superheroes to market the genre toward girls. Sun Girl receives a three-issue series and became the Human Torch's sidekick in another four. The Sea Beauty Namora runs for three issues as a standalone series for Namora. Venus #1 introduces the character Venus. This series also features the company's first adaptation of the Norse gods Thor and Loki.
- Timely begins publishing Western comic books. Two-Gun Kid, created by Syd Shores, introduces the Two-Gun Kid as a singing cowboy. A second Western series, Kid Colt, Hero of the West, introduces the character Kid Colt; the series is renamed Kid Colt, Outlaw with its third issue.
- Timely begins publishing romance comics with My Romance.

=== 1949 ===
- Timely increases its output of romance comics. The superhero comics The Blonde Phantom, The Human Torch, and Sub-Mariner Comics are replaced by Lovers, Love Tales, and Best Love, respectively. Timely begins publishing the romance comics Actual Romances, Cupid, Faithful, Love Adventures, Love Dramas, Love Secrets, Love Trials, Molly Manton's Romances, My Diary, My Love, Our Love, Romance Tales, and Young Hearts. The company also begins publishing the romance westerns Cowboy Romances, Romances of the West, Rangeland Love, and Western Life Romances.
- Captain America is renamed Captain America's Weird Tales in issue #75. Instead of Captain America, the issue features an anthology of unrelated mystery-horror stories. The series is then discontinued. This is recognized as the end of Timely's superhero comics.
- Marvel Mystery Comics, the company's first comic series, is renamed Marvel Tales beginning with issue #93.
- Timely creates two new western comics: Best Western and True Western. The former is renamed Western Outlaws and Sheriffs after two issues.
- Harvey Kurtzman stops freelancing with Timely, and his "Hey Look!" comic strip ends.

== 1950s ==
=== 1950 ===
- As World War II era paper rations are lifted, Martin Goodman implements a strategy of producing numerous publications based on whatever genre was trending at the time until it floods the market.
- Two-Gun Western #5 introduces Apache Kid. The character then receives his own series when Reno Browne, Hollywood's Greatest Cowgirl is renamed Apache Kid with issue #53. The series is one of the few western genre publications of the time to portray distinctions between Native American tribes.
- Marvel Boy #1 introduces Marvel Boy.

=== 1951 ===
- Timely creates several war genre publications in response to the Korean War. In addition to anthology series, Combat Kelly #1 introduces Combat Kelly as its main character.
- Marvel Boy is renamed Astonishing with issue #3. Marvel Boy remains a character through issue #6, after which it becomes a horror series.
- The monster horror series Strange Tales begins publication.
- Timely Comics rebrands itself as Atlas Comics. While this is officially the name given to Martin Goodman's distribution company when he founds it in December, it becomes the informal name of the publisher and appears on the covers of its publications.

=== 1952 ===
- Atlas publishes nearly 400 issues in one year, setting a record that will last until the 1990s. Many short-lived series are created and then discontinued. Several genres are given multiple publications, including war, romance, horror, crime, western, and teen comedies. The war genre dominates the lineup as the Korean War continues, which also brings about comics about Cold War espionage.
- Apache Kid and Venus both end.
- The monster horror series Journey Into Mystery begins publication.
- Patsy and Hedy begins publication as Patsy Walker's first spinoff series.
- The character Super Rabbit is retired as Timely phases out its cartoon animal characters.

=== 1953 ===
- Atlas moves away from war comics as the Korean War ends. Young Men On the Battlefield reverts to its previous name Young Men with issue #21. Martin Goodman then decides to revive the Timely superheroes after the television series Adventures of Superman brings new attention to the genre. Young Men #24 reintroduces the android Human Torch.
- Atlas publishes a short series of anti-communist Captain America stories. These are later redefined through retroactive continuity to be about another character—William Burnside—acting as Captain America.
- Wild Western #26 introduces Ringo Kid.
- Patsy and Her Pals becomes the second spinoff series for Patsy Walker.
- Lorna The Jungle Queen begins publication, featuring the jungle girl character Lorna.
- Atlas makes several short-lived attempts to expand its offerings: it begins a religious publication in Bible Tales For Young Folk, a traditional science fiction publication in Speed Carter, Spaceman, and a response to Mad Magazine and other humor publications in Crazy. All of these only last a few issues.

=== 1954 ===
- Martin Goodman tasks Stan Lee with writing and editing new stories. Among Lee's contributions are new stories featuring Captain America, the Human Torch, and Namor.
- The Comics Code Authority is established. To comply with the organization's morality standards, Marvel moves away from horror stories toward other genres, such as science fiction and westerns.
- World's Greatest Songs Illustrated #1 is published, featuring visual adaptations of popular songs.
- Outlaw Kid #1 introduces Outlaw Kid, illustrated by Doug Wildey.

=== 1955 ===
- Rawhide Kid and Wyatt Earp begin publication as new western series, introducing the fictional cowboy Rawhide Kid and an adaptation of the historical lawman Wyatt Earp. The latter becomes Atlas's best-selling western of the decade, in part because it followed the success of the television series The Life and Legend of Wyatt Earp.
- Black Knight #1 introduces Sir Percy of Scandia, written by Stan Lee and illustrated by Joe Maneely.
- Sub-Mariner ends with issue #42, marking the final appearance of a classic Timely superhero under the Atlas brand.
- SNAFU #1 begins publication as a satirical magazine. It introduces Irving Forbush, who will later become Marvel's comedic mascot Forbush Man.
- Stan Lee and Dan DeCarlo create My Girl Pearl, a series about a dumb blonde that runs for four issues.
- Della Vision introduces the television star Della. She is replaced by a similar character, Patty Powers, after three issues.
- Atlas adapts Pinky Lee into a comic book.

=== 1956 ===
- A decline in comic book sales leads Martin Goodman to lower the rates Atlas pays freelances. Similar decreases throughout the industry lead comic artists to change careers.
- World of Suspense, World of Fantasy, and World of Mystery enter publication, taking advantage of the popular Jacques Cousteau documentary The World of Science.
- Sergeant Barney Barker runs for three issues, illustrated by John Severin.
- Yellow Claw #1, written by Al Feldstein and illustrated by Joe Maneely, introduces the Yellow Claw character inspired by Yellow Peril fiction. Jack Kirby returns to Atlas as the artist on issue #2.
- Martin Goodman closes his distribution company, forcing Atlas Comics to look elsewhere for distribution.

=== 1957 ===
- Atlas Comics outsources its distribution to the American News Company. This distributor closes soon after, and Atlas goes to National Periodical Publications (later DC Comics) for distribution. Atlas stops accepting new work until it enters its contract with National Periodical Publications. They negotiate a ten year deal in which the company will publish only eight issues per month. With its options drastically reduced, Atlas switches to a bimonthly publication schedule so it can run a total of 16 series. It cancels the remainder, approximately 60 to 70 titles. Previously finished work on the canceled series is included piecemeal in the remaining publications.
- After canceling most of its publications, Atlas retains Battle, Gunsmoke Western, Homer The Happy Ghost, Kid Colt Outlaw, Love Romances, Marines in Battle, Millie the Model, Miss America, My Own Romance, Navy Combat, Patsy Walker, Patsy and Hedy, Strange Tales, Two-Gun Kid, World of Fantasy, and Wyatt Earp.

=== 1958 ===
- Stan Lee takes responsibility for writing almost all of the company's remaining series, occasionally delegating to his brother Larry Lieber or another freelancer. The lightened workload means that Lee is able to be more selective about which artists he works with. His chosen team includes Dick Ayers, Steve Ditko, Stan Goldberg, Al Hartley, Don Heck, Jack Kirby, Larry Lieber, and Paul Reinman. This group makes up the first members of what will later be called the Marvel Bullpen.
- Artist Joe Maneely, one of Stan Lee's most frequent collaborators and the company's unofficial mentor for new artists, dies in an accident.
- Stan Lee and Jack Kirby begin using the Marvel method, where Lee writes a plot outline, Kirby draws the art, and Lee then writes the dialogue.
- Two military genre titles are replaced with mystery and science-fiction: Journey Into Mystery returns to publication with issue #49, replacing Marines In Battle, and Strange Worlds begins publication, replacing Navy Combat. Strange Worlds, inspired by the Space Race, is the first new title since the company was limited to 16.

=== 1959 ===
- The science fiction series Tales of Suspense and Tales to Astonish begin publication, replacing Homer The Happy Ghost and Miss America. The new series prominently feature destructive monsters as their villains to capitalize on the success of monster films like Godzilla. Journey Into Mystery begins publishing similar stories beginning with issue #54, primarily illustrated by Jack Kirby.
- A Date With Millie and Kathy begin publication, replacing Strange Worlds and World of Fantasy. Stan Goldberg draws the art for these new teen humor comics, also taking on Millie the Model.

== 1960s ==
=== 1960 ===
- The company's final war genre title, Battle, ends with issue #70, concluding a nine-year run. It is replaced by My Girl Pearl, which resumes with issue #7.
- Rawhide Kid returns to publication with issue #17, drawn by Jack Kirby. The series introduces a new character to play the role of Rawhide Kid. It replaces Wyatt Earp, which ended with issue #29.
- My Own Romance is renamed Teen-Age Romance beginning with issue #77. Vince Colletta, who had worked on previous issues of the series, becomes the primary artist.
- Journey Into Mystery #62 introduces the company's first character to be called Hulk. The character is later renamed Xemnu the Titan.
- A Date With Millie is renamed Life With Millie starting with issue #8.

=== 1961 ===
- Atlas Comics renames itself Marvel Comics.
- National Periodical increases Marvel's cap on monthly publications, and Amazing Adventures begins publication. It is renamed Amazing Adult Fantasy with issue #7 to feature more sophisticated fantasy stories aimed at an older audience.
- Strange Tales #89 introduces the monster Fin Fang Foom, whose popularity eventually leads to his return to fight Marvel superheroes.
- Martin Goodman allegedly has a conversation with another comic book executive while golfing, where he learns that DC Comics is revitalizing its superhero comics. He asks Stan Lee to create a superhero team comic similar to DC's Justice League. Lee creates Fantastic Four, introducing the Fantastic Four: Mister Fantastic, Invisible Girl (later Invisible Woman), Human Torch, and the Thing. This inaugurates the modern age of Marvel Comics. The series gains popularity for its portrayal of interpersonal drama alongside traditional superhero storytelling.

=== 1962 ===
- Marvel begins receiving fan mail praising Fantastic Four, prompting Stan Lee to approve new superhero comics.
- Several of Marvel's core characters are introduced, including the Hulk in The Incredible Hulk #1 and Spider-Man in Amazing Fantasy #15. Thor is introduced in Journey into Mystery #83, and his nemesis Loki is introduced in issue #85.
- Hank Pym, who had first appeared in Tales to Astonish #27, is reintroduced as the superhero Ant-Man in issue #35.
- Namor is reintroduced into the Marvel Universe in Fantastic Four #4.
- Doctor Doom is introduced as the nemesis of the Fantastic Four in Fantastic Four #5. He is the first traditional supervillain in Marvel's new line of superhero comics. Other Fantastic Four villains make their first appearances, including the shapeshifting alien Skrulls in issue #2, the hypnotist Miracle Man in issue #3, the mind-controlling Puppet Master in issue #8, and the inventor Wizard in Strange Tales #102.
- Two-Gun Kid resumes publication with issue #60 with a new version of the character.

=== 1963 ===
- The Marvel Comics branding is first used, accompanied with Marvel's signature corner boxes on the front cover of each publication.
- Marvel begins publishing fan letters in its comic books. Stan Lee's secretary, Flo Steinberg, writes replies to publish alongside them. An announcements page, the Bullpen Bulletins, begins appearing shortly after.
- Marvel's primary cast of characters expands with the introduction of Iron Man in Tales of Suspense #39 and Doctor Strange in Strange Tales #111. X-Men #1 introduces the X-Men with its original roster of Angel, Beast, Cyclops, Iceman, and Marvel Girl, led by Professor X. The Wasp is introduced as Ant-Man's partner in Tales to Astonish #44. Nick Fury and his supporting cast are introduced in Sgt. Fury And His Howling Commandos, a war comic based on the tone and characterization used in Fantastic Four. The supporting character Uatu the Watcher is introduced in Fantastic Four #13.
- Spider-Man receives his own ongoing series, The Amazing Spider-Man, following positive reception to his story in Amazing Fantasy #15. It replaces The Incredible Hulk.
- The Avengers begins publication, bringing together Thor, Hulk, Iron Man, Ant-Man, and the Wasp as the superhero team the Avengers. They are brought together by the Teen Brigade, a group of teenagers who alert superheroes of danger, that was introduced in The Incredible Hulk #6.
- Ant-Man is reintroduced as Giant-Man.
- Fantastic Four Annual #1 redefines Namor's character to make him the King of Atlantis and introduces his supporting cast.
- Stan Lee and Jack Kirby first appear as fictional versions of themselves in Fantastic Four #10.
- Fantastic Four #12 confirms a shared universe between Marvel's new superheroes when the Fantastic Four meet the Hulk. The Fantastic Four then appear in The Amazing Spider-Man #1 the same month.
- A second set of Thor stories, "Tales of Asgard", begins appearing alongside the main Thor stories starting with Journey Into Mystery #97.
- Recurring villains are introduced. The Amazing Spider-Man introduces the Chameleon in issue #1, the Vulture and the Tinkerer in issue #2, Doctor Octopus in issue #3, the Sandman in issue #4, and the Lizard in issue #6. Fantastic Four introduces Impossible Man in issue #11, the Red Ghost in issue #13, the Mad Thinker in issue #15, Molecule Man in issue #20, and Hate-Monger in issue #21. Other introductions include Tyrannus in The Incredible Hulk #5, Thor's villain Radioactive Man in Journey Into Mystery #93, Doctor Strange's nemesis Baron Mordo in Strange Tales #111, Iron Man villain Kala in Tales of Suspense #43, Iron Man villain Jack Frost (later Blizzard) in Tales of Suspense #45, and Magneto in X-Men #1.

=== 1964 ===
- Captain America is reintroduced for modern Marvel Comics in The Avengers #4, and he replaces Hulk in the Avengers' roster. Captain America stories begin appearing in Tales of Suspense beginning in issue #59, sharing the magazine with Iron Man stories. He also appears in a crossover with Nick Fury in Sgt. Fury And His Howling Commandos #13, set in World War II.
- Daredevil begins publication, introducing the blind superhero Daredevil as designed by Bill Everett.
- Tales of Suspense issues #52 and #57 introduce the Black Widow and Hawkeye, respectively. Originally depicted as villains, both switch sides and becomes superheroes.
- The Avengers #9 introduces Wonder Man. He dies in the issue but will be revived about a decade later.
- Marvel prints Hulk stories in Tales to Astonish, beginning with issue #60. These stories share the series with Giant-Man stories.
- Doctor Doom's backstory is defined in Fantastic Four Annual #2, revealing that his mother was a witch, establishing a personal history with Mr. Fantastic, and introducing the nation of Latveria over which he rules.
- Marvel launches its official fan club, the Merry Marvel Marching Society.
- Recurring villains are introduced. The Amazing Spider-Man introduces Electro in issue #9, Frederick Foswell and the Enforcers in issue #10, the Green Goblin in issue #14, and Kraven the Hunter in issue #15. The Avengers introduces the Captain America villain Baron Zemo and his Masters of Evil in issue #6, and Kang the Conqueror in issue #8. Journey Into Mystery introduces the Thor villains the Enchantress and the Executioner in issue #103, and the Grey Gargoyle in issue #107. Other introductions include Baron Strucker in Sgt. Fury And His Howling Commandos #5, the Doctor Strange villain Dormammu in Strange Tales #126, Iron Man's nemesis the Mandarin in Tales of Suspense #50, and Hulk's villain the Leader in Tales to Astonish #62. X-Men #3 introduces the Blob. X-Men #4 introduces the Brotherhood of Evil Mutants, which includes Magneto, Scarlet Witch and Quicksilver, Mastermind and Toad. Scarlet Witch and Quicksilver go on to be superheroes in later stories.

=== 1965 ===
- Roy Thomas begins working at Marvel Comics.
- The Avengers reorganizes its roster for the first of many times when the founding members are replaced by the reformed villains Hawkeye, Scarlet Witch, and Quicksilver. The change is made because the main characters' standalone stories create continuity problems with The Avengers.
- Strange Tales #135 introduces the spy agency S.H.I.E.L.D., and Sergeant Nick Fury is reintroduced as Nick Fury, Agent of S.H.I.E.L.D. These stories replace the Human Torch stories in Strange Tales.
- Stories featuring Namor begin publication in Tales to Astonish, replacing the series's Giant-Man stories. They are written by Stan Lee and illustrated by Gene Colon (under the name Adam Austin).
- The design for Daredevil is updated to a red costume, replacing his original yellow costume.
- The wedding of Mr. Fantastic and the Invisible Woman takes place in Fantastic Four Annual #3.
- The Amazing Spider-Man #28 sees Spider-Man graduate high school. He attends college in issue #31, where he meets his love interest Gwen Stacy and his friend Harry Osborn. Spider-Man's other primary love interest, Mary Jane Watson, had been introduced in issue #25 but her face was kept hidden to preserve the mystery of what she looked like.
- Supporting characters are introduced, including Thor's allies the Warriors Three in Journey Into Mystery #119, Hercules and the Olympian gods in Journey Into Mystery Annual #1, the Inhumans in Fantastic Four #45, and Ravonna Renslayer in The Avengers #23. The 1930s character Ka-Zar is reinvented for modern Marvel Comics in X-Men #10. David Rand is replaced by Kevin Plunder.
- Recurring villains are introduced. The Amazing Spider-Man introduces the Scorpion in issue #20, Crime Master in issue #26, and Molten Man is issue #28. The Avengers introduces Count Nefaria and his Maggia crime organization in issue #13, the Swordsman in issue #19, and Power Man in issue #21. Daredevil #8 introduces Stilt-Man. Fantastic Four introduces Dragon Man in issue #35 and the Frightful Four in issue #36, with the latter including the Inhuman Medusa in her first appearance before reforming as a hero. Journey Into Mystery introduces Thor's villains Absorbing Man in issue #114 and the Destroyer in issue #118. Tales to Astonish #73 introduces Hulk's enemy Qnax (later Amphibion). X-Men #12 introduces Professor X's stepbrother Juggernaut, and discrimination against mutants becomes a recurring theme in the franchise with the introduction of the Sentinels in X-Men #14.

=== 1966 ===
- The Marvel Super Heroes premieres as the first cartoon adaptation of Marvel characters. A series of republications branded as Marvel Super Heroes are created to supplement the adaptation.
- Kirby and Lee expand Marvel's cosmic world with the introduction of Galactus in Fantastic Four #48–50, the "Galactus Trilogy". Silver Surfer is introduced in the same story, and a four-part story arc in Fantastic Four #57–60 has Doctor Doom steal the powers of the Silver Surfer.
- Fantastic Four #52 introduces Black Panther as Marvel's first black superhero and establishes the nation of Wakanda.
- The Spider-Man story "If This Be My Destiny...!" by Steve Ditko is published in The Amazing Spider-Man #31–33.
- Steve Ditko leaves Marvel Comics, and he is replaced by John Romita Sr. as the artist for The Amazing Spider-Man beginning in issue #39. Before taking over, Romita auditions by drawing Spider-Man, Aunt May, and J. Jonah Jameson when they appear in Daredevil #16–17. Romita's first two issues of The Amazing Spider-Man redefine the relationship between Spider-Man and Green Goblin, making Green Goblin his primary nemesis when they discover one another's secret identities. Green Goblin is revealed to be Norman Osborn.
- New supporting characters are introduced, including Captain America's love interest Sharon Carter in Tales of Suspense #75, Human Torch's friend Wyatt Wingfoot in Fantastic Four #51, and the first full appearance of Mary Jane Watson in The Amazing Spider-Man #42.
- Two major crossover fights are published when Fantastic Four Annual #4 has the Fantastic Four's Human Torch and the 1940s android Human Torch meet and fight, while The Amazing Spider-Man Annual #3 has Spider-Man fight the Hulk in an ill-fated attempt to join the Avengers.
- Sgt. Fury And His Howling Commandos #27 reveals why Nick Fury wears an eye patch in his post-war appearances, and issue #34 provides an origin story for the Howling Commandos.
- Fantasy Masterpieces premieres as a republication of older comic book stories. The first two issues republish 1950s and 1960s monster and suspense stories, and it begins republishing 1940s stories with issue #3.
- Lancer Books begins publishing paperback printings of Marvel stories.
- Marvel begins licensing its characters for merchandise.
- Recurring villains are introduced. The Amazing Spider-Man introduces the Looter in issue #36 and the Rhino in issue #41. The Avengers introduces the Collector in issue #28, the Sons of the Serpent in issue #32, and the Living Laser in issue #34. Daredevil introduces Plunderer in issue #12, the Masked Marauder in issue #16, and Gladiator in issue #18. Fantastic Four introduces the Inhumans villain Maximus in issue #47 and the Black Panther villain Klaw in issue #53. The Mighty Thor introduces Pluto in issue #127 and Ego the Living Planet in issue #132. Strange Tales #141 introduces the Fixer and Mentallo. Tales of Suspense introduces the Captain America villains Batroc the Leaper in issue #75, and the Super-Adaptoid in issue #82. Tales to Astonish #81 introduces Boomerang. Tales of Suspense #79 reintroduces Captain America's World War II era nemesis, the Red Skull.

=== 1967 ===
- "Stan's Soapbox" is introduced as a place on the Bullpen Bulletins page for Stan Lee to communicate to readers about Marvel and its philosophy.
- Two cartoons based on Marvel characters premiere: Spider-Man and The Fantastic Four.
- Jim Steranko becomes the main artist for Nick Fury stories. He introduces psychedelic art to comics, as well as greater permissiveness of sex and violence, and he creates the first four-page spread.
- The Ghost Rider begins publication, introducing the character who will later be renamed Phantom Rider.
- Two major cosmic characters are introduced: Adam Warlock as "Him" in Fantastic Four #66 and Mar-Vell in Marvel Super-Heroes #12. Strange Tales #157 introduces Marvel's cosmic entity the Living Tribunal.
- X-Men #28 introduces the Irish mutant Banshee as the first character in a series of non-American mutants created by writer Roy Thomas.
- The story "Spider-Man No More" is published in The Amazing Spider-Man #50.
- The Spider-Man supporting character Robbie Robertson is introduced in The Amazing Spider-Man #51. The supporting character Frederick Foswell is killed in the following issue.
- The Avengers #47 features a battle between the Avengers and Magneto, pitting Scarlet Witch and Quicksilver against their former boss, whom they will later discover is their father.
- Thor's series is reorganized in the "Troll–Asgard War" story arc, moving the primary setting from Earth to Asgard and replacing the love interest Jane Foster with Sif. Sif is first introduced in The Mighty Thor #136.
- Daredevil adopts a second secret identity to avoid suspicion that he is a superhero, pretending to be his own identical twin.
- The character Red Guardian, Black Widow's ex-husband, dies in The Avengers #43.
- The 13-issue parody series Not Brand Echh premieres.
- Recurring villains are introduced. The Amazing Spider-Man introduces Shocker in issue #46, the Abomination form of Emil Blonsky in issue #47, the new Vulture Blackie Drago in issue #48, and Kingpin in issue #50. Fantastic Four introduces Blastaar in issue #62, the Kree Sentry in issue #64, and the Psycho-Man in Annual #5. The Mighty Thor introduces Ulik the troll in issue #137 and the Growing Man in issue #140. Strange Tales reintroduces Nick Fury's villain Baron Strucker in a modern setting as the leader of Hydra in issue #156 and reintroduces Yellow Claw as a modern character in issue #161. Tales of Suspense #94 introduces MODOK. Tales to Astonish #90 reintroduces Namor's villain from Atlas comics, Prince Byrrah. X-Men introduces Cobalt Man in issue #31 and the Changeling in issue #35.

=== 1968 ===
- The distributor for Marvel Comics, Independent News, loosens its restriction on how many ongoing series the company can publish at once. This allows Marvel to move away from anthology series and shared books. Standalone series are established for Captain America, Doctor Strange, Iron Man, Namor the Sub-Mariner, Nick Fury, and the Silver Surfer. To inaugurate the new publications, a one-shot issue, Iron Man and Sub-Mariner #1, is released featuring the final respective half-issue stories of Iron Man and Namor the Sub-Mariner. With 24 monthly publications, Stan Lee declares this the "Second Age of Marvel Comics".
- Responding a decrease in sales, Stan Lee issues a rule that there can be no further changes in the status quo of Marvel's characters.
- Two characters from Sgt. Fury and His Howling Commandos receive new series: Nick Fury, Agent of SHIELD moves from Strange Tales to its own publication, and Captain Savage appears in the spinoff Captain Savage and his Leatherneck Raiders. The latter's title changes to Captain Savage and His Battlefield Raiders with issue #9.
- The Perfect Film and Chemical Corporation (later Cadence Industries) purchases Marvel Comics from Martin Goodman for approximately $15 million (equivalent to $139,000,000 in 2025). Goodman remains publisher.
- Stan Lee retires his nickname for rival companies, "Brand Echh", as Marvel has become larger than them.
- Several main and supporting characters are introduced. Roy Thomas creates a new Black Knight character, Dane Whitman, introducing him in The Avengers #47–48; Black Knight receives his own story in Marvel Super Heroes #17. The Amazing Spider-Man #56 introduces George Stacy, the father of Spider-Man's love interest Gwen Stacy. X-Men #44 reintroduces the Timely character Red Raven for modern audiences. Marvel Super-Heroes #16 introduces the Phantom Eagle with a story set in World War I. The Vision is introduced in The Avengers #57 and joins the Avengers in the following issue. X-Men #49 introduces Polaris. The Avengers #59 introduces what appears to be a new villain, Yellowjacket, who is revealed to be Hank Pym's new alter ego in a fit of madness.
- Fantastic Four Annual #6 sees the birth of Franklin Richards, the mutant son of Invisible Woman and Mr. Fantastic. Invisible Woman goes on maternity leave in Fantastic Four #81, and she is temporarily replaced in the Fantastic Four by the Inhuman Crystal.
- Marvel publishes two magazines: The Adventures of Pussycat and Groovy. Spider-Man is also given an ongoing black-and-white magazine, The Spectacular Spider-Man, but it ends after two issues.
- X-Men #42 features the death of Professor X. Despite the tagline describing the story as "Not a hoax! Not a dream! Not an imaginary tale!", the Professor X seemingly killed is revealed to be the shapeshifter Changeling.
- Recurring villains are introduced. These include Wonder Man's villainous brother the Grim Reaper in The Avengers #52, Ultron in The Avengers #54–55, Doctor Faustus in Captain America #107, the Jester in Daredevil #42, Annihilus in Fantastic Four Annual #6, the Wrecker in The Mighty Thor #148, Mangog in The Mighty Thor #154, Nick Fury's villainous brother Scorpio in Nick Fury, Agent of SHIELD #1, the Badoon aliens in Silver Surfer #2, Mephisto in Silver Surfer #3, Tiger Shark in Sub-Mariner #5, Iron Man villains Madame Masque and Whiplash in Tales of Suspense #97, the Namor villain Destiny in Tales to Astonish #101, and Mesmero in X-Men #49.

=== 1969 ===
- Marvel revisits genres where it had seen previous success. The teen comedy Millie the Model is given two spinoffs: Mad About Millie and Chili. New horror comics include Tower of Shadows and Chamber of Darkness, and new romance comics include My Love and Our Love Story.
- Marvel Super-Heroes #18 introduces the original Guardians of the Galaxy, featuring Charlie-27, Martinex, Vance Astro, and Yondu.
- The character Rick Jones becomes the new sidekick for Captain America, but the arrangement lasts only three issues. He then becomes a sidekick for Mar-Vell.
- Gene Colan redesigns Doctor Strange in a more traditional superhero costume with a mask.
- The wedding of Ant-Man and the Wasp takes place in The Avengers #60.
- X-Men #54 introduces Havok, the brother of Cyclops.
- The character Hawkeye is reintroduced as Goliath, taking the name and powers of Hank Pym's former alter ego, in The Avengers #63.
- Captain America #117 introduces the Falcon as Marvel's first African–American superhero.
- The fictional metal adamantium is first referenced in The Avengers #66.
- An origin story for Galactus is published in The Mighty Thor #162.
- Daredevil #57 has Daredevil reveal his secret identity to his love interest Karen Page.
- Sub-Mariner #19 has the character Walter Newell become the Stingray.
- Recurring villains are introduced. The Amazing Spider-Man introduces the Kingpin's wife Vanessa Fisk in issue #70, Silvermane in issue #73, and the Prowler in issue #78. The Avengers introduces the Black Panther villain Man-Ape in issue #62, the Grandmaster in issue #69, and the Justice League pastiche Squadron Sinister in issue #69. Other introductions include Madame Hydra in Captain America #110, Stunt-Master in Daredevil #58, Torpedo in Daredevil #59, the Glob in The Incredible Hulk #121, Controller in Iron Man #12, Ghost in Silver Surfer #8, Living Pharaoh (later named the Living Monolith) in X-Men #54, and Sauron in X-Men #60.

== 1970s ==
=== 1970 ===
- Jack Kirby leaves Marvel Comics.
- Supporting characters are introduced, including the governess Agatha Harkness in Fantastic Four #94, the Japanese mutant Sunfire in issue #64, Marvel's first Native American superhero Red Wolf in The Avengers #80, and Hulk's ally Jim Wilson in The Incredible Hulk #131. Nick Fury is revived in The Avengers #72, and Professor X is revived in X-Men #65. The supporting character George Stacy is killed in The Amazing Spider-Man #90.
- Black Widow is reintroduced as a superhero in The Amazing Spider-Man #86.
- X-Men is cancelled after issue #66 for poor sales. Further issues of the series reprint previous X-Men stories.
- Marvel publishes two shared comic books. Amazing Adventures features Black Widow, written by Gary Friedrich and drawn by John Buscema, and the Inhumans, written and drawn by Jack Kirby. Astonishing Tales features Doctor Doom, written by Roy Thomas and drawn by Wally Wood, and Ka-Zar, created by Stan Lee and Jack Kirby.
- Roy Thomas and Barry Windsor-Smith begin adapting Conan the Barbarian as a Marvel character in the series of the same name. This becomes the first of many sword and sorcery comics by Marvel.
- The series Captain Marvel is revived by writer Roy Thomas and drawn by Gil Kane. It runs for two issues and is then canceled again.
- Fantastic Four #100 is published, marking the first of Marvel's modern series to reach its hundredth issue.
- Fantastic Four #105 has Invisible Woman's maternity leave end, and she resumes her place in the Fantastic Four that had been occupied by Crystal.
- Marvel's approach to politics begins to shift in Iron Man #27, when Iron Man breaks from his pro-government stance and shows sympathy for the anti-establishment villain Firebrand.
- Iron Man #21 has a black man, Eddie March, wear the Iron Man armor as a stand-in for Tony Stark.
- Roy Thomas writes a story in The Avengers #73 addressing racial conflict, where Black Panther is framed as a criminal.
- The Incredible Hulk #124 features the wedding of Bruce Banner and Betty Ross, but the story ends without their marriage when Banner turns into the Hulk.
- Recurring villains are introduced, including the Schemer in The Amazing Spider-Man #83, the Ka-Zar villain Garokk in Astonishing Tales #2, Arkon in The Avengers #75, and Llyra in Sub-Mariner #32.

=== 1971 ===
- Steve Englehart begins working for Marvel Comics.
- Mego Corporation purchases licensing rights to produce Marvel action figures.
- The United States Department of Health, Education and Welfare asks Marvel Comics to publish a story about the dangers of drug addiction. "Green Goblin Reborn!" is published in The Amazing Spider-Man #96–98, portraying Harry Osborn as a drug addict. This violates the rules of the Comics Code Authority, and the issues are published without its seal. The storyline's commercial success and Marvel's willingness to deviate from its rules leads the Comics Code Authority to relax its standards on a variety of subjects. Revisions on the rules about monsters leads Marvel to publish more horror comics.
- The Six Arms Saga begins in The Amazing Spider-Man #100 when a serum causes Spider-Man to grow four extra arms. The following issue introduces Morbius, a vampire created through science to avoid the Comics Code Authority's restriction on undead vampires.
- Roy Thomas begins writing the "Kree–Skrull War", the first major event-style story published by Marvel Comics. The story arc begins in The Avengers #89 and runs for nine issues. This is Marvel's longest running story arc to this point.
- Savage Tales begins publication, printed in a magazine format so the Comics Code Authority regulations are not applicable. The first issue introduces Man-Thing.
- Marvel Spotlight begins publication. The first issue introduces Johnny Wakely as a new version of the Red Wolf.
- The Defenders is introduced as a new team in Marvel Feature #1, featuring Doctor Strange, Hulk, and Namor the Sub-Mariner.
- The Avengers #85 introduces the Squadron Supreme as a superhero counterpart to the Squadron Sinister, featuring American Eagle, Lady Lark, Tom Thumb, and the Whizzer.
- The classic Namor supporting character Namora is introduced to modern comics.
- Captain America is re-titled Captain America and the Falcon in issue #134, promoting a black superhero to title character.
- Significant stories are published featuring the Hulk. The Hulk #137 adapts Moby-Dick, set in outer space. Science fiction writer Harlan Ellison plots a story for The Avengers #88 and The Incredible Hulk #140 where the Hulk visits the Microverse and is temporarily cured of his transformations. Hulk then meets supporting character Doc Samson in issue #141.
- The wedding of Namor and Dorma takes place in Sub-Mariner #36, ending with Dorma's death at the hands of Llyra.
- The villain Gog is introduced in The Amazing Spider-Man #103, and the Spymaster in Iron Man #33.

=== 1972 ===
- Martin Goodman retires as publisher at Marvel Comics, and he is replaced by Stan Lee. Roy Thomas is chosen by Lee to succeed him as editor-in-chief. Thomas becomes writer for Fantastic Four at the same time, beginning with issue #126.
- Luke Cage is introduced as a Blaxploitation-inspired character to explore themes such as poverty and racism. This was the first of Marvel's black superheroes to have his own series, and the first of several more grounded superhero characters introduced in the 1970s.
- The Tomb of Dracula begins publication. This is made possible by the updates to the Comics Code Authority's standards on monsters, and the series becomes one of Marvel's most critically acclaimed of the 1970s. The first issue is written by Roy Thomas and Gerry Conway, and illustrated by Gene Colan.
- The Claws of the Cat begins its four-issue run, written by Linda Fite and drawn by Marie Severin. Starring the Cat, it is Marvel's first ongoing superhero series to feature a female lead. Two more female-led series, Night Nurse and Shanna the She-Devil, premiere the same year.
- Marvel Spotlight #2 introduces Werewolf by Night. Originally conceived by Roy Thomas, the issue is written by Gerry Conway and drawn by Mike Ploog.
- Marvel Spotlight #5 introduces Ghost Rider.
- The character Adam Warlock, still described as "Him", is reintroduced in Marvel Premiere #1 as the savoir of Counter-Earth. He then receives his own series, The Power of Warlock, by writer Roy Thomas and artist Gil Kane.
- New standalone stories are published for Doctor Strange, beginning in Marvel Premiere #3.
- X-Men's Beast is given a standalone story in Amazing Adventures #11. This issue reintroduces Beast in his furred design. Amazing Adventures #13 reintroduces Patsy Walker from Timely's teen comedies.
- The supervillain Thanos is introduced in Iron Man #55.
- The Kree–Skrull War storyline ends in Avengers #97.
- Temporarily rejecting Marvel's typical setting of New York, the characters of Daredevil and the Black Widow are relocated to San Francisco.
- Bill Everett returns to Namor as writer and artist of Sub-Mariner #50. He introduces Namor's cousin Namorita.
- Writer Steve Englehart uses Captain America and the Falcon #153 to rectify Captain America's continuity, revealing that the Captain America active in the 1950s was an anti-communist imposter.
- Adventure Into Fear begins publishing stories featuring Man-Thing, starting with issue #10.
- Millie the Model, Marvel's longest-running series at the time, ends after a 27-year run with 207 issues.
- Marvel's sales numbers exceed those of DC Comics for the first time.

=== 1973 ===
- Gerry Conway writes "The Night Gwen Stacy Died" in The Amazing Spider-Man #121–122. The death of Spider-Man's girlfriend Gwen Stacy subverts expectations by killing a major supporting character and love interest. The decision was made by Marvel's creatives as a group, with John Romita Sr. suggesting Gwen be the character to die instead of Spider-Man's Aunt May.
- Several new superheroes are introduced, including Howard the Duck in Adventure Into Fear #19, the Vietnamese martial artist Mantis in The Avengers #112,, Valkyrie The Defenders #4, Moondragon under the name Madame MacEvil in Iron Man #54, the half-demon Daimon Hellstrom in Marvel Spotlight #12, Shang-Chi in Shang-Chi, Master of Kung Fu #1, Blade in Tomb of Dracula #10,
- Amazing Adventures #18 introduces Killraven, set in a reality where the aliens of The War of the Worlds conquered Earth. The series is renamed Killraven beginning with issue #29.
- Marvel begins publishing its fan magazine FOOM (Friends of Ol' Marvel) by Jim Steranko.
- Dracula Lives! begins publication as an anthology series featuring Marvel's version of Dracula.
- Marvel publishes its first crossover event with "Avengers/Defenders War".
- Writer Gary Friedrich and artist Mike Ploog create an adaptation of Frankenstein's monster.
- Mike Friedrich and Jim Starlin introduce the royal family of Titan: Thanos, Mentor, and Eros. Starin then writes the "Thanos War" storyline in Captain Marvel #25–33, establishing Thanos as a major villain.
- Tales of the Zombie begins publication, revitalizing the 1953 character Zombie. Astonishing Tales #21 begins publishing stories for the 1961 character It! The Living Colossus, which continue for the next six months.
- Jungle Action begins featuring Black Panther stories with issue #6. It begins with the "Panther's Rage" storyline overseen by writer Don McGregor, where Black Panther fights against Erik Killmonger.

=== 1974 ===
- Len Wein becomes editor-in-chief of Marvel Comics.
- Several major characters are introduced, including the Punisher in The Amazing Spider-Man #129, Iron Fist in Marvel Premiere #15, and Wolverine in The Incredible Hulk #181. Other significant introductions include Deathlok in Astonishing Tales #25 and Wendigo in The Incredible Hulk #181.
- Captain America changes his identity to Nomad in Captain America and the Falcon #175 after losing faith in the United States. This is in response to discovering the identity of the villainous Secret Empire's leader, whom writer Steve Englehart said was implied to be U.S. president Richard Nixon. Captain America resumes his previous role after deciding that the United States is not defined by its politicians.
- Giant-Size Avengers #1 reintroduces the Timely superhero Whizzer and introduces his son Nuklo.
- Several characters are given new series, including Dracula in Giant-Size Chillers, Ka-Zar in Ka-Zar, Man-Thing in The Man-Thing, Shang-Chi in The Deadly Hands of Kung Fu, and Werewolf by Night in Giant-Size Creatures. Giant-Size Chillers and Giant-Size Creatures each run for a single issue before they are retitled Giant-Size Dracula and Giant-Size Werewolf, respectively.
- Lilith is introduced as a supporting character for Dracula in Giant-Size Chillers #1.
- The Cat is reintroduced as Tigra in Giant-Size Werewolf #1.
- Harry Osborn becomes the Green Goblin in The Amazing Spider-Man #135–137, redefining Harry's character and the role of the Green Goblin legacy.
- The X-Men characters Professor X and Magneto appear in The Defenders #16–17, introducing Alpha the Ultimate Mutant.
- The Avengers #129 and Giant-Size Avengers #2 feature a battle between Kang the Conqueror and his future incarnation Rama-Tut. This story will serve as an influence for the acclaimed "Kang Dynasty" storyline.
- The Amazing Spider-Man #130 gives Spider-Man a car, the Spider-Mobile, as part of a merchandising agreement. The following issue features a storyline where Spider-Man's Aunt May attempts to marry Doctor Octopus.
- Doctor Strange #4 features a storyline where Doctor Strange goes inside the Orb of Agamotto and gives himself over to Death, but is revived after meeting with the Ancient One.
- Marvel begins publishing the underground comix anthology series Comix Book, edited by Denis Kitchen.
- Recurring villains are introduced, including Nitro in Captain Marvel #34, Wrecker and the Wrecking Crew in Defenders #17, Silver Samurai in Daredevil #111, and the Foolkiller in The Man-Thing #3.

=== 1975 ===
- Marvel's parent company orders the creation of a superhero team with characters from several countries. Len Wein and Dave Cockrum create Giant-Size X-Men #1, introducing the characters Colossus, Nightcrawler, and Storm, putting them on a team with Cyclops and Wolverine. Chris Claremont then begins his run on the revitalized X-Men series with these characters, turning X-Men into a major franchise. The character Thunderbird is also introduced with the team but is killed off shortly after in X-Men #95.
- Jack Kirby returns to work at Marvel Comics after his five-year absence.
- Invaders begins publication, featuring new stories that take place in the 1940s with Captain America, Human Torch, and Namor. The series is drawn by Frank Robbins in a style reminiscent of the 1940s Timely Comics books.
- The Marvel Presents anthology series begins publication.
- Super-Villain Team-Up begins publication.
- Moon Knight is introduced in Werewolf By Night #32, and Ulysses Bloodstone is introduced in Marvel Presents #1. The supporting character Moira MacTaggert is introduced in X-Men #96.
- The first "Clone Saga" story runs in Spider-Man comics.
- Giant-Size Avengers #4 features two weddings: that of Scarlet Witch and Vision and that of Mantis and Swordsman. This marks the finale of Mantis's "Celstial Madonna" story arc.
- Marvel begins adapting classic science fiction stories in Unknown Worlds of Science Fiction.
- The 1950s character Marvel Boy is reintroduced as Crusader and then killed off in Fantastic Four.
- The Avengers #142 features a crossover between the Avengers and Marvel's western characters: Kid Colt, Rawhide Kid, Two-Gun Kid, and Phantom Rider.
- Adam Warlock receives his own series starting with Strange Tales #178. The series features Adam Warlock stories for four issues before Warlock is revived with its ninth issue.
- The character Steve Rogers is restored as Captain America, abandoning the name Nomad.
- The Champions are introduced in The Champions #1, diverging from Marvel's usual New York setting to Los Angeles. The team includes Angel, Black Widow, Ghost Rider, Hercules, and Iceman.
- The character of Howard the Duck is revived in Giant-Size Man Thing $4.
- The X-Men character Beast joins the roster of The Avengers in issue #137, becoming the first X-Men character to move to a different superhero team.
- Marv Wolfman becomes editor-in-chief of Marvel Comics.

=== 1976 ===
- Gerry Conway becomes editor-in-chief of Marvel Comics, but he steps down months later to continue writing. Archie Goodwin then becomes editor-in-chief .
- Steve Englehart leaves Marvel Comics.
- Jack Kirby writes The Eternals, a space opera that introduces the Eternals, the Celestials, and the Deviants.
- Chris Claremont writes the "Phoenix Saga" in X-Men #100–101, introducing the Phoenix Force and its connection to Jean Grey.
- The teen humor character Patsy Walker is reintroduced as a superhero, Hellcat.
- Howard the Duck receives his own series with Howard the Duck #1. The series includes a story by Steve Gerber in which Howard the Duck runs for president, which becomes an immediate success.
- The original Guardians of the Galaxy are given their own series in Marvel Presents, including the newly-introduced Starhawk.
- Roy Thomas follows up Invaders with another team of Marvel's World War II superheroes, the Liberty Legion, in Marvel Premiere #29. It includes Blue Diamond, Jack Frost, Miss America, Patriot, Red Raven, Thin Man, and Whizzer. He also introduces Union Jack in The Invaders #7 as a British World War II superhero.
- Captain Britain is created as an original character for the Marvel UK imprint, which previously republished other Marvel stories. His sister Betsy Braddock, later the superhero Psylocke, is introduced in Captain Britain #8.
- Nova is introduced in The Man Called Nova #1 to establish a new teenage superhero.
- Superman Vs. The Amazing Spider-Man is released. It is the first crossover between DC Comics and Marvel.
- Spider-Man becomes the main character of three ongoing series at once with the release of Peter Parker, The Spectacular Spider-Man #1.
- A crossover between Doctor Strange and The Tomb of Dracula, both illustrated by Gene Colan, appears in issues #14 and #44, respectively.
- Omega the Unknown begins publication but proves unsuccessful.
- Doug Moench and Mike Ploog introduce Weirdworld as a fantasy story in Marvel Super Action #1.
- Marvel publishes a ten-issue adaptation of 2001: A Space Odyssey, the first of several adaptations into comic books by Marvel.

=== 1977 ===
- Marvel begins publishing a licensed series of Star Wars comic books based on the film of the same name. The agreement is made prior to the film's premiere and success. The popularity of Star Wars drives high sales for the comic series, making up for Marvel's overall decline in sales. The series also becomes an early example of the Star Wars Expanded Universe as it continues beyond the events of the film.
- Ms. Marvel begins publication, establishing the character of Carol Danvers as Marvel's most prominent female superhero.
- The Rampaging Hulk is created by writer Doug Moench and illustrator Walt Simonson as a black-and-white magazine that immediately follows the original 1962 Incredibly Hulk series.
- Thanos is first depicted seeking the Infinity Gems, then called the Soul Gems, in a story written by Jim Starlin across Avengers Annual #7 and Marvel Two-in-One Annual #2.
- Black Panther begins publication, giving the titular character an ongoing series.
- Stan Lee and John Romita Sr. create a syndicated The Amazing Spider-Man comic strip.
- Several superheroes are introduced, including Spitfire in The Invaders #12, Spider-Woman is introduced in Marvel Spotlight #32. 3-D Man in Marvel Premiere #35, Brian Falsworth in The Invaders #18, Among supervillains, Graviton is introduced in The Avengers #158, Arnim Zola in Captain America And The Falcon #209, Doctor Bong in Howard the Duck #15, and Sabretooth in Iron Fist #14.
- Artist Dave Cockrum ends his tenure as pencilist for X-Men with issue #107, which introduces the Imperial Guard and the Starjammers. He is succeeded by John Byrne.
- The first live action television adaptations of Marvel superheroes premiere: The Amazing Spider-Man and The Incredible Hulk. The Incredible Hulk stars Bill Bixby as David Banner and Lou Ferrigno as Hulk.
- The Howard the Duck presidential candidate story arc ends in issue #8.
- Marvel publishes comic book adaptations of the Godzilla franchise, the cast of Saturday Night Live, the band Kiss, and the toy-lines Micronauts, Shogun Warriors, and Rom the Space Knight.

=== 1978 ===
- Jim Shooter becomes editor-in-chief of Marvel Comics. He takes a top-down approach to the company's stories, giving editorial edicts and eventually having individual series coalesce around crossover events.
- Shooter writes "The Korvac Saga" in The Avengers #167–177, featuring the Avengers and the original Guardians of the Galaxy.
- Devil Dinosaur #1 is published, introducing Devil Dinosaur and Moon-Boy. This is Jack Kirby's last major introduction for Marvel.
- Spider-Woman #1 is written by Marv Wolfman and illustrated by Carmine Infantino as a standalone series for Spider-Woman.
- Jack Kirby publishes Machine Man #1, adapting Kirby's character Machine Man whom he had introduced in his adaptation of 2001: A Space Odyssey.
- Mystique first appears in Ms. Marvel #16. Her blue-skinned design first appears in issue #18.
- In their final collaboration, Stan Lee and Jack Kirby create Marvel's first graphic novel, The Silver Surfer. It is published by Fireside Books.
- Marvel reorganizes its The Rampaging Hulk series into The Hulk! to capitalize on Hulk television series.
- The supporting character Karla Sofen is reintroduced as Moonstone in The Incredible Hulk #228.
- Ms. Marvel is redesigned by Chris Claremont and Dave Cockrum, replacing her unpopular costume design.
- Iron Man's love interest Bethany Cabe is introduced in The Invincible Iron Man #117. As a bodyguard, she represents a shift toward stronger female characters.
- The Marvel UK character Captain Britain appears in American comics for the first time in Marvel Team-Up #65, which also introduces the villain Arcade.
- X-Men #109 introduces Weapon Alpha, later known as Guardian.
- The animated television series The New Fantastic Four premieres on NBC, replacing the Human Torch with the original character H.E.R.B.I.E.
- The film Dr. Strange loosely adapts Doctor Strange as a failed television pilot.

=== 1979 ===
- David Michelinie and Bob Layton write "Demon in a Bottle" in Iron Man #120–128, depicting Iron Man as an alcoholic.
- The character Scott Lang becomes the new Ant-Man in Marvel Premiere #47–48.
- Black Cat is introduced as a rival and love interest for Spider-Man in The Amazing Spider-Man #194. She is developed by Marv Wolfman, who was inspired by the animated film Bad Luck Blackie.
- Frank Miller begins his run on Daredevil with issue #158.
- The animated television series Spider-Woman premieres on ABC.
- The Eternals are formally established as part of the Marvel universe in a crossover with Thor in The Mighty Thor #284.
- The backstory of Scarlet Witch and Quicksilver is written in The Avengers #186, revealing them to be the children of Magneto and Magda.
- Canadian artist John Byrne introduces the Canadian superhero team Alpha Flight in The Uncanny X-Men #120.
- The storyline of Omega the Unknown is concluded in The Defenders #77, two years after the series was abruptly canceled.
- The character Man-Thing is revitalized in a new The Man-Thing series.
- The character H.E.R.B.I.E., an original creation for the Fantastic Four animated series, is adapted to the comics in Fantastic Four #209.
- The Uncanny X-Men #125 introduces Proteus.
- The film Captain America loosely adapts the character of the same name.
- Marvel Two-in-One introduces Wundarr the Aquarian.
- The Uncanny X-Men #117 introduces Shadow King. The following issue introduces Wolverine's love interest Mariko Yashida.
- The Invincible Iron Man introduces the Iron Man villain Justin Hammer.

== 1980s ==
=== 1980 ===
- Jack Kirby leaves Marvel Comics for the second time after leaving in 1970 and returning in 1975.
- The Epic Illustrated magazine begins publication. Separate from Marvel's comic book publications, the magazine can feature more mature stories in the style of Heavy Metal.
- The Savage She-Hulk #1 by Stan Lee and John Buscema introduces She-Hulk, the cousin of Hulk.
- Captain America #250 brings presidential politics to Captain America when he is asked to run for president.

=== 1981 ===
- Elektra is introduced in Daredevil #168.
- Rogue is introduced as a villain in The Avengers Annual #10.
- John Byrne takes over as the writer for Fantastic Four. He rewrites Invisible Woman to move away from her portrayal as a damsel in distress.
- Marvel Productions is created to produce television series based on Marvel characters. It produces Spider-Man and His Amazing Friends and syndicates episodes of Spider-Man.

=== 1982 ===
- Wolverine is created by Chris Claremont and Frank Miller as a limited series starring the character of the same name.
- Cloak and Dagger are introduced in The Spectacular Spider-Man #64.
- Elektra is killed in Daredevil #181.
- The Amazing Spider-Man Annual #16 introduces Monica Rambeau as the new Captain Marvel.
- Marvel Super Hero Contest of Champions is released, featuring numerous Marvel characters in conflict with one another. It had originally been written as a tie-in with the 1980 Summer Olympics, but it was temporarily shelved following a a boycott of the Olympics by the United States.
- Marvel Productions produces a new television series, The Incredible Hulk, featuring narration by Stan Lee.

=== 1983 ===
- The backstory of Quicksilver and the Scarlet Witch is changed so that Magneto is their father.
- The character James Rhodes replaced Tony Stark as Iron Man in Iron Man #170.
- Marvel Age, a magazine featuring updates and other content from Marvel Comics, begins publication.
- Beta Ray Bill claims the hammer Mjolnir from Thor.

=== 1984 ===
- Secret Wars begins publication. Spider-Man's black suit debuts in issue #8.
- A team of superhero children, the Power Pack, is introduced in a series of the same name by Louise Simonson and June Brigman.
- Machine Man, originally created by Jack Kirby for a comic book adaptation of 2001: A Space Odyssey, is introduced to the Marvel Universe with a limited series by Barry Windsor-Smith.

=== 1985 ===
- Despite the poor critical reception of Secret Wars, its strong sales lead Marvel to publish a sequel, Secret Wars II.
- Tony Stark returns as the main character of Iron Man in issue #200.
- Spider-Ham is introduced in the Star Comics series Peter Porker, The Spectacular Spider-Ham.
- Marvel publishes Heroes for Hope to raise awareness of African famines and raise money for relief efforts.

=== 1986 ===
- New World Entertainment purchases Marvel Comics.
- The Punisher is popularized after starring in a limited series of the same name.
- Incredible Hulk #319 features Hulk's wedding to his love interest, Betty Ross.
- Howard the Duck is adapted into a film by Willard Huyck, Howard the Duck.

=== 1987 ===
- Tom DeFalco becomes editor-in-chief of Marvel Comics. He reverses Jim Shooter's policy of standardization, instead giving more creative freedom to writers and artists.
- The Punisher begins publication as an ongoing series following the success of Punisher's limited series in 1986.
- The "Armor Wars" storyline (originally titled "Stark Wars") runs from Iron Man #225 to issue #231.
- The Amazing Spider-Man Annual #21 features the wedding of Spider-Man and Mary Jane Watson. To celebrate the event, Stan Lee officiates a mock wedding between actors dressed as Spider-Man and Mary Jane at a baseball game in Shea Stadium.
- A Spider-Man balloon is added to the lineup of the Macy's Thanksgiving Day Parade.

=== 1988 ===
- A new volume of Wolverine is published, following the 1982 volume as an ongoing series by Chris Claremont and John Cuscema.
- The Punisher War Journal begins publication as a second Punisher series running concurrently with The Punisher.
- Nick Fury vs. S.H.I.E.L.D. is published, popularizing the character of Nick Fury.
- The Avengers runs its storyline "The Evolutionary War".
- The Incredible Hulk Returns premieres as the first television film spinoff of the TV series The Incredible Hulk. The film introduces its version of Thor.

=== 1989 ===
- John Byrne returns to work at Marvel Comics.
- Excalibur is created by Chris Claremont and Alan Davis, featuring a team of X-Men and British superheroes.
- Ronald Perelman purchases Marvel Comics.
- The Acts of Vengeance storyline runs in Avengers Spotlight.
- The film The Punisher is released, directed by Mark Goldblatt and starring Dolph Lundgren as the Punisher.
- The Trial of the Incredible Hulk premieres as the second television film spinoff of the TV series The Incredible Hulk. The film introduces its version of Daredevil.

== 1990s ==
=== 1990 ===
- The Death of the Incredible Hulk premieres as the third television film spinoff of the TV series The Incredible Hulk.
- The New Mutants #87 introduces Cable.
- Namor The Sub-Mariner begins publication, created by John Byrne.
- A new Ghost Rider series begins publication, introducing the character Danny Ketch as the new Ghost Rider.
- A new Spider-Man series, titled Spider-Man, is published by writer and artist Todd McFarlane.

=== 1991 ===
- The Punisher War Zone begins publication as the third concurrently running Punisher series.
- X-Force is created by Rob Liefeld, introducing the X-Men spinoff team X-Force as a continuation of the New Mutants.
- Frank Miller reintroduces Elektra with the graphic novel Elektra Lives Again.
- The New Mutants #98 introduces Deadpool as a supervillain.
- Barry Windsor-Smith creates the "Weapon X" story in Marvel Comics Presents, revealing the origin of Wolverine.
- Writer Jim Starlin and artists Ron Lim and George Pérez publish The Infinity Gauntlet.
- Marvel introduces the character Darkhawk.

=== 1992 ===
- Claremont ends his run on X-Men after 17 years.
- Jim Lee, Rob Liefeld, and Todd McFarlane leave Marvel Comics to co-found Image Comics.
- X-Men: The Animated Series premieres on television to wide success.
- The Marvel 2099 imprint begins publication featuring alternate versions of Marvel characters set in the future. Spider-Man 2099 is the imprint's first publication.
- Writer Jim Starlin and artist Ron Lim publish The Infinity War as a sequel to The Infinity Gauntlet.
- Marvel Comics creates its first openly gay character when Northstar comes out in Alpha Flight #106.
- The Amazing Spider-Man #361 introduces Carnage.

=== 1993 ===
- Marvels is published. Written by Kurt Busiek and drawn by Alex Ross, it provides an overview of the Marvel Universe's history and is highly successful.
- Writer Jim Starlin and artist Ron Lim publish The Infinity Crusade as a sequel to The Infinity Gauntlet and The Infinity War.
- J. M. DeMatteis and Sal Buscema publish The Spectacular Spider-Man #200, featuring the death of the character Harry Osborn.
- The West Coast Avengers #100 features the death of Mockingbird. The series ends two issues later.
- The villain Deadpool is reintroduced as the main character of his own limited series with writer Fabian Nicieza and artist Joe Madureira.

=== 1994 ===
- Tom DeFalco resigns as editor-in-chief, and the position is reformed so there are five editors, each overseeing their own department: Bob Budiansky, Bobbie Chase, Mark Gruenwald, Bob Harras, and Carl Potts.
- A clone of Spider-Man, Ben Reilly, becomes the superhero Scarlet Spider.
- Peter David and Gary Frank write a story about HIV/AIDS in which the character Jim Wilson dies of the disease in The Incredible Hulk #420.
- The animated television series Spider-Man premieres.

=== 1995 ===
- Bob Harras becomes editor-in-chief of Marvel Comics.
- Age of Apocalypse begins publication as one of Marvel's largest crossover events, pausing the series of the X-Men franchise.
- The Amazing Spider-Man #400 features the death of Spider-Man's Aunt May.

=== 1996 ===
- Marvel Comics files for Chapter 11 Bankruptcy. Ronald Perelman and Carl Icahn fight over ownership of the company.
- Marvel ends publication of The Avengers, Captain America, Fantastic Four, Iron Man, and Thor. It begins a new series for each, with the exception of Thor, as part of its "Heroes Reborn" branding that sets them in an alternate dimension. This allows Marvel to restructure or disregard aspects of continuity that hindered the writing.
- Jim Lee and Rob Liefeld return to Marvel to head the "Heroes Reborn" process with full creative control.
- The character Elektra appears as the main character in the series Elektra.

=== 1997 ===
- An ongoing series starring Deadpool begins publication.
- The Marvel Knights imprint begins with the publication of a new Daredevil series and its "Guardian Devil" storyline written by filmmaker Kevin Smith and drawn by Joe Quesada. Its success prompts Marvel to begin hiring more filmmakers as writers.

=== 1998 ===
- Toy Biz buys Marvel Comics out of its bankruptcy.
- Blade becomes the first major success for a Marvel film adaptation. The film stars Wesley Snipes as Blade.
- What If? #105 introduces Spider-Girl and the MC2 universe set in an alternate future.
- John Byrne creates the miniseries Spider-Man: Chapter One to retell Spider-Man's origin story.

=== 1999 ===
- Inhumans #5 introduces Yelena Belova as the Black Widow.
- Jim Krueger, John Paul Leon, and Alex Ross create the 12-issue series "Earth X".

== 2000s ==
=== 2000 ===
- Joe Quesada becomes editor-in-chief of Marvel Comics.
- The Ultimate Marvel imprint debuts. It is inaugurated with Ultimate Spider-Man #1 by Brian Michael Bendis and Mark Bagley. Ultimate X-Men premieres a few months later.
- Garth Ennis begins working for Marvel Comics and writes The Punisher under the Marvel Knights imprint along with artist Steve Dillon. This begins a trend of hiring outsiders from other comic book companies throughout the decade.
- Sentry begins publication with writer Paul Jenkins and artist Jae Lee, introducing the Sentry.

=== 2001 ===
- X-Men is renamed New X-Men when it is taken over by writer Grant Morrison and artist Frank Quitely with issue #114. The series bring a new aesthetic to the X-Men, such as replacing the heroes' spandex costumes.
- Alias #1 is released by Brian Michael Bendis as the first publication of the MAX imprint.
- The Amazing Spider-Man #36 by J. Michael Straczynski and John Romita Jr. and the standalone publication Heroes are released as tributes following the September 11 attacks.

=== 2002 ===
- Marvel Comics stops using the Comics Code Authority in favor of its own rating system.
- Marvel releases A Moment of Silence as a tribute to first responders of the September 11 attacks.
- The Ultimate Universe is expanded with the release of The Ultimates, its version of the The Avengers.
- A new Captain America series is created by John Ney Rieber and John Cassaday in which Captain America fights Islamists as a response to the September 11 attacks.

=== 2003 ===
- Runaways begins publications, introducing the Runaways.
- NYX #1 introduces X-23, adapting the character from the animated television series X-Men: Evolution.
- Neil Gaiman creates the Marvel 1602 continuity with the release of 1602.

=== 2004 ===
- The Avengers Disassembled crossover is published, written by Brian Michael Bendis and drawn by David Finch. This introduces a tonal shift overseen by Bendis that persists throughout Marvel's stories over the following years as a response to the political climate during the war on terror.
- The Secret War miniseries is published.
- Joss Whedon becomes the writer for The Astonishing X-Men with artist John Cassaday, returning the X-Men characters to their more traditional appearances.

=== 2005 ===
- Writer Warren Ellis and artist Adi Granov create Iron Man's "Extremis" storyline.
- The Avengers and X-Men storyline "House of M" is published. It reinvents Carol Danvers (previously Ms. Marvel and Binary) as Captain Marvel. In the aftermath of "House of M", most mutants lose their powers due to the Scarlet Witch's actions.

=== 2006 ===
- The Civil War crossover begins, written as an allegory for the Patriot Act.
- A redesign of Spider-Man is introduced when he takes the Iron Spider armor, created for him by Iron Man.
- Black Panther features the wedding of Black Panther and Storm.

=== 2007 ===
- The Death of Captain America sees Captain America killed.
- World War Hulk depicts Hulk's return to Earth.
- A new Thor series premieres three years after the previous series concluded.

=== 2008 ===
- The film Iron Man is released, beginning the Marvel Cinematic Universe.
- The Secret Invasion event is written by Bendis and drawn by Leinil Francis Yu. Continuing Bendis's theme of 2000s politics, it portrays the Skrulls as infiltrators who can blend in with the public. It is immediately followed by "Dark Reign", in which Norman Osborn becomes the government authority over superheroes.
- Following The Death of Captain America, Bucky Barnes is introduced as the new, less virtuous Captain America.
- "One More Day" resets Spider-Man's continuity when the character makes a deal with the demon Mephisto.
- Annihilation: Conquest is published as a sequel to Annihilation.

=== 2009 ===
- The Walt Disney Company purchases Marvel Comics.
- Jonathan Hickman begins his four-year run on Fantastic Four.

== 2010s ==
=== 2010 ===
- Bendis writes the Siege event, in which Norman Osborn leads the United States into war with Asgard. This marks the final story arc of Bendis's war on terror allegories.
- Steve Rogers, the former Captain America, takes the name Super Soldier and becomes the head of S.H.I.E.L.D.
- Dan Slott becomes the primary writer for all Spider-Man stories, beginning an acclaimed eight-year run.

=== 2011 ===
- Axel Alonso becomes editor-in-chief of Marvel Comics.
- Joe Madureira returns to Marvel Comics and begins working on Avenging Spider-Man.
- The "Fear Itself" event restores Captain America, Iron Man, and Thor to their status quo.
- The Mighty Thor returns to publication with a new volume.
- Jonathan Hickman and Steve Epting reinvent the Fantastic Four as the Future Foundation in FF #1, replacing the Human Torch with Spider-Man.
- Vengeance #1 introduces America Chavez.
- Mark Waid becomes the writer for Daredevil and begins a celebrated run for the series.
- Ultimate Fallout #4 sees Miles Morales become the new Spider-Man.
- X-Men: Schism is written by Jason Aaron.

=== 2012 ===
- The Avengers vs. X-Men event is published.
- Marvel initiates a soft relaunch of its publications under the Marvel Now! branding. Each series restarts at issue #1 with new writers.
- Marvel Comics depicts a gay wedding between Northstar and his love interest Kyle Jinadu, the first such event in a mainstream comic book.

=== 2013 ===
- All-New X-Men is created by Brian Michael Bendis and Stuart Immonen reintroduces the original 1960s cast of the X-Men as time travelers to the present day alongside their older selves.
- The "Age of Ultron" event is published.

=== 2014 ===
- Kamala Khan, a Pakistani–American Muslim character, is created by Sana Amanat and G. Willow Wilson.
- The "Spider-Verse" event begins. Edge of Spider-Verse #2 introduces Spider-Gwen.
- The character Robbie Reyes becomes the new Ghost Rider.
- Peter David resumes his work on Spider-Man 2099 with a new series.
- The character of Captain America is replaced by Sam Wilson, formerly the Falcon.
- "Death of Wolverine" is published.

=== 2015 ===
- A new Secret Wars begins. It is created to integrate the Ultimate Marvel imprint into the primary continuity.
- The character of Wolverine is replaced by X-23.
- Marvel begins publishing Star Wars comic books. The first issue of Star Wars, written by Jason Aaron and drawn by John Cassaday, is the most successful issue of a comic book in two decades. Star Wars: Leia and Star Wars: Darth Vader are published shortly after.
- A new series of Doctor Strange is created by Jason Aaron and Chris Bachalo.

=== 2016 ===
- Bendis writes Civil War II as an allegory about profiling. Its plot is unrelated to the previous Civil War storyline, and it is Bendis's last crossover event before leaving Marvel Comics.
- Writer Tom King and artist Gabriel Hernández Walta create the standalone series Vision in which Vision starts a family.
- The Ultimate Marvel imprint ends after 16 years.
- The Totally Awesome Hulk #1 introduces Amadeus Cho as the new Hulk, written by Greg Pak and drawn by Frank Cho.
- The "Avengers: Standoff!" event is published.

=== 2017 ===
- C. B. Cebulski becomes editor-in-chief of Marvel Comics.
- Nick Spencer writes the Secret Empire event, using the villain Red Skull to invoke the alt-right. The event prompted controversy by having the traditional Captain America, Steve Rogers, act as a member of the Nazi-inspired organization Hydra after the timeline is rewritten.
- An ongoing Old Man Logan series begins publication for the alternate universe version of Wolverine.
- The Generations anthology series is published.
- America begins publication as a standalone series for America Chavez.

=== 2018 ===
- Stan Lee dies on November 12, 2018.
- Rise of the Black Panther begins publication, written by Ta-Nehisi Coates and drawn by Brian Stelfreeze.
- The Fantastic Four return to Marvel's continuity after the fallout of Secret Wars.
- The Immortal Hulk, a horror series featuring the Hulk, is created by Al Ewing and Joe Bennett.
- The "Infinity Wars" event is published.
- Wolverine returns after two years in the Return of Wolverine series.

=== 2019 ===
- Jason Aaron creates "The War of the Realms" event.
- Jonathan Hickman begins his run on X-Men comics, writing House of X and Powers of X. The twin series saw Krakoa, a living island who previously fought the X-Men, established as a mutant nation. In addition, the X-Men established a means of resurrection using the Five, a group of mutants who combine their powers to recreate the bodies of mutants as they were when they died. This process led to many long-deceased characters being resurrected.
- Mark Waid and Javier Rodríguez create History of the Marvel Universe.

=== 2023 ===
- The Ultimate Universe imprint is announced. Inspired by the original Ultimate Marvel universe, the Ultimate Universe is set in a separate universe whose history was influenced by the Maker, the Ultimate Marvel counterpart of Mister Fantastic.

=== 2024 ===
- The Krakoan Age ends with the miniseries Fall of the House of X and Rise of the Powers of X, followed by X-Men #35 (issue #700 overall). Krakoa relocates to the extradimensional White Hot Room for its own safety, leaving the Five and many other mutants unable to return to Earth.
- The X-Men franchise is relaunched with "X-Men: From the Ashes", which sees the X-Men split into three primary groups following the fall of Krakoa.

== See also ==
- List of Marvel Comics people
