= Hansi (disambiguation) =

Hansi is a city in the Indian state of Haryana. Hansi may also refer to:

- Hansi (Vidhan Sabha constituency)

== People ==
- Hansi Arnstaedt (1878–1945), German actress
- Hansi Flick (born 1965), German football coach, former player and manager of the Germany national team
- Hansi Knoteck (1914–2014), actress
- Hansi Kürsch (born 1966), German lead vocalist of power metal band Blind Guardian
- Hansi Müller (born 1957), German former footballer
- Hansi Wendler (1912–2010), German actress
- "Oncle Hansi" or "Hansi", a pseudonym for Jean-Jacques Waltz, a French artist of Alsatian origin
- James Last (1929–2015), German composer and big band leader also known as "Hansi"

== Other uses ==
- Hansi, Estonia, a village
- Hansi, the Girl who Loved the Swastika, an autobiographical book by Maria Anne Hirschmann
- Hansi, a subcaste of the Chuhra Dalit caste

== See also ==
- Hansi hoard
