= Flying Dutchman =

Legendary ghost ship

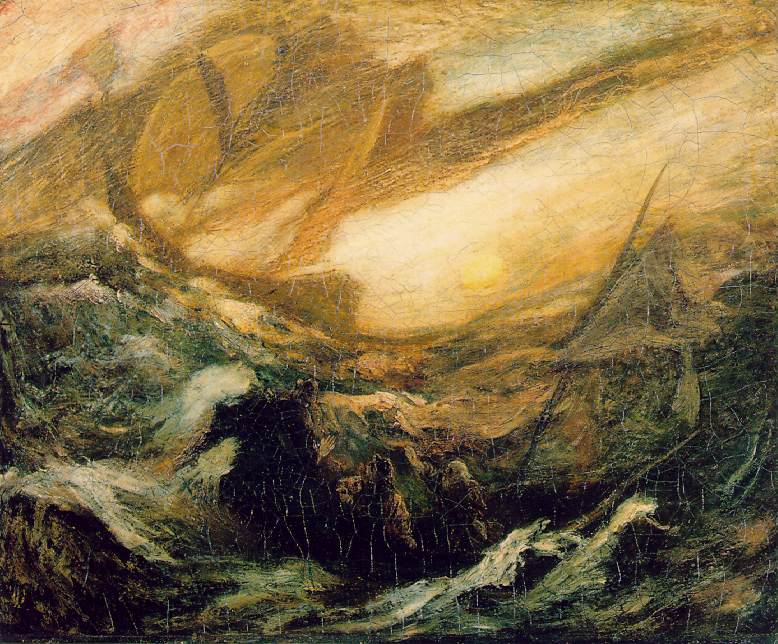
- The Flying Dutchman by Albert Pinkham Ryder c. 1887
- Captain: Willem van der Decken

The Flying Dutchman (Dutch: De Vliegende Hollander, Afrikaans: Die Vlieënde Hollander) is a legendary ghost ship, allegedly never able to make port and doomed to sail the sea forever. The myths and ghost stories are likely to have originated from the 17th-century Golden Age of the Dutch East India Company (VOC) and of Dutch maritime power. The oldest known extant version of the legend dates from the late 18th century. According to the legend, if hailed by another ship, the crew of the Flying Dutchman might try to send messages to land, or to people long dead. Reported sightings in the 19th and 20th centuries claimed that the ship glowed with a ghostly light. In ocean lore, the sight of this phantom ship functions as a portent of doom. It was commonly believed that the Flying Dutchman was a 17th-century cargo vessel known as a fluyt.

== Origins ==
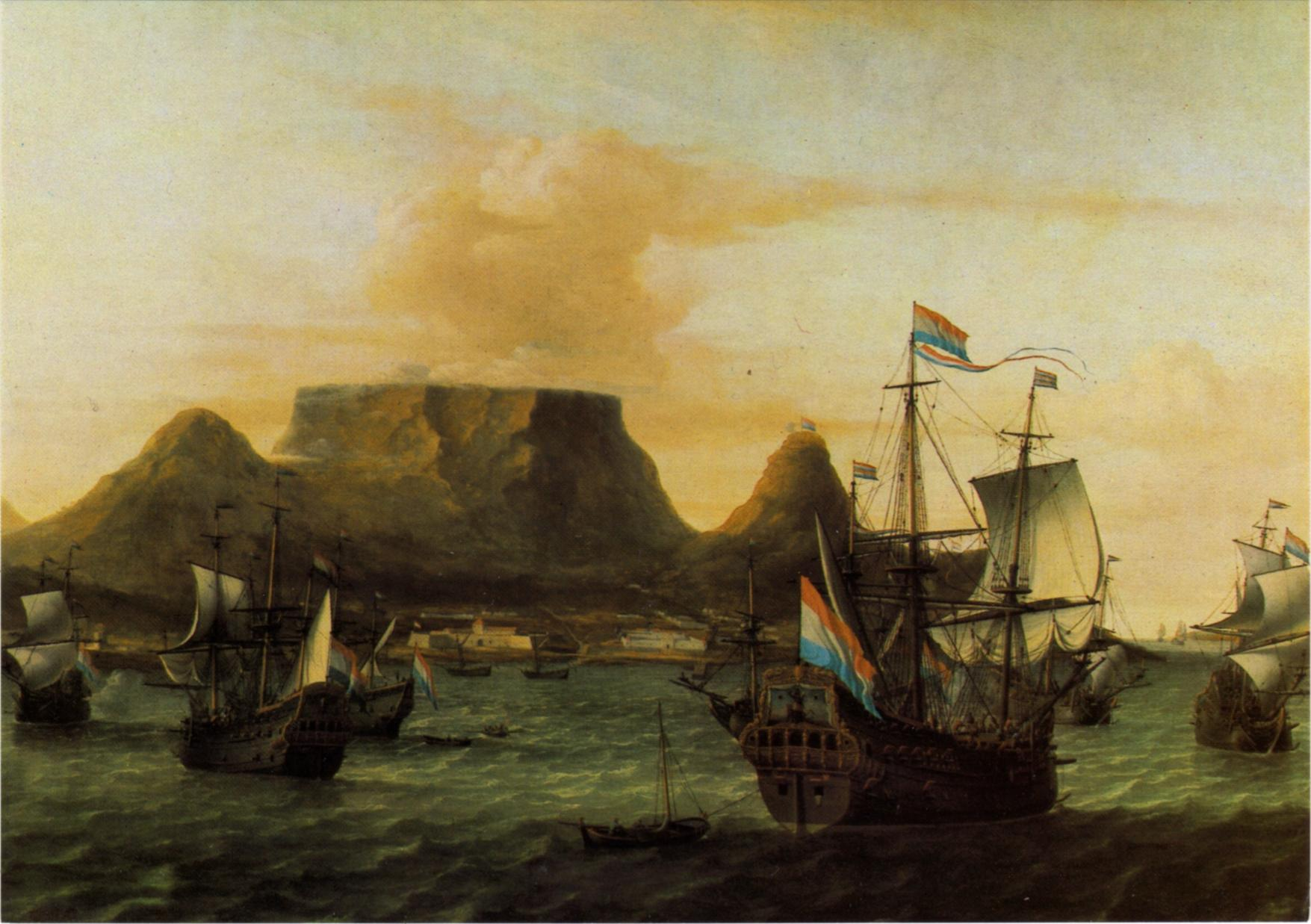
View of Table Bay (overlooked by Kaapstad, Dutch Cape Colony) with ships of the Dutch East India Company, c. 1683.

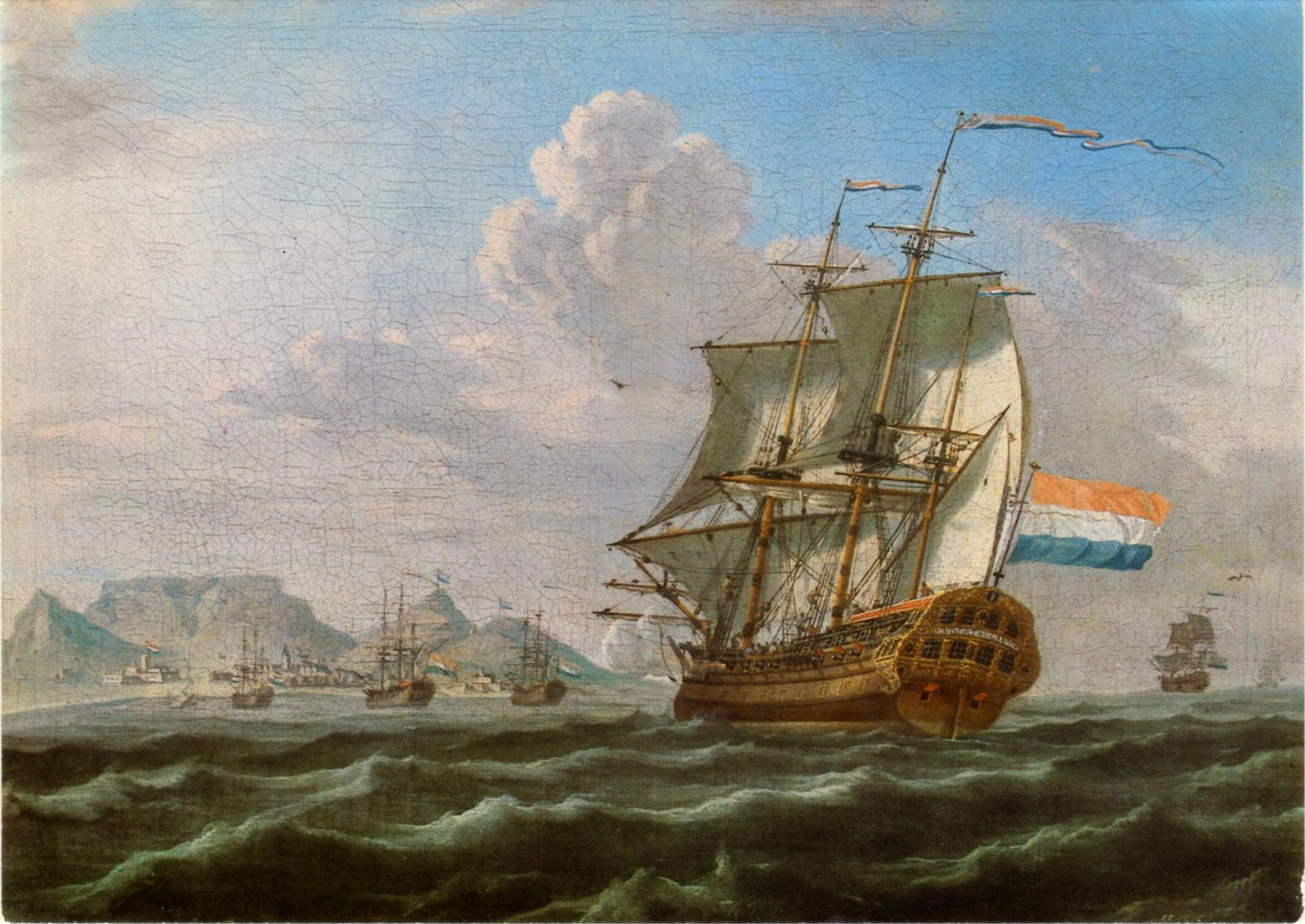
An 18th-century painting of a VOC ship with Table Mountain in the background

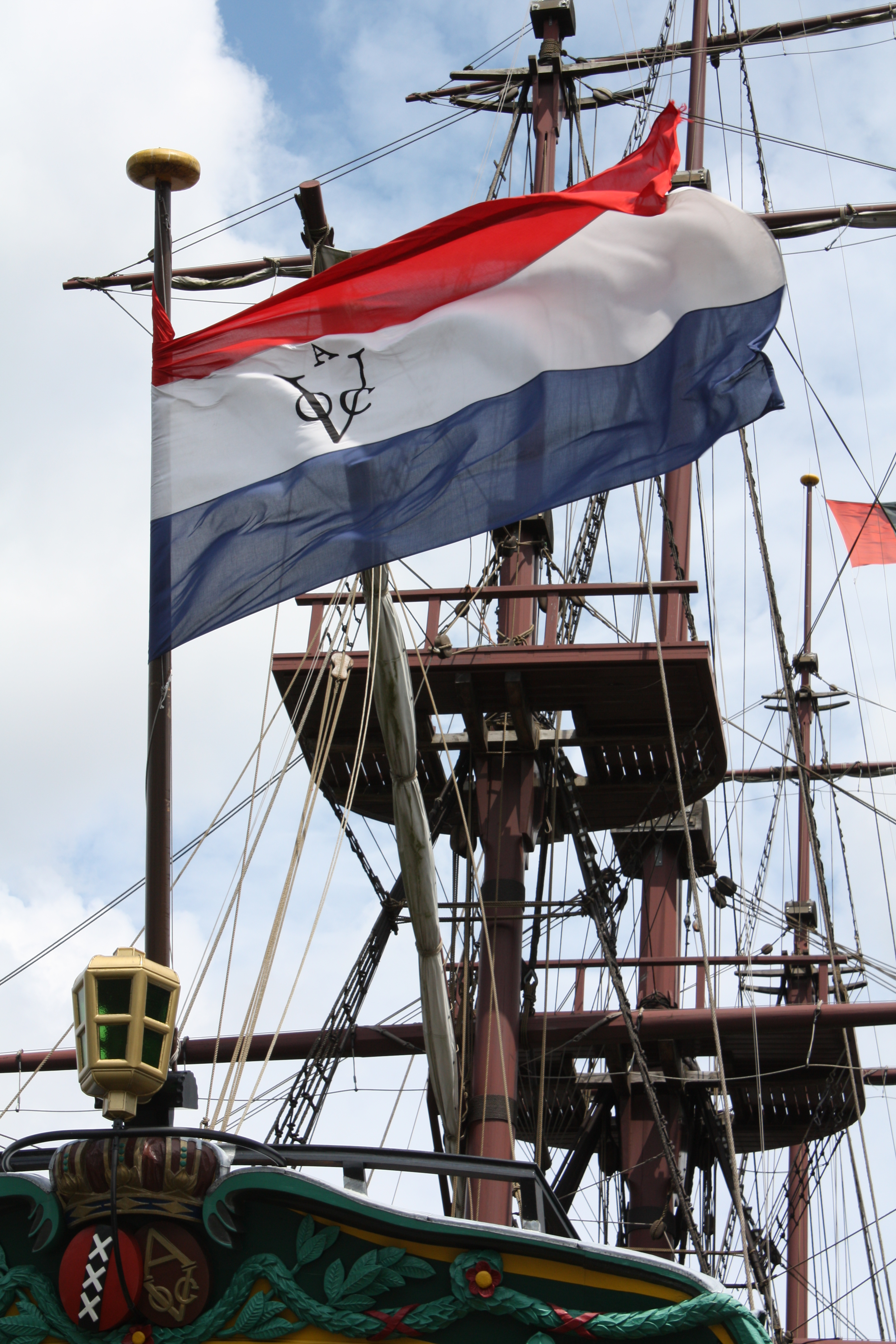
Replica of an East Indiaman of the Dutch East India Company/United East Indies Company (VOC). The legend of the Flying Dutchman is likely to have originated from the 17th-century golden age of the VOC.

The first known print reference to the ship appears in Travels in various part of Europe, Asia and Africa during a series of thirty years and upward (1790) by John MacDonald:

The weather was so stormy that the sailors said they saw the Flying Dutchman. The common story is that this Dutchman came to the Cape in distress of weather and wanted to get into harbour but could not get a pilot to conduct her and was lost and that ever since in very bad weather her vision appears.

The next literary reference appears in Chapter VI of A Voyage to Botany Bay (1795) (also known as A Voyage to New South Wales), attributed to George Barrington (1755–1804): (Note: George Barrington (originally Waldron) was tried at the Old Bailey in London in September 1790 for picking pockets and sentenced to transportation for seven years. He embarked on the convict transport Active which sailed from Portsmouth on 27 March 1791 and arrived at Port Jackson (Sydney), just to the north of Botany Bay, on 26 September, having anchored briefly at Table Bay in very late June. The various accounts of his voyage and activities in New South Wales appear to be literary forgeries by publishers capitalizing both on his notoriety and in public interest for the new colony, combining turns of phrase from his trial speeches with plagiarized genuine accounts of other writers concerning Botany Bay. See George Barrington's Voyage to Botany Bay edited by Suzanne Rickard (Leicester University Press, 2001). A Voyage to Botany Bay and A Voyage to New South Wales, both issued in 1795, were revamped versions of An Impartial and Circumstantial Narrative of the Present State of Botany Bay, which had appeared in 1793–94, but which did not include the Flying Dutchman reference.)

I had often heard of the superstition of sailors respecting apparitions and doom, but had never given much credit to the report; it seems that some years since a Dutch man-of-war was lost off the Cape of Good Hope, and every soul on board perished; her consort weathered the gale, and arrived soon after at the Cape. Having refitted, and returning to Europe, they were assailed by a violent tempest nearly in the same latitude. In the night watch some of the people saw, or imagined they saw, a vessel standing for them under a press of sail, as though she would run them down: one in particular affirmed it was the ship that had foundered in the former gale, and that it must certainly be her, or the apparition of her; but on its clearing up, the object, a dark thick cloud, disappeared. Nothing could do away the idea of this phenomenon on the minds of the sailors; and, on their relating the circumstances when they arrived in port, the story spread like wild-fire, and the supposed phantom was called the Flying Dutchman. From the Dutch the English seamen got the infatuation, and there are very few Indiamen, but what has some one on board, who pretends to have seen the apparition.

The next literary reference introduces the motif of punishment for a crime, in Scenes of Infancy (Edinburgh, 1803) by John Leyden (1775–1811):

It is a common superstition of mariners, that, in the high southern latitudes on the coast of Africa, hurricanes are frequently ushered in by the appearance of a spectre-ship, denominated the Flying Dutchman ... The crew of this vessel are supposed to have been guilty of some dreadful crime, in the infancy of navigation; and to have been stricken with pestilence ... and are ordained still to traverse the ocean on which they perished, till the period of their penance expire. (Note: Leyden says that Chaucer, echoing Dante's account of the Second Circle of Hell in his Inferno, alludes to a punishment of a similar kind in his poem The Parlement of Foules: "And breakers of the laws, sooth to sain, / And lecherous folk, after that they been dead, / Shall whirl about the world alway in pain, / Till many a world be passed out of dread.")

Thomas Moore (1779–1852) places the vessel in the north Atlantic in his poem Written on passing Dead-man's Island in the Gulf of St. Lawrence, Late in the evening, September 1804: "Fast gliding along, a gloomy bark / Her sails are full, though the wind is still, / And there blows not a breath her sails to fill." A footnote adds: "The above lines were suggested by a superstition very common among sailors, who call this ghost-ship, I think, 'the flying Dutch-man'."

Sir Walter Scott (1771–1832), a friend of John Leyden's, was the first to refer to the vessel as a pirate ship, writing in the notes to Rokeby (first published December 1812) that the ship was "originally a vessel loaded with great wealth, on board of which some horrid act of murder and piracy had been committed" and that the apparition of the ship "is considered by the mariners as the worst of all possible omens". Scott notes that Leyden shared a similar legend, but that Leyden had named their crime not as piracy, but as being the first ship to bring enslaved people from Africa.

According to some sources, 17th-century Dutch captain Bernard Fokke is the model for the captain of the ghost ship. Fokke was renowned for the speed of his trips from the Netherlands to Java and was suspected of being in league with the Devil. The first version of the legend as a story was printed in Blackwood's Edinburgh Magazine for May 1821, which puts the scene as the Cape of Good Hope. This story names the Dutchman’s captain as Hendrick van der Decken and introduces the motifs (elaborated by later writers) of letters addressed to people long dead being offered to other ships for delivery, but if accepted will bring misfortune; and the captain having sworn to round the Cape of Good Hope though it should take until the day of judgment.

She was an Amsterdam vessel and sailed from port seventy years ago. Her master's name was Van der Decken. He was a staunch seaman, and would have his own way in spite of the devil. For all that, never a sailor under him had reason to complain; though how it is on board with them nobody knows. The story is this: that in doubling the Cape they were a long day trying to weather the Table Bay. However, the wind headed them, and went against them more and more, and Van der Decken walked the deck, swearing at the wind. Just after sunset a vessel spoke him, asking him if he did not mean to go into the bay that night. Van der Decken replied: "May I be eternally damned if I do, though I should beat about here till the day of judgment." And to be sure, he never did go into that bay, for it is believed that he continues to beat about in these seas still, and will do so long enough. This vessel is never seen but with foul weather along with her.

== Reported sightings ==
There have been many reported or alleged sightings in the 19th and 20th centuries. A well-known sighting was by Prince George of Wales, the future King George V. He was on a three-year voyage during his late adolescence in 1880 with his elder brother Prince Albert Victor of Wales and their tutor John Neill Dalton. They temporarily shipped into HMS Inconstant after the damaged rudder was repaired in their original ship, the 4,000-tonne corvette HMS Bacchante. The prince's log (indeterminate as to which prince, due to later editing before publication) records the following for the pre-dawn hours of 11 July 1881, off the coast of Australia:

July 11th. At 4 a.m. the Flying Dutchman crossed our bows. A strange red light as of a phantom ship all aglow, in the midst of which light the masts, spars and sails of a brig 200 yards distant stood out in strong relief as she came up on the port bow, where also the officer of the watch from the bridge clearly saw her, as did the quarterdeck midshipman, who was sent forward at once to the forecastle; but on arriving there was no vestige nor any sign whatever of any material ship was to be seen either near or right away to the horizon, the night being clear and the sea calm. Thirteen persons altogether saw her ... At 10.45 a.m. the ordinary seaman who had this morning reported the Flying Dutchman fell from the foretopmast crosstrees on to the topgallant forecastle and was smashed to atoms.

Nicholas Monsarrat, the novelist who wrote The Cruel Sea, described the phenomenon in the Pacific Ocean in his unfinished final book "Master Mariner", which was partly inspired by this tale (he lived and worked in South Africa after the war) and the story of the Wandering Jew.

== Explanations as an optical illusion ==
Probably the most credible explanation is a superior mirage or Fata Morgana seen at sea:

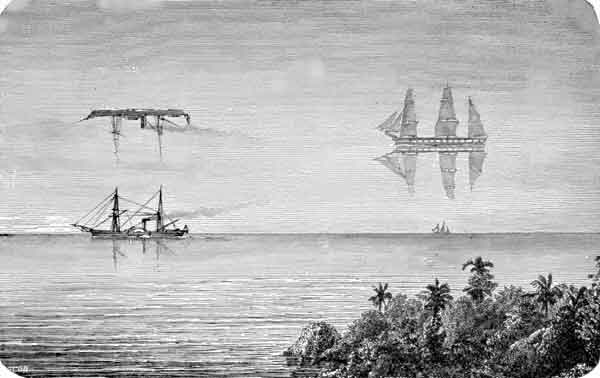
Book illustration showing superior mirages of two boats

The news soon spread through the vessel that a phantom-ship with a ghostly crew was sailing in the air over a phantom-ocean, and that it was a bad omen, and meant that not one of them should ever see land again. The captain was told the wonderful tale, and coming on deck, he explained to the sailors that this strange appearance was caused by the reflection of some ship that was sailing on the water below this image, but at such a distance they could not see it. There were certain conditions of the atmosphere, he said, when the sun's rays could form a perfect picture in the air of objects on the earth, like the images one sees in glass or water, but they were not generally upright, as in the case of this ship, but reversed—turned bottom upwards. This appearance in the air is called a mirage. He told a sailor to go up to the foretop and look beyond the phantom-ship. The man obeyed, and reported that he could see on the water, below the ship in the air, one precisely like it. Just then another ship was seen in the air, only this one was a steamship, and was bottom-upwards, as the captain had said these mirages generally appeared. Soon after, the steamship itself came in sight. The sailors were now convinced, and never afterwards believed in phantom-ships.

Another optical effect known as looming occurs when rays of light are bent across different refractive indices. This could make a ship just off the horizon appear hoisted in the air.

== Adaptations ==
=== In literature ===
The 1797–98 poem by Samuel Taylor Coleridge, The Rime of the Ancient Mariner, contains a similar account of a ghost ship, which may have been influenced by the tale of the Flying Dutchman.

One of the first Flying Dutchman short stories was titled Vanderdecken's Message Home; or, the Tenacity of Natural Affection and was published in Blackwood's during 1821.

John Boyle O'Reilly wrote a poem titled The Flying Dutchman (1867). It was first published in The Wild Goose, a handwritten newspaper produced by Fenian convicts being transported to Western Australia.

Dutch poet J. Slauerhoff published a number of related poems, particularly in his 1928 volume Eldorado.

Ward Moore's 1951 story Flying Dutchman used the myth as a metaphor for an automated bomber which continues to fly over an Earth where humanity long since totally destroyed itself and all life in a nuclear war.

The second part of Larry Niven's science fiction novel Protector is titled Vandervecken [sic] and draws parallels between a major character and the Flying Dutchman.

British author Brian Jacques wrote a trilogy of fantasy/young adult novels concerning two reluctant members of the Dutchman's crew, a young boy and his dog, whom an angel charges to help those in need. The first novel was titled Castaways of the Flying Dutchman (2001); the second was titled The Angel's Command (2003), and the third was titled Voyage of Slaves (2006).

The comic fantasy Flying Dutch by Tom Holt is a version of the Flying Dutchman story. In this version, the Dutchman is not a ghost ship but crewed by immortals who can only visit land once every seven years when the unbearable smell that is a side-effect of the elixir of life wears off.

=== In opera and theatre ===
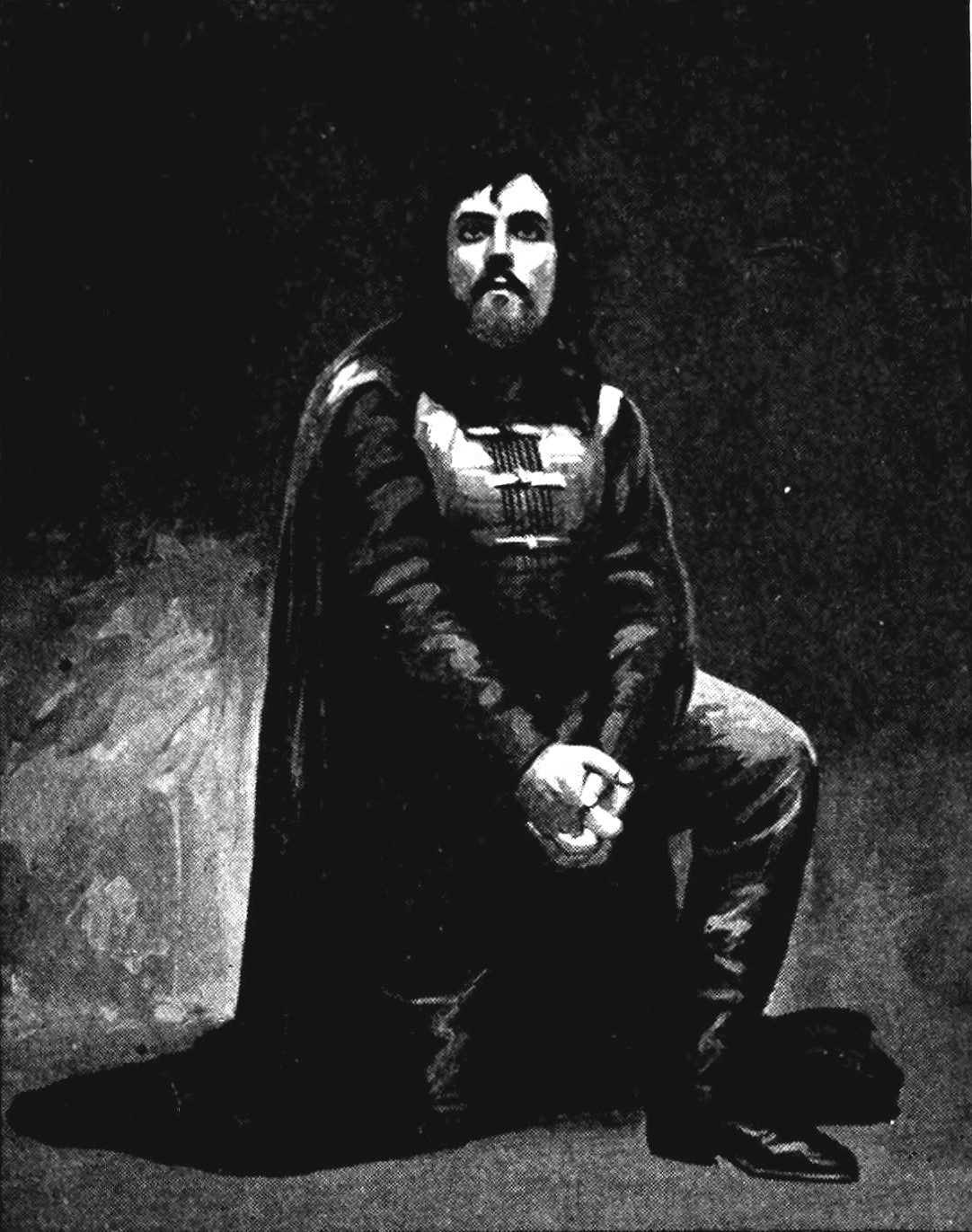
Depiction of Richard Wagner's Opera Der fliegende Holländer

The story was adapted into the English melodrama The Flying Dutchman; or the Phantom Ship: al Drama, in three acts (1826) by Edward Fitzball, with music by George Rodwell. The 48-page text, published c. 1829, acknowledges the Blackwood’s Magazine as the source.

Richard Wagner's opera The Flying Dutchman (1843) is adapted from an episode in Heinrich Heine's satirical novel The Memoirs of Mister von Schnabelewopski (Aus den Memoiren des Herrn von Schnabelewopski) (1833), in which a character attends a theatrical performance of The Flying Dutchman in Amsterdam. Heine had first used the legend in his Reisebilder: Die Nordsee (Pictures of Travel: the North Sea) (1826), which simply repeats from Blackwood's Magazine the features of the vessel being seen in a storm and sending letters addressed to persons long since dead. In his 1833 elaboration, Heine introduced the chance of salvation through a woman's devotion and the opportunity to set foot on land every seven years to seek a faithful wife. It was once thought that Heine may have based the episode on Fitzball's play, which was playing at the Adelphi Theatre in London, but the run had ended on 7 April 1827 and Heine did not arrive in London until the 14th; it was not published until its revival in 1829. Unlike Fitzball's play, which is set off the Cape of Good Hope, Heine's account is set in the North Sea off Scotland. Wagner's opera was similarly planned to take place off the coast of Scotland, although during the final rehearsals he transferred the action to another part of the North Sea, off Norway.

Pierre-Louis Dietsch composed an opera Le vaisseau fantôme, ou Le maudit des mers (The Phantom Ship, or The Accursed of the Sea), which was first performed on 9 November 1842 at the Paris Opera. The libretto by Paul Foucher and H. Révoil was based on Walter Scott's The Pirate as well as Frederick Marryat's novel The Phantom Ship and other sources, although Wagner thought it was based on the scenario of his own opera, which he had just sold to the Opera. The similarity of Dietsch's opera to Wagner's is slight, although Wagner's assertion is often repeated. Berlioz thought Le vaisseau fantôme too solemn, but other reviewers were more favourable.

Dutchman (1964), a short play by Amiri Baraka, uses the legend as a symbol of entrapment.

=== In art and design ===
The Flying Dutchman has been captured in paintings by Albert Ryder, now in the Smithsonian American Art Museum, and by Howard Pyle, whose painting of the Flying Dutchman is on exhibit at the Delaware Art Museum.

=== In television ===
In "The Buccaneers" 1956, episode 22 of Season 1 features a ghost ship known as The Dutchman. Ultimately, it is found that a crew of pirates had taken the ship after the previous captain was hanged and used it in lucrative business, drawing other ships in, stealing their cargo, then scuttling them, all while haunting the crews. This is ultimately thwarted by Dan Tempest and crew, when they attempt to take the ship to harbor.

In "Judgment Night", a 1959 episode of Rod Serling's The Twilight Zone, the U-boat captain who sank an Allied passenger ship in World War II finds himself doomed to forever relive the experience as a "Flying Dutchman" passenger of the torpedoed ship. Two other Twilight Zone episodes, "The Arrival" and "Death Ship" also refer to the legend. The Flying Dutchman was also featured in "Cave of the Dead", a 1967 episode of Voyage to the Bottom of the Sea.

In the 1967 Spider-Man cartoon "Return of the Flying Dutchman", the ship appears as an illusion created by Mysterio.

In the 1976 Land of the Lost episode "Flying Dutchman", the ship appears captained by Ruben Van de Meer, who attempts to take Holly with him to give him company on his endless voyage.

A ghostly pirate known as the Flying Dutchman appears as a recurring character in the animated television series SpongeBob SquarePants.

In the anime/manga series One Piece, the Flying Dutchman is an undersea pirate ship captained by Vander Decken and his descendants over the course of generations and has maintained a reputation as a ghost ship accordingly through its damaged appearance.

=== In comics ===
Carl Barks wrote and drew a 1959 comic book story where Uncle Scrooge, Donald Duck and Huey, Dewey, and Louie meet The Flying Dutchman. Barks ultimately explains the "flying" ship as an optical illusion.

Journey Into Mystery #56 (cover date January 1960) includes the story "I Spent a Night in the Haunted Lighthouse" (Author unknown; drawn by Joe Sinnott), in which a tourist stranded in an abandoned lighthouse during a nighttime storm sees a ghostly ship and pirates. The following day, he finds a life preserver from The Flying Dutchman.

Silver Surfer #8–9 (cover date September/October 1969), art by John Buscema and Dan Adkins, with dialogue and editing by Stan Lee, features a retelling of The Flying Dutchman legend. Here, it is the captain of the doomed ship (named Joost van Straaten) who gets the "Flying Dutchman" name, rather than his boat.

=== In film ===
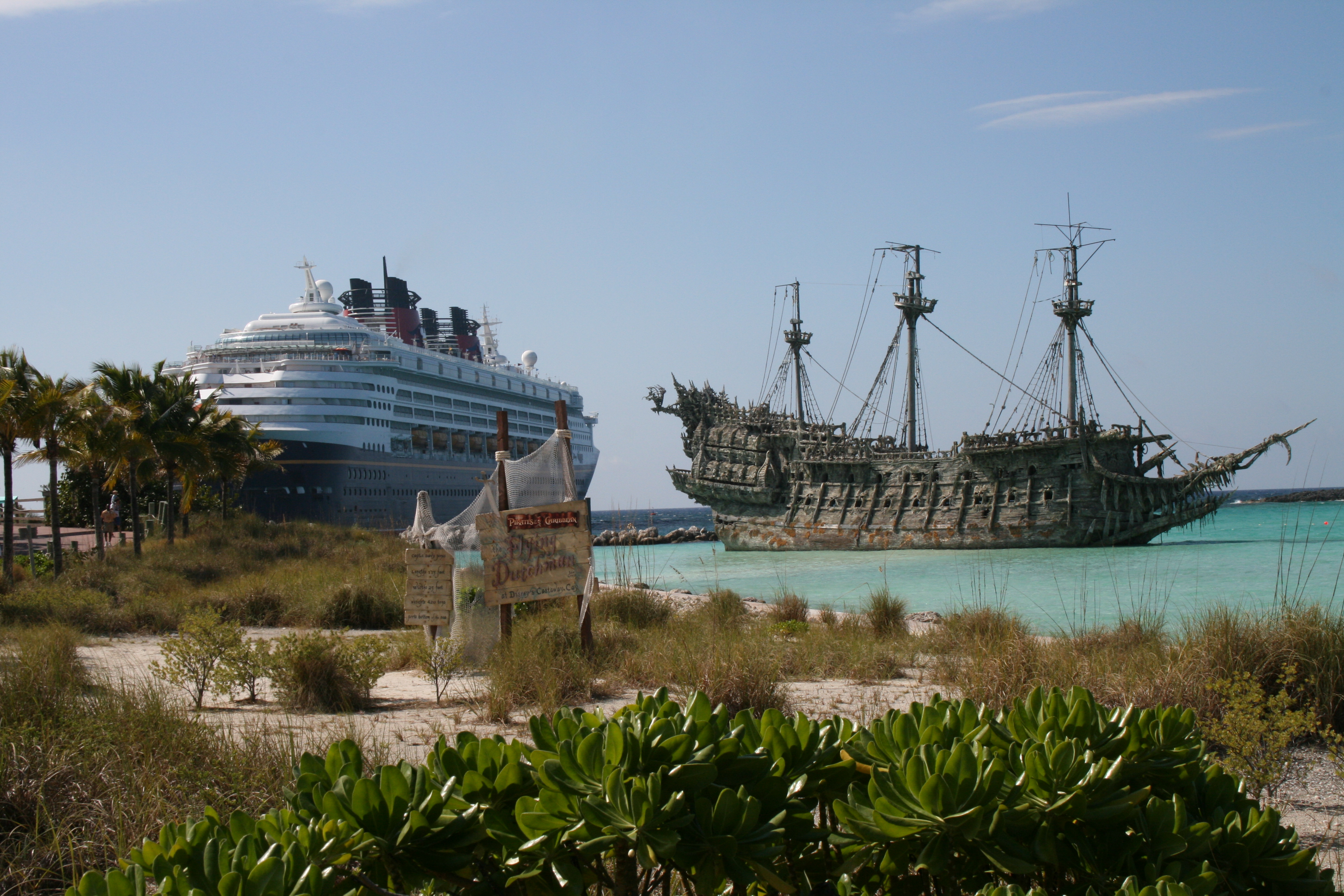
Disney's Flying Dutchman prop used in Pirates of the Caribbean moored at Castaway Cay cruise ship terminal

The story was dramatised in the 1951 film Pandora and the Flying Dutchman, starring James Mason and Ava Gardner. In this version, the Flying Dutchman is a man, not a ship, and the main action takes place on the Mediterranean coast of Spain during the summer of 1930. Centuries earlier, the Dutchman had killed his wife, wrongly believing her to be unfaithful. At his trial, he was unrepentant and cursed God. Providence condemned him to roam the seas until he found the true meaning of love. In the only plot point taken from earlier versions of the story, once every seven years, the Dutchman is allowed ashore for six months to search for a woman who will love him enough to die for him, releasing him from his curse, and he finds her in Pandora, played by Gardner.

The Pirates of the Caribbean franchise features a ship named the Flying Dutchman, which first appeared in Pirates of the Caribbean: Dead Man's Chest (2006) and Pirates of the Caribbean: At World's End (2007), captained by Davy Jones. In a story partly inspired by Richard Wagner's opera, Davy Jones can step on land once every ten years. The Flying Dutchman also made appearances in the video games Disney Infinity, Kingdom Hearts III, and Sea of Thieves.

=== In music ===
In 1949, RCA Victor, inventors of the single 45 RPM format, released as one of their first singles a recording of the legend in song in bandleader Hugo Winterhalter's "The Flying Dutchman", sung as a sea shanty.

Dutch symphonic black metal band Carach Angren wrote a concept album about the Flying Dutchman entitled Death Came Through a Phantom Ship.

Tin Machine, fronted by David Bowie, mentions it in their song "Amlapura" on the Tin Machine II (1991) album.

"The Flying Dutchman" is a song by the pirate-themed music group The Jolly Rogers. Its lyrics narrate the encounter of a ship crew with the titular ghost ship.

"Flying Dutchman" is a B-side from Tori Amos's 1992 debut album Little Earthquakes.

"Flying Dutchman" is a track on Jethro Tull's 1979 twelfth studio album Stormwatch.

"Flying Dutchman" is a track on Bleood's 2026 debut studio album Kill Your Idols

=== In radio drama ===
The story was adapted by Judith French into a play, The Dutch Mariner, broadcast on BBC Radio 4 on 13 April 2003.

=== In leisure ===
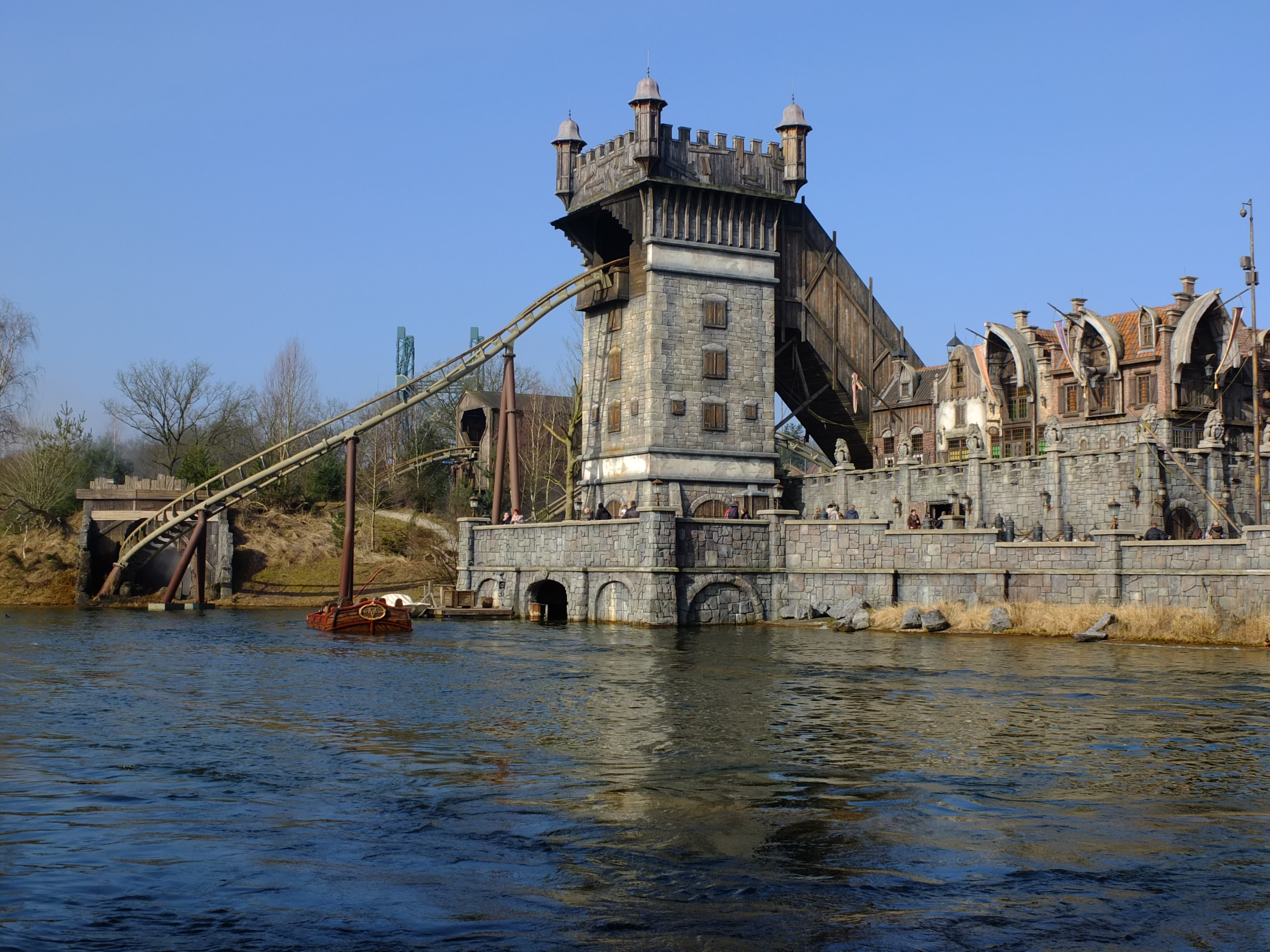
Flying Dutchman rollercoaster at Efteling amusement park

The Efteling amusement park in the Netherlands has a roller coaster called De Vliegende Hollander ("The Flying Dutchman" in English), which features a captain named Willem van der Decken (nl).

=== In aviation ===
KLM Royal Dutch Airlines references the endless traveling aspect of the story by having The Flying Dutchman painted on the rear sides of all its aircraft with regular livery.

=== In sailing ===
There is a design of 20-foot, one-design, high-performance, two-person racing dinghy named the Flying Dutchman. It made its Olympic debut at the 1960 Summer Games competitions in the Gulf of Naples and is still one of the fastest racing dinghies in the world.

=== People ===
Several people have been nicknamed the "Flying Dutchman", including Anthony Fokker. Dutch football player Dennis Bergkamp was nicknamed "the Non-Flying Dutchman", because of his fear of flying. American baseball player Johannes Peter "Honus" Wagner was nicknamed the Flying Dutchman because of his speed and German heritage. Famous Dutch football player Robin van Persie also got the nickname "the Flying Dutchman" after his goal against Spain in the 2014 World Cup because of the way he scored with the header. In the 1970s, the British and American press often dubbed the Dutch rock band Golden Earring "The Flying Dutchmen" because of their exuberant stage act, which included drummer Cesar Zuiderwijk leaping over his drum kit and guitarist George Kooymans performing high jumps. More recently, Dutch Formula 1 driver Max Verstappen is sometimes called "the Flying Dutchman".

=== Horse racing ===
The 13th Earl of Eglinton owned a racehorse named The Flying Dutchman.

== See also ==
- 90377 Sedna – nicknamed the Flying Dutchman
- Caleuche
- Chasse-galerie
- Davy Jones's locker
- De Vliegende Hollander
- Mary Celeste
- Peter Rugg
- Wandering Jew
- Wild Hunt
- List of ghosts

== Bibliography ==
- Barrington, George (2004) [1795], Voyage to Botany Bay, Sydney University Press, ISBN 1-920897-20-8
- Meyer-Arendt, Jurgen (1995) [1972], Introduction to Modern and Classical Optics, Prentice-Hall, Inc., ISBN 0-13-124356-X
