= Maria Anne Hirschmann =

Czechoslovak-American author and evangelist (born 1926)

- Born: 1926; Sudetenland, Czechoslovakia
- Citizenship: Czechoslovakia (until 1938); Third Reich (1938–1945); Stateless (1945–1949); West Germany (1949–1955); United States (since 1955)
- Occupations: Author; evangelist; speaker
- Spouse: Rudy Hirschmann (m. 1950, died 2014)
- Children: 5

Maria Anne Hirschmann (born c. 1926) is a Czechoslovak-American author and public speaker on Christian subjects.

Hirschmann was caught in the events of World War II when the Nazis invaded Czechoslovakia and the local Sudeten German population came under the influence of Nazism. During this time, she was sent to Prague and educated to be a local leader of the Nazi Youth. When the Soviets came, she was imprisoned by Russian and Czech communists in a labor camp. Eventually, she managed to escape to American-occupied Germany. In 1955 she emigrated to America as a teacher and wrote a book about her life, originally published as I Changed Gods, and more popularly published later as Hansi, the Girl Who Loved the Swastika in 1973. The book has sold more than 400,000 copies; later editions are titled Hansi: The Girl Who Left the Swastika. It was also published as a comic book by Spire Christian Comics.

Hirschmann founded Hansi Ministries in 1974.

== Political views ==
Hirschmann's scheduled participation in a February 2009 US Air Force Academy conference was canceled when, according to the academy, "the vetting process discovered that her 'views were not compatible' with those of the academy", saying "it had nothing to do with her religious views." In an interview with the Colorado Springs Gazette's religious writer several months later, she blamed her being disinvited on objections by First Amendment advocacy groups, and said that then-president Barack Obama "is the result of a trend in America that is going away from the Judeo-Christian ethic. Obama is a socialist, one step from communism. He could pave the way for a future Antichrist. Obama scares me because he has no record and people flock to him. Hitler also had no record, people flocked to him and both wrote a book. Christians laid flat and Hitler came to power, just like with Obama. Obama is the result of the secular news media brain washing America. The media put Obama into power. He is so inexperienced."

She clarified her views about the president in a 2010 newsletter, saying the adulation he received "reminded me of former times in Germany when Adolf Hitler was selected in a jubilant election to become the new leader of Germany, and within short years also the 'Fuehrer' for Austria and Czechoslovakia, etc. I was accused that I called Obama another Hitler, but I never did that. I am still not saying such a thing, but I do pray for President Obama very often; he needs it."

== Published works ==
=== Books ===
- I Changed Gods, Pacific Press Pub. Association, 1968.
- Hansi: The Girl Who Loved the Swastika, Tyndale House Publishers, Wheaton, Illinois, 1973.
- Hansi's New Life, Revell, 1975.
- Please Don't Shoot! : I'm Already Wounded: The Story of A Heartbreak and A Ministry, Tyndal House Publishers, Wheaton, Illinois, 1979.
- Learn of Me (co-author Betty Pershing), Hansi Ministries, 1979.
- Will the East Wind Blow?: Hansi reports on the Middle East, S.P.A.R.C. Pub. Co., 1979.
- Beyond Words - Bible Pictures for Daily Living, Volume 1 (co-author Betty Pershing), 2004.
- Whispering Streams - Bible Pictures for Daily Living, Volume 2, 2004
- Never Grow Old, ForPress, 2011.
- As a Man Thinketh So Is He, ForPress, 2013.
- Cuándo murieron mis dioses

=== Recordings ===
- Hansi: I Love You - A Patriotic Message
- The True American
