= Patsy Walker (comic book) =

The teen-humor heroine gets serious in Patsy Walker #116 (Aug. 1964) Cover art by Al Hartley

Patsy Walker is a comic book title featuring the character Patsy Walker originally published by Timely Comics beginning in 1945, by Atlas Comics from 1951 to 1961, and later by Marvel Comics.

== Publication history ==
Created by writer Stuart Little and artist Ruth Atkinson, Patsy Walker first appeared in Miss America Magazine #2 (cover-dated November 1944), published by Marvel precursor Timely Comics. Redheaded Patsy Walker, her parents Stanley and Betty, her boyfriend Robert "Buzz" Baxter, and her raven-haired friendly rival Hedy Wolfe appeared from the 1940s through 1967 in issues of Miss America, Teen Comics, Girls' Life, and the namesake teen-humor series Patsy Walker, as well as in the spin-offs Patsy and Hedy, Patsy and Her Pals, and the single-issue A Date with Patsy. Attesting to its quiet popularity, Patsy Walker (along with Millie the Model and Kid Colt, Outlaw) was among the very few titles published continuously by Marvel from the 1940s Golden Age of Comic Books, through Marvel's 1950s iteration as Atlas Comics, and into the 1960s Silver Age of Comic Books.

The first issue was published in 1945, and was published by Timely Comics until issue #36 (September 1951), while Atlas Comics continued the publication from #37 (November 1951) through #94 (April 1961), and Marvel Comics continued the publication beginning with issue #95 (June 1961).

Future Mad magazine cartoonist and Mad Fold-in creator Al Jaffee wrote and drew most of the early issues of Patsy Walker, several of which included Mad founding editor Harvey Kurtzman's highly stylized "Hey Look!" one-page humor strips. Jaffee was succeeded by Al Hartley, who went to Archie Comics and produced many Christian comic books starring Archie characters and others.

The high-school series Patsy Walker, co-created by Atkinson and writer Otto Binder in 1944, featured art by Al Hartley, Al Jaffee, Morris Weiss and others, and ran until 1967.

As Timely segued into Atlas Comics, Marvel's 1950s predecessor, Al Hartley made his mark with a more than decade-long run on the Patsy Walker teen-girl titles. With writer-editor Stan Lee, Hartley chronicled the redheaded high schooler's lightly comic adventures in her namesake series (which ran through 1964) and in its spin-offs, Patsy and Hedy (which ran through 1967) and the single-issue A Date with Patsy (Sept. 1957). Well into the Marvel era, Hartley also drew the "Special Queen Size Annual" publication Patsy Walker's Fashion Parade #1 (1966).

The last comic to bear the Atlas globe on the cover was the comic Dippy Duck #1, and the first to bear the new "Ind." distributors' mark was Patsy Walker #73, both cover-dated October 1957.

Patsy Walker #95 – together with the science-fiction anthology Journey into Mystery #69 (both June 1961) – are the first modern comic books labeled "Marvel Comics", with each showing an "MC" box on its cover.

Following Patsy's high-school graduation in issue #116 (Aug. 1964), the title switched from humor to become a young career-gal romantic adventure. Patsy Walker lasted through issue #124 (Dec. 1965), with Patsy and Hedy outlasting it to its own #110 (Feb. 1967).

Writer Steve Englehart later introduced the concept of Walker as a superhero in the Beast feature in Amazing Adventures #13 (July 1972). Englehart recalled that Walker's cameo in Fantastic Four Annual #3 had:

"struck my fan's eye by including her in the Marvel Universe. ... I thought it would be cool to bring her in as a real character, with things to do. Part of my 'training' as a Marvel writer was writing romance stories and Westerns, but Patsy [Walker] was defunct as a comic by the time I got there. ... Still, as a fan, I had collected everything Marvel, including Patsy Walker and Patsy and Hedy ... so I knew them as characters."

Patsy Walker #119 was reprinted in the collection "The Best Marvel Stories by Stan Lee" in 2022, while several issues were reprinted in the "Marvel Months" series beginning in 2021.
