= Bernard Fokke =

17th-century Frisian-born captain for the Dutch East India Company

Bernard or Barend Fokke, sometimes known as Barend Fockesz, was a 17th-century, Frisian-born captain for the Dutch East India Company. He was renowned for the uncanny speed of his trips from the Dutch Republic to Java. For example, in 1678, he traveled the distance in 3 months and 4 (or 10) days, delivering governor Rijckloff van Goens a stack of letters from which the traveling time could be confirmed. In later times, a statue was erected of him on the small island Kuipertje, near the harbor of Batavia. The statue was destroyed by the English in 1808.

His fast trips caused people to suspect that he was aided by the Devil, and he is often considered to have been a model for the legendary captain of the Flying Dutchman, a ghostly ship doomed to sail the seas forever.
