= Al Hartley =

American comic book artist (1921–2003)

- Born: Henry Allan Hartley; October 25, 1921 Kearny, New Jersey, U.S.
- Died: May 27, 2003 (aged 81) Fort Myers, Florida, U.S.
- Areas: Writer, Artist
- Notable works: Patsy Walker
- Awards: Inkpot Award, 1980
- Spouse: Hermine

Henry Allan Hartley (October 25, 1921 – May 27, 2003) known professionally as Al Hartley, was an American comic book writer-artist known for his work on Archie Comics, Atlas Comics (the 1950s precursor of Marvel Comics), and many Christian comics, especially under the Spire Christian Comics imprint. He received an Inkpot Award at the 1980 San Diego Comic-Con.

Hartley was the son of Congressman Frederick Allan Hartley, Jr., a New Jersey Republican remembered in history for the Taft-Hartley Act.

== Biography ==
=== Early life and career ===
Al Hartley was born in Kearny, New Jersey, the son of Hazel Hartley and Congressman Frederick Allan Hartley, Jr. (Republican from New Jersey), co-author of the Taft-Hartley Act of 1947. He had a brother, Jack, and a sister, Lorraine. Their father, Hartley said, "encouraged me. He knew I wanted to draw from the time I could hold a crayon.... My father wanted me to pursue my own dreams and never attempted to steer me in any other direction." Hartley drew for the local newspaper while still in high school, and studied at the Art Students League of New York. He began selling humorous spot illustrations to magazines, and drew a Western comic-book story about Tecumseh for the publisher Street & Smith before the U.S. joined World War II, after which he enlisted in the U.S. Army Air Corps and flew 20 missions as a B-17 Flying Fortress bomber pilot in Europe.

On his return, he became a commercial artist and made the rounds of comic-book publishers, quickly getting work with publisher Ned Pines' Standard Comics and its imprints Better Publications and Nedor Publishing. There he drew his first known credited work, the backup feature "Roger Dodger" in Exciting Comics #51–67 (Sept. 1946 – May 1949). Hartley also did humor one- and two-pagers for the publisher's America's Best Comics #20–28 (Dec. 1946 – Nov. 1948), as well as the feature "Zippie" in The Fighting Yank, and pieces for Startling Comics and Wonder Comics.

During this time he also did the backup features "Debbie" and "Teen Tales" in Michel Publications' Cookie, The Funniest Kid in Town; and "Peg" for ACG's The Kilroys. As well, his work appeared in the titles All Romances, Dotty, Dotty and Her Boyfriends, and Vicky for A. A. Wyn, Inc.'s Ace Comics.

=== Patsy (and Hedy) ===
In 1949, Hartley began freelancing for editor Stan Lee at Timely Comics, the progenitor of Marvel Comics. Hartley recalled,

I'd developed enough of a reputation that it wasn't difficult to get a job at Timely in 1949. Stan Lee knew my work and hired me. When I started working with Stan, he wrote most of my stories, although I later wrote all of my own stories. We did all kinds of genres: war, Westerns, detective, science-fiction — you name it. ... We’d take a theme, and I’d illustrate the story. There were no typed scripts, just a very loose plot line. It was my job to draw the story with as much excitement, surprise, and suspense as I could. Then, Stan would write the dialogue [in the manner of what would be called the "Marvel Method"]. It's hard to put a time frame on it, but I'd guess we started working that way in the mid-1950s.

As Timely segued into Atlas Comics, Marvel's 1950s predecessor, Hartley made his mark with a more than decade-long run on the Patsy Walker teen-girl titles. With writer-editor Lee, Hartley chronicled the redheaded high schooler's lightly comic adventures in her namesake series (which ran through 1964) and in its spin-offs, Patsy and Hedy (which ran through 1967) and the single-issue A Date with Patsy (Sept. 1957). Well into the Marvel era, Hartley also drew the "Special Queen Size Annual" publication Patsy Walker's Fashion Parade #1 (1966). Walker eventually would be integrated into mainstream Marvel Universe continuity in the 1970s as the supernatural superheroine Hellcat, long after Hartley had left the character.

The teen-humor heroine gets serious in Patsy Walker #116 (Aug. 1964). Cover art by Hartley

Also for Atlas, Hartley co-created Leopard Girl with writer Don Rico in Jungle Action, and drew such features as "The Black Rider" in Wild Western, and "Cliff Mason, White Hunter" in Jungle Tales. Hartley drew as well for the horror/suspense titles Mystic, Spellbound, Strange Tales, Adventures into Terror, and Mystery Tales, among many other Atlas books.

=== Silver Age of Comic Books ===
For Marvel in the 1960s, Hartley drew a single superhero comic: an episode of the Norse god superhero feature "Thor" in Journey into Mystery #90. He recalled that "superheroes weren't really my forte. I don't recall the circumstances that led me to draw that story. At that stage of the game, I was mostly doing work that I was more comfortable with, mostly teenage and humor stories." Harley dabbled in Marvel scripting on two stories: the "Iron Man" feature in Tales of Suspense #68 (Aug. 1965), and the last "Giant-Man" feature, in Tales to Astonish #69 (July 1965).

Among Marvel miscellanea, Hartley drew the 1961–63 series Linda Carter, Student Nurse, which began as a humor comic then became a romance with issue #2. After fellow Atlas artist Joe Maneely was killed in an accident in 1958, Hartley succeeded him on writer Stan Lee's syndicated comic strip Mrs. Lyon's Cubs. Hartley had done a short-lived gag-panel cartoon, Suburbia, the year before.

As well, he said, "There was one point in the early 1960s when I was Stan's assistant for about two months. I didn't feel comfortable in that position, so I went back to freelancing. As Stan's assistant, frankly, I did everything I normally did, and did some of the things that Stan did. I edited and wrote stories. I don't recall doing art corrections on anyone else's work."

=== Christian comics ===
In 1967, feeling "sterile, numb, and filled with fear", Hartley became a born again Christian, as did his wife, Hermine. At the time, he was among several artists who drew the black-and-white, "nudie cutie" secret-agent feature "Pussycat" that ran in some of Marvel publisher Martin Goodman's men's magazines; Hartley told the publisher that he couldn't continue.

The Hartley written-and-drawn Archie's One Way (Spire Christian Comics). Reissued at different price points, 1972 to circa 1977. This 39¢ version is from 1973.

He began writing and drawing for Archie Comics, infusing some of the stories with his Christian beliefs. At one point he was directed to cut back. "I knew God was in control, so I respected my publisher's position and naturally complied". He later received a call from publisher Fleming H. Revell, for whom he then freelanced a comic-book adaptation of David Wilkerson's The Cross and the Switchblade in 1972, quickly followed by adaptations of God's Smuggler by the pseudonymous Brother Andrew and The Hiding Place by Corrie ten Boom. Inspired, Hartley helped launch the Spire Christian Comics line, and pitched Archie president John L. Goldwater to let him license the Archie characters. The Jewish Goldwater, himself religious, agreed, and Spire went on to release 59 comics – at least 19 of them Archie titles, along with six Bible stories, 12 biography adaptations, four other book or film adaptations (including Hansi: The Girl Who Loved the Swastika), and nine children's comics.

Comics writer Kathleen Webb wrote,

It was Al's 'Betty's Diary' stories that intrigued me the most. He wrote a lot of them for the Betty & Me books in the early 1970s. ... Al's way of handling Betty as she shared her thoughts in her diary was with insight, humor and care. He never 'preached' in those pages; he just had Betty share her feelings, good and bad. His other Betty & Me stories were also written well, tackling Betty's relationship with Archie carefully, never making Betty out to be so much the 'sore loser' as the 'never-give-up-gal'.

=== Book illustration ===
Hartley wrote a 1977 memoir, Come Meet My Friend! (New Life Ventures) (F. H. Revell, ISBN 0-8007-9001-4), and a 1997 inspirational hardcover, It Takes a Family: How to Create Hope and Celebrate Your Future (Barbour Publishing, # ISBN 1-55748-946-7).

=== Personal life ===
Hartley and his wife of 61 years, Hermine, had two children, Fred and Alana. Hartley died May 27, 2003, aged 81, at Health Park Medical Center in Fort Myers, Florida.
