= Patsy and Hedy =

Comic book title

Patsy and Hedy is a comic book title featuring the character Patsy Walker originally published by Atlas Comics beginning in 1952 and later by Marvel Comics.

== Publication history ==
Created by writer Stuart Little and artist Ruth Atkinson, Patsy Walker first appeared in Miss America Magazine #2 (cover-dated November 1944), published by Marvel precursor Timely Comics. Redheaded Patsy Walker, her parents Stanley and Betty, her boyfriend Robert "Buzz" Baxter, and her raven-haired friendly rival Hedy Wolfe appeared from the 1940s through 1967 in issues of Miss America, Teen Comics, Girls' Life, and the namesake teen-humor series Patsy Walker, as well as in the spin-offs Patsy and Hedy, Patsy and Her Pals, and the single-issue A Date with Patsy.

The humor-comic version of Patsy (left) in Patsy and Hedy #72 (Oct. 1960), a spinoff of the flagship title Patsy Walker. Cover art by Al Hartley.

The first issue was published in with a cover date of February 1952, and was published by Atlas Comics until issue #76 (June 1961), while Marvel Comics continued the publication beginning with issue #77 (August 1961) with an Annual #1 in 1963.

As Timely segued into Atlas Comics, Marvel's 1950s predecessor, Al Hartley made his mark with a more than decade-long run on the Patsy Walker teen-girl titles. With writer-editor Stan Lee, Hartley chronicled the redheaded high schooler's lightly comic adventures in her namesake series (which ran through 1964) and in its spin-offs, Patsy and Hedy (which ran through 1967) and the single-issue A Date with Patsy (Sept. 1957).

Among the earliest work of Roy Thomas for Marvel included two issues of the teen-romance title Patsy and Hedy #104–105 (Feb.–April 1966).

Patsy Walker lasted through issue #124 (Dec. 1965), with Patsy and Hedy outlasting it to its own #110 (Feb. 1967).

Writer Steve Englehart later introduced the concept of Walker as a superhero in the Beast feature in Amazing Adventures #13 (July 1972). Englehart recalled that Walker's cameo in Fantastic Four Annual #3 had:

"struck my fan's eye by including her in the Marvel Universe. ... I thought it would be cool to bring her in as a real character, with things to do. Part of my 'training' as a Marvel writer was writing romance stories and Westerns, but Patsy [Walker] was defunct as a comic by the time I got there. ... Still, as a fan, I had collected everything Marvel, including Patsy Walker and Patsy and Hedy ... so I knew them as characters."

The Annual was reprinted in the "Women of Marvel: Celebrating Seven Decades" collection in 2011, while several issues were reprinted in the "Marvel Months" series beginning in 2021.
