= Hansi, the Girl who Loved the Swastika =

Autobiographical book

- Author: Maria Anne Hirschmann
- Publication date: 1968

Hansi: The Girl who Loved the Swastika is an autobiographical book by Czech-born American author Maria Anne Hirschmann. Originally published as I Changed Gods in 1968, it was more popularly released in 1973 as Hansi: The Girl Who Loved the Swastika, which according to her Amazon biography, sold more than 400,000 copies and was translated into several languages including Polish and Russian. Later editions are titled Hansi: The Girl who Left the Swastika. Her autobiography was also published as a comic book by Spire Christian Comics.

The book chronicles Hirschmann's early childhood as an orphan and her subsequent indoctrination by the Hitler Youth after the Nazi invasion of Czechoslovakia. At the end of World War II she fled from the Soviet-occupied territories to those controlled by the American army. Hirschmann describes her disillusionment with the Nazi ideology, which she calls brainwashing. She comes to repudiate Nazism and develops a great appreciation for the American people. The book concluded with her immigration to the United States where she founded a Christian ministry. Hirschmann has led Hansi Ministries since 1974 and released several more books discussing her youth and her religious beliefs.

== Comic book adaptation ==
In 1973, Hansi: The Girl who Loved the Swastika became one of Spire Christian Comics biographical series. Based on the autobiography, it was drawn by Al Hartley, a comic veteran whose career dated back to the 1940s, who became a born-again Christian later in life.

Comic book historian Fredrik Strömberg, in his 2010 book Comic Art Propaganda: A Graphic History, stated, "it's quite a fascinating story and becomes even more so when you know that it was based on a true story. The Hansi comic book was part of a series of biographies of famous Christians in the 1970s... the Hansi comic book was based on the autobiography of Maria Anne Hirschmann, who actually lived through most of what is described in the comic."

=== Plot ===
Hansi is a naïve young peasant girl in Sudetenland, who is mesmerized by the Führer and reading books. After the Sudetenland is transferred from Czechoslovakia to Germany in October 1938, she welcomes the Sudetenland "going home to the Reich". She wins a contest, organized by Adolf Hitler, that picks students for special training in National socialist schools in Prague. Her mother is delighted, but warns her in advance to "never forget Jesus Christ". As Hansi arrives in Prague, she is educated into antisemitism, but has doubts since Jesus himself was a Jew. Still, despite people informing her about the famine and horrors of the war she remains enthusiastic about Hitler.

Hansi is also in love with a German U-boat sailor named Rudy, but his parents disapprove of the marriage because she is just a peasant. Since she doesn't want to break him and his parents apart she breaks the relationship off. By now Hansi is so brainwashed that she condemns the Bible as "outdated" and only fit for "cowards and weaklings". As the war progresses Hansi and other people have to evacuate Prague because the Russians are on their way. Despite other people around her realizing that the war is a lost cause, Hansi remains confident in the Führer. She is sent off to a Russian prisoner camp, where she and other girls have to work in slave labor and become victim of rape, except for Hansi who is too skinny to be taken advantage of by the men. Hansi and a girlfriend decide to escape to the American prisoner camps, despite her friend's objections about the USA. They manage to cross the border safely and escape Red Army soldiers trying to shoot refugees. Despite all the misery around her, Hansi still has her faith in Jesus. As Hansi reaches the American prisoner camp, she is amazed how well the American soldiers treat her. As the war is over and Germany lies in rubble Hansi decides to become a teacher.

Then it turns out Rudy is still alive. They become a couple again, but after a year they feel something "is missing from their lives". Rudy re-introduces Hansi to the Bible, but she feels unsure whether she can still believe as she suffered through so much misery. Over the years she and Rudy raise a family and become good Christians. They travel to the US, where Hansi wonders whether all the materialism "obscured God's blessings" and made her students "troubled" and "unsure where to give their allegiance". As Hansi takes the flag salute, she is finally convinced about the goodness of the United States, when she hears the phrase "one nation under God", because "it's all right to love what God has blessed". Now Rudy and Hansi decide to promote the Bible to young people and explain the splendor of America's freedom.
