= Spire Christian Comics =

Line of comic books

Archie's One Way, a typical Spire comic book. Cover art by Al Hartley.

Spire Christian Comics was a line of comic books published by Fleming H. Revell starting in 1972.

In the 1980s, Barbour & Company, founded by Hugh Revell Barbour, acquired the rights to republish many of the titles in the Spire Christian Comics line under the New Barbour Christian Comics imprint, keeping the comics in print until 1988.

== History ==
Christian book publisher Fleming H. Revell had approached Al Hartley about doing comic book adaptions of Christian-themed books that they were publishing. Hartley was working for Archie Comics at the time. In 1972, they launched Spire with two titles, God's Smuggler and The Cross and the Switchblade.

Hartley's connection with Archie comics publisher John Goldwater helped Spire license the Archie characters in a Christian-themed series, and in 1973 they launched the first of 19 Archie titles, Archie's One Way. The Archie titles were published by Spire from 1973 through 1982 and are held by fans and scholars to be Spire's strongest work.

Other comics were based on true stories, Christian novels, or Christian movies. Examples of this type include those based on Charles Colson's Born Again, Corrie ten Boom's The Hiding Place, and a modernized version of Charles Sheldon's 1896 novel In His Steps.

A line of comics for very young children featured young Barney Bear, who lived with his parents in a cave in Yellowstone National Park.

The comics were created from 1972 and 1982 and kept in print for several years.

== List of titles ==
=== Archie series ===
- Archie and Big Ethel
- Archie and Mr. Weatherbee
- Archie Gets a Job
- Archie's Car
- Archie's Circus
- Archie's Clean Slate
- Archie's Date Book
- Archie's Family Album
- Archie's Festival
- Archie's Love Scene
- Archie's One Way
- Archie's Parables
- Archie's Roller Coaster
- Archie's Something Else!
- Archie's Sonshine
- Archie's Sports Scene
- Archie's World
- Christmas with Archie
- Jughead's Soul Food

=== Bible story adaptations ===
- Adam & Eve (modernized story)
- Alpha and Omega (modernized Adam and Eve/Jonah story)
- Jesus (also published as He's the Greatest!)
- Live It Up (also published as The Prodigal Son)
- My Brother's Keeper (modernized story of Joseph)
- Noah's Ark (modernized (somewhat) version of the story because God does destroy everything)
- Paul: Close Encounter of a Real Kind (modernized story of Paul the Apostle)

=== Biographical and autobiographical ===
- Attack! (Mitsuo Fuchida)
- Born Again (Chuck Colson)
- Corrie ten Boom's The Hiding Place
- Crossfire
- The Cross and the Switchblade (David Wilkerson)
- God's Smuggler (Brother Andrew)
- Hansi, the Girl who Loved the Swastika (Maria Anne Hirschmann)
- Hello, I'm Johnny Cash
- In the Presence of Mine Enemies (Howard Rutledge)
- On the Road with Andrae Crouch
- Through Gates of Splendor (Nate Saint and Jim Elliot)
- Tom Landry and the Dallas Cowboys
- Tom Skinner's Up from Harlem

=== Kiddies Christian Comics ===
- Barney Bear: Family Tree
- Barney Bear: Home Plate!
- Barney Bear in Toyland
- Barney Bear: Lost and Found
- Barney Bear Out of the Woods
- Barney Bear: Sunday School Picnic
- Barney Bear: The Swamp Gang
- Barney Bear Wakes Up!
- God Is...

=== Other book/movie adaptations ===
- Adventure with the Brothers: The Cult Escape
- Adventure with the Brothers: Smashing the Smugglers' Ring
- Adventure with the Brothers: Hang in There
- Hal Lindsey's There's A New World Coming
- In His Steps
- Time to Run
- Joseph T. Bayly's The Gospel Blimp

== See also ==
- Jack T. Chick
