= Joost van Straaten =

Joost van Straaten (also known as the "Ghost" or the "Flying Dutchman's Ghost") is a fictional character appearing in American comic books published by Marvel Comics. The character first appeared in Silver Surfer #8 (September 1969).

== Fictional character biography ==
Joost van Straaten was an 18th-century sea captain whose soul was claimed by Mephisto. In life, he was a greedy and cruel sailor who ignored warnings of a treacherous storm, resulting in his ship and crew being swallowed by the sea. Van Straaten was condemned to Limbo but bartered his soul to Mephisto for temporary freedom and supernatural abilities.

In return for these gifts, Mephisto ordered Van Straaten (now referred to as the "Flying Dutchman's Ghost"), to destroy the Silver Surfer. The wicked captain tried to kill the Surfer but eventually saw the monster he had become and rebelled against Mephisto. Enraged, Mephisto stripped him of his abilities and returned him to Limbo, where he would wander for eternity. However, the Surfer shed tears for the captain and forgave him; thus, his soul was liberated from Mephisto and he was permitted to enter Heaven.
