= Outline of science fiction =

Overview of and topical guide to science fiction

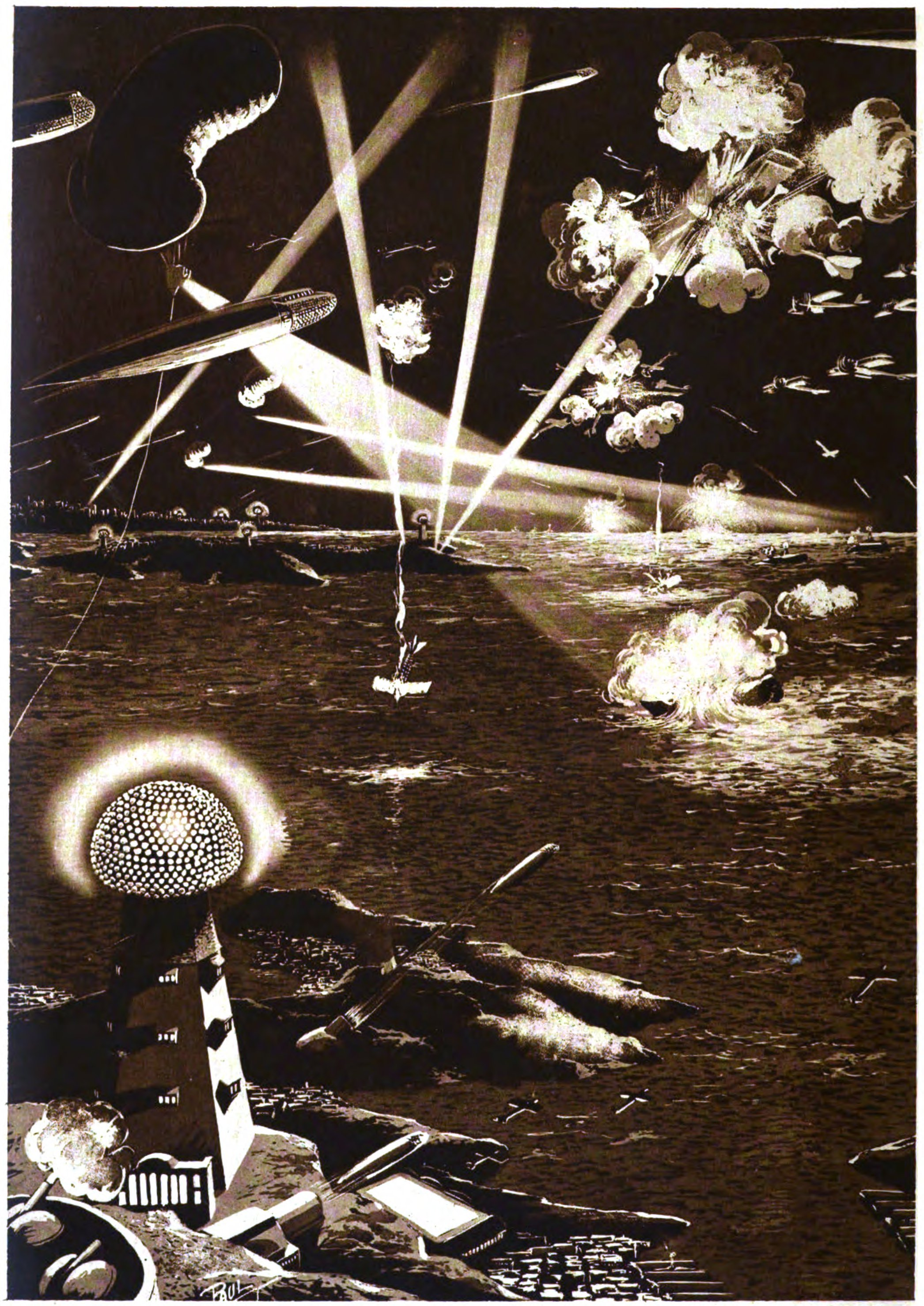
An illustration by illustrator Frank R. Paul, of inventor Nikola Tesla's speculative vision of a future war.

The following outline is provided as an overview of and topical guide to science fiction:

Science fiction – a genre of fiction dealing with the impact of imagined innovations in science or technology, often in a futuristic setting. Exploring the consequences of such innovations is the traditional purpose of science fiction, making it a "literature of ideas".

== What is science fiction? ==
- Definitions of science fiction: Science fiction includes such a wide range of themes and subgenres that it is notoriously difficult to define. Accordingly, there have been many definitions offered. Another challenge is that there is disagreement over where to draw the boundaries between science fiction and related genres.

Science fiction is a type of:

- Fiction – form of narrative which deals, in part or in whole, with events that are not factual, but rather, imaginary and invented by its author(s). Although fiction often describes a major branch of literary work, it is also applied to theatrical, cinematic, and musical work.
  - Genre fiction – fictional works (novels, short stories) written with the intent of fitting into a specific literary genre to appeal to readers and fans already familiar with that genre. Also known as popular fiction.
  - Speculative fiction
- Genre – science fiction is a genre of fiction.

== Genres ==
Science fiction genre – while science fiction is a genre of fiction, a science fiction genre is a subgenre within science fiction. Science fiction may be divided along many different overlapping axes. Gary K. Wolfe's Critical Terms for Science Fiction and Fantasy identifies over 30 subdivisions of science fiction, not including science fantasy (which is a mixed genre).

=== Science ===
Genres concerning the emphasis, accuracy, and type of science described include:

- Hard science fiction – a particular emphasis on scientific detail and/or accuracy.
- Mundane science fiction – a subgenre of hard sci-fi which sets stories on Earth or the Solar System using current or plausible technology.
- Soft science fiction – often exploring psychology, sociology, anthropology, and political science, focus on human characters and their relations and feelings. Emphasizes social sciences while de-emphasizing the details of technological hardware and physical laws. In some cases, science and technology are depicted without much concern for accuracy.

=== Characteristics ===
Themes related to science, technology, space and the future, as well as characteristic plots or settings include:

- Apocalyptic and post-apocalyptic science fiction – set during or after the collapse of civilization, often dealing with survival in harsh environments.
- Biopunk – centered around biotechnology and genetic engineering in general, biopunk uses some both (post)cyberpunk elements and post-modernist prose to describe a typically dystopian world of biohackers, man-made viruses, mutations, designer babies, artificial life forms, bio-genetic engineered human–animal hybrids and bio-genetically manipulated humans.
- Cyberpunk – Dystopian futures with a focus on technology, hacking, and cybernetics, often exploring the impact of these technologies on society. Uses elements from hardboiled detective novels, film noir, Japanese anime, and post-modernist prose to describe the nihilistic, underground side of a cybernetic society
- Climate fiction – emphasizes effects of anthropogenic climate change and global warming at the end of the Holocene era
- Utopian and dystopian fiction – Utopian set in societies that have agreeable features exploring themes of freedom. Dystopian set in oppressive, controlled societies, often exploring themes of totalitarianism or societal collapse.
- Dying Earth science fiction
- Military science fiction – focuses on armed conflicts, space warfare, and military themes in futuristic or interstellar settings
- Steampunk – denotes works set in (or strongly inspired by) an era when steam power was still widely used, usually the 19th century, and often set in Victorian England, though with otherwise retro-futuristic inventions, advanced technology or other science fiction elements
- Time travel – involving traveling to the past or future, often focusing on the paradoxes and consequences.
- Space colonization
- Space opera – Adventures set in space, emphasizes romantic adventure, exotic settings, and larger-than-life characters, may involve large-scale conflict or galaxy-spanning narratives
- Social science fiction – concerned less with technology and more with sociological speculation about human society
- Mundane science fiction

=== Movements ===
Genres concerning politics, philosophy, and identity movements include:

- Christian science fiction
- Feminist science fiction
- LGBT themes in speculative fiction
- Libertarian science fiction

=== Eras ===
Genres concerning the historical era of creation and publication include:

- Scientific romance – an archaic name for what is now known as the science fiction genre, mostly associated with the early science fiction of the United Kingdom.
- Pulp science fiction
- Golden Age of Science Fiction – a period of the 1940s during which the science fiction genre gained wide public attention and many classic science fiction stories were published.
- New Wave science fiction – characterised by a high degree of experimentation, in form and content.
- Cyberpunk – noted for its focus on "high tech, low life" and taking its name from the combination of cybernetics and punk.

=== Combinations ===
Genres that combine two different fiction genres or use a different fiction genre's mood or style include:

- Alternate history science fiction – fiction set in a world in which history has diverged from history as it is generally known
- Comic science fiction
- Science fiction erotica
- Adventure science fiction – science fiction adventure is similar to many genres
- Gothic science fiction – a subgenre of science fiction that involves gothic conventions
- New Wave science fiction – characterized by a high degree of experimentation, in form and content
- Science fantasy – a mixed genre of story which contains some science fiction and some fantasy elements
- Science fiction opera – a mixture of opera and science fiction involving empathic themes
- Science fiction romance – fiction which has elements of both the science fiction and romance genres
- Science fiction mystery – fiction which has elements of both the science fiction and mystery genres, encompassing Occult detective fiction and science fiction detectives
- Science fiction Western – fiction which has elements of both the science fiction and Western genres
- Space Western – a subgenre of science fiction that transposes themes of American Western books and film to a backdrop of futuristic space frontiers.
- Spy-fi – a subgenre of spy fiction that includes some science fiction.

== Related genres ==
- Fantasy
- Science fantasy
- Mystery fiction
- Horror fiction
- Slipstream fiction
- Utopian and dystopian fiction
- Superhero fiction

== By country ==
- Australian science fiction
- Bengali science fiction
- Canadian science fiction
- Chilean science fiction
- Chinese science fiction
- Croatian science fiction
- Czech science fiction
- Estonian science fiction
- French science fiction
- Japanese science fiction
- North Korean science fiction
- Norwegian science fiction
- Polish science fiction
- Romanian science fiction
- Russian science fiction
- Serbian science fiction
- South Korean science fiction
- Spanish science fiction
- Yugoslav science fiction

== History ==
- History of science fiction films

== Elements and themes ==
=== Character elements ===
- List of stock characters in science fiction
- Extraterrestrials in fiction

=== Plot elements ===
==== Plot devices ====
- Hyperspace

=== Setting elements ===
The setting is the environment in which the story takes place. Alien settings require authors to do worldbuilding to create a fictional planet and geography. Elements of setting may include culture (and its technologies), period (including the future), place (geography, astronomy), nature (physical laws, etc.), and hour. Setting elements characteristic of science fiction include:

==== Place ====
- Parallel universes
- Planets in science fiction
- Hyperspace
- Slipstream
- Earth in science fiction

==== Cultural setting elements ====
- Utopian and dystopian fiction
- Xenology

==== Sex and gender ====
- Gender in science fiction
- Sex in science fiction
  - Pregnancy in science fiction
  - LGBT themes in speculative fiction

=== Themes ===
- First contact

==== Technology ====
- Computer technology
  - Artificial intelligence in fiction
  - List of fictional computers
  - Mind uploading in fiction
- Transportation
  - Flying car (aircraft)
  - Space dock
- Weapons in science fiction
- Resizing
- Space warfare in fiction
  - Weapons in science fiction

== Works ==
=== Art ===
- List of science fiction and fantasy artists
  - Science fiction comics

=== Games ===
- Science fiction video game
- Space flight simulation game
- List of space flight simulation games

=== Literature ===
- Science fiction comics
- Speculative poetry

==== Novels ====
- List of science fiction novels

==== Short stories ====
- List of science fiction short stories

===== Short story venues =====
- Science fiction magazine
- Science fiction fanzine

=== Video ===
- Science fiction film
- Science fiction on television
  - List of science fiction television programs
    - List of science fiction sitcoms
  - U.S. television science fiction
  - British television science fiction

=== Radio ===
- Science fiction radio programs

== Information sources ==
- Baen Free Library
- Internet Speculative Fiction DataBase
- Science Fiction and Fantasy Writers of America
- The Encyclopedia of Science Fiction

== In academia ==
- Science fiction studies
  - New Wave science fiction
  - Science in science fiction
    - Materials science in science fiction
- Science fiction and fantasy journals
- Science fiction libraries and museums

== Subculture ==
- Science fiction conventions
  - List of science fiction conventions
  - List of fan conventions by date of founding
- Science fiction fandom
  - Science fiction fanzine
- Science fiction organizations

== Awards ==
The science fiction genre has many recognition awards for authors, editors, and illustrators. Awards are usually granted annually.

=== International awards ===
Major awards given in chronological order:

International Awards
Years awarded	Name	Description
since 1953	Hugo Award	for general science fiction
since 1965	Nebula Award	for science fiction and fantasy
since 1966	Edward E. Smith Memorial Award (the Skylark)	for significant contributions to science fiction
since 1970	BSFA award	for British science fiction
since 1970	Seiun Award	for Japanese science fiction
since 1971	Locus Award	for science fiction, fantasy, and new authors (separate awards)
since 1972	Saturn Award	for film and television science fiction
since 1973	John W. Campbell Memorial Award	for best science fiction novel
since 1978	Rhysling Award	for best science fiction poetry, given by the Science Fiction Poetry Association
1979–1985	Balrog Awards	for the best works and achievements of speculative fiction in the previous year, in various categories
since 1979	Prometheus Award	for libertarian science fiction
since 1982	Philip K. Dick Award	for science fiction published in paperback
since 1987	Arthur C. Clarke Award	
since 1987	Theodore Sturgeon Memorial Award	for best short science fiction
since 1996	Méliès d'Or	for science fiction, fantasy and horror films
since 2003	Robert A. Heinlein Award	"for science fiction and technical writings [that] inspire the human exploration of space"
since 2006	Parsec Award	
since 2016	Dragon Awards	
since 2017	Nommo Award	recognise works of speculative fiction by Africans
since 2021	Mike Resnick Memorial Award for Short Fiction	for the best Science Fiction Short Story by a New Author

=== Nationality-specific awards ===
Australian
- Aurealis Award – Australian
- Chandler Award – for contributions to Australian Science fiction
- Ditmar Award – for SF by Australians
British
- Kitschies – for speculative fiction novels published in the UK
Canadian
- Constellation Awards – for the best SF/fantasy film or television works released in Canada
- Prix Aurora Awards – for Canadian science fiction
- Sunburst Award – Juried award for Canadian science fiction
Chinese
- The Galaxy Awards (银河奖) – given by magazine Science Fiction World for Chinese SF&F
Croatian
- SFERA Award – given by SFera, a Croatian SF society
Dutch
- Paul Harland Prize – for Dutch SF
Estonian
- Stalker Award – for the best Estonian SF novel, given out on Estcon by Eesti Ulmeühing, the Estonian SF society.
Finnish
- Tähtivaeltaja Award – for the best SF novel released in Finland
French
- Grand Prix de l'Imaginaire – France since 1974
- Prix Jules-Verne – France 1927–1933 and 1958–1963
- Prix Tour-Apollo Award – France 1972-1990
German
- Kurd-Laßwitz-Preis – German SF award
Israeli
- Geffen Award (פרס גפן) – Israel since 1999
Italian
- Premio Urania – for Italian SF
Japanese
- Nihon SF Taisho Award (日本SF大賞) – Japan since 1980
New Zealander
- Sir Julius Vogel Award – for SF by New Zealanders
Pacific Northwestern
- Endeavour Award – for SF by Pacific Northwest author
Polish
- Janusz A. Zajdel Award – award of Polish fandom
- Nautilus Award – Polish award
Romanian
- SRSFF Award – România
Russian
- Big Roscon award for outstanding contribution to science fiction
Turkish
- TBD Science Fiction Story Award – Turkey

=== Themed awards ===
(Chronological)

- Big Heart Award – since 1959
- Prometheus Award – best libertarian SF – since 1979
- Lambda Literary Award – since 1988
- Tiptree Award – since 1991
- Golden Duck Award – best children's SF – 1992-2017
- Sidewise Award for Alternate History – since 1995
- Gaylactic Spectrum Awards – since 1999
- Emperor Norton Award – San Francisco – 2003-2011
- Science Fiction & Fantasy Translation Awards – 2011–2014

=== New artists / first works awards ===
- Compton Crook Award – for best first novel
- Jack Gaughan Award – for best emerging artist
- John W. Campbell Award – for best new writer
- Writers of the Future – contest for new authors

=== Career awards ===
- Damon Knight Memorial Grand Master Award – associated with the Nebula

== Influential people ==
=== Creators ===
==== Artists ====
- List of science fiction and fantasy artists

==== Filmmakers ====
- J. J. Abrams
- James Cameron
- George Lucas
- Christopher Nolan
- Ridley Scott
- Steven Spielberg
- Denis Villeneuve

==== Authors and editors ====
- List of science-fiction authors
  - Women in speculative fiction
- List of science fiction editors

=== Science fiction scholars ===
- Brian Aldiss
- Isaac Asimov – Asimov on Science Fiction
- Brian Attebery
- E. F. Bleiler
- John W. Campbell
- John Clute – co-editor of The Encyclopedia of Science Fiction (with Peter Nicholls)
- Samuel R. Delany
- Hugo Gernsback – founder of the pioneering science fiction magazine Amazing Stories, and the person who the Hugo Awards are named after.
- David Hartwell
- Larry McCaffery
- Judith Merril
- Sam Moskowitz
- Peter Nicholls – co-editor of The Encyclopedia of Science Fiction (with John Clute)
- Alexei Panshin
- David Pringle – editor of Foundation and Interzone; author of Science Fiction: The 100 Best Novels
- Andrew Sawyer
- Dorothy Scarborough
- Brian Stableford
- Darko Suvin
- Gary K. Wolfe

== Franchises ==
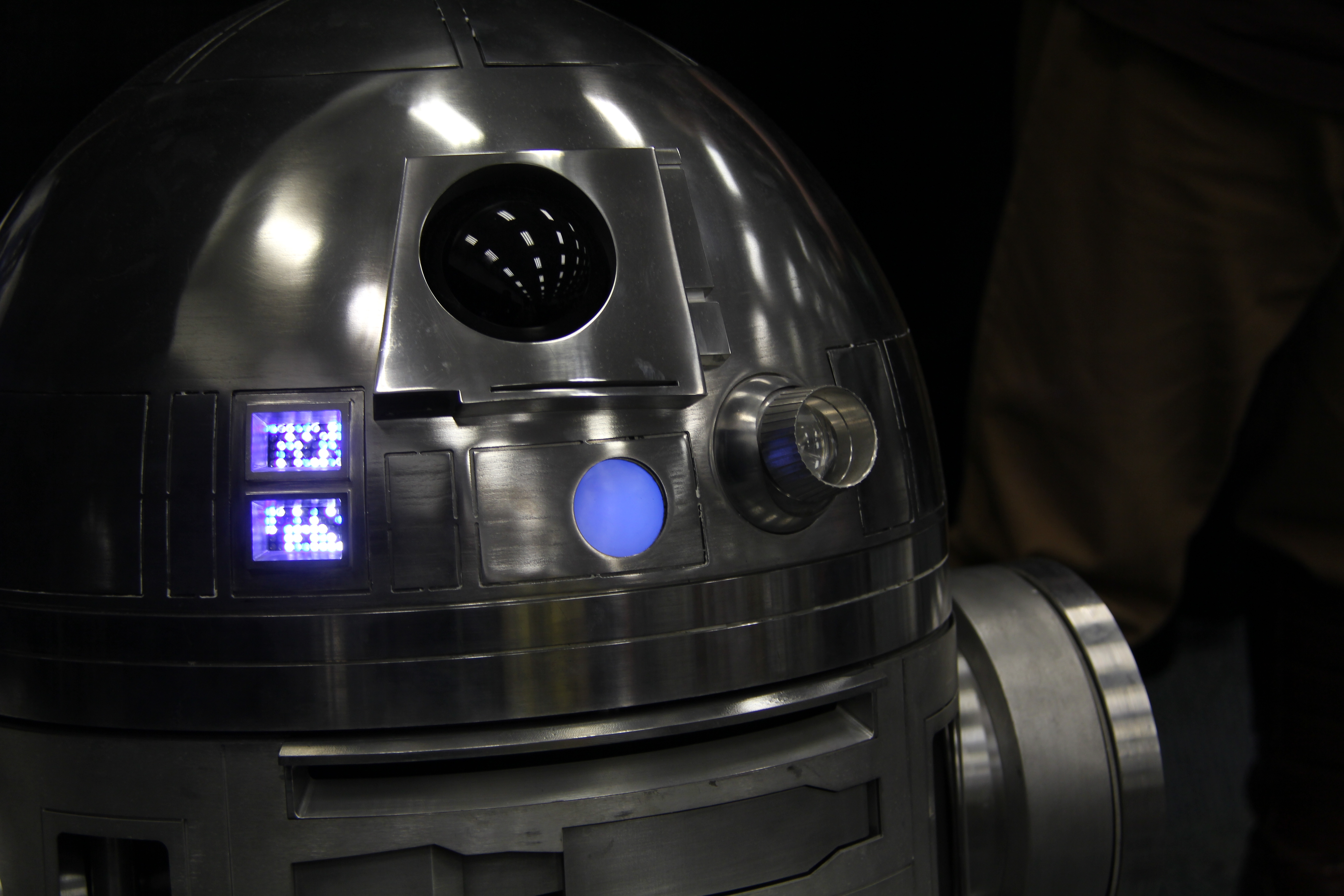
Star Wars Celebration in Anaheim (SWCA) - From Droid Builder's Club Room

Many science fiction media franchises exist, typically encompassing media such as cinema films, TV shows, toys, and even theme parks related to the content. The highest-grossing science fiction franchise is Star Wars.

Space science fiction franchises:

- Alien (6 films since 1979 and 2 Alien vs Predator films since 2004)
- Babylon 5 (2 television series, 7 TV movies since 1993)
- Battlestar Galactica (5 television series and two TV movies since 1979)
- Divergent (4 novel series since 2011, 3 movies since 2014)
- Doctor Who (TV series since 1963, 2 Dr. Who films since 1965, and 1 1996 television film, five spinoff TV shows (K-9 and Company, The Sarah Jane Adventures, Torchwood, K-9 and Class), video games and hundreds of books)
- Dune (23 novels since 1965, 1 film in 1984, 3 comics since 1984, 2 TV series since 2000, 1 film in 2021 and its sequel in 2024)
- Godzilla (36 films since 1954 and 3 TV series since 1978)
- Halo (since 2001, started from video game)
- The Hitchhikers Guide to the Galaxy (1 film, 1 TV series, 1 game, 4 stage shows, 3 radio programs since 1978, 6 novels)
- Independence Day (2 films since 1996)
- Legend of the Galactic Heroes (2 novel series since 1983 and 3 anime OVA series since 1988)
- Macross (4 anime TV series since 1982, 6 anime films since 1984, 3 manga series since 1994)
- Mass Effect (since 2007, started from video game)
- Men in Black (4 films since 1997 and animated TV series)
- Mobile Suit Gundam (21 anime TV series since 1979, 7 anime films since 1988, successful model kits since 1980)
- Neon Genesis Evangelion (1 anime TV series since 1995 and 5 anime films since 1997)
- Planet of the Apes (10 films and 1 TV series since 1968)
- Predator (5 films since 1987 and 2 Alien vs Predator films since 2004)
- Robotech (1 anime TV series and 5 anime films since 1985)
- Space Battleship Yamato (5 anime TV series since 1974 and 7 anime films since 1977)
- Starcraft (since 1998, started from video game)
- Space Odyssey (2 films since 1968, 4 novels since 1968, 1 1972 book)
- Star Trek (7 live-action TV series since 1966, 3 animated TV series, 13 Theatrical films: 6 Original Series films since 1979, 4 Next Generation films since 1994 and 3 reboot films since 2009)
- Star Wars (9 episodic "Saga" films since 1977, 1 1978 TV film, 2 Ewok films since 1985, 1 2008 The Clone Wars film, 2 "Anthology" films since 2016, 5 canon animated TV series since 2008, 6 canon live-action TV series since 2019, 3 Legends TV series since 1985)
- Stargate (3 theatrical and TV films since 1994, 4 live-action TV series since 1997 and 1 animated TV series from 2003)
- The Expanse (8 novels and 1 television series since 2011)
- Transformers (28 TV series since 1984, 4 animated films since 1986, 7 live action films since 2007, started from toy line)
- Ultra Series (34 TV series since 1966 and 29 films since 1967)
- The Matrix (franchise) (5 films since 1999)
- The War of the Worlds (half a dozen feature films, radio dramas, a record album, various comic book adaptations, a number of television series, and sequels or parallel stories by other authors since 1897)
- Warhammer 40,000 (family of tabletop wargames first published in 1987 by Games Workshop, hundreds of novels by Games Workshop's in-house publishing company Black Library, dozens of video games, and several short films and web series officially published by GW. Games Workshop recently signed a development deal with Amazon Studios to develop a Warhammer 40,000 TV series, with Man of Steel and The Witcher star Henry Cavill as both producer and playing a starring role.)

== See also ==
- List of science fiction themes
- Outline of fiction
- Outline of fantasy
- Timeline of science fiction
