= Sfera =

Sfera may refer to:

== Groups, organizations ==
- Sfera (retailer), Spain-based fast casual clothing chain owned by El Corte Inglés group
- SFera, Croatian science fiction group

== Spaceflight ==
- Sfera (geodesy satellite), Soviet satellite class of the 1960s and 70s for geodetic survey
- Sfera (calibration satellite), set of passive calibration satellite deployed from ISS in 2012 and 2017
- Sfera (satellite constellation), a telecom project for a satellite group by the Russian Federation

== Arts, entertainment, media ==
- Sfera Stin Kardia, Greek music album
- Sfera Politicii, Romanian magazine
- Sfera con Sfera, Italian sculpture
- SFERA Award, of the Croatian SF group SFera
- SFeraKon, conference by Croatian SF group SFera

== Other uses ==
- Sfera (helmet), Russian helmet
- Sfera (mall), Polish mall
- Lazăr Sfera (1909–1992), Romanian footballer
