= Perković =

Perković may refer to:

- Perković, Croatia, a village near Šibenik, Dalmatia
- Perković (surname), a Croatian surname
