= Perković (surname) =

Perković (also spelled Perkovich) is a surname commonly found in Croatia. It is the 26th most common surname in the country. It may refer to:

- Borimir Perković (born 1967), Croatian football manager
- Dalibor Perković (born 1974), Croatian science fiction writer
- Josip Perković (born 1945), former agent of the Yugoslav State Security Service (SDB)
- Korina Perkovic (born 1987), German tennis player
- Luka "Perkz" Perković (born 1998), Croatian professional gamer
- Mile Perković (1921–2013), Yugoslav partisan, economist, and sports administrator
- Marko Perković (born 1966), also known as Thompson, Croatian singer-songwriter
- Mauro Perković (born 2003), Croatian footballer
- Nathan Perkovich (born 1985), Croatian American former professional ice hockey player
- Sandra Perković (born 1990), Croatian discus thrower
- Sandro Perković (born 1984), Croatian football manager
- Tom Perkovich (born 1980), American college football coach
- Vlado Perkovic (born 1969), Australian physician and researcher

== See also ==
- Perković, Croatia, a village in Šibenik-Knin County
- Stari Perkovci, Croatia, a village in Brod-Posavina County
- Percovich, surname
