= SFERA Award =

Croatian science fiction award

The SFera Award is awarded annually by the science fiction society SFera in Zagreb since 1981. Until 1991, it was given to participants from whole of Yugoslavia, but since 1994 only for works originally published in Croatian.

The SFera award is given to the best accomplishments in science fiction (as well as in fantasy and horror genre) first published or shown in Croatia over the preceding year.

At the beginning, the award was only for literary works, but with time, expanded to many categories. Currently it is awarded in the following categories: miniature (very short story), short story, story, novella, novel, novel for children, drama, poetry, color illustrations, black-white illustrations, and comic book.

Other mediums (costimography, sculpture, film, video, music) are designated as "special achievements". It is also awarded for life's work and from time to time, a special award for newcomers, called Protosfera.

== Winners ==
=== 1981 ===
- Story: Goran Hudec, Prsten
- Novel: Miha Remec, Prepoznavanje (slovenski author)
- Dedication: emisija Eppur si muove Radio Zagreb

=== 1982 ===
- Story: Radovan Devlić, Hajka
- Life work: Zvonimir Furtinger
- Dedication: Dušan Vukotić

=== 1983 ===
- Story: Biljana Mateljan, Vrijeme je, maestro
- Dedication: Sirius magazine

=== 1984 ===
- Story: Slobodan Čurčić, Šume, kiše, grad i zvezde (srpski author)
- Novel: Branko Belan, Utov dnevnik
- Dediacation: IRO Politika (Belgrade) and Brane Dimitrović

=== 1985 ===
- Story: Hrvoje Prćić, Ana s onu stranu zrcala
- Comic book: Željko Pahek
- Dedication: Galerija Studentskog centra u Zagrebu, Boban Knežević i Talijanski kulturni centar u Zagrebu

=== 1986 ===
- Story: Slobodan Petrovski, Most
- Novel: Predrag Raos, Mnogo vike nizašto
- Dedication: Centar za kulturu Pešćenica, Technical Museum in Zagreb, Borivoj Jurković

=== 1987 ===
- Story: Miha Remec, Spomenik Euridiki (slovenski author)
- Comic book: Igor Kordej
- Dedication: Žiga Leskovšek, IRO Prosveta (Beograd)

=== 1988 ===
- Story: Vladimir Lazović, Sokolar
- Dedication: Dobrosav Bob Živković

=== 1989 ===
- Story: Predrag Raos, Škorpion na jeziku
- Life's work: Gavrilo Vučković (srpski urednik)

=== 1990 ===
- Story: Radovan Devlić, Zatvor
- Novel: Radivoje Lola Đukić, Ovca na Bulevaru Oktobarske revolucije (srpski author)

=== 1991 ===
- Story: Vera Ivosić-Santo, Evici, s ljubavlju
- Novel: Predrag Raos, Nul effort
- Special achievements: Zoran Živković, Enciklopedija naučne fantastike (srpski teoretičar)

=== 1992 ===
Not awarded.

=== 1993 ===
Not awarded.

=== 1994 ===
- Story: Darko Macan, Mihovil Škotska Snježnica
- Illustration: Aleksandar Žiljak

=== 1995 ===
- Short story: Darko Macan, Pročitaj i daj dalje
- Story: Jasmina Blažić, Kuća na broju 15
- Novella: Jasmina Gluhak, Nataša Pavlović, One Shot
- Illustration: Igor Kordej

=== 1996 ===
- Short story: Mario Berečić, Ovo je moja nesreća
- Story: Tatjana Jambrišak, Duh novog svijeta
- Drama: Hrvoje Kovačević, Profesionalna deformacija
- Color illustration: Igor Kordej
- Black-white illustration: Aleksandar Žiljak
- Life's work: Krsto A. Mažuranić i Ivica Posavec
- Protosfera: Zvjezdana Odobašić, for novel Čudesna krljušt

=== 1997 ===
- Miniature: Denis Peričić, Diptih o doktoru
- Short story: Dean Fabić, Svi njihovi životi
- Story: Aleksandar Žiljak, Slijepe ptice
- Novel: Predrag Raos, Od rata do zvijezda
- Color illustration: Karlo Galeta
- Black-white illustration: Tihomir Tikulin
- Special achievement: Urban & 4, for the album Otrovna kiša

=== 1998 ===
- Miniature: Zdenko Vlainić, Buba
- Short story: Tatjana Jambrišak, Crveno i crno
- Story: Goran Konvični, Pet minuta do budućnosti
- Drama: Marijana Nola, Don Huanov kraj
- Illustration: Bojan Tarticchio
- Life work: Zdravko Valjak
- Protosfera: Andrija Jakić, a.n.d.

=== 1999 ===
- Miniature: Aleksandar Žiljak, Prvi let
- Short story: Jasmina Blažić, Kraj stoljeća
- Story: Zoran Pongrašić, Dijagonala
- Drama: Denis Peričić, Netopir
- Novel: Milena Benini Getz, Kaos
- Color illustration: Željko Pahek
- Black-white illustration: Esad T. Ribić
- Life work: Damir Mikuličić

=== 2000 ===
- Miniature: Zoran Vlahović, Lovci slave
- Short story: Irena Krčelić, Gubilište
- Story: Krešimir Mišak, Svijet iduće sekunde
- Novella: Dalibor Perković, Banijska praskozorja
- Drama: Ivana Sajko, Idući površinom
- Illustration: Goran Šarlija

=== 2001 ===
- Miniature: Aleksandar Žiljak, Hladni dodir vatre
- Short story: Igor Lepčin, Blijedonarančasta Tineluss
- Story: Vanja Spirin, Nimfa
- Novella: Krunoslav Gernhard, Libra mrtvieh nazivja
- Novel: Darko Macan, Koža boje masline
- Essay: Igor Marković, U vrtlogu stvarnosti - Dick čitan Flusserom
- Illustration: Robert Drozd
- Life work: Živko Prodanović
- Special achievement SFERAKON 2000: Tajana Štasni
- Protosfera: Marin Medić, za priču Trkač

=== 2002 ===
- Miniature: Kristijan Novak, Posljednjih sedam milisekundi
- Short story: Viktoria Faust, Teško je biti vampir
- Story: Želimir Periš, Tisućljeće
- Novella: Igor Lepčin, Nebo iznad Marijane
- Black-white illustration: Davor Rapaić (for book 'Neusporediva' protiv slučajne sličnosti)
- Illustration: Tatjana Jambrišak (for www.tatjana.ws)
- Dedication: Bojan Krstić (for the magazine Futura)

=== 2003 ===
- Miniature: Zoran Krušvar, Igra
- Short story: Marina Jadrejčić, Tužna madona
- Story: Tatjana Jambrišak, Ima li bolje zabave, moje dame?
- Novel for children: Darko Macan, Pavo protiv Pave
- Novel: Dejan Šorak, Ja i Kalisto
- Black-white illustration: Filip Cerovečki (Lovecraftova galerija)
- Illustration: Štef Bartolić (naslovnica Monolitha)
- Dedication: Dvotjedniku Zarezu for article Philipu Kindredu Dicku

=== 2004 ===
- Miniature: Zoran Krušvar, Brodovi u tami
- Short story: Viktoria Faust, Vrištač
- Story: Danilo Brozović, Prsti
- Novella: Dalibor Perković, Preko rijeke
- Novel for children: Zvonko Todorovski, Prozor zelenog bljeska
- Novel: Ivan Gavran, Sablja
- Illustration: Milivoj Ćeran, za Vile hrvatskih pisaca
- Protosfera: Jurica Palijan, Bili ste divna publika
- Dedication: elektronski fanzin NOSF

=== 2005 ===
- Miniature: Saša Škerla, Bilo jednom
- Short story: Bojan Sudarević, Cyberfolk
- Story: Krešimir Mišak, Akvarij sa zlatnim ribicama
- Novella: Zoran Pongrašić, Letač
- Novel: Oliver Franić, Araton
- Illustration: Darko Vučenik (za naslovnicu knjige Čuvari sreće Z. Pongrašića)
- Special achievement: Vlatko Jurić-Kokić, Davor Šišović

=== 2006 ===
- Miniature: Zoran Janjanin, Primarna zdravstvena...
- Short story: Petra Bulić, Antarktički vjetar
- Story: Danilo Brozović, Anne Droid
- Novella: Milena Benini, McGuffin Link
- Novel: Dalibor Perković, Sva krv čovječanstva
- Illustration: Tomislav Tomić (cover Zeleno sunce, crna spora D. Brozovića)

=== 2007 ===
- Miniature: Dario Rukavina, Ima li piljaka tamo gore, na jugu? (zbirka Blog.SF)
- Short story: Viktoria Faust, Riana u sutonu sivom (zbirka Vampirske priče)
- Story: Danijel Bogdanović, 87. kilometar (zbirka Zagrob)
- Novel: Veselin Gatalo, Geto
- Illustration: Nela Dunato, You don't own me (naslovnica časopisa NOSF)
- Special achievement: Tomislav Šakić, Aleksandar Žiljak, Ad Astra – Antologija hrvatske znanstveno-fantastične novele 1976-2006
- Life work – Mladen Bjažić

=== 2008 ===
- Miniature: Danijel Bogdanović, Decimala ("Krivo stvoreni", Pučko otvoreno učilište Pazin, 2007)
- Short story: Ivana D. Horvatinčić, Post mortem ("Priče o starim bogovima", Pučko otvoreno učilište Pazin, 2007)
- Story: Nikola Kuprešanin, Karakuri ningyo (NOSF magazin br. 25, 2007)
- Novella: Danilo Brozović, Besmrtna Diana ("Trinaesti krug bezdana", Mentor i SFera, 2007)
- Novel: Predrag Raos, Let Nancija Konratata (Izvori, 2007)
- Novel for children: Darko Macan, Dlakovuk (Knjiga u centru, 2007)
- Essay: Zoran Kravar, Duboka fikcija - J. R. R. Tolkien (Ubiq br.1, Mentor, 2007)
- Poetry collection: Tatjana Jambrišak, Slova iz snova (Mentor, 2007)
- Special achievement: Zoran Krušvar, Multimedijalni projekt Izvršitelji nauma Gospodnjeg
- Comic book: Ivan Marušić, Entropola (Mentor, 2007)
- Special achievement for Ubiq magazine design: Melina Mikulić
- Protosfera: Vesna Bolfek, Snijeg i pepeo ("Priče o starim bogovima", Pučko otvoreno učilište Pazin, 2007)

=== 2009 ===
- Miniature: Ed Barol, Zadnja vožnja (Dobar ulov, Pučko otvoreno učilište, Pazin, 2008)
- Story: Dario Rukavina, Nek' se ne zna traga, Ljeljo! (Zlatni zmajev svitak, SFera & Mentor, 2008, Zagreb)
- Novella: Zoran Krušvar, Tako mora biti (Ubiq 3, Mentor, 2008, Zagreb)
- Novel: Sanshal Tamoya, Dobitnik (Slovo, 2008, Zagreb)
- Novel for children: Igor Lepčin, Vražje oko (Knjiga u centru, 2008, Zagreb)
- Illustration: Biljana Mateljan, cover Zlatni zmajev svitak (SFera & Mentor, 2008, Zagreb)
- Black-white illustration: Frano Petruša, ilustracije i knjizi Zvijeri plišane Zorana Krušvara (Knjiga u centru, 2008, Zagreb)
- Essay: dr. Nikica Gilić, Filmska fantastika i SF u kontekstu teorije žanra (Ubiq 2, Mentor, 2008, Zagreb)
- Life work: dr. Darko Suvin, professor emeritus
- Protosfera: Valentina Mišković, Izgubljeni bijeli brat (Eridan 7, Treći zmaj, 2008, Rijeka)

=== 2010 ===
- Miniature: Zoran Janjanin, Quare desperamus? (Treća stvarnost, Pučko otvoreno učilište, Pazin, 2009)
- Short story: Milena Benini, Plesati zajedno pod polariziranim nebom (Priče o dinosaurima, Pučko otvoreno učilište, Pazin, 2009)
- Story: Zoran Vlahović, Svaki put kad se rastajemo ... (Ubiq 5, Mentor, Zagreb, 2009)
- Novel: Damir Hoyka, Xavia (VBZ, Zagreb, 2009)
- Novel for children: Ivana D. Horvatinčić, Pegazari (Knjiga u centru, Zagreb, 2009)
- Drama: Tanja Radović, zbirka drama Ledeno doba (Meandar, Zagreb, 2009)
- Illustration: Tomislav Tikulin, cover Staklene knjige kradljivaca snova Gordona Dahlquista (Algoritam, Zagreb, 2009)

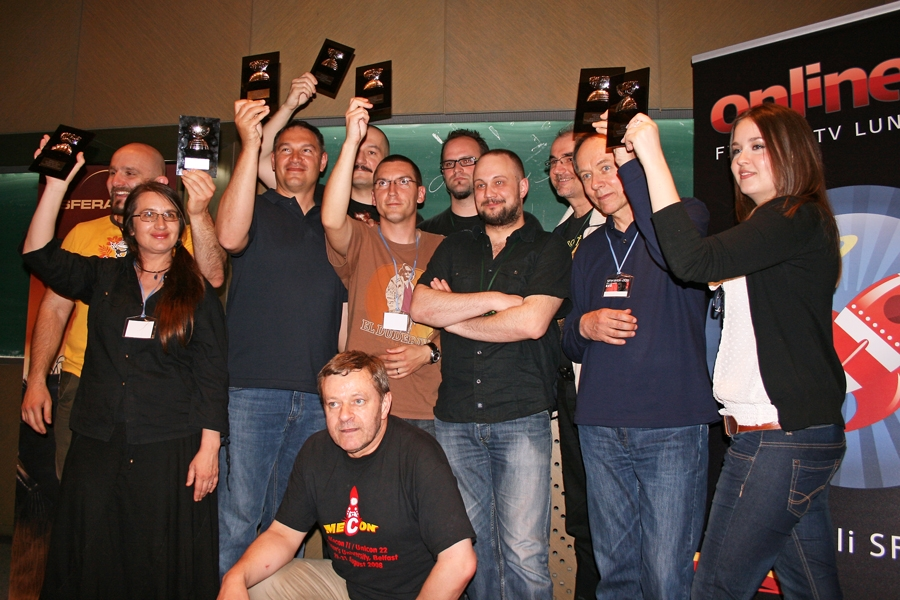
Winners of SFERA in 2011

=== 2011 ===
- Miniature: Ed Barol Avangarda (Dimenzija tajne, Pučko otvoreno učilište, Pazin, 2010)
- Short story: Sanja Tenjer, Kao iz pera Arbine bake (Priče o zvijezdama, Pučko otvoreno učilište, Pazin, 2010.)
- Story: Katarina Brbora, Starozavjetna (Ubiq 6, Mentor, 2010, Zagreb)
- Novella: Danijel Bodganović, Sjećaš li se zečića na Suncu? (Ubiq 7, Mentor, 2010, Zagreb)
- Novel: Marko Mihalinec & Velimir Grgić, Kriza (Algoritam, 2010., Zagreb)
- Essay: Zoran Kravar, Kad je svijet bio mlad:visoka fantastika i doktrinarni antimodernizam, Mentor, 2010. Zagreb
- Black-white illustration: Zdenko Bašić, illustrations in novel Luna (Algoritam, 2010, Zagreb)
- Illustration: Marko Horvatrin, coveer of fanzine Eridan broj 9 (Treći zmaj, 2010, Rijeka)

=== 2012 ===
- Shorty story: Aleksandar Žiljak, Lesija, u daljini Heraklovi stupovi (Turističke priče, Pučko otvoreno učilište, Pazin, 2011)
- Story: Igor Rendić, Jednom, negdje (Ubiq 9, Mentor, 2011, Zagreb)
- Novel: Franjo Janeš, Formula za kaos (Algoritam, 2011, Zagreb)
- Novel for children: Darko Macan Djed Mrz (Knjiga u centru, 2011, Zagreb)
- Essay: Milena Benini, Divide et morere, (Književna republika 10-12, 2011, Zagreb)
- Illustration: Zdenko Bašić, Sjeverozapadni vjetar, (Planetopija, 2011, Zagreb)
- Special achievement: Magazine Književna republika for topic about Darko Suvin
- Life work: Želimir Košćević
- Protosfera: Antonija Mežnarić, Svakoj priči jednom mora doći kraj (Laboratorij Fantastike 2, 2011, Rijeka)

=== 2013 ===
- Miniature: Vesna Kurilić, Priča supružnika
- Shorty story: Aleksandar Žiljak, Srneći but s lisičicama, uz njega teran iz zbirke Priče o vinu
- Story: David Kelečić, Imago ultima
- Novel: Aleksandar Žiljak, Irbis
- Novel for children: Norma Šerment-Mikulčić Adrijanin vrt
- Theory: Petra Mrduljaš, work: Prstenovi koji se šire: Junačka potraga u djelima J. R. R. Tolkiena
- Black-white illustration: Korina Hunjak, Loki, published infanzine Eridan
- Illustration: Mario Rosanda, cover of Priče o vinu

=== 2014 ===
- Miniature: David Kelečić, Dječak i mora
- Short story: Irena Hartmann, Lutke
- Novel: Tomica Šćavina, Povratak genija
- Novel for children: Nataša Govedić, Mrežir, zemlja mačaka i zmajeva
- Theory: Rafaela Božić, Distopija i jezik: distopijski roman kroz oko lingvostilistike
- Special achievement: Predrag Ličina, Teleport Zovko

=== 2015 ===
- Miniature: Jurica Ranj, Korisnička služba (Parsek, br.123, SFera, Zagreb, 2014.)
- Short story: Davor Šišović, Zavarivači (Prsten sa one strane sna, Lokalni javni emiter Radio Bijelo Polje, Bijelo Polje, Crna Gora, 2014.)
- Story: Zrinka Pavlić, Sava pod Sljemenom (Imaš vatre, Jesenski i Turk, 2014.)
- Novel: Tanja Tolić, Zovem se nebo (Naklada Ljevak, 2014.)
- Novel for children: Jelena Radan, Zeda (Algoritam, Zagreb, 2014.)
- Theory: Slaven Škapul, Imaginarij distopijskog filma (UBIQ, časopis za književnu fantastiku, br.15, SFera, Zagreb, 2014.)
- Special achievement: Astra Larp, creators Ivana Delač & Vesna Kurilić (2014.)

=== 2016 ===
- Miniature: Goran Gluščić, Staklo (Nema što nema, 21. SFeraKonska zbirka, SFera, Zagreb, 2015.)
- Novel: Milena Benini, Prodavač snova (Hangar 7, Zagreb, 2015.)
- Novel for children: Morea Banićević, Demon školske knjižnice (Algoritam, Zagreb, 2015.)

=== 2017 ===
- Miniature: Danijel Bogdanović, Svemirka (Sirius B broj 29, Hangar 7, Zagreb 2016.)
- Story: Jurica Ranj, Projekcije (UBIQ, časopis za književnu fantastiku, broj 19, SFera, Zagreb 2016.)
- Novella: Ed Barol, Bijela promenada (Sirius B broj 27, Hangar 7, Zagreb 2016.)
- Novel: Veronika Santo, Granice na vjetruu (Matica hrvatska, Ogranak Bizovac, 2016.)
- Novel for children: Branka Primorac, Moj brat živi u kompjuteru (Alfa, Zagreb 2016.)
- Comic book: Darko Macan & Igor Kordej, Mi, Mrtvi (Fibra, Zagreb 2016.)
- Theory: Milena Benini, Samo običan putujući apotekar: teatralnost, androginija i folklorni elementi kao faktori drugosti u središnjem liku serije MoNoNoKe (UBIQ, časopis za književnu fantastiku, broj 19, SFera, Zagreb 2016.)
- Special achievement: Hrvoje Krlić & Tomislav Buntak, for interior design of hostel Subspace

=== 2018 ===
- Miniature: Goran Čolakhodžić, Sredstva proizvodnje (Homo Climaticum, Zelena akcija, 2017.)
- Short story: Tajana Vujnović, Gospa od smrti (UBIQ, časopis za književnu fantastiku, broj 21, SFera, Zagreb 2017.)
- Story: Darko Macan, Sirene hipersvemira (Sfumato, SFera, Zagreb 2017.)
- Novel for children: Vesna Kurilić, Izazov krvi (SFera, Zagreb, 2017.)
- Theory: Silvestar Mileta, Alternativna povijest: Wegnerova konceptualizacija podžanra u okviru utopijskih studija (UBIQ, časopis za književnu fantastiku, broj 20, SFera, Zagreb 2017.)
- Illustration: Sebastijan Čamagajevac, cover of Vanja Spirin's novel Junker's i Vailiant protiv sila tame (Hangar 7, Zagreb, 2017.)

=== 2019 ===
- Miniature: Ed Barol, Kopija (Greške u koracima, Pučko otvoreno učilište, Pazin, 2018.)
- Short story: Igor Rendić, Screensaver (Transreali, SFera, Zagreb, 2018.)
- Story: Veronika Santo, Uvijek nedjeljom (UBIQ, časopis za književnu fantastiku, broj 23, SFera, Zagreb 2018.)
- Poetry: Živko Prodanović, … iz ciklusa “empatija vječnosti” (Parsek, broj 136, SFera, Zagreb, 2018.)
- Novel: Pavao Pavličić, Bakrene sove (Mozaik Knjiga d.o.o., Zagreb, 2018.)
- Theory: Tatjana Peruško, U labirintu teorija : O fantastici i fantastičnom (Hrvatska sveučilišna naklada, Zagreb 20168.)
- Illustration: Davorin Horak, cover Adrian Tchaikovsky's Djeca vremena (Hangar 7, Zagreb, 2018.)
- Protosfera: Antea Benzon, Govorim istinu, (Sirius B broj 40, Hangar 7, Zagreb 2018.)

=== 2020 ===
- Miniature: Aleksandar Žiljak, Božanstvo (Zrnca spoznaje, Pučko otvoreno učilište & Albus, Pazin, 2019.)
- Short story: Milena Benini, Šuma ponad mora (Autorske bure, V.B.Z. d.o.o. & Rijeka 2020, Zagreb, 2019.)
- Story: Irena Rašeta, Zahira (Abeceda Beskraja, SFera & Hangar 7, Zagreb, 2019.)
- Novella: Ed Barol, Superman u kućnom ogrtaču (Sirius B, broj 45, Hangar 7, Zagreb, 2019.)
- Novel for children: Morea Baničević, Dvojnici iz tame (Hangar 7, Zagreb, 2019.)
- Theory: Aleksandar Žiljak, Zvijezde u noći: politička predavanja o filmskoj fantastici (Hangar 7, Zagreb, 2019.)
- Special achievement: Luka Hrgović, Dino Julius, Anton Svetić, short movie Slice of Life (Zagreb, 2019.)

=== 2021 ===
- Miniature: Srebrenka Peregrin, DecamerOna (Decameron 2020: Priče iz karantene, Vlastita naklada, Hrvatska, 2020.)
- Short story: Ed Barol, Sve što ostaje (Pasta Italiana al Mare, F&ST, Split, 2020.)
- Story: Igor Rendić, Obješeni muškarac (Decameron 2020: Priče iz karantene, Vlastita naklada, Hrvatska, 2020.)
- Novel: Krešimir Čorak, Zemlja vukova (Studio HS internet d.o.o., Osijek, 2020.)

=== 2022 ===
- Miniature: Dominik Plejić, Utrka s preponama (Morina Kutija broj 2, Shtriga, Rijeka, 2021.)
- Short story: Nikolina Pavleković, Čovjek bez prošlosti (Svjetla dalekih obala, SFera, Zagreb, 2021.)
- Story: Mirko Karas, Leš za keš (UBIQ, časopis za književnu fantastiku, broj 29, SFera, Zagreb 2021.)
- Novella - Mihaela Marija Perković, Teutina ladja (UBIQ, časopis za književnu fantastiku, broj 28, SFera, Zagreb 2021.)
- Novel: Marijan Šiško, Orao i zvijezde (Studio HS internet d.o.o., Osijek, 2021.)
- Comic book: Korina Hunjak, Rubedo, Prologue (Strip–Prefiks, časopis za strip i kulturu broj 1, Hrvatski autorski strip, Osijek 2021.)

=== 2023 ===
- Miniature: Srebrenka Peregrin, Kupelj (Morina Kutija broj 4, Shtriga, Rijeka, 2022.)
- Short story: Jurica Ranj, Put do mora (Marsonic, broj 21, Studio HS internet d.o.o., Slavonski Brod, 2022.)
- Story: Luna Tatjana Val, Jedan dan u životu Toneta Pljuckala (UBIQ, časopis za književnu fantastiku, broj 31, SFera, Zagreb 2022.)
- Novella: Vedran Mavrović, Tišina kao… (Marsonic, broj 22, Studio HS internet d.o.o., Slavonski Brod, 2022.)
- Novel: Luka Bekavac, Urania (Fraktura, Zagreb, 2022.)
- Comic book: Darko Macan, Space opera (OHOHO zin, broj 4, Autonomni kulturni centar, Zagreb, 2022.)
- Special achievement: Srebrenka Peregrin & Erika Katačić Kožić, ciklus Bajkarenje (Bajkarice, Bajkari, Bajkarenje)

=== 2024 ===
- Miniature: Emanuel Ježić-Hammer, Zmajarica i seljak (Devet mikrokozmosa, SFera, Zagreb, 2023.)
- Story: Hrvoje Kmoniček, Kraljevstvo njegovo (Devet mikrokozmosa, SFera, Zagreb, 2023.)
- Novella: Zoran Krušvar, Rupa (Marsonic, broj 23, Studio HS internet d.o.o., Slavonski Brod, 2023.)
- Novel for children: Saša Veronek Germadnik, Na granici (ne)mogućega (Naklada Ljevak, Zagreb, 2023.)
- Young adult novel: Boris Dežulović, Život i snoviđenja neustrašivog žohara Zaštomira (Ex Libris, Rijeka, 2023.)
- Novel: Ed Barol, Boja neba (Hangar 7, Zagreb, 2023.)
- Comic book: Igor Kordej, Darko Macan, Texas Kid, moj brat (Fibra, Zagreb, 2023.)
- Special achievement: Igor Rendić, Vesna Kurilić, Antonija Mežnarić: project/podcast Mora FM (Rijeka, 2023.)

== See also ==
- SFeraKon
