= Sphere (disambiguation) =

A sphere is a three-dimensional object shaped like a ball; it may also refer to a sphere-like region or shell.

Sphere may also refer to:

== Astronomy ==
- Armillary sphere, a physical model of the celestial sphere
- Celestial sphere, the astronomical description of the sky
- Celestial spheres or planetary spheres, refer to a geocentric model of the universe and the associated postulate of a "Musica Universalis" (Music of the Spheres)
- Dyson sphere, a hypothetical megastructure that encompasses a star and captures a large percentage of its solar power output
- Hill sphere, the spherical region around an astronomical body where the primary gravitational influence on an orbiting object is that body
- Spectro-Polarimetric High-Contrast Exoplanet Research (SPHERE) is an adaptive optics system and coronagraphic facility at the Very Large Telescope (VLT)
- Sphere of influence (astrodynamics), similar to the Hill sphere, but smaller, only about 60% of the radius
- Sphere of influence (black hole), a region around a supermassive black hole
- SPHERES (Synchronized Position Hold, Engage, Reorient Experimental Satellites), a formation flight testbed developed by MIT's Space Systems Laboratory
- SPHEREx (Spectro-Photometer for the History of the Universe, Epoch of Reionization, and Ices Explorer), a proposed space telescope

== Human sciences ==
- Separate spheres, an ideological term referring to separation between a private sphere and a public sphere in some societies
- Sphere of influence, a metaphorical region of influence surrounding a country, person or concept

== Mathematics ==
- n-sphere, the set of points at fixed distance from a central point in n+1 dimensional space
- Spherical surface, the boundary of a sphere (also known simply as sphere in mathematics)
- Spherical volume, the region inside a sphere (also known as a ball in mathematics)
- Unit sphere, the set of points at a distance of 1 from a central point

== Arts, entertainment, and media ==
=== Architecture ===
- Sunsphere
- The Sphere, a bronze sculpture at Liberty Park, New York City

=== Films ===
- Sphere (1998 film), a film based on Crichton's 1987 novel, starring Dustin Hoffman, Sharon Stone, and Samuel L. Jackson
- Sphere (2013 film), an animated short film

=== Literature ===
- Sphere (novel), a 1987 science-fiction novel by Michael Crichton
- Spheres trilogy, three books by the philosopher Peter Sloterdijk
- De sphaera mundi (The Sphere), a medieval astronomy book by Johannes de Sacrobosco
- The Sphere (newspaper), a British weekly newspaper which ran between 1900 and 1964

=== Music ===
==== Groups ====
- Sphere (American band), American jazz ensemble
- Sphere (group), a Japanese pop idol unit
- Sphere (Polish band), a death metal band from Poland

==== Albums and songs ====
- Sphere (album), a 1997 album by the American jazz group Sphere
- Sphere, a 2005 album by noise music artist Merzbow
- "Sphere", a song by John Frusciante and Josh Klinghoffer from their album A Sphere in the Heart of Silence (2004)
- Spheres (Delerium album)
- "Spheres" (instrumental), a 2007 single by Mike Oldfield
- Spheres (Pestilence album), 1993
- Spheres, an album by Daniel Hope
- Spheres 2, a 1994 album by Delerium

== Other uses ==
- Sphere, a parameter in prescribing corrective lenses
- Silver Sphere (born 1999), American singer-songwriter
- Sphere, an extraterrestrial artificial intelligence that allies with humans from Independence Day: Resurgence
- Spheres (TV series), a Korean animation
- Sphere (organization), a project launched in 1997 to develop a set of minimum standards in core areas of humanitarian assistance
- Sphere (website), a blog search engine
- Sphere, a rumored internal development name for the PlayStation Move controller
- Sphere 1, one of the earliest personal computers
- Sphere Books, a British paperback-publisher from the 1960s to the 1980s and the 2000s to today
- Sphere (venue), a sphere-shaped entertainment venue in Paradise, Nevada
- The Sphere (social network), an online network for renting luxury properties
- The Spheres, a fictional planetary system in Coldplay's album Music of the Spheres

== See also ==
- Sfera (disambiguation)
- Sphering (disambiguation)
