= Croatian science fiction =

Croatian literature, novels and stories

Croatian science fiction consists mostly of literature, novels and stories published in various magazines and story collections, and some movies and graphic novels. The first Croatian occurrence of science fiction happened in 1919 and since then, the region has seen the birth and death of several countries/states. This dynamic left a mark on the genre.

== Beginnings (1919–1940) ==
The first elements of science fiction in Croatian literature appeared in the novel "Crveni ocean" ("Red Ocean") written by Marija Jurić-Zagorka. Zagorka was almost exclusively a mainstream author and "Crveni ocean" was an adventure novel with occasional SF elements. This is why it is usually considered that the first "real" Croatian science fiction novel was "Na Pacifiku godine 2255." ("In the Pacific in the Year 2255") by Milan Šufflay. Where Zagorka only touched the SF motifs for the purpose of an adventure story, Šufflay dived into the genre with all of its apparatus: technological achievements and social and political change. As the title says, the novel takes place in the far future, following the collapse of Western civilization.

The pre-WWII era ended with a few more authors and novels, mostly serialized in newspapers, such as "Gospodin Čovjek" ("A Man of Stature") by Mato Hanžeković in 1932, and "Muri Massanga - the Man Who Conquered the World" by Mladen Horvat in 1927, with the latter even printed in Germany as "Der Neger Muri" ("The Black Man Muri"). Josip Smolčić used the pseudonym Aldion Degal to publish several novels: "Atomska raketa" ("The Atomic Rocket") in 1939, "Zrake smrti" ("The Death Rays") in 1932 and "Smaragdni skarabej" ("The Emerald Scarab") in 1938. "Majstor Omega osvaja svijet" ("Master Omega Conquers the World"), serialised in 1940 and signed by "Stan Rager" (a pseudonym for Stanko Radovanović and Zvonimir Furtinger) was also popular.

== After World War II (1950–1975) ==
During World War II, there was little room for publishing any literature, with Croatia ultimately ending up in political turmoil. As soon as the situation stabilised, the genre started recovering, first through publishing science fiction works from USA and Soviet Union, and then works by one of the aforementioned authors - Zvonimir Furtinger - who began a tandem with Mladen Bjažić and published several novels over the course of a decade, starting in 1959.

A wide spectrum of topics can be gleaned from the titles alone: "Osvajač 2 se ne javlja" ("Conqueror Two Not Responding") in 1959, "Svemirska nevjesta" ("The Space Bride"), “Varamunga – tajanstveni grad" ("Varamunga – the Mysterious City"), the young adult novel "Zagonetni stroj profesora Kružića" ("The Mysterious Machine of Professor Kružić") in 1960, "Mrtvi se vraćaju" ("The Dead Return") in 1965, "Ništa bez Božene" ("Nothing Without Božena"- actually an extended version of "Professor Kružić") in 1970. Topics ranged from aliens, cosmic disasters, AI, matter replication and so on. Bjažić and Furtinger reached high levels of popularity, basically paving the way for the subsequent growth of not only SF in Croatia, but also within Yugoslavia as a whole.

As opposed to more or less classic, hard(er) SF, Angelo Ritig wrote two novels: "Sasvim neobično buđenje" ("A Quite Unusual Awakening") in 1961 and "Ljubav u neboderu" ("Love in a Skyscraper") in 1965, which were more aimed at psychology and character development.

== Years of Sirius (1976–1989) ==
1976 was a crucial year for Croatian and Yugoslav science fiction. This year brought two events that set the tone for the genre in the whole region for the next few decades. The first one was the establishment of SFera, the science fiction fan club in Zagreb. The second was the founding of Sirius, a magazine that published science fiction stories mostly originating in the US and the United Kingdom, but occasionally picking the best works from other countries, mainly - but not exclusively - the Soviet Union.

Sirius was published by Vjesnik, the central news and magazine company in Croatia. Vjesnik had a large number of different titles under its roof, from various entertainment, TV, enigmatic magazines, through issues that specialized in various hobbies and all the way to pulp genre literature like westerns and love or crime stories. The first editor of Sirius, effectively its founder, was Borivoj Jurković, who held the position for several years.

At its peak, Sirius reached a circulation of nearly 40,000 copies (for comparison, Yugoslavia had a population of around 20 million), making it the third largest science fiction magazine in the world at the time. Also, in 1980 and 1984, Sirius was declared the best European SF magazine. During the 13 years of its existence, around 500 stories by Croatian authors were published on its pages. Apart from the aforementioned Bjažić and Furtinger, new names emerged to become the cornerstones of Croatian SF. These included Predrag Raos, Darko Macan, Vera Ivosić-Santo (later known as Veronika Santo), Branko Pihač, Živko Prodanović, Neven Antičević (who went on to become the founder of one of the biggest publishing houses and bookstore chains in Croatia), Radovan Devlić (mainly a comic author), Damir Mikuličić, Darije Đokić and many others.

In parallel to all of this, SFera immediately outgrew its initial role as a SF fan club. In its second year, SFera started its fanzine Parsek. Parsek had a concept similar to western fanzines - which was in turn similar to that of professional magazines - to nurture writers and theoretical work, as well as acting as a bulletin for the club members. Since 1979, SFera has also organized SFeraKon, its annual SF convention, which immediately became the biggest fan and professional gathering in the region.

In addition, SFera established the first literary award in Croatia called "Sfera award". Sfera was first awarded in 1981 and has been active since. In 1996 SFera also started a youth program, organizing a national contest for stories and literary works for all primary and secondary school students in the whole country. Several hundred works per year have been revised, with the latest number of entries going into more than a thousand. Some of the later emerging authors got their first break from this contest.

== The Independence War and the Aftermath (1990–2000) ==
The war for independence caused the breakup of Yugoslavia and the collapse of socialist system followed. The fragmentation of the market into six smaller republics (some of which were at war with each other) was detrimental to the publishing projects that became more risky and of questionable profitability. After the initial shock of a war, the science fiction scene soon started showing signs of life. After the 1991 SFeraKon was skipped due to war, the convention resumed in 1992.

Sirius was extinguished in 1989 at a circulation of around 10,000. There was a three-year lull and then, in 1992, a small private publisher started what was to be the spiritual heir to Sirius, a magazine called Futura. Its first editor was Vlatko Jurić Kokić (he later joined SFera and even participated in organising SFeraKon), but starting from the 6th issue in spring of 1993 replaced by Krsto A. Mažuranić, one of the founders of Sfera. Since then, Futura has regularly published at least one story written by a Croatian author each month. With a smaller market and unfavorable cultural circumstances, Futura has continuously struggled on the edge of existence with its circulation rarely - if ever - reaching 1000 sold copies and usually going around 500 per issue.

In 1995 - although this was planned for 1994 - SFera started publishing an annual short story collection with exclusively Croatian authors. Initiated by Darko Macan and Tatjana Jambrišak, with Macan being the first editor, the series jump-started the new generation of Croatian writers, some of whom would become well known in the years and even decades to come. Alongside Macan, who had already published stories in Sirius, the most important is Aleksandar Žiljak, a prolific author who had previously published stories in Croatian daily newspapers and magazines, but also SFera's fanzine Parsek.

Several SF conventions and SF clubs were established by the year 2000: Kutikon in Kutina, Essekon in Osijek (Essek being the Hungarian name for the city), RiKon in Rijeka (organised by the Aurora club) and Istrakon in Pazin (organised by the Albus club).

== 21st century ==
In 2003, SFera took another step forward, starting to publish author anthologies under the joint name "Biblioteka SFera". Twelve anthologies were published in three years. Those anthologies represented the previous 10–15 years of their authors’ work and served as the cornerstone of Croatian science fiction of that decade.

The year 2006 brought "Ad Astra - an Anthology of Croatian Science Fiction Stories 1976-2006", gathering 30 stories by 30 authors published in the past three decades.

Fanzines also started to flourish with Prime (by Aurora), SFemir and several others. Additionally, in 2002 the Istrakon crew started publishing their own collection of miniature stories (up to 1000 words). The same year the Festival of Fantastic Literature was established, also taking place in the city of Pazin, publishing their story collection every year from 2006. Another convention emerged in 2006 - Liburnicon in Opatija.

After 30 years of having a single award for national science fiction literature, a second award was established in Rijeka by the "3. zmaj" SF club ("The Third Dragon", a successor to Aurora). Both the SFERA and Artefakt for several categories continue to be awarded every year.

New fandom and semi-professional groups have emerged since 2010: in Slavonski Brod the SF group "Orion" came into being with a convention called "Marsonicon" (after Marsonia, the old Roman name of the city), a series of Croatian and regional SF annual collection series titled "Marsonic", started in 2012, and a fanzine named "Svemirski Brod" in 2013. By the end of the decade, the city of Split followed suit with FantaSTikon and one more series of annual collections of Croatian science fiction in print.

In 2020, eight years after the first Croatian Eurocon, the second was held in Rijeka along with Rikon, dubbed Futuricon. Due to the COVID-19 pandemic, it was held mostly on-line with lectures, talks, panels and other program items broadcast through Discord and other networks.

A project started by a small publisher named Hangar 7, was another continuation: that of the never forgotten Sirius. The first issue of Sirius B saw the light of day in 2011 and continued with the old concept: mostly translated foreign stories, with most, if not all, coming from the English-speaking world - due to scarcity of funds needed for translating from other languages, this was the only option - and the occasional story by Croatian authors.

In 2019 a different kind of project emerged: Alienus publishing, based on self-sufficiency. The idea is that the full profit of a book is directed towards publishing subsequent books and the work on publishing a new book starts only once there are sufficient funds.

== Films ==
- Izbavitelj (1977)
- Visitors from the Galaxy (1981)
- Infection (2003)
- Zagorski specijalitet (2012)
- Zetstapo (2012)
- Reptiloid (2013)
- Moj dida je pao s Marsa (2019)
- Slice of Life (2019)

== Awards ==
- SFERA Award
- Artefakt

== Magazines ==
- Sirius (1976–1989)
- Futura (1992–2005)
- Ubiq
- Sirius B
- Morina kutija

=== Conventions ===
- SFeraKon (http://sferakon.org/)
- IstraKon (https://web.archive.org/web/20161101121604/http://www.istrakon.hr/)
- RiKon (http://www.3zmaj.hr/rikon/)
- Liburnicon (former Abbacon) (http://www.liburnicon.com)
- FantaSTikon
- Krakon
- Isle of Wonders

=== Societies ===
- SFera (http://www.sfera.hr)
- 3. Zmaj (http://www.3zmaj.hr)
- Udruga F&ST (https://www.udrugafst.hr/)
- Krapinjon (https://www.krapinjon.hr/)
- U.S.S. Croatia (http://www.usscroatia.hr)
- Udruga Shtriga
- Realms Long Forgotten (https://realmslongforgotten.com/)
- Klub Titan Atlas (http://klubtitanatlas.hr/)

=== Fanzines ===
- Parsek (http://parsek.sfera.hr)
- Via Galactica (http://viagalactica.com)
- NOSF (http://nosf.net)
- Eridan (http://www.3zmaj.hr/eridan/)
- The Void Fanzin (http://thevoidfanzin.wordpress.com/)

== See also ==
- Serbian science fiction
- Yugoslav science fiction
