= Reptiloid (film) =

- Film poster
- Directed by: Marin Mandir
- Written by: Marin Mandir
- Produced by: Kinoklub Zagreb
- Starring: Marin Mandir; Goran Kramarić; Goran Dujmić
- Cinematography: Josip Stipetic
- Edited by: Maja Kadoic Raos
- Release date: 7 November 2013 (Croatia)
- Running time: 29 minutes
- Country: Croatia
- Language: Croatian

Reptiloid (Croatian: Gmaz) is a 2013 Croatian short horror science-fiction film directed by Marin Mandir. It stars Mandir, Goran Kramarić and Goran Dujmić. The story revolves around police officers Petar and Darko, who are sent to investigate a murder deep in a forest on a hill, but encounter a mysterious, giant reptile there. Reptiloid won the special mention of the jury at the 2014 Kinoklub Zagreb revue of films.

== Plot ==
The story revolves around police officers Petar and Darko, who are sent to investigate a murder deep in a forest on a hill. As they park their car, Darko goes further inside the forest on foot, in search for clues, while Petar stays at the car. However, as the support crew fails to show up, and Darko disappeared with the car key, Petar is forced to spend the night in the forest. The next morning, Petar goes to search for Darko only to find him killed by a giant, Komodo dragon like lizard. The lizard then proceeds to hunt Petar across the forest, who tries to reach the city by foot.

== Cast ==
- Marin Mandir - Petar
- Goran Kramarić - Darko
- Goran Dujmić - Barmen
- Danijel Galić - Poker-ace

== See also ==
- List of films featuring dinosaurs
- Croatian science fiction
