= Percovich =

Percovich is a surname. Notable people with the surname include:

- John Perkovich (1924–2000), American baseball player
- Leo Percovich, Uruguayan footballer
- Luis Pércovich Roca (1931–2017), Prime Minister of Peru
- Margarita Percovich (born 1941), Uruguayan politician
- Mariana Percovich (born 1963), Uruguayan playwright, teacher, and theater director

== See also ==
- Perković (surname)
