= Dalibor Perković =

Croatian science fiction writer (born 1974)

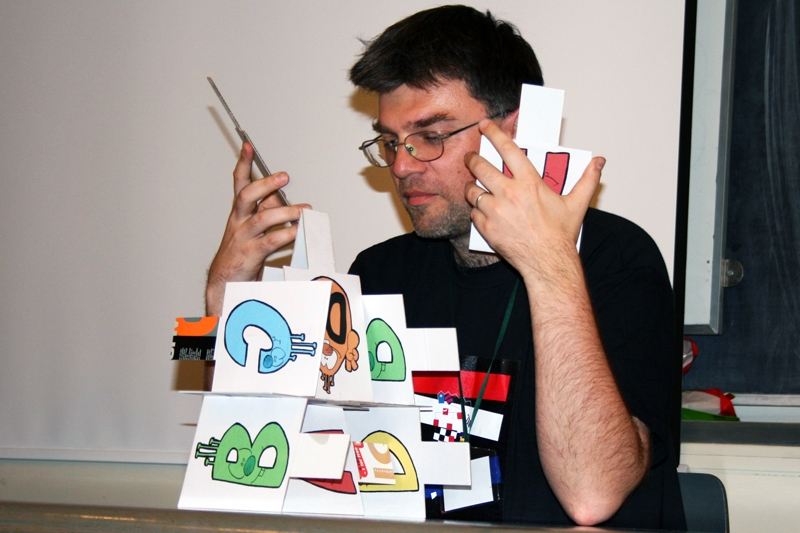
Dalibor Perković

Dalibor Perković (born 1974) is a Croatian science fiction writer. He worked as a journalist and a physics school teacher. He received his PhD in cosmology in 2022.

== Biography ==
Born in Mali Lošinj, Perković now lives in Sesvete, Zagreb. Near the end of the 1990s he was a member of the Studentski list editorial staff and was a co-founder of another student newspaper, the SL Revolt. He started working for the at-the-time opposition daily Novi list in 1998. He left journalism and returned to college in 2002. He graduated with a degree in physics in 2005 and now works as a teacher.

Perković has published a collection of science fiction stories and two novels. He received SFERA Awards for the best Croatian science fiction novellas in the previous year (Banijska praskozorja awarded in 2000 and Preko rijeke, awarded in 2004) and one for the best novel (Sva krv čovječanstva, awarded in 2006). He was a long-term editor of the SFeraKon Bulletin. As of 2023 he is a co-editor-in-chief or Parsek, SFera's official fanzine.

In 2012 he was a co-founder and the first president of "Nastavnici organizirano" ("Teachers Organised"), a non-government organisation whose aim is the development of the Croatian education system.

In 2020, as a part of the Croatian national team, he won a bronze medal on World Trail Orienteering Championship in Trondheim, Norway.

He received his PhD in 2022 from University of Zagreb, Faculty of Science.
