= Krešimir Mišak =

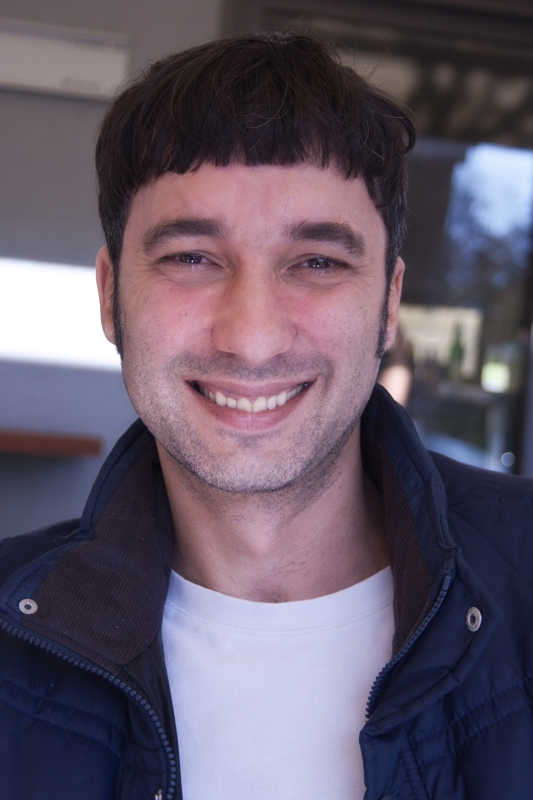
Krešimir Mišak 2013

Krešimir Mišak (pronounced [krěʃimir mǐʃak]; born 1972) is a Croatian journalist, rock musician, and science fiction author.

Mišak is a noted proponent of pseudohistory and various global conspiracy theories in Croatia.

== Education ==
He has graduated journalism at Faculty of Political Science at the University of Zagreb in 1996.

== Career ==
Mišak has published journalistic works, music and fiction.

=== Journalist ===
Since 1988 he has been working in educational shows of the Croatian Radio. He is most famous for his talk show Na rubu znanosti (On the edge of science) that discusses paranormal and fringe scientific topics, which he hosts on Croatian Television since 2002.

He also occasionally writes for magazines Zabavnik, Drvo znanja, Modra lasta, Svjetlost, Nexus and Vizionar. His popular science book Telepatija i telekineza (Telepathy and Telekinesis) has been published in 2006.

=== Musician ===
He has held his first concert in KSET in 1988. Since then, he has recorded six albums with four different bands: Fantomi, Fantomi2, Građani and Virusi. He is currently the frontman of the rock band Hakuna Matata.

=== Writer ===
Since 1999, he has published a dozen of science fiction short stories, most of them in Futura magazine and Annual collections of Croatian science fiction. He has won SFera Award in the category novelette twice - for Svijet iduće sekunde in 2000, and for Akvarij sa zlatnim ribicama in 2005. Svijet iduće sekunde was republished in Ad Astra - Anthology of Croatian science fiction short stories 1976-2006. Zvjezdani riffovi, collection of his short stories, was published in 2005.

=== Criticism ===
Mišak has been a target of Croatian academia and media for promoting misinformation and pseudoscientific theories regarding global warming denial, New World order, alternative history and ufology. Academia in particular disregard his theories as "dangerous" and "blatant nonsense". He does not have any formal education on those matters.

== See also ==
- Croatian science fiction
