= Sphering =

Sphering may refer to:

- The process of becoming a sphere
- Sphering, the recreation or sport of rolling downhill inside an orb, generally made of transparent plastic
- Sphering Group, manufacture and distribution of flue and chimney systems
- Sphering transformation, a decorrelation method that converts a covariance matrix of a set of samples into an identity matrix

== See also ==
- Sphere (disambiguation)
