= Zoran Krušvar =

Croatian writer (born 1977)

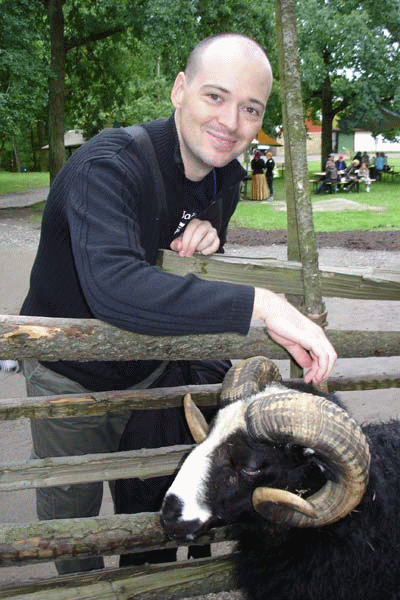
Zoran Krušvar in 2008

Zoran Krušvar is a Croatian psychologist and science fiction and fantasy writer, born on April 9, 1977, in Rijeka. He won 4 SFERA awards, in 2002 (for Igra), in 2003 (for Brodovi u tami), in 2007 (for Izvršitelji nauma Gospodnjeg) and in 2008 (for Tako biti mora) from the Zagreb-based science fiction society SFera.

Krušvar's first novel, Izvršitelji nauma Gospodnjeg, was a multimedia project, first of such kind in Croatia. DVD distributed with the book contains music video soundtrack to the novel, and the trailer for the book was released on YouTube a month before its publishing. At the presentation of the novel on April 22, 2007, a group of young people acted out a ritual sacrifice of a young maiden in order to propitiate God, so the novel would sell better.

== Bibliography ==
- Najbolji na svijetu (2004, Mentor; 2006, Biblioteka SFera)
- Izvršitelji nauma Gospodnjeg (2007, Mentor)
- Zvijeri plišane (2008, Knjiga u centru)
- Kamov se vraća kući. (2010, Mentor)
