= Aleksandar Žiljak =

Croatian science fiction writer and illustrator (born 1963)

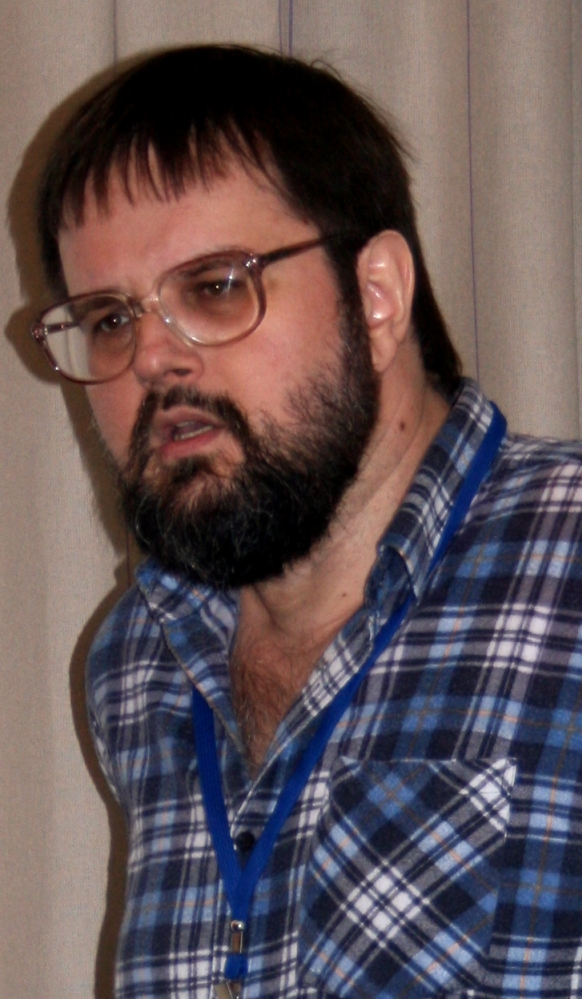
Aleksandar Žiljak

Aleksandar Žiljak (born 19 June 1963) is a science fiction and fantasy writer and illustrator from Zagreb, Croatia. In 2006, he co-edited Ad Astra, an anthology of Croatian SF stories, which covers period from 1976 to 2006, and he co-edits Croatian literary SF journal Ubiq.

Žiljak is the winner of five SFERA Awards, three for Best Story and two for Best Illustration. His story "An Evening In The City Coffeehouse, With Lydia On My Mind" was included in The Apex Book of World SF (2009).

== See also ==
- Science fiction in Croatia
