= Science in science fiction =

Science in science fiction is the study of how science is portrayed in works of science fiction, including novels, stories, and films. It covers a wide range of topics. Hard science fiction is based on engineering or the "hard" sciences (for example, physics, astronomy, or chemistry). Soft science fiction is based on the "soft" sciences, and especially the social sciences (anthropology, sociology, psychology, or political science).

The accuracy of the science portrayed spans a wide range—sometimes it is an extrapolation of existing technology, sometimes it is a realistic or plausible portrayal of a technology that does not exist, but which is plausible from a scientific perspective, and sometimes it is simply a plot device that looks scientific, but has no basis in science. Examples are:

- Realistic case: In 1944, the science fiction story Deadline by Cleve Cartmill depicted the atomic bomb. This technology was real, but was unknown to the author.
- Extrapolation: Arthur C. Clarke wrote about space elevators, basically a long cable extending from the Earth's surface to geosynchronous orbit. While we cannot build one today, it violates no physical principles.
- Plot device: The classic example of an unsupported plot device is faster-than-light drive, often called a "warp drive". It is unsupported by physics as we know it, but needed for galaxy-wide plots with human lifespans.

Criticism and commentary on how science is portrayed in science fiction is done by academics from science, literature, film studies, and other disciplines; by literary critics and film critics; and by science fiction writers, sci-fi fans, and bloggers.

== Hard science in science fiction ==
- Planets in science fiction
- Time travel in science fiction
- Weapons in science fiction
- Materials science in science fiction
- Genetics in fiction

== Social science in science fiction ==
- Sex and sexuality in speculative fiction
- Women in science fiction
- Gender in speculative fiction
- Reproduction and pregnancy in speculative fiction

== See also ==
- Category Fiction about physics
- Physics and Star Wars

== Bibliography ==
- The Science in Science Fiction by Brian Stableford, David Langford, & Peter Nicholls (1982)
