= Futura (magazine) =

Discontinued science fiction magazine in Croatia

Futura, Croatian journal of speculative fiction, was a science fiction magazine. It was in circulation between 1992 and 2010.

== History and profile ==
Futura was first published in October 1992. The magazine was started by Bakal doo, a graphic design and publishing company from Zagreb, as the unofficial successor of Sirius, which was published from April 1976 to December 1989. Initially published only by the authors, but with the arrival of a new editor, Krsto A. Mažuranić, editorial policy is changed. In almost every issue one or two stories of local authors appeared, which contributed to the development of a new generation of Croatian SF writers mid-90s, among which the most significant ones were Marina Jadrejčić, Tatjana Jambrišak, Darko Macan and Aleksandar Žiljak.

During 2000 and 2001, Futura ceased to hold mainly regular monthly publication rhythm, and starting with the number 94, in the July 2001 the company Strip-Agent Ltd. from Zagreb overtook issuing of Futura. The magazine was published regularly until 2004, but in 2005 only six numbers were published. In 2006 only three issues were published, and in 2007 only one issue appeared. Futura was suspended with the December 2010 issue (#131).

Editors:

- Vlatko Jurić-Kokić (from the 1st to the 5th issue)
- Krsto A. Mažuranić (from 6th to 53rd issue)
- Mihaela Velina (from 31st to 93rd issue)
- Davorin Horak (from 94th to 116th issue)
- Milena Benini (from the 117 issue)
