= Materials science in science fiction =

Materials science in science fiction is the study of how materials science is portrayed in works of science fiction. The accuracy of the materials science portrayed spans a wide range – sometimes it is an extrapolation of existing technology, sometimes it is a physically realistic portrayal of a far-out technology, and sometimes it is simply a plot device that looks scientific, but has no basis in science. Examples are:

- Realistic: In 1944, the science fiction story "Deadline" by Cleve Cartmill depicted the atomic bomb. The properties of various radioactive isotopes are critical to the proposed device, and the plot. This technology was real, unknown to the author.
- Extrapolation: In the 1979 novel The Fountains of Paradise, Arthur C. Clarke wrote about space elevators – basically long cables extending from the Earth's surface to geosynchronous orbit. These require a material with enormous tensile strength and light weight. Carbon nanotubes are strong enough in theory, so the idea is plausible; while one cannot be built today, it violates no physical principles.
- Plot device: An example of an unsupported plot device is scrith, the material used to construct Ringworld, in the novels by Larry Niven. Scrith has unreasonable strength, and is unsupported by known physics, but needed for the plot.

Critical analysis of materials science in science fiction falls into the same general categories. The predictive aspects are emphasized, for example, in the motto of the Georgia Tech's department of materials science and engineering – Materials scientists lead the way in turning yesterday's science fiction into tomorrow's reality. This is also the theme of many technical articles, such as Material By Design: Future Science or Science Fiction?, found in IEEE Spectrum, the flagship magazine of the Institute of Electrical and Electronics Engineers.

On the other hand, there is criticism of the unrealistic materials science used in science fiction. In the professional materials science journal JOM, for example, there are articles such as The (Mostly Improbable) Materials Science and Engineering of the Star Wars Universe and Personification: The Materials Science and Engineering of Humanoid Robots.

== Examples ==
In many cases, the materials science aspect of a fictional work was interesting enough that someone other than the author has remarked on it. Here are some examples, and their relationship to real world materials science usage, if any.

Name	Source	Uses	Related real use
Aluminium	Star Trek	In the 1986 film Star Trek IV: The Voyage Home, Scotty gives instructions for the creation of the fictional material transparent aluminum.	Sapphire, an aluminium oxide (Al_{2}O_{3}), is transparent, and used as window material in some scientific applications. In real life, scientists have announced a ceramic, aluminium oxynitride (trade name Alon) which is as strong as steel, but transparent.
Beryllium	Galaxy Quest, The Shadow	The starship NSEA Protector is powered by large spheres of beryllium. Also, beryllium is needed for the creation of a bomb and found by investigating the metal components of a supposed "beryllium coin" in The Shadow (1994). Critics have noted this similarity.	Beryllium's use in these fictional applications may arise from its actual use in some types of nuclear bombs.
Calcium carbonate	Stargate SG-1	When made in suitable rocks such as calcium carbonate oxygen is produced as a by-product during the formation of Crystal tunnels by the Tokra allowing time to set up life support.	There is serious work in extracting oxygen from moon rocks for life support and propulsion. NASA has sponsored a prize (MoonROx) for the first working prototype, and at least one has been built.
Cobalt	Apocalyptic fiction such as The Moon is Green, "Exhibit Piece", and On the Beach.	The 5.27-year half-life of ^{60}Co is short enough to produce intense radiation, but long enough for it to disperse world-wide, and impractical to wait in shelters for it to decay. This combination of properties makes a cobalt bomb an excellent doomsday weapon.	The science here is realistic. Fortunately, cobalt bombs have remained in the domain of science fiction.
Copper and Copper(II) sulfate	The Skylark of Space series by Edward E. "Doc" Smith	In these stories, copper is used as spaceship fuel, being catalyzed by 'element X' directly into energy. When the ship's supply of copper is exhausted, it is able to refuel and return home by visiting the Green System, which has oceans containing copper sulfate.	Copper is indeed used in rocket engines, but for its high thermal conductivity, not as a power source.
Dilithium	Star Trek	Dilithium is fictionally used as shorthand for an extremely complex and hard crystal structure (2(5)6 dilithium 2(:)l diallosilicate 1:9:1 heptoferranide), which occurs naturally on some planets. When placed in a high-frequency electromagnetic field, magnetic eddies are induced in its structure which keep charged particles away from the crystal lattice. This prevents it from reacting with antimatter when so energized, because the antimatter atoms never actually touch it. Therefore, it is used to contain and regulate the annihilation reaction of matter and antimatter in a starship's warp core, which otherwise would explode from the uncontrolled annihilation reaction. Though low-quality artificial crystals can be grown or replicated, they are limited in the power of the reaction they can regulate without fragmenting, and so are largely unsuitable for warp drive applications. Due to the need for natural dilithium crystals for interstellar travel, deposits of this material are a highly contested resource, and as such dilithium crystals have led to more interstellar conflict than all other reasons combined.	In reality, dilithium describes a diatomic gas.
Duralumin	various	The Marvel Comics character Captain America wears lightweight duralumin mail beneath his costume for added protection. A duralumin briefcase was featured in the game Resident Evil: Code Veronica. Two feature in Danganronpa 2: Goodbye Despair. Duralumin is one of many metals used for magic in the Mistborn series.	Duralumin is an early aluminium alloy with unexceptional properties by modern standards. Other metals such as titanium are much stronger and about the same weight.
Einsteinium	The Tashkent Crisis	In William Craig's Cold War novel, einsteinium-119 is used to build a nuclear warhead into the casing of a Colt .45 pistol.	This element has isotopes with low critical masses. Values as low as 32 grams have been reported in the literature. However, an isotope of einsteinium with an atomic weight of 119 is unrealistic – real-life mass numbers range from 245 to 257.
Carbon, as Fullerenes and Carbon nanotubes	The Fountains of Paradise, many others	See fullerenes in popular culture.	In real life, fullerenes and nanotubes have various mechanical, electrical, and thermal properties. See, for example Potential applications of carbon nanotubes.
Hard water	The Flash comics	Electrically charged hard water was originally the item that gave the first Flash (Jay Garrick) his superhuman speed. Critics and even the comic's authors realized this was unlikely, and Garrick's origin was retconned to involve heavy water instead.	Heavy water, or water made with deuterium, has some high-tech uses, including use as a moderator in nuclear reactors. Hard water, on the other hand, is simply water that contains many dissolved minerals.
Helium-3	films Moon and Iron Sky, video game Anno 2205, novels Luna: New Moon, Morning Star, Red Rising, and others.	Several science fiction works have featured helium-3 extraction on the Moon, including Moon, Iron Sky, Anno 2205, and Luna: New Moon. Morning Star features helium-3 mining on Phobos (a moon of Mars), while the novel Red Rising features helium-3 extraction from Mars itself. The helium-3 is valuable since it can be used to power fusion.	Materials on the Moon's surface contain helium-3 at concentrations on the order of between 1.4 and 15 ppb in sunlit areas, and may contain concentrations as much as 50 ppb in permanently shadowed regions. A number of people, starting with Gerald Kulcinski in 1986, have proposed to mine lunar regolith.
Hydrogen-4	The Mouse That Roared	This isotope of hydrogen is called Quadium and powers a thermonuclear doomsday device called the Q-bomb, which is captured by the Duchy of Grand Fenwick.	Hydrogen-4 really exists, but is unstable with a lifetime of about 2 x 10^{−22} seconds. The other more stable isotopes of hydrogen, deuterium and tritium, are used in hydrogen bombs.
Ice-nine	Cat's Cradle	Ice-nine is a fictional alternative structure of water that is solid at room temperature and acts as a seed crystal upon contact with ordinary liquid water, causing that liquid water to instantly freeze and transform into more ice-nine. In the book, ice-nine is considered to be a doomsday weapon, due to the possibility of introducing ice-nine into a large body of water (such as a lake or ocean), thus causing that body of water to become solid.	Ice IX is real, as is Ice-I through Ice-XIV. However, Ice IX is only stable at below ambient temperatures and high pressure. The behavior of ice-nine in the book probably comes from the fact that pure water can be supercooled, that is, cooled below the freezing temperature, while remaining liquid, until an impurity or seed crystal is introduced, which causes the water to solidify. It was not inspired by the real Ice-IX, which was only discovered 5 years after the book was published.
Lead	DC Universe	Superman's X-ray vision is unable to penetrate lead. Additionally, kryptonite radiation can be blocked by lead. Daxamites are highly susceptible to lead poisoning, with lead acting akin to kryptonite on Kryptonians.	X-rays are strongly attenuated, though not completely blocked, by lead. Lead poisoning is a very real effect.
Lysine	Jurassic Park	In the film Jurassic Park, the dinosaurs have their DNA modified so that they cannot produce lysine and must be supplied with it by the park's feeding system; otherwise they will eventually die. This is a security measure to prevent the creatures from spreading if they ever escape into the outside world. In the book, the dinosaurs escape and survive by eating things rich in lysine such as soybeans and lentils.	Real-life biological experiments use this mechanism. However, lysine is a poor choice since most modern animals (including humans) cannot synthesize it either, but thrive by including it in their diet.
Moscovium ("Element 115")	urban myths, UFO conspiracy theory culture, Dark Reign, X-COM series, others	In the world of UFO conspiracy theory culture during the 1980s and 1990s, Bob Lazar asserted that moscovium functioned as a gravity wave generator for UFOs, being "stepped up" (excited) to livermorium by proton bombardment, and that livermorium's decay products would include gravitons, or "a pure gravity wave" (no quantification of the gravitic field). In the X-COM series, in reference to this kind of UFO theory, "element 115" is known as elerium-115 or just elerium. A stable isotope of "element 115" occurs in the game Dark Reign. A stable isotope of "Element 115" powers the "Back Step" time machine system in the American television series Seven Days. An accidental environmental contamination once caused a large number of congenital disorders. Element 115 is featured in the Call of Duty: Black Ops subseries in the 'Zombies' PVE-style game mode, where it is called Divinium. In the game, Divinium is used for multiple purposes, such as powering weapons, teleporters, liquid drinks known as "Perk-a-Colas", special gumballs known as "Gobblegum", and even creating the zombies themselves. In Tomb Raider III, "Element 115" is one of the four pieces of meteorite rock acquired by Lara Croft during the course of the game. The element can shoot powerful turquoise blasts, and can also be used to speed up and alter evolution. In the 2016 tenth season of the television show The X-Files, the episode "My Struggle" features a triangular, levitating aircraft built from alien technology. When Fox Mulder asks a scientist how the aircraft could turn invisible, the scientist states "Element 115: Ununpentium", apparently obtained from the alien spacecraft crash site at Roswell, New Mexico in 1947.	There is considerable scientific speculation about the possibility of stable elements in the island of stability. However, moscovium has been produced by two different groups and is highly unstable. It alpha-decays in less than a second to nihonium, element 113.
Neutronium	various (see this list, for example)	An extremely dense material made entirely of neutrons, it is theorized to be the main constituent of neutron stars, held together by its own gravity. Authors build space ships out of it and attribute to it various desirable qualities as armor, structural material, etc. Under the immense pressure in the neutron star, the atoms at the surface form a material about 10^{13} times as dense as iron and at least 10^{10} times as strong as steel and which might be incorporated into a composite material in the same way as nanotubes.	Neutronium is actually expected to decompose messily at any reasonable pressure.
Perfluoropropyl furan (oxygenated perfluorocarbon for liquid breathing)	The Abyss	A mysterious breathable liquid is used as the oxygen-carrying atmosphere in a deep-sea diving suit. A real lab rat is "drowned" in a beaker of the liquid, but overcoming initial panic, swims around quite happily. Critics have noted this as an example of an implausible science fiction effect that is really possible.	Though applications for humans are limited to artificial respiration systems (e.g. LiquiVent), mice have survived prolonged submersions in liquid fluorocarbons in which the solubility of oxygen is high. When the animal is returned to dry land, the liquid vaporizes from its lungs and it can again breathe air.
Polonium	various	In Sold to Satan by Mark Twain, Satan's body of radium is cloaked in a protective skin of polonium.	Polonium makes a poor protective coating – at just above room temperature, it evaporates into air in a short time.
Rhodium	Jack Williamson's The Humanoids	Rhodium and metals next to it in the periodic table can be used to harness "rhodomagnetism", a force similar to electromagnetism. This force has truly spectacular properties – it propagates instantaneously, can fission any heavy element, and deforms the space-time continuum, enabling faster-than-light communication and travel. Rhodomagnetism is also mentioned in passing in Fredric Brown's What Mad Universe. However, this has been derided by critics as "sheerest gobbledygook".	Rhodium is a member of the platinum group of metals, which has useful but not spectacular properties.
Room-temperature superconductors	Ringworld and many others	In science fiction, superconductors that operate at ambient temperature and pressure are used to levitate massive objects without use of power, and revolutionize many technologies, among them power transmission and energy storage.	The idea is not absurd; room temperature superconductivity has been achieved at high pressure, and possible routes to more practical efforts are under investigation. Indeed, room-temperature superconductivity has been reported, though no such reports have been confirmed. It is difficult to state categorically that low pressure, room-temperature superconductivity is impossible, since there is currently no theory that explains how high-temperature superconductors (which still require cooling much below room temperature) work.
Selenium	Ghostbusters, Evolution, I, Robot, Lexx	In the film Ghostbusters, the site of the climactic final battle against Gozer takes place on the Ivo Shandor building, which is stated as being "cold-riveted girders, with cores of pure selenium". The building is used as an antenna to draw in surrounding psychokinetic energy and summon Gozer. The protagonists of the film Evolution use hundreds of gallons of Head & Shoulders shampoo, which they say contains selenium, to defeat the titular alien menace. Critics have noted the method of picking selenium as a poison is less than scientific. In the book I, Robot, in the story "Runaround", selenium is used on Mercury to generate power, and to protect Gregory Powell and Michael Donovan from the heat of the sun. In the Lexx episode "Twilight", Stanley Tweedle becomes ill due to selenium deficiency. He is eventually cured with a dose of dandruff shampoo.	Selenium is used with bismuth in brasses to replace more toxic lead. There is no reported use in girders. Head & Shoulders shampoo actually uses a zinc-based active ingredient, while Selsun Blue, Extra Strength Head & Shoulders, and many other brands of anti-dandruff shampoo contain selenium sulfide. Photo-sensitivity of selenium was discovered in the 19th century. It is really used in some types of photocells, but many alternatives are available today.
Strontium	The Bionic Woman, Strontium Dog, Fallout 3, Island of Terror, Flipnote	In an episode of The Bionic Woman, Jamie Summers battles a computerized complex bent on destruction. Although it does not contain a real bomb, it is to be destroyed by a military strontium bomb. The bounty hunting mutants of Strontium Dog attribute their deformities and freakish powers to strontium-90 contained in the fallout of atomic wars. In the video game Fallout 3, one of the consumable items is called the "Nuka-Cola Quantum", which supposedly gets its unique properties from the addition of strontium-90 in its formula. In Island of Terror, the bone-eating monsters appear to be unstoppable until doctors discover that strontium-90 is deadly to them. Strontium-90 appears in the Flipnote video "swimming pool", where an unsuspecting stickman is informed that the pool he is in is filled with strontium-90.	A dirty bomb containing strontium-90 is a potential terrorist weapon.
Thallium	Protector and other Larry Niven works set in Known Space	In these works, humans are derived from another race, in which human-like beings are the juvenile form of a smarter and tougher adult, the Pak Protector. The transformation between the forms is triggered by a virus. These beings establish an Earth colony, but the virus requires significant amounts of thallium oxide in the environment. Since the Earth does not have enough thallium, the virus dies out, and humans then evolved from the juvenile form. Critics have noted this cannot explain the similarity of DNA in humans and much older life forms on Earth.	Niven's use is plausible, but fictional. The same effect occurs in vitamin deficiency.
Thorium	Robert A. Heinlein's novels, Star Wars, others	Robert A. Heinlein envisioned thorium as being a spacecraft fuel of the near future Earth shown in Rocket Ship Galileo and Have Space Suit—Will Travel, and of the more advanced space-traveling civilization described in his novel Citizen of the Galaxy. This use is also seen in the Master of Orion series of video games. Thorium is also used as a highly explosive material in the game Star Wars: Knights of the Old Republic II. A Soviet doomsday device in Stanley Kubrick's film Dr. Strangelove employs "Cobalt Thorium G". In World of Warcraft, thorium is a workable metal mined from rock deposits that are greenish in color. The DSiWare game Thorium Wars envisions a future "era of peace and prosperity" powered by thorium which is shattered when "Thorions—a super species of Thorium-based machines" turn against mankind.	Thorium can be used in nuclear reactors, and is much more abundant than uranium. This technology has been tested at a large scale in reactors such as the THTR-300.
Tin foil	various conspiracy theorists, Signs	Supposedly, one can protect oneself against mind-control rays (government, alien, corporation, etc.) by wearing a tin-foil hat. In the film Up, Up and Away, tin foil acts as kryptonite for the superheroes. In current times, the material known as tin foil is made of aluminium, not tin. This matters little for the intended use since both are conductive and ductile metals.	Tin foil, or any conductive metal, can block electromagnetic waves (see Faraday cage). However, the effectiveness of the tin foil hat as electromagnetic shielding for stopping radio waves is greatly reduced by it not being a complete enclosure. Measurements of various tin foil hat designs indicate relatively little attenuation, and even enhanced response at some frequencies.
Zinc	Protector (novel) and other works by Larry Niven set in Known Space	Crystal zinc is the material from which fusion drive tubes are made. It is not explained what property of zinc is utilized, or why zinc is the best material for this application.	There are some nuclear interactions that only happen in crystalline materials. For example, the Mössbauer effect, affecting gamma ray absorption and emission, has been observed in zinc crystals.

== See also ==
- Science in science fiction
- Hypothetical types of biochemistry. Most of these potential types of biochemistry have been used in science fiction.
- Unobtainium
- List of fictional elements, materials, isotopes and atomic particles
- Category:Fictional materials
- Category:Fiction about physics
