= SFera =

Croatian science fiction society

SFera is a science fiction society from Zagreb, Croatia. It was founded in 1976, thus marking the beginnings of organized science fiction fandom in the region.

SFera is the official organizer of SFeraKon, an annual Croatian science fiction convention. Since 1995, it also publishes annual collections of science fiction stories of Croatian authors. The founder of the collection series and its first editor was Darko Macan. SFera's own fanzine, Parsek, has been published since 1977.

Although Croatia today has a number of science fiction societies and conventions, as well the annual short fiction anthologies, SFera remains the major national society. Since mid-1970s, its members and founders - among them Krsto A. Mažuranić, Damir Mikuličić, Neven Antičević, Ivica Posavec - were included in organisation of almost every major initiative in Croatian science fiction, including the Sirius monthly magazine (awarded two times as the best European science fiction magazine, in 1980 and 1984), which was founded and partially edited by SFera's members, then the Futura magazine, which was edited by Krsto A. Mažuranić, and also various attempts at local science fiction publishing, as well many fandom activities. Today, when it's not a publisher or an organiser, SFera remains the patron or initiator of various science fiction activities in Croatia, especially small press publishing as science fiction literary journal Ubiq, the series of books by winners of the SFERA Award (Biblioteka SFERA), or the anthology of the Croatian science fiction stories 1976-2006 Ad Astra. The major Croatian science fiction portal (and its online fanzine) NOSF is also run by the SFera members.

== SFERA Award ==
Introduced in 1981, the SFERA Award is the only national award for the SF genre in Croatia. Until 1991, the award was given for the area of the whole former Yugoslavia and its recipients were, among others, World Fantasy Award winner Zoran Živković, for his two-tome Encyclopedia of Science Fiction, Predrag Raos, Darko Macan, Igor Kordej, Darko Suvin, and Aleksandar Žiljak.

== SFeraKon ==
The annual Croatian science fiction convention, SFeraKon, is held in Zagreb since 1979. It's the longest-running and the biggest annual science fiction convention in South-Eastern Europe, usually attended by more than 2000 people. SFeraKon was initiated by the First Exhibition of Science Fiction (Prvi sajam naučne fantastike), held in Zagreb and Belgrade in 1972, organised by the Zagreb student gallery SC, the American Library of Zagreb, and the Belgrade Student Cultural Centre (SKC).

In 1986, SFeraKon was actually held as the Eurocon convention under the name Ballcon. The 1992 Eurocon was also meant to be held in Zagreb, but the venue was changed to Freudenstadt, Germany, because of the war. The 1998 SFeraKon was also the 1998 Euroconference. And finally, 2012 SFeraKon was held as Eurocon convention under the name Kontakt.

The guests of the convention, among others, were Frederik Pohl, Jack Williamson, Harry Harrison, Joe Haldeman, Brian W. Aldiss, James Gunn, Bob Shaw, Richard D. Nolan, Sam Lundwall, Paolo Eleuteri Serpieri, Gianfranco Viviani, Gerald Webb, Martin Easterbrook, Robert Silverberg, Karen Haber, Guy Gavriel Kay, Walter Jon Williams, Lois McMaster Bujold, George R. R. Martin, Ken MacLeod, Michael Iwoleit, Michael Swanwick, Bruce Sterling, Richard K. Morgan, Ian McDonald and R. Scott Bakker.

== See also ==
- Science fiction in Croatia
