= Igor Kordej =

Croatian comic artist

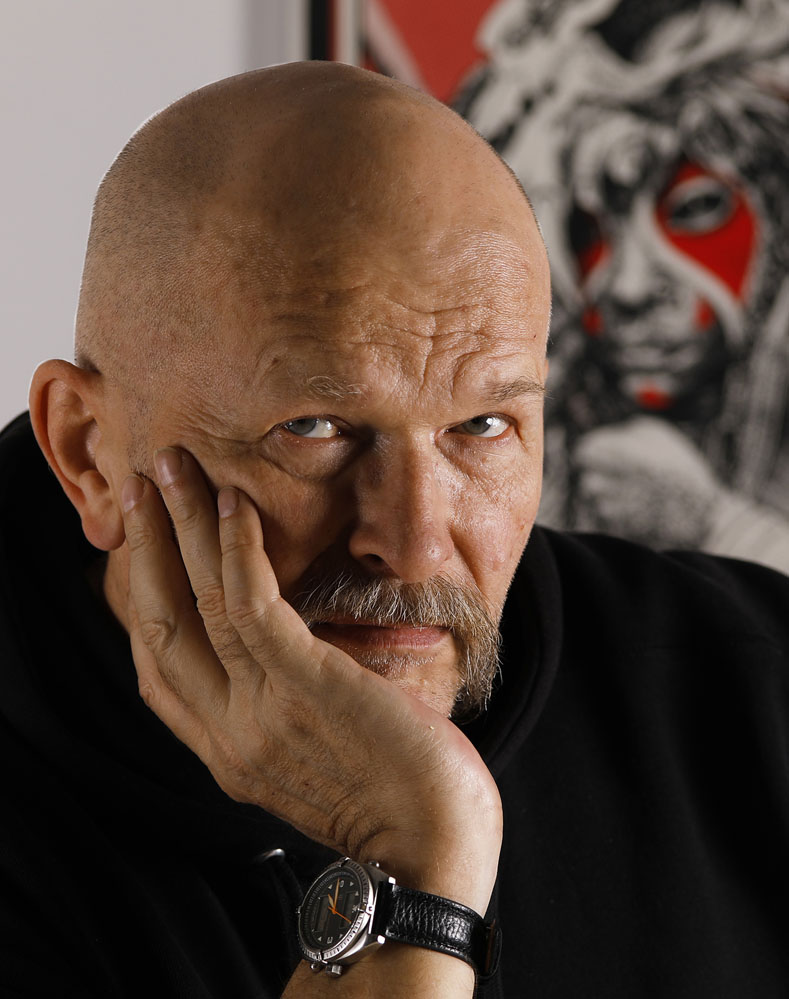
- Born: Igor Kordej; 23 June 1957 (age 69) Zagreb, PR Croatia, FPR Yugoslavia
- Areas: Penciller, Inker, Colorist
- Notable works: New X-Men, Soldier X

Igor Kordej (referred to as Igor Kordey in American and French publications; born 23 June 1957) is a Croatian comic book artist, illustrator, graphic designer and scenographer.

== Biography ==
Igor Kordej graduated at ŠPUD (The School of Applied Arts and Design in his native Zagreb), graphic department (1972-1977) and attended, for two years, the Academy of Fine Arts, University of Zagreb, graphic department (1977-1979).

Kordej started as a professional graphic designer when he was 18, and as a professional comic artist and illustrator when he was 19 years old, joining the group of comic artists called Novi kvadrat ("New square") in 1976–1979, and publishing in several Yugoslavian youth magazines of that era. In 1979 Novi kvadrat won the national award 7 sekretara SKOJ-a, thus marking a break-up of the group.

In the early 1980s, Kordej teamed up with Mirko Ilić again in SLS studio (acronym for "Slow, Bad and Expensive"), and focuses on producing album covers and posters for Yugoslavian pop musicians and groups. After the break-up with Ilić he continues with solo career, doing illustration for Yugoslavian mainstream magazines, film and theater posters, logotypes and album covers.

Kordej started a career in European comic market in 1986 (France, Spain, Germany), and since 1989 on the US market, in the magazine Heavy Metal Magazine. His work from that period includes the album Les cinq saisons – Automne, published in 1990 by Dargaud. IT was appointed by the Ministry of Culture in France as a work of significant cultural value and was assigned to all public libraries in France (in 2011 the same album was featured in Paul Gravett's book 1001 Comics You Must Read Before You Die).

Kordej moved from Zagreb to a small Istrian village, Groznjan, in 1988 where he led, as an artist and supervisor, a group of over 20 artists and story writers (among others a young Darko Macan, Edvin Biuković and Goran Sudžuka), as well as veterans Radovan Devlić and Dragan Filipović Fipa, producing comics and design for the German market.

In 1991, he moved to Denmark at the invitation of Semic International company, where he spent almost a year producing comics and illustrations for Malibu Comics. In 1997 he moved to Canada, invited by the company Digital Chameleon to become its creative director. After disputes with management, he left the company after eight months to become a freelancer again.

From 1994 to 1996, Kordej worked for both Marvel Comics and Dark Horse Comics. At Marvel, he worked under editor Marcus McLaurin, when Kordej produced several hand-painted comics for Tales of Marvels series. He returned to Marvel in 2001 when he was invited by editor-in–chief Joe Quesada to work on the series Cable and New X-Men. Shortly after the 9/11 attacks many of Marvel artists produced illustrations inspired by the tragedy. They all went on public auction, with the profits donated to families of fallen rescuers. Kordey's illustration Pennsylvania Plane was bought by The Library of Congress. Because of his speed as an artist, at his peak, Kordej was producing artwork for three or four monthly books at the same time. However, as a result, he has attracted heavy criticism for the quality of his art, especially from the readers.

A few months later, in June 2004, Kordej signed a contract with Editions Delcourt. In two decades of his collaboration with the publisher, he published nearly eighty albums on the francophone market.

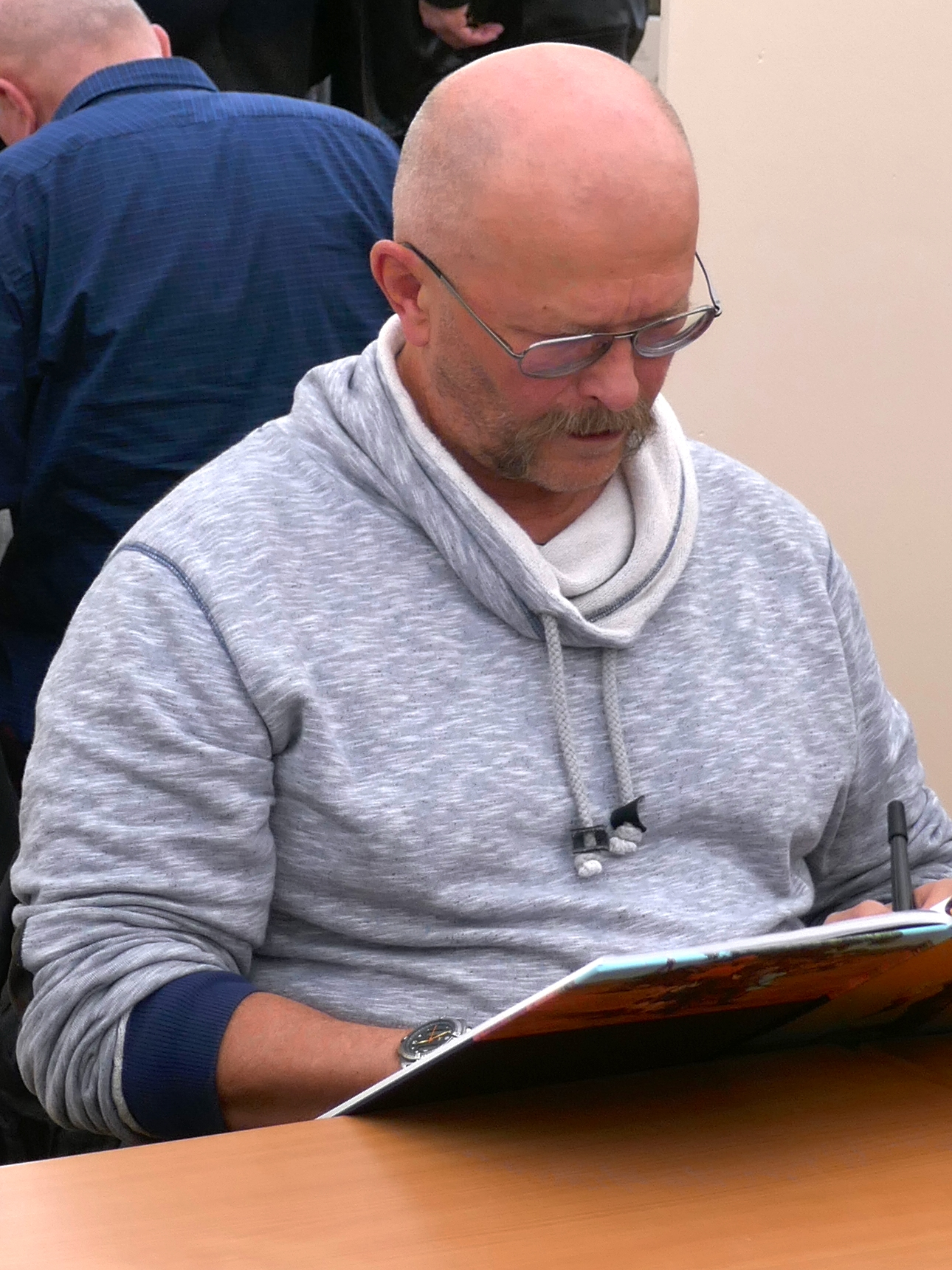
Igor Kordej at Festival de la BD de Buc, 2017.

== Awards and nominations ==
- 1986 Best comic (Zvjezdana prašina), Mladost magazine, Belgrade, Yugoslavia
- 1987 Best comic, SFERA Award, Zagreb, Yugoslavia
- 1995 Best illustration, SFERA Award, Zagreb, Croatia
- 1996 Best color illustration, SFERA Award, Zagreb, Croatia
- 2000 Best artist, voted by fans, Haxtur Award (Batman/Tarzan – The Claws of the Catwoman), Gijón, Spain
- 2005 Best artist, Haxtur Award (X-treme X-Men – Storm: The Arena), Gijón, Spain
- 2006 Best limited series, Eisner and Harvey awards nominations (Smoke), US and Canada
- 2007 Best artist, voted by fans, Reims, France
- 2009 Award for contribution to the comics industry, FraMaFu festival, Virovitica, Croatia
- 2009 Best cover, Glyph Award (Unknown soldier series), Philadelphia, SAD
- 2010 Favourite European comic book, Eagle Award nomination (The Secret History), Bristol, England
- 2010 Voted by fans (Persona mas nocturna), Avilés, Spain
- 2010 Best album design - Fender Mega Music Award (Leiner & Hrnjak: Viša sila), Zagreb, Croatia
- 2011 Best theatre scenography (Čudo u Poskokovoj dragi) with Valentina Crnković, Marulo Award, 21st Festival "Marulić Days", Split, Croatia
- 2013 Chevalier of Order of Arts and Letters, Ministry of Culture, France
- 2013 Honorary member of ULUPUH (Croatian Association of Artists of Applied Arts), Zagreb, Croatia
- 2020 Gold medal - best of show - Rastko Ćirić for The Rubber Soul Project box set, Global Music Awards, La Jolla, California, US. Kordey participated as designer and executive producer.
- 2022 Best artist, European Science Fiction Society, Dudelange, Luxembourg
- 2023 Best album design – PORIN Award (Chui: Zagreb – Berlin), Zagreb, Croatia
- 2024 Best comic, SFERA Award (Texas Kid, My Brother, graphic novel), Zagreb, Croatia
- 2024 Minas Edhel Award for life-time achievement, ZmajKON, Niš, Serbia

== Bibliography ==
=== Interior work ===
- La Saga de Vam Volume 1-3 (with Vladimir Colin, Les Humanoïdes Associés, 1988–1989)
- Heavy Metal Volume 13 #5: "The Wall" (with Mikalacki, anthology, HM Communications, 1989)
- Les Cinq Saisons: L'Automne (with Django Nenad, one-shot, Les Humanoïdes Associés, 1990)
- Tales of the Marvels: Wonder Years #1-2 (with Dan Abnett and Andy Lanning, Marvel, 1995)
- Edgar Rice Burroughs' Tarzan (Dark Horse):
  - A Tale of Mugambi (with Darko Macan, one-shot, 1995)
  - Tarzan/Carson of Venus #1-4 (with Darko Macan, 1998)
  - The Rivers of Blood #1-4 (script and art, with Neven Antičević, 1999–2000)
  - Batman/Tarzan: Claws of the Cat-woman #1-4 (with Ron Marz, 1999–2000)
- A Decade of Dark Horse #1: "Predator 1718" (with Henry Gilroy, Dark Horse, 1996)
- Aliens: Havoc #1 (with Mark Schultz, among other artists, Dark Horse, 1997)
- Myst #1 (of 4) (colours on Doug Wheatley, written by Chris Ulm and Lovern Kindzierski, Dark Horse, 1997)
- Star Wars (Dark Horse):
  - The Protocol Offensive (with Brian Daley, Anthony Daniels and Ryder Windham, graphic novel, 1997)
  - Star Wars Tales #1: "Mara Jade: A Night on the Town" (with Timothy Zahn, anthology, 1999)
  - Chewbacca #1 (of 4) (with Darko Macan and Brent Eric Anderson, 2000)
- Conspiracy #1-2 (with Dan Abnett and Andy Lanning, Marvel, 1998)
- The Incredible Hulk #461: "Self Destruction" (colours on David Brewer, written by Peter David, Marvel, 1998)
- Star Trek: Next Generation — The Gorn Crisis (with Kevin J. Anderson and Rebecca Moesta, graphic novel, Wildstorm, 2001)
- The Brotherhood #3: "Drunk with Powers That Could Destroy the World" (among other artists — inks on Esad Ribić, written by X, Marvel, 2001)
- Cable #97-105, 107 (with David Tischman (#97-104) and Darko Macan (#105 and 107), Marvel, 2001–2002)
- New X-Men #119-120, 124–125, 128-130 (with Grant Morrison, Marvel, 2001–2002)
- Captain America vol. 3 #50: "Relics" (with Brian David-Marshall, co-feature, Marvel, 2002)
- A Moment of Silence: "Sick Day" (with Joe Quesada, anthology one-shot, Marvel, 2002)
- Diosamante #2 (with Alejandro Jodorowsky and Franck Reichert, Les Humanoïdes Associés, 2002)
- Black Widow: Pale Little Spider #1-3 (with Greg Rucka, Marvel MAX, 2002)
- Soldier X #1-8 (with Darko Macan, Marvel, 2002–2003)
- X-Treme X-Men #25-46 (with Chris Claremont, Marvel, 2003–2004)
- Smoke #1-3 (with Alex de Campi, IDW Publishing, 2005)
- L'Histoire secrète Volume 1–2, 6-34, 0, 35 (with Jean-Pierre Pécau, Delcourt, 2005–2019)
- Empire Volume 1-4 (with Jean-Pierre Pécau, Delcourt, 2006–2016)
- Le cœur des batailles Volume 1–2 (with Jean-David Morvan, Delcourt, 2007–2008)
- Taras Boulba Volume 1–2 (with Jean-David Morvan, Delcourt, 2008)
- L'idole et le fléau Volume 1-2 (with L. F. Bollée, 12 bis, 2009–2010)
- Keltos Volume 1–2 (with Jean-Pierre Pécau, Delcourt, 2009–2010)
- Scalped #50: "The Art of Surviving" (with Jason Aaron, among other artists, Vertigo, 2011)
- Jour J Volume 12, 15, 24, 29-31 (with Jean-Pierre Pécau, Fred Blanchard and Fred Duval, Delcourt, 2013–2017)
- Les 30 Deniers Volume 1–5 (with Jean-Pierre Pécau, Delcourt, 2014–2016)
- Nous, les morts Volume 1–4 (with Darko Macan, Delcourt, 2015)
- Marshal Bass #1–10 (with Darko Macan, Delcourt, 2017–2023)
- Colt & Pepper #1-2 (with Darko Macan, Delcourt, 2020–2021)
- Mobius #1–3 (with Jean-Pierre Pécau, Delcourt, 2021–2022)

=== Covers only ===
- The Real Adventures of Jonny Quest #3 (Dark Horse, 1996)
- Predator: Kindred #1-4 (Dark Horse, 1996–1997)
- Predator vs. Judge Dredd #3 (Dark Horse, 1997)
- Classic Star Wars: Han Solo at Stars' End #1 (Dark Horse, 1997)
- Star Wars: Tales of the Jedi — Redemption #1-5 (Dark Horse, 1998)
- Star Wars Special #1 (Dark Horse, 1998)
- Soldier X #9-10 (Marvel, 2003)
- Angel: The Curse #1, 3 (IDW Publishing, 2005)
- Hrvatski Velikani Volume 1 #1, 3 (Astoria, 2007)
- Unknown Soldier vol. 4 #1-6 (Vertigo, 2008–2009)
- Detective Comics #1018 (DC Comics, 2020)
- Basketful of Heads #6, variant cover (DC Comics, 2020)
- 20th Century Men #1 and #6, variant cover (Image, 2022)
