= TBD Science Fiction Story Award =

Only Turkish SciFi award, established 1998

The TBD Science Fiction Story Award (TBD Bilimkurgu Öykü Yarışması) is an award for Turkish science fiction given to the winner of the TBD (Turkish Informatics Association) Science Fiction Story Contest. This is the only institutionalized contest in the area of science fiction story in Turkey since its foundation in 1998. The contest specification is posted every April on www.tbd.org.tr or www.bilisimdergisi.org. The award ceremony is held every autumn during the Information Convention in Ankara, Turkey.

The contest strives to arouse interest in science fiction in young writers with potential, seek answers for “what have we been, what have we become, what will we be?” and raise the number of Works in Turkish science fiction. So as to awaken more interest, TBD also organizes a “guess the winner story” contest. The number of contest participants between 1998-2011 have been over 1500.

== Award Winners and Juries ==
Year	Story Title and Author	Jury	Preliminary Jury
2016	1. ExTube, Kadri Kerem Karanfil; 2. İlk Görev, İsmail Yamanol   3. İhlal, İsmail Yiğit	Atıf Ünaldı, Barış Emre Alkım, Bülent Akkoç, Kadir Yiğit Us, Koray Özer, Murat Başekim, Özgür Tacer, Seda Uyanık, Sedef Özkan, Ümit Dağcı	-
2015	1. Eşçip, Burçin Tetik; 2. Yüz Elli, Tevfik Uyar   3. Tarak, Özgür Tırpan	Murat Başekim, Bülent Akkoç, Barış Emre Alkım, Kadir Yiğit Us, Ümit Dağcı, Cenk Tezcan, Erdal Naneci, Ersin Taşçı	-
2014	1. Suçların En Büyüğü, Murat Mıhçıoğlu; 2. Kullanım Kılavuzu, Funda Özlem Şeran   3. Tosca v2.0, Özgür Hünel	Aysu Erden, Barış Müstecaplıoğlu, Murat Başekim, Bülent Akkoç, Gamze Güller, Hande Baba, Murat Şahin, Ayfer Niğdeli, Zekeriya Babaoğlu, Ersin Taşçı, Erdal Naneci	-
2013	1. Çivi, Sinan İpek; 2. Fırıldak, Tevfik Uyar   3. Oyun Hırsızı, Rukiye Yüce	Sadık Yemni, Aşkın Güngör, Ethem Alpaydın, Mutlu Binark, Bülent Akkoç, Çiğdem Ülker, Suzan Bilgen Özgün, Mürselin Kurt, Nezih Kuleyin	-
2012	1. SOSYAL (ve ilahi) (ko)MEDYA, Murat Başekim; 2. Son Mektup, Tevfik Uyar ve SSSZ, Bülent Özgün   3. Olmak ya da Olmamak, Özgür Hünel ve Çember, Emrah Koçak	Nazlı Eray, Özcan Karabulut, Sibel K. Türker, Sadık Yemni, Meltem Vural, Nezih Kulleyin, Ali Özenci, Koray Özer	-
2011	1. Salyangoz, Murat Başekim; 2. Cennet, Savaş Zafer Şahin   3. Anlam Satan Android, Murat Kaya Beşiroğlu	Hikmet Temel Akarsu, Bülent Akkoç, Zarife Biliz, Irmak Zileli, Murat Batmankaya, Erdem Erkul, M. Ali Özenci, Nezih Kuleyin	-
2010	1. Proxima’ya Son Yolcu, Sinan İpek; 2. Erguvan, Feraye Şahin   3. Genç Robotlar Rahatsız, Taylan Taftaf	Hikmet Temel Akarsu, Bülent Akkoç, Metin Celal, Süreyya Evren, Ergun Kocabıyık, Nezih Kuleyin	Suzan Özgün, Gamze Güller, Asiye Bendon Koray, Ayfer Niğdeli, Yezdan Baban, Oğuz Aslan, Hande Baba, Tuğba Can, Ahmet Doğan, Ayşegül Tercan, Zekeriya Babaoğlu, Koray Özer
2009	1. Yapay Bedenler, Ethem Alpaydın; 2. Uygarlik Batarken, Melsan Tunca İşeri    3. Duy Beni, Mehmet Murat Mıhçıoğlu           Jury's Special Award           Homo Homini Lupus, Birsen Balcı           Logosoloji, Ahmet Özkan	Hikmet Temel Akarsu, Prof.Dr. Talat S. Halman, Semih Gümüş, Bülent Akkoç, Mustafa Küpüşoğlu, Mustafa Kutlay, Necdet Kesmez, Buket Uzuner	Hande Baba, Mürselin Kurt, Onur Evci, Meltem Vural, Arzu Kütük, Ahmet Doğan, Ayfer Niğdelioğlu, Tuğba Can, Koray Özer
2008	1. Doppelganger, Yiğit Kocagöz; 2. Yılan, Barış Çağatay Çakıroğlu   3. Beki’nin Çocukları, Selin Arapkirli        Jury's Special Award       İntihar Emri, Nursel Güler       Kilit, Mehmet Murat Mıhçıoğlu	Hikmet Temel Akarsu, Bülent Akkoç, Doç.Dr.Laurent Mignon, Necdet Kesmez, M.Serdar Kuzuoğlu	Hande Baba, Mürselin Kurt, Güner Arslan, Onur Evci, Meltem Vural, Arzu Kütük, Ayfer Niğdelioğlu, Ahmet Doğan, Eray Karinca, Koray Özer
2007	1. Rahim, Orkun Uçar; 2. Suret, Mert Yanikoğlu   3. Kurgunun Sonu, Mustafa Acungil	Kaan Aslanoğlu, Prof.Dr. Cem Say, Serdar H. Semiz, Necdet Kesmez, Bülent Akkoç	Nejat Eralp Tezcan, Aslı Evren, Koray Özer, Yasemin Altun
2006	1. Define, Serdar Hamdi Semiz; 2. Ölü Gezegen, Ali Öztürk   3. Kişisel Kurgu, Umut Güzel	Orhan Bursalı, Hakan Erdem, Bülent Akkoç, Gökhan Tok, Yasemin Altun	-
2005	1. Beni Ölesiye Sevebilir misin, Akın Başal; 2. Herşeyi Bilen Adam,  Mustafa Coşkun Hepyonar   3. Sonsuza Kadar, Emre Kocaşallı	Zühtü Bayar, Bülent Akkoç, Mehmet Sucu, Kamil Aydınlı, İnci Pekgüleç Apaydın	-
2004	1. Sevgilim Dans Edelim mi, Aşkın Güngör; 2. Hata Kanunları, Akın Başal   3. Kayıp Şehir ve Hafıza,  Alper Sezener	Ünsal Oskay, Zühtü Bayar, Bülent Akkoç, Sönmez Güven, Levent Karadağ	-
2003	1. Bul Beni Bebek, Mehmet Emin Arı; 2. Yeni Başlıyor, Hüseyin Tuğrul Atasoy   3. Hasta Kırık Boynuzlar, Özcan Güler	Zühtü Bayar, Bülent Akkoç, Sönmez Güven, Raşit Çavaş, Necdet Kesmez, Nezih Kuleyin, Hülya Küçükaras	-
2002	1. Gelecekten Gelen Notlar, Beyazıt H. Akman; 2. Arıza, Ümit Yaşar Özkan   3. Dışardakiler, Akın Başal	Zühtü Bayar, Gökhan Tan, Necdet Kesmez, Ali Arifoğlu, Yasemin Altun	-
2001	1. Firar, Müfit Özdeş, 2. Ziusudra’nın Gemisi, Levent H. Şenyürek   3. Anubis’in Çağrısı, Emine Gözen	Zühtü Bayar, Giovanni Scognamillo, Bülent Somay Necdet Kesmez, Gökhan Tok	-
2000	1. Kurbağa, Sarper Özharar; 2. Organik Makineler, Ercan Döver   3. Döngü, Şükran Tunç	Zühtü Bayar, Müfit Özdeş, Prof.Dr.Aydın Köksal, Necdet Kesmez, Sezer Erkin	-
1998	1. Kontrol- Serdar Hamdi Semiz; 2. Mıthradates - K. Mükremin Barut   3. Bonsai - Fusun Altuner Güçlü	Orhan Duru, Prof. Dr.Aydın Köksal, S.Erkin Ergin, Akın Evren, Akdoğan Özkan	-
