= Perković, Croatia =

Perković
- Village
- Location within Croatia
- Coordinates: 43°40′30″N 16°06′25″E
- Country: Croatia
- Region: Dalmatia
- County: Šibenik-Knin County
- City: Šibenik

Area
  - Total: 5.3 km^{2} (2.0 sq mi)
- Elevation: 182 m (597 ft)

Population (2021)
  - Total: 103
  - Density: 19/km^{2} (50/sq mi)
- Time zone: UTC+1 (CET)
  - Summer (DST): UTC+2 (CEST)
- Postal code: 22205
- Area code: 022

Perković is a village in the Šibenik-Knin County, Croatia. The settlement is administered as a part of the city of Šibenik. According to national census of 2011, population of the settlement is 111.

As the place where the Šibenik and Split branches of the Dalmatian Railway meet (with a single line continuing north towards Knin and connecting with the Lika Railway leading to Zagreb), Perković was a well-known transport hub and railway town during most of the 20th century. The importance of the railway and the town has declined significantly since the 1991–1995 war in Croatia.
