= SFeraKon =

Science fiction convention

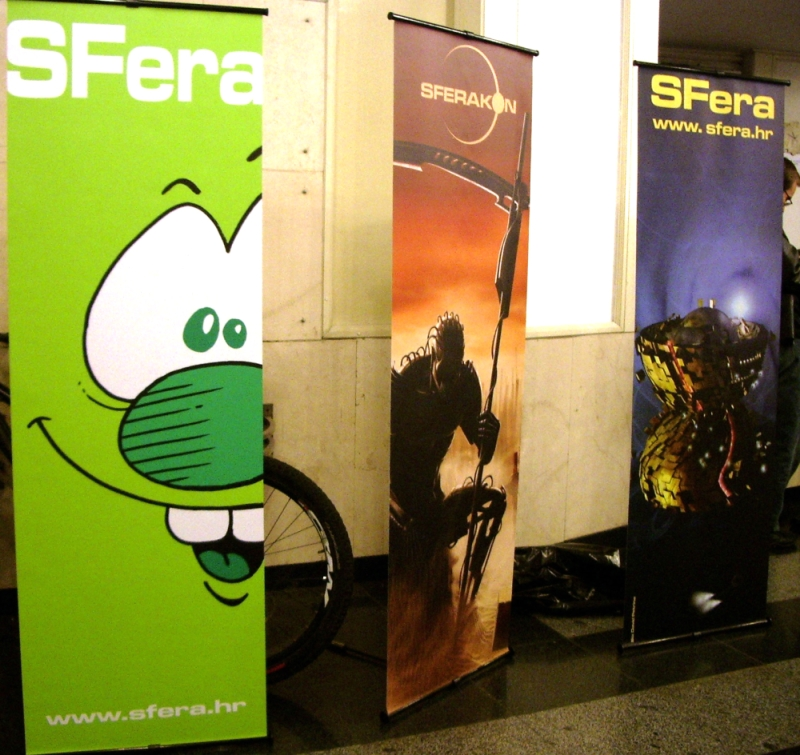
- SFeraKon 2009
- Status: Active
- Genre: Science fiction/Fantasy
- Venue: Faculty of Electrical Engineering and Computing
- Location: Zagreb
- Country: Croatia
- Inaugurated: 1983
- Attendance: c. 2500 (2018)
- Organizer: SFera
- Website: www.sferakon.org

SFeraKon is a science fiction convention that takes place in Zagreb, Croatia every year at the end of April. Organized by SFera, it is the largest and the longest running science fiction convention in southeastern Europe.

The first SFeraKon under that name was held in 1983, continuing the tradition of "science fiction days in Zagreb" after Yukon, the Yugoslav national science fiction convention, started taking place in other towns, the first few having taken place in Zagreb. Since 1994 it is being held on the grounds of Faculty of Electrical Engineering and Computing.

In 1986 SFeraKon hosted a Eurocon, the European Science fiction convention, with Sam Lundwall as a guest of honour. It was nicknamed Ballcon. The 1998 SFeraKon was called a "Euroconference" but was not officially a Eurocon. SFeraKon hosted its second Eurocon in Zagreb in 2012 and two conventions went under the name Kontakt, with more than 300 international members and four guests of honour: Tim Powers, Charles Stross, Dmitry Glukhovsky and Cheryl Morgan.

SFeraKon's many famous guests of honor have included Joe Haldeman, Robert Silverberg (1999), Walter Jon Williams (2001), Lois McMaster Bujold (2002), George R. R. Martin (2003), Ken MacLeod (2004), Michael Swanwick (2006), Bruce Sterling (2007), Richard Morgan (2008), R. Scott Bakker (2009), Ian McDonald (2010), Milena Benini (2010), Dave Lally (2011), Goran Skrobonja (2011), Oto Oltvanji (2011), Darko Tuševljaković (2011), Charles Stross (2012), Tim Powers (2012), Cheryl Morgan (2012), Dmitry Glukhovsky (2012), Danielle Trussoni (2013), Esad Ribić (2013), Chris Beckett (2014), Kate Elliott (2015), James Lovegrove (2017), and Adrian Tchaikovsky (2018).

The 2020 iteration of SFeraKon was postponed due to the COVID-19 pandemic, replaced on the initially announced dates by an online SFeraKoron combined with an assertion, "Oh, yes… SFeraKon is still on, we moved it to autumn!"
