= Rubber Soul (disambiguation) =

Rubber Soul is a 1965 album by the Beatles.

- Rubber Soul: Special Edition 2026 reissue of the Beatles album

Rubber Soul may also refer to:

- Rubber Soul (group), a South Korean hip hop duo
- Rubber Soul Project, a Serbian band
  - The Rubber Soul Project (album), an album by the band

== See also ==
- Rubber Souldiers, an American band
