= Ida Ćirić =

Serbian illustrator

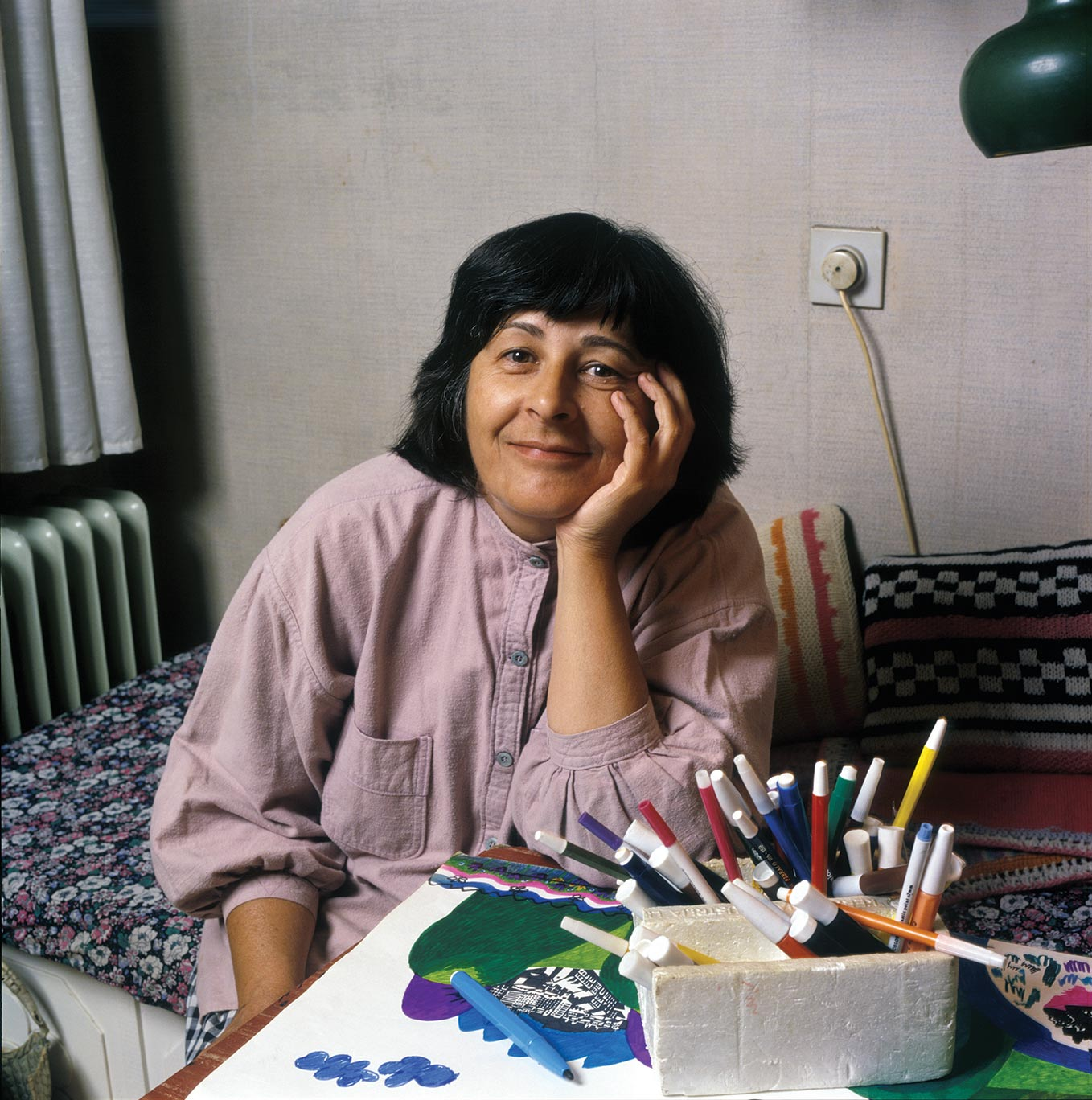
- Ćirić in 1979
- Born: Ivanka Vučković; 3 March 1932; Belgrade, Kingdom of Yugoslavia
- Died: 2007 (aged 74–75); Belgrade, Serbia
- Education: Faculty of Applied Arts, University of Arts, Belgrade
- Known for: Illustration for children

Ivanka "Ida" Ćirić (Serbian Cyrillic: Иванка Ида Ћирић; 3 March 1932 — 2007) was a notable Serbian illustrator for children.

Except for illustration, the fields of her interest were book design, collage and papier-mache objects. She illustrated more than 50 books, and numerous book covers and magazine illustrations. Won 12 important Yugoslav national awards for illustration. Performed six one-man exhibitions.

== Biography ==
Her father Svetislav Vučković (1902–1973) was an engineer and before the 2nd World War one of the leaders of the Slavic "Falcon" gymnastic movement (Serbian: Soko, Czech: Sokol). Mother Slavka (1903–1983) was a professor of gymnastics. Her older brother dr Vladan Vučković (1928–2006) was an engineer, a professor at the Faculty of Electrical Engineering in Belgrade, an excellent pianist and chess problemist, and her younger brother was Dragan Vučković (1930–1998) traffic engineer and multiple Yugoslav champion in rally.

During the studies at the Academy of Applied Arts in Belgrade, she met her future husband Miloš Ćirić (1931–1999), with whom she got two sons, Rastko (b. 1955) and Vukan (b. 1959). It was the beginning of the artistic Ćirić family, today having the third generation of professional art creators.

Upon graduation, Ida and Miloš Ćirić work and exhibit together. Ida specialized in children's illustration, which she will cherish incessantly for the next thirty years, up to the end of the 1980s, marking the whole period with her characteristic stylization of figures and rich color. Art historian Vesna Lakićević Pavićević, the specialist for Serbian illustration, says: "Ida Ćirić, during the four decades, worked as an illustrator and reached the results without which one can not make the real picture about the development of Serbian illustration of the second half of the Twentieth century."

Ida's simplified and optimistic illustrations for children, full of bright colours, raised the generations of children. She had used art techniques as colour markers, coloured inks, which enabled an intensive colour scale and joyful emotive charge. Her black and white illustrations have legible and strong graphism, "which does not fall behind the Miloš's in their energy".

Only on Ida's posthumous retrospective exhibition, at the Museum of Applied Art in Belgrade, in 2009, her rich opus could be overviewed in its diversity of genres, art approaches, techniques.

== Important illustrated books and picture books ==
- A girl outwitted the tzar / Two dimes /Devojka cara nadmudrila / Dva novca/, "Vuk Karadžić", Belgrade, 1964. (in Slovene: Ljubljana, 1964; in German: Berlin, 1968; in Macedonian: Skopje, 1968).
- Devil and his apprentice / A lie for bet /Đavo i njegov šegrt / Laž za opkladu/, "Vuk Karadžić", Belgrade, 1964. (in Croatian, Zagreb, 1964; in German: Berlin, 1968; in Macedonian: Skopje, 1968).
- Baš Čelik, "Vuk Karadžić", Belgrade, 1964. and 1968. (in German: Berlin, 1968; in Macedonian: Skopje, 1968).
- Herzegovian and the Turk /Era i Turčin/, "Vuk Karadžić", Belgrade, 1965. (in Albanian, Slovene and Hungarian: Belgrade, 1967).
- He who knows wins /Ko umije, njemu dvije/, "Vuk Karadžić", Belgrade, 1966.
- The little golden key /Zlatni ključić/ (reader for the first grade of the primary school), Zavod za udžbenike i nastavna sredstva, Belgrade, 1966.
- German fairy tales /Nemačke bajke/, Narodna knjiga, Belgrade, 1967.
- Jovan Jovanović Zmaj, Zmaj's book of poems /Zmajeva pevanija/, Bigz, Belgrade, 1973.
- Branislav Nušić, Haiduks /Hajduci/, Bigz, Belgrade, 1973.
- Momčilo Tešić, Blossom of the childhood /Cvetnik detinjstva/, Bigz, Belgrade, 1975.
- Milena Jovović, An ant's heart /Mravlje srce/, Bigz, Belgrade, 1977.
- Velimir Milošević, Homeland /Domovina/, Prva književna komuna, Mostar, 1978.
- Jovan Jovanović Zmaj, Mice and cats /Miševi i mačke/, Zavod za udžbenike i nastavna sredstva, Belgrade, 1978.
- Branko V. Radičević, Poems about mother /Pesme o majci/, Nolit, Belgrade, 1978.
- Ahmet Hromadžić, A dwarf from a forgotten land /Patuljak iz zaboravljene zemlje/, Nolit, Belgrade, 1978.
- Pocket full of golden verses /Pun džep zlatnih stihova/ (a choice from the world poetry), Nolit, Belgrade, 1978.
- Milenko Ratković, Treasure of the childhood /Blago detinjstva/ (reader for the fourth grade of the primary school), Pokrajinski zavod za izdavanje udžbenika, Novi Sad, 1978.
- Dobrica Erić, Reader of the seasons /Čitanka godišnjih doba/ 1–4, Bigz, Belgrade, 1979.
- Vančo Nikoleski, Small magical packsaddle /Čarobni samarčić/, Nolit, Belgrade, 1986.
- Lewis Carroll, Alice in Wonderland /Alisa u zemlji čuda/, Nolit, Belgrade, 1986.
- Grozdana Olujić, Fairy tales /Bajke/, Nolit, Belgrade, 1987.
- Dragan Lukić, Little and big ones /Mali pa veliki/, Nolit, Belgrade, 1989.

== Magazine design and illustration ==
Zdrav podmladak, 1956–1957 and 1962–1963; Poletarac, 1960; Poletarac (Fledgeling, 1973–1975, edited by Dušan Radović); Pionieri, (Pioneers, edited by Mihal Kiraly) Novi Sad, 1985–1986; Mali neven (Little marigold), Novi Sad, 1982–1983.

== Applied illustration ==
She realized design for postage stamps (1956, with her husband Miloš), scenographies for the cartoon film "Adventure" (directed by Slavko Marjanac, "Avala Film", 1963), illustrations for the TV shows, calendars, greeting cards, posters, slide stories, unicate diplomas, record covers. She designed the lay-out and printing preparations of many books she illustrated.

She created a series of collage pictures which she called "a children room illustrations" (40 x 40 cm, 1968–1975), a series of colour figures made of plastic, 1979–1980; "wall pockets" (combination of linocut and colour markers on a sewed textile, 1981; design of unicate dress, 1981–1983; papier-mâché objects and lamp shades …

== Gallery ==
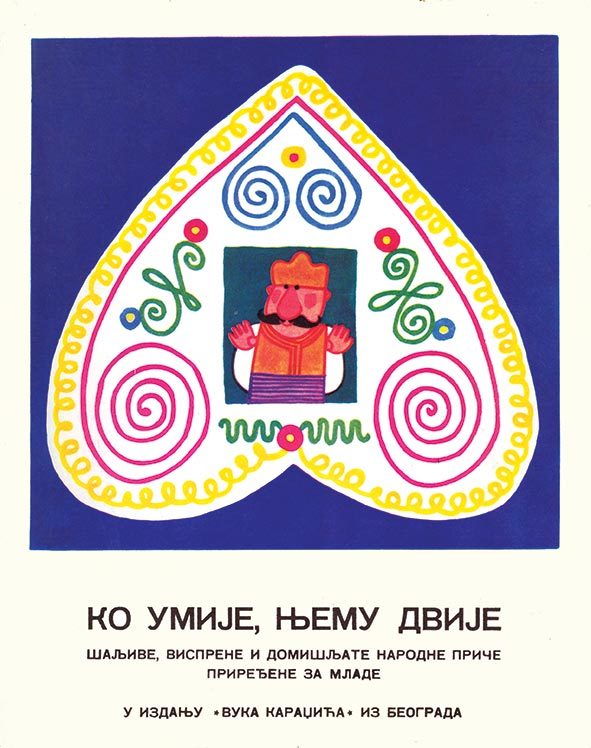
Ko umije njemu dvije (1966)

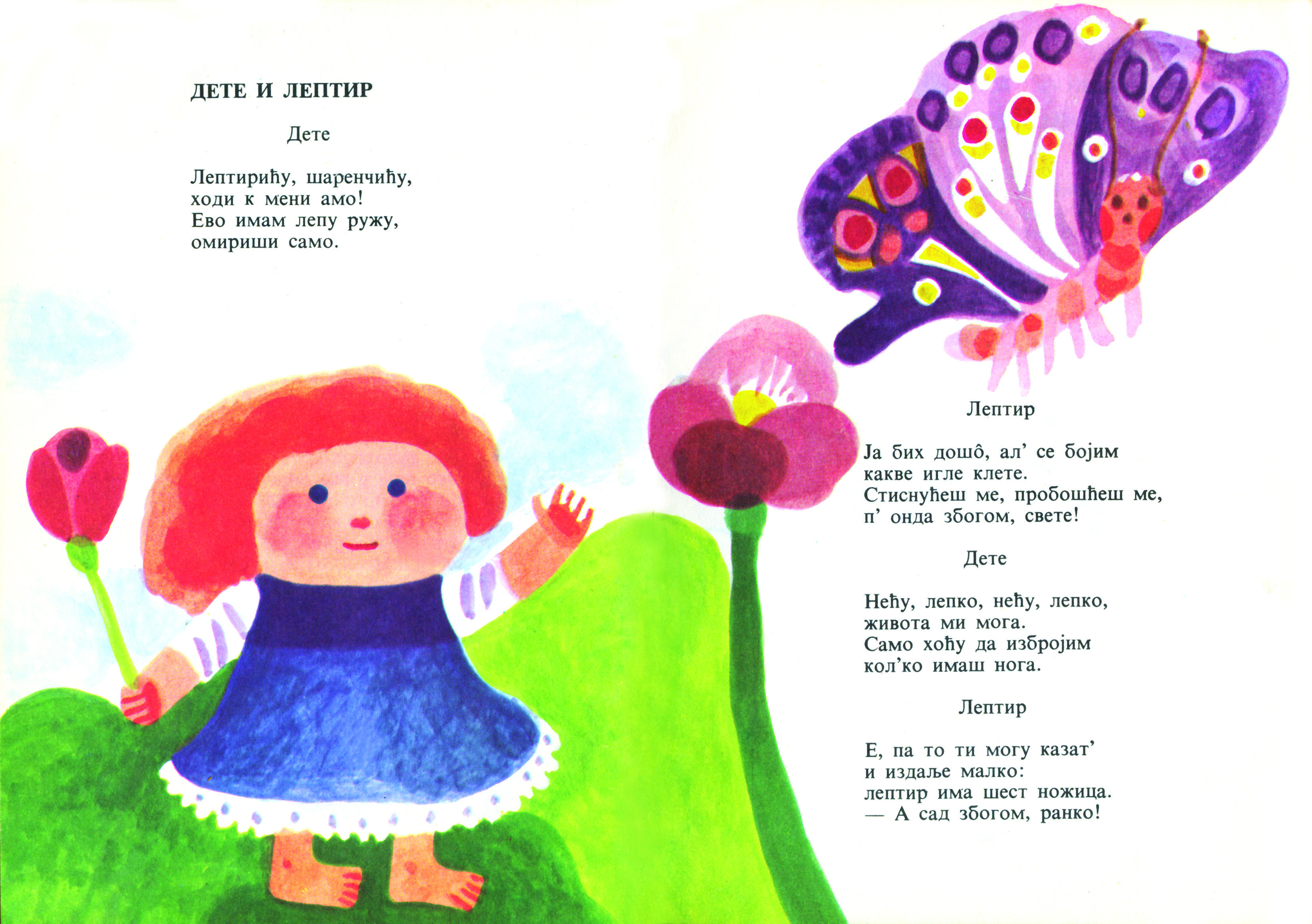
Zmajeva pevanija (1973)

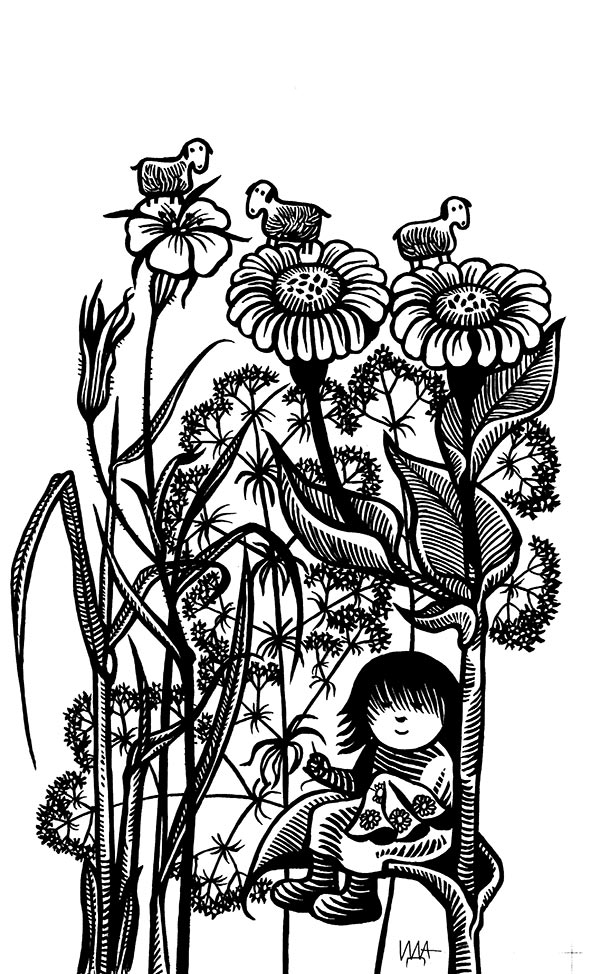
Cvetnik detinjstva (1975)

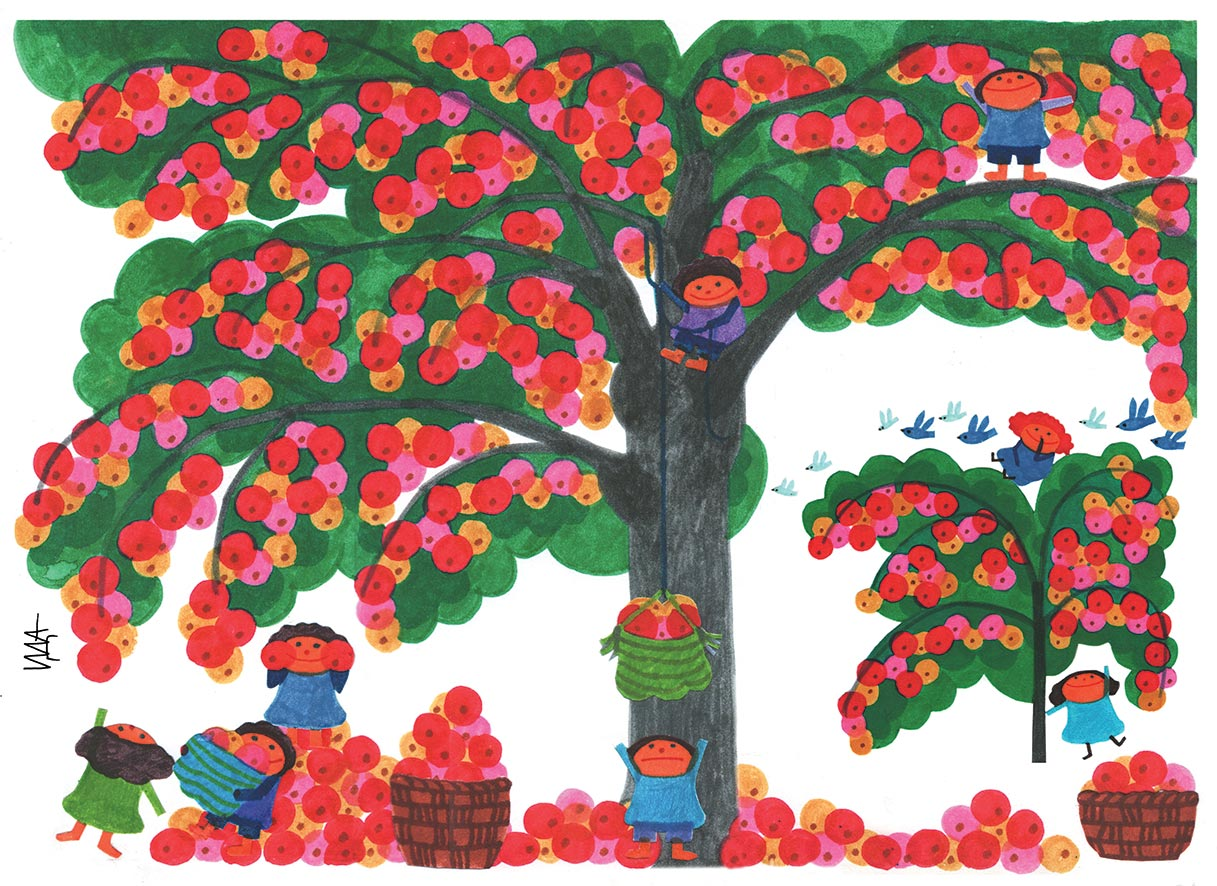
Čitanka godišnjih doba - LETO (1979)

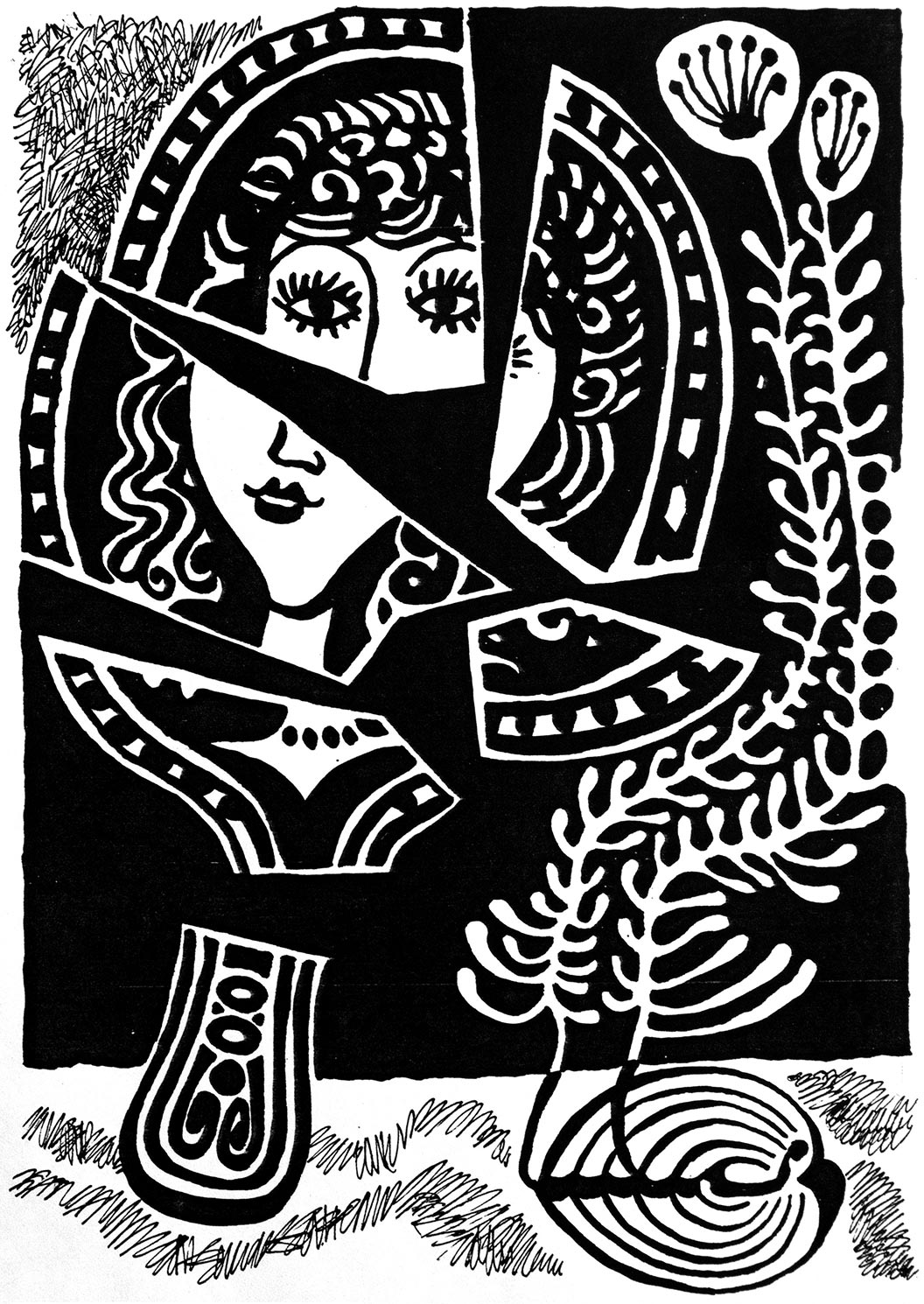
Olujić - Bajke (1987)

== Solo exhibitions ==
1. Ida & Miloš Ćirić, illustrations and graphic prints, Gallery of the "Đuro Salaj" Workers Education Centre, Belgrade, 17–27 November 1961
2. Ida & Miloš Ćirić, illustrations and logos, "Graphic Collective" Gallery, Belgrade, 1–10. October 1965
3. Ida & Miloš Ćirić, illustrations and graphic prints, Centre for Culture and Informations, Skoplje, (now Macedonia) 21–31 January 1972
4. Ida Ćirić, Illustrations, Salon of the Museum of Applied Arts, Belgrade, 7 November – 6 December 1979
5. Ida Ćirić, Jelena Kršić, Mirjana Kuruzović, illustrations (ceramics, paintings), "Kaštil" Gallery, Bol on island Brač (now Croatia), 5–14 August 1981
6. A Collection of hand-made painted table lampshades, "Reka" (River) Restaurant, Zemun, 1998
7. Ida Ćirić, Illustrations, posthumous retrospective exhibition, Museum of Applied Arts, Belgrade, 12 February – 10 March 2009

== Awards ==
- 1962 – The Golden Pen of Belgrade Plaque, Belgrade
- 1961 – The ULUPUDS Annual Prize, Belgrade
- 1963 – The Second Prize awarded by the Centre for Pictorial-Aesthetics Education of Children and Youth, Novi Sad
- 1964 – The Golden Pen of Belgrade Plaque for the best text-books illustration, Belgrade
- 1965 – The Marigold Prize, Novi Sad, State Award for the best illustrated book of the year
- 1965 – The Golden Pen of Belgrade Plaque, Belgrade
- 1968 – The Jubilee Golden Pen of Belgrade Plaque, Belgrade 1948–1968, Beograd
- 1968 – The Mlado pokolenje Prize, Belgrade
- 1971 – The Golden Pen of Belgrade Plaque, Belgrade
- 1973 – The October Salon, Academy of Applied Arts Award, Belgrade
- 1980 – Award of the Republic Culture Community for solo exhibition in 1979
- 1980 – The ULUPUDS Annual Prize, Belgrade

== Selected bibliography ==
- V. Andrejević, "In the border of two categories", exhibition of Ida and Miloš Ćirić at the RU 'Đuro Salaj' gallery" /"Na granici dve kategorije, Izložba Ide i Miloša Ćirića u galeriji RU 'Đuro Salaj'"/, Mozaik, No. 12, Dec. 1961.
- Milorad Panić Surep, Foreword in the catalog of the second one-man exhibition, Grafički kolektiv Gallery, Belgrade, 1. 10. 1965.
- Božidar Timotijević, "Ida Ćirić, a beauty of simplicity"/"Ida Ćirić, lepota jednostavnosti"/, Informativni bilten o izdanjima za decu i omladinu, "Mlado Pokolenje", 1967.
- Đorđe Kadijević, "Ida i Miloš Ćirić", Art No. 5, I, II, III, 1966.
- Dr Milan Ranković, Foreword in the catalog of the third one-man exhibition, Skoplje, 6 January 1972.
- Aranka Farago-Ptašnik, "Jó pajtás", Novi Sad, 14. 10. 1965. (Exhibition of Ida Ćirić)
- Bogdan Kršić, "Graphic work dedicated to children" /"Grafičko delo posvećeno deci"/, Grafički rad 6 (addendum "Grafička umetnost"), June 1979.
- Sveta Lukić, Text for the catalog of the one-man exhibition at the Museum of Applied Arts, Belgrade, Nov. 1979.
- Bogdan Kršić, Text for the catalog of the one-man exhibition at the Museum of Applied Arts, Belgrade, Nov. 1979.
- Miroslav A. Mušić, "Illustrations by Ida Ćirić" /"Ilustracije ide Ćirić"/, Industrial Design 53, Jan-Feb. 1980.
- Pavle Vasić, Applied arts in Serbia 1900–1978 /Primenjena umetnost u Srbiji 1900-1978/, Ulupuds, 1981.
- Divna Pervan, "Illustration, ceramics, paintings" /"Ilustracija, keramika, slike"/, text for the catalog of the exhibition of Ida Ćirić, Jelena Kršić and Mirjana Kuruzović, Bol on island Brač, 5–14th Aug. 1981.
- Vesna Lakićević, "Function of folklore and its influence on the development of illustration for children" /"Funkcija folklora i njegov uticaj na razvoj ilustracije za decu"/, Zbornik Slovenske narodne galerije, Bratislava, 1983.
- Ivanka Zorić, Illustrations of poems by Jovan Jovanović Zmaj from the first editions until today / Ilustracije pesama Jovana Jovanovića Zmaja od prvih izdanja do danas/, Museum of Applied Arts, Belgrade, 1983.
- Svetlana Isaković, Illustrations of children books, The Museum collection /Ilustracije dečjih knjiga, Muzejska zbirka /, Museum of Applied Arts, Belgrade, 1985.
- Pavle Vasić, Art life IV /Umetnički život IV/, University of Arts, Belgrade, 1987.
- Vesna Lakićević Pavićević, Illustrated Serbian journals for children /Ilustrovana štampa za decu kod Srba /, Ulupuds, 1994.
- Slobodan Jovanović: "Exhibition of Ida Ćirić" /"Izložba Ide Ćirić"/, foreword of the catalogue of the posthumous retrospective exhibition at the Museum of Applied Arts in Belgrade, 2009.
- Vesna Lakićević, "Ida Ćirić – illustrations" /"Ida Ćirić – ilustracije"/, text for the catalogue of the posthumous retrospective exhibition at the Museum of Applied Arts in Belgrade, 2009.
- Rastko Ćirić: "Ida Ćirić – a sketch for biography" /"Ida Ćirić – skica za biografiju"/, catalogue of the posthumous retrospective exhibition at the Museum of Applied Arts in Belgrade, 2009.
