= Miloš Ćirić =

Serbian visual artist and educator

- Born: 1931; Despotovo, Kingdom of Yugoslavia
- Died: 1999 (aged 67–68); Belgrade, Serbia, FR Yugoslavia
- Education: Faculty of Applied Arts, University of Arts, Belgrade
- Known for: Graphic design, illustration, typography
- Notable work: Chronicles of Symbols 1-5.

Miloš Ćirić (Serbian Cyrillic: Милош Ћирић; 1931–1999) was a Serbian visual artist and educator. The fields of his interest were art graphics, graphic identification, lettering, advertisement, book design, graphic animation, graphic-in-space and heraldry.

== Biography ==
Born in Despotovo in today's Serbia in 1931, Ćirić graduated in 1954 from the Academy of Applied Arts, Belgrade and took his master's degree in 1959, under Professor Mihailo S. Petrov. He was member of "The Applied Artists and Designers Association of Serbia" (ULUPUDS) since 1959 and the Association of Fine Artists of Serbia (ULUS) since 1962.

Titular professor at the Faculty of Applied Arts, University of Arts, Belgrade, Ćirić was the founder of the chair of Graphic Communication and taught at the FAA from 1964 until 1997. He was Head of the Graphic Department from 1974 to 1975.

He was author of extremely large opus: he created more than 1000 logos, a dozen of city coat-of-arms, about 20 one-off and bibliophile books and the same number of original letter designs, a big number of posters and other works from the field of graphic design. The most important works were: design of the exhibition "Robija – škola revolucionara", Beograd – Sremska Mitrovica, 1963; Lettering project: „Ćirićica", Belgrade, 1970/72; Graphic communication of the VMA, Belgrade, 1976/77; Manuscript dedicated to the Sveti Sava Temple, Belgrade, 1985. His magnum opus is "Chronicles of Symbols" 1–5, a five-volume chronological lexicon of visual symbols from the Balkans, on 2500 pages, with more than 10.000 illustrations, University of Arts, Belgrade, 2009.

In 1999, at the Faculty of Applied Arts, the 'Miloš Ćirić Fund Award' for the best student work in the field of graphic design was founded. Since 2004 at the FAA, in the end of October, a manifestation "Ćira’s Days" has been held in his honour.

Ćirić family is notable by its visual artists. Miloš's wife was Ida Ćirić, and his sons are Rastko and Vukan Ćirić.

=== Main publications ===
- Grafička identifikacija 1961–1981 /Graphic identification 1961-1981/, Srpska književna zadruga, Belgrade, 1982
- Grafičke komunikacije 1954–1984. /Graphic communications 1954-1984/, "Vajat", Belgrade, 1986
- Heraldika 1 /Heraldry 1/, text-book, University of Arts, Belgrade, 1983 (second edition 1988)
- Grb grada Beograda /Coat-of-Arms of Belgrade/, Cicero, Belgrade, 1991
- Grafički znak i simbol /Graphic Sign and Symbol/ (posthumous), Prometej and FAA, 2001
- Letopis simbola /Chronicles of Symbols/ 1–5, University of Arts, Belgrade, 2009.

=== Bibliophile and hand made books ===
- Spomenici /The monuments/, 1961, 10 woodcuts, edition 10
- Kornjače /Turtles/, 1961, linocuts and offset prints, edition 10
- Imena /Names/, 1961, 10 woodcuts and linocuts, edition 10
- Devet triptihona /Nine triptych/, 1962, 10 linocuts, edition 36
- Beli teror /The white terror/, 1963, 9 woodcuts and linocuts, edition 10
- Žar ptica velegrada /The metropolitan flaming bird/, 1965, 8 lino-cuts, edition 20
- Rodoslov /Genealogy/, 1968, 12 sheets, tempera, 20x41 cm
- Vojnici /Soldiers/, 1969, tempera, 6 plates, 29x36 cm
- Ratnik /The warrior/, 1970, tempera, 10 plates
- Ni crno ni belo ni jeste ni nije /Neither black or white, neither yes or no/, 1971, ink and tempera
- Pečati /The stamps/, 1972, 10 linocuts, edition 12

=== One-man exhibitions ===
Belgrade, 1961, 1965, 1968, 1971, 1982, 1986; Zrenjanin, 1964, 1969; Subotica, 1964; Bol, Brač, 1967; Novi Sad, 1967; Skoplje, 1972; Priboj, 1977; Stolac, 1981.

=== Awards and recognitions (a choice) ===
- The Golden Pen of Belgrade, 1964;
- Large Plaquette of the University of Arts, Belgrade, 1983;
- Main Award of the Ministry of Culture, 1987;
- Award for Life Achievement, ULUPUDS, Belgrade, 1998.

== Gallery ==
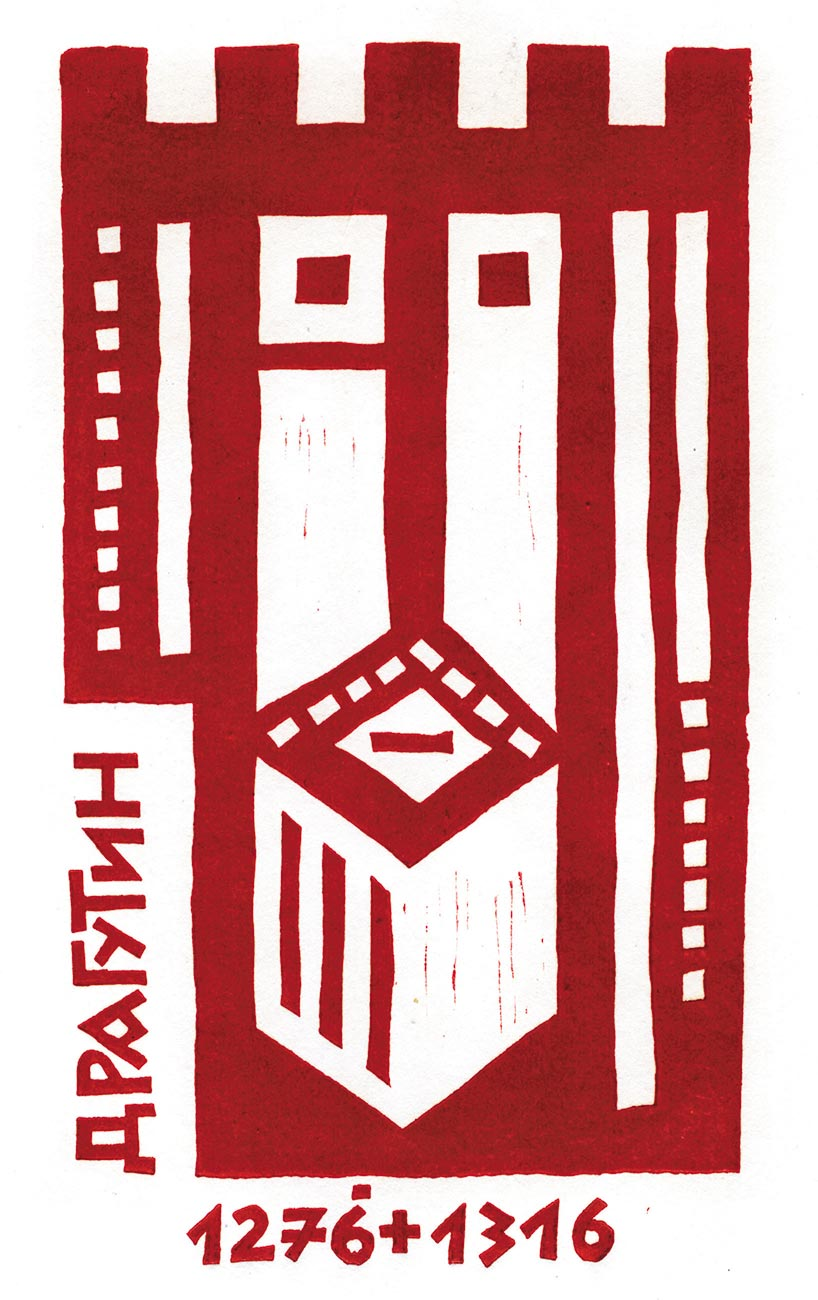
Dragutin, linocut (from the bibliophile book Names), 1961.

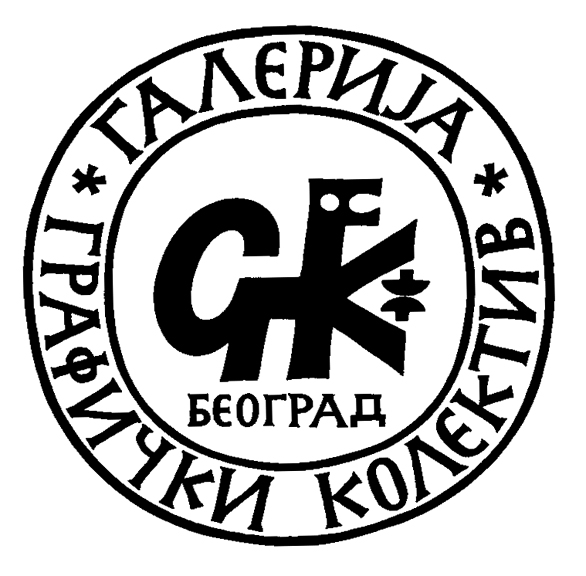
Logo for the Grafički Kolektiv Gallery, 1962.

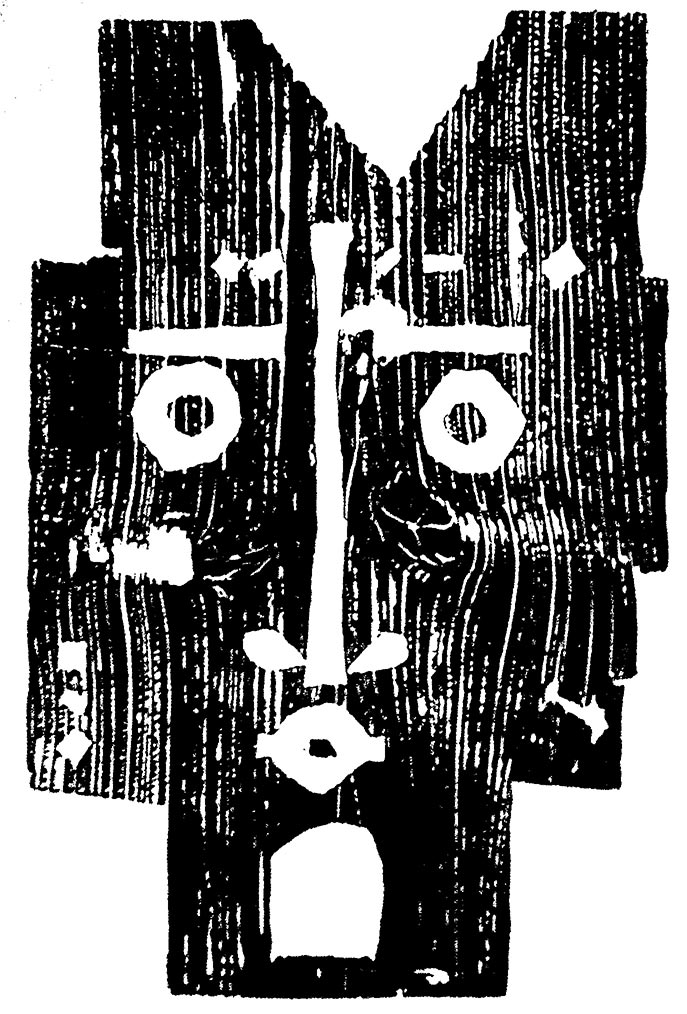
Unknown Hero, woodcut, 1962.

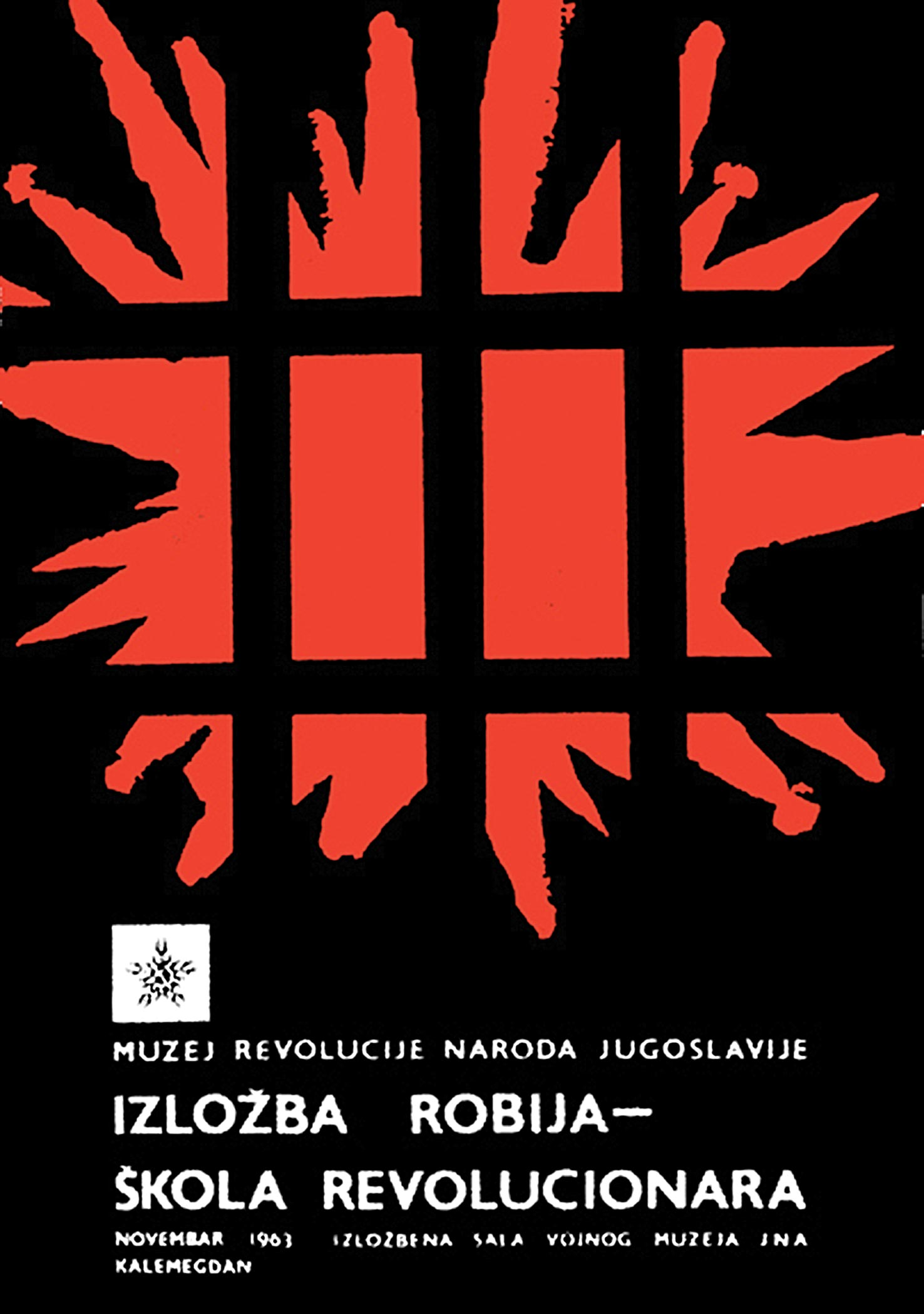
Poster for the exhibition Robija škola revolucionara, 1963.

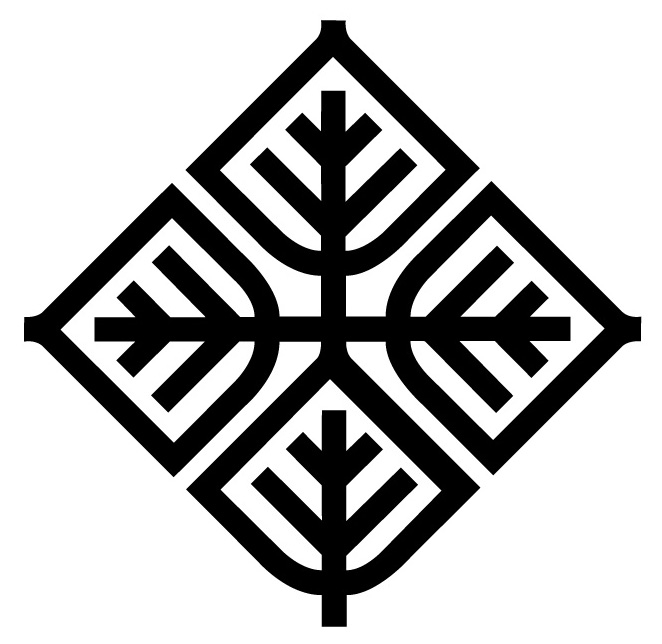
Logo for the University of Arts and faculties of arts in Belgrade, 1966.

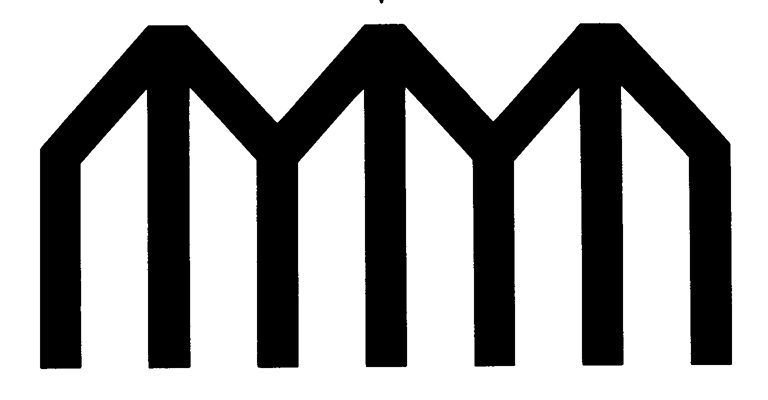
Logo for the Museum of Contemporary Arts in Belgrade, 1967.

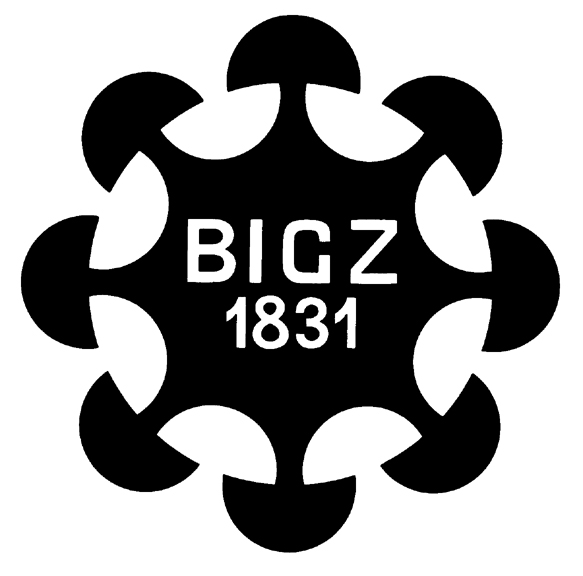
Logo for the BIGZ, Belgrade Publishers Graphic Company, 1970.

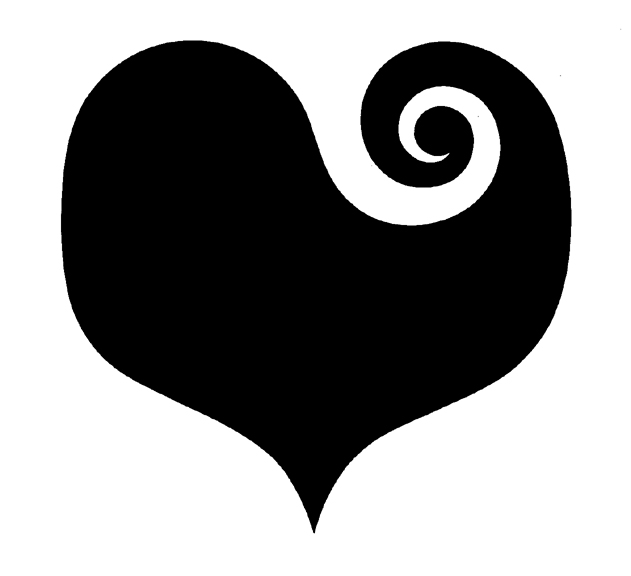
Logo for the Hotel Company Zlatni rat, Bol, Brač, Croatia, 1970.

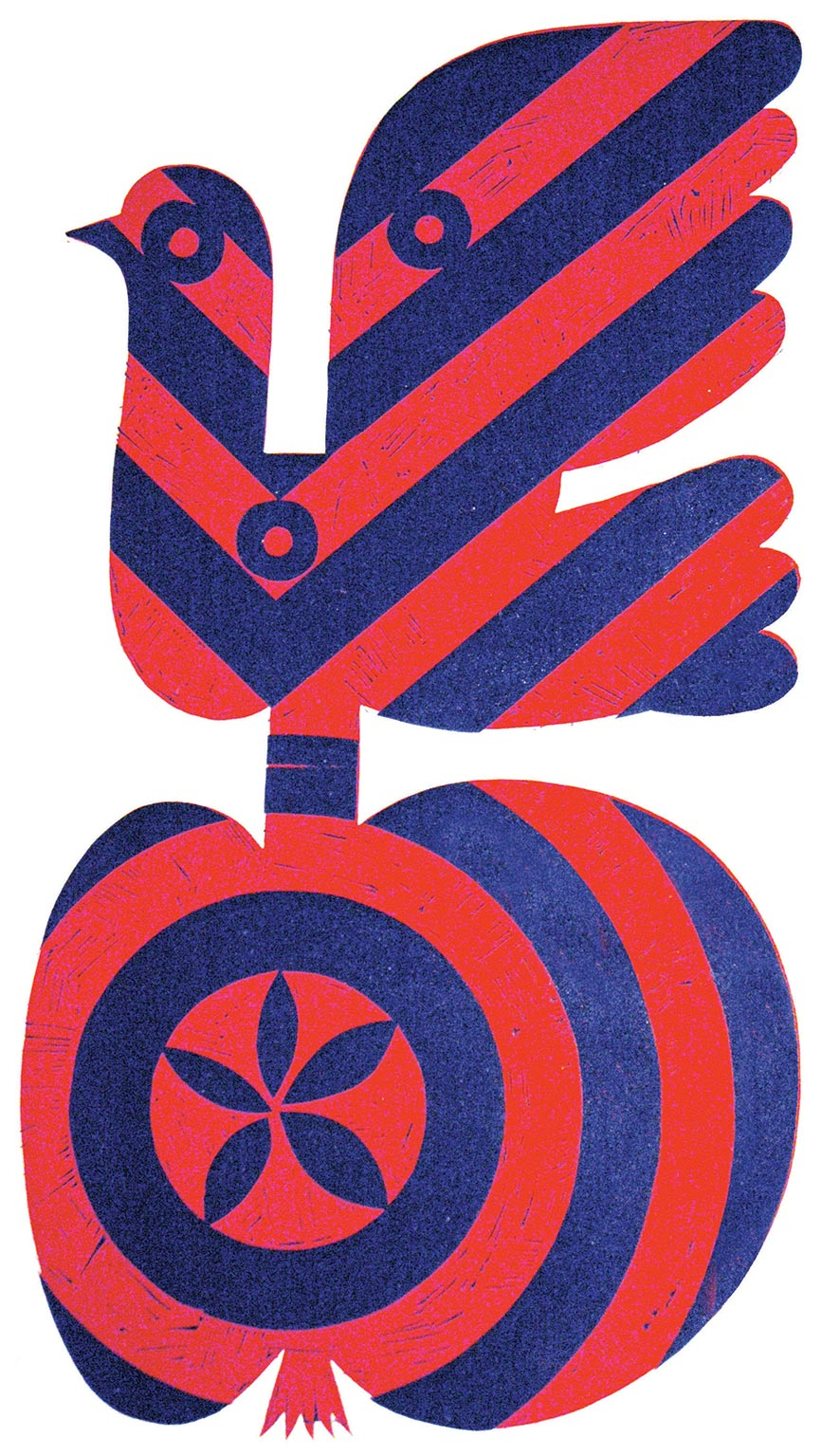
Time of Peace, linocut in colour, 1971.

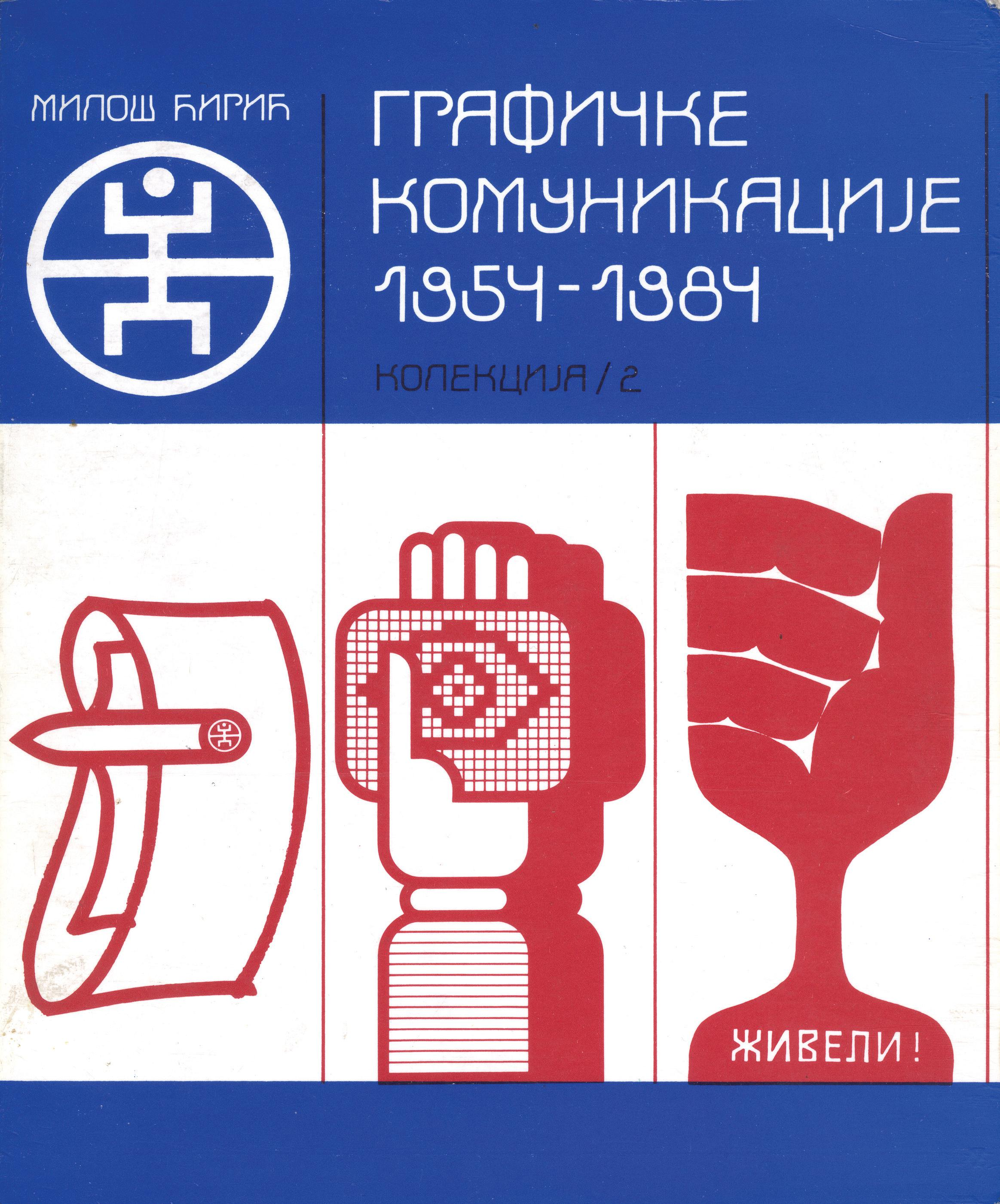
Graphic Communications 1954–1984, A collection of works, Vajat, Belgrade,1986.
