= Rastko Ćirić =

Serbian multimedia artist and educator

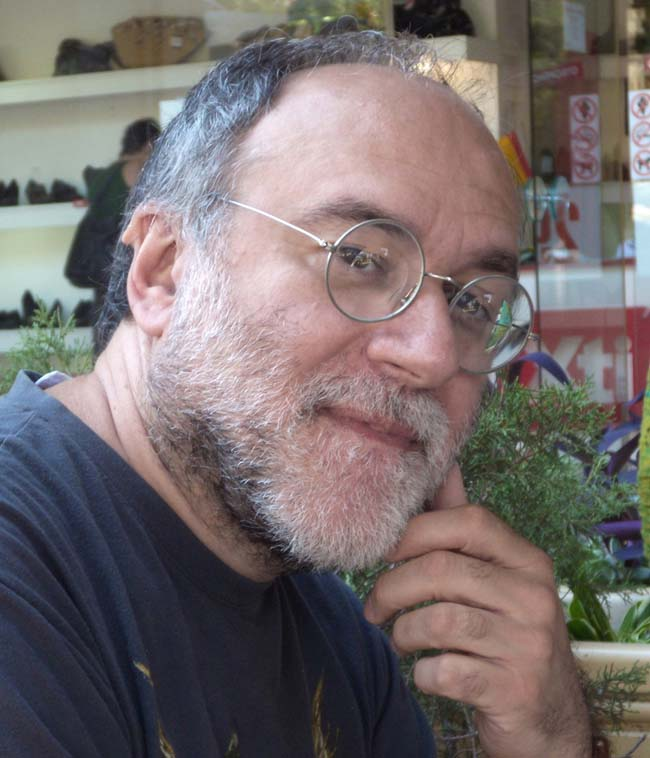
- Ćirić in 2009
- Born: 24 May 1955 (age 71) Belgrade, PR Serbia, FPR Yugoslavia

Rastko Ćirić (Serbian Cyrillic: Растко Ћирић, pronounced [râstko tɕîritɕ]; born 24 May 1955) is a Serbian multimedia artist and educator. His fields of interest are graphics, illustration, logo design, ex-libris, comics, animation and music. He has won more than 70 local and international awards. He is a professor at the Faculty of Applied Arts in Belgrade.

== Biography ==
He was born into an artistic family. His parents, father Miloš and mother Ida, met at the Academy of Applied Arts in Belgrade. Rastko graduated in 1979, and finished his postgraduate studies in 1982 from the same school, now Faculty of Applied Arts. He is now a professor at the same school and Vice-Rector of the University of Arts in Belgrade.

He achieved voluminous opus in all the graphic fields, in film and in music. He authored 14 animated films. He has 44 individual exhibitions (Belgrade; Novi Sad; Vranje; Ljubljana and Kopar, Slovenia; Annecy and Orléans, France; Legnica, Poland; Hiroshima, Japan; Seoul, Korea; Polleur, Belgium). He was collaborator–illustrator of the New York Times Book Review.

He has been employed at the Faculty of Applied Arts since 1991. Since 2004, he has been a full-time professor of Illustration and Animation at the Applied Graphics department at the FAA, and leader of the Digital Arts Program at the interdisciplinary DA studies of the University of Arts in Belgrade. He is the founder and editor of the book edition and magazine “Signum” FAA (2006).

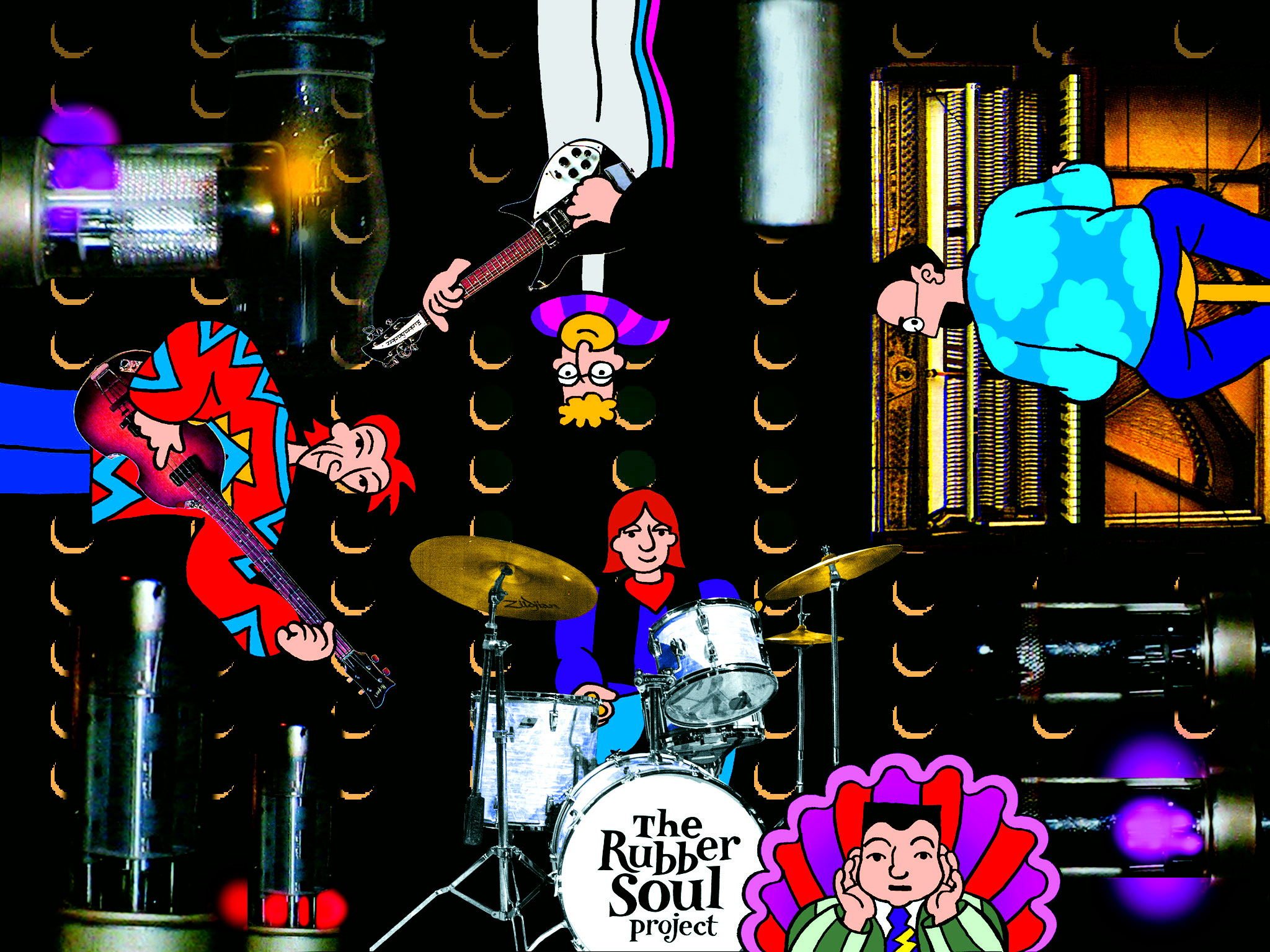
From the film THE RUBBER SOUL PROJECT by Dinko Tucaković, 2004

He is the author of the internationally recognised music project The Rubber Soul Project, inspired by The Beatles. A feature documentary by the same name (2004) directed by Dinko Tucaković, was dedicated to this project. A CD and DVD were published in 2006 in the USA. His new album The Rubber Soul Project 2, with Igor Kordey as producer was recorded in 2013 and released in 2015.

Ćirić is a member of ULUPUDS, ASIFA, Belgrade Ex-libris Circle, Art Directors Club Serbia and Association of Comics Artists of Serbia.

He is the founder and art director of the Festival of European Student Animation FESA (2012).

He lives in Belgrade.

== Bibliography ==
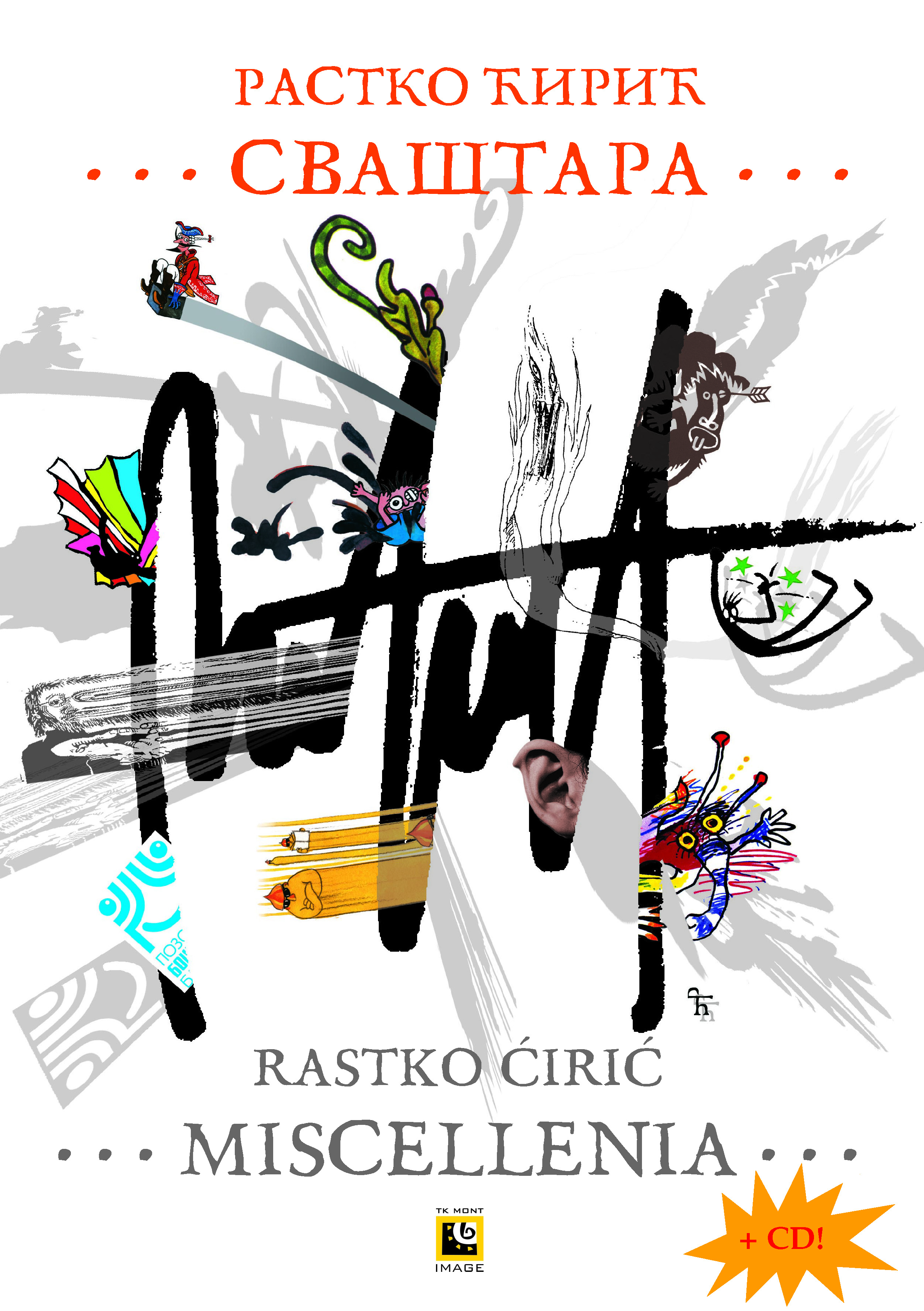
MISCELLENIA 1, collections of works, New Image, 2005

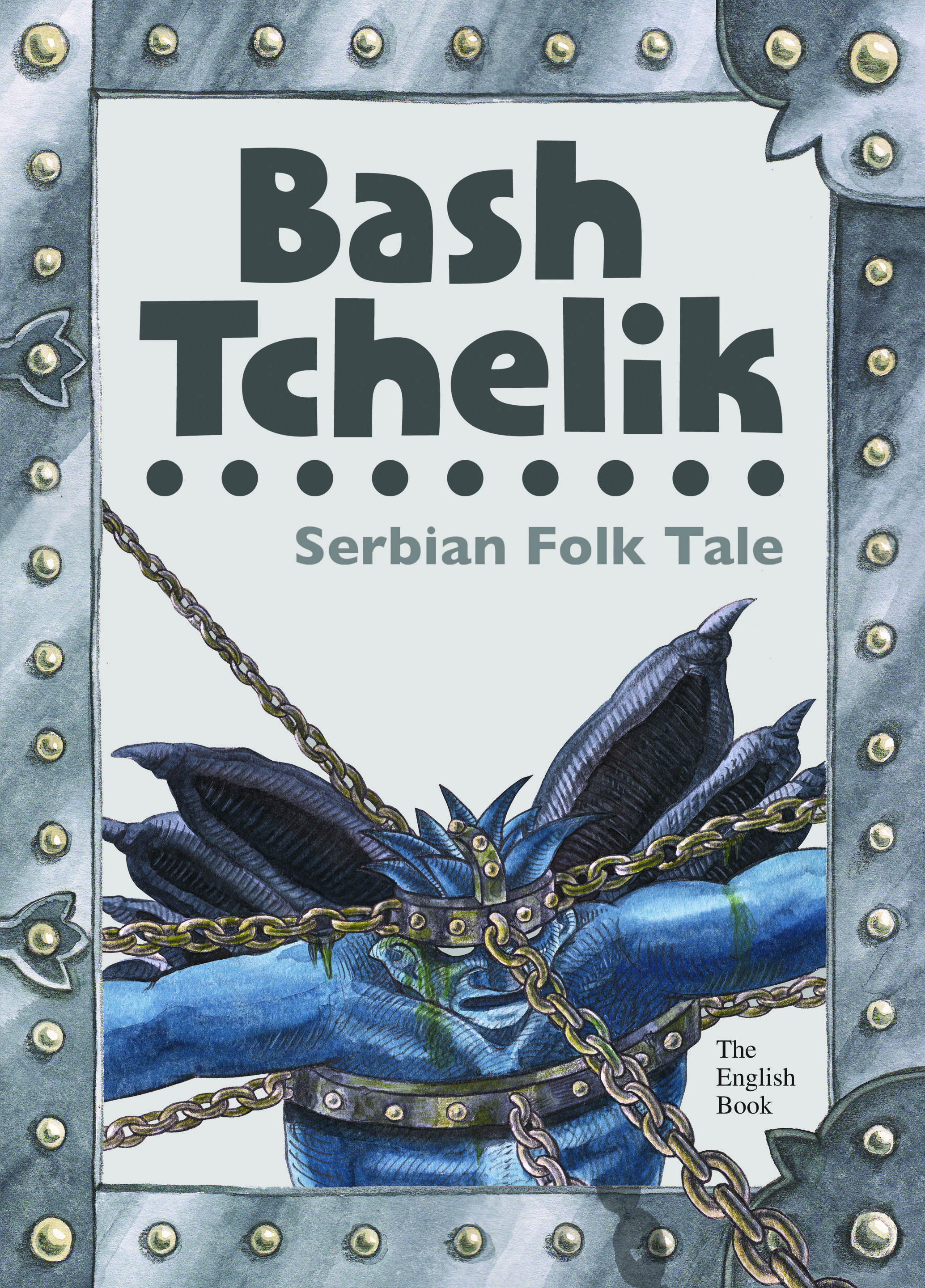
BASH TCHELIK book cover, 2010

- Take Your Drawings for a Walk – Small School of Animation (Prošetajte svoje crteže – Mala škola animacije, 1986)
- Ogres and Bogies (Ale i Bauci), with Aleksandar Palavestra (1989, 2002, 2013)
- Handy Zoo (Svojeručni zoo, 1990)
- Common Life Anatomy (Anatomija svakodnevnog života, 1994, 1998)
- Manual for Sophisticated Bondaging (Priručnik za dovitljivo sputavanje, 1994, 1998)
- Ogres and Boogies Self-Defence Manual (Priručnik za odbranu i zaštitu od ala i bauka, 1994, 1998)
- Telephone Jokes (Telefonski vicevi, 1994, 1998)
- First, Second and Third Story About Farty (Prva, druga i treća priča o Prtku, 1992, 1994, 2000)
- Invisible and Poorly Visible Animal Species (Nevidljive i slabo vidljive životinjske vrste, 1998)
- Fairy Chess (Vilinski šah, 1998)
- Ping-Pong Balls Cracker (Krckalica za ping-pong loptice, 1999)
- Targetophilia (Meta-fore, 1999)
- Centaur Letters (Slova-kentauri, 2000)
- Pangrams (Pangrami, 2000)
- Home-Bred Metamorph Cultivating Manual (Priručnik za gajenje domaćeg metamorfa, 2002)
- Ten Lecturers by Rastko Ćirić (Deset poučnika Rastka Ćirića, 2003)
- What is Rebus? (Šta je rebus?, 2003)
- Miscellenia (Svaštara, 2005)
- Collection of Texts about Ex-Libris (Zbornik o ekslibrisu, 2007)
- Bash Tchelik (2010)
- Studio Bikić (2013) with M. Jelić and M. Novaković
- Collection of texts about FAA 1 (Zbornik FPU 1, 2013)

== Animated films ==
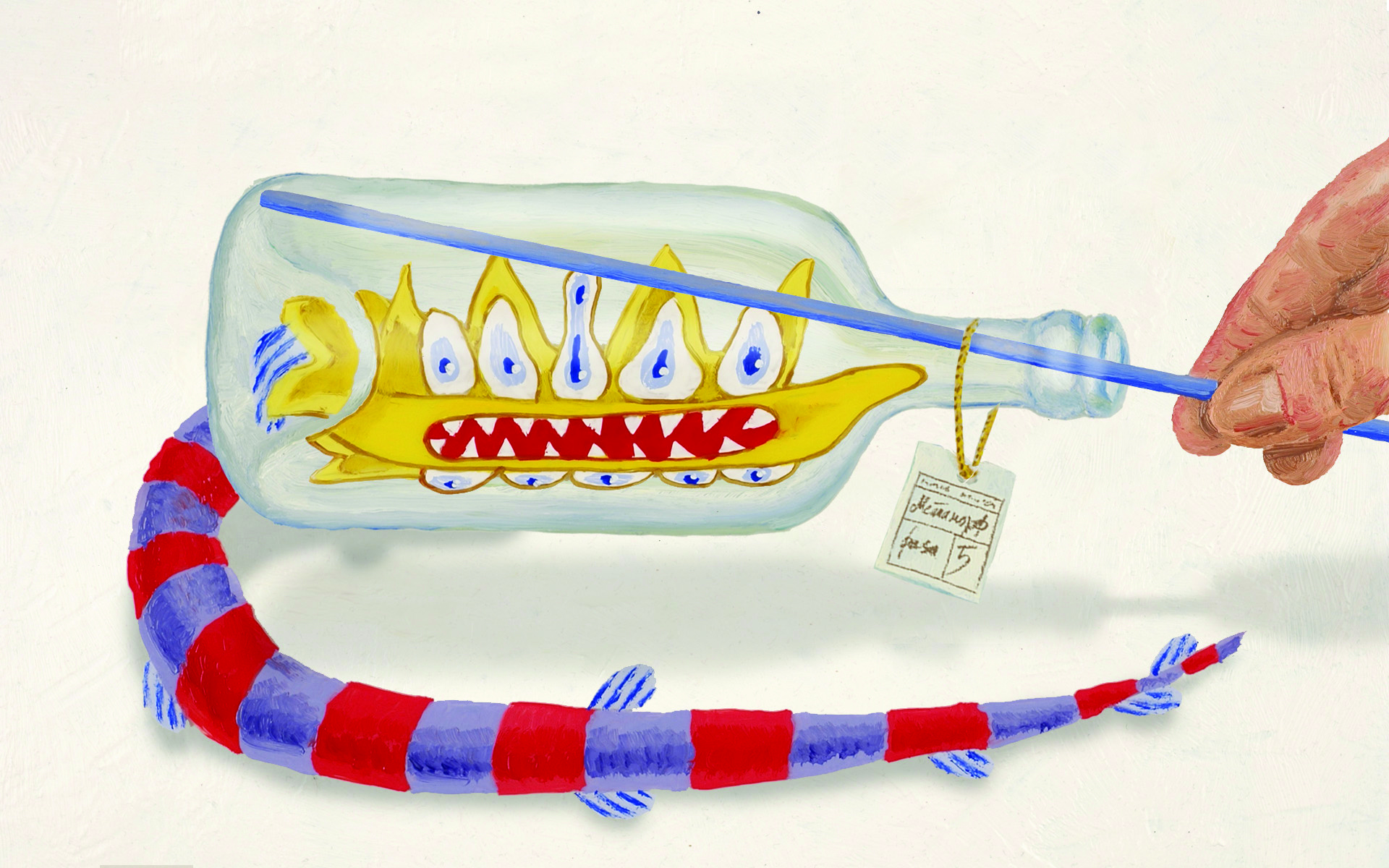
From the film Metamorph, 2005

- The Circus Departs (1982, Neoplanta Film), 6:00 Music: Đorđe Balašević
- Stop (1983, Dunav Film/FDU) 1:20
- It's not Whether You Win or Lose (1984, Dunav Film) 1:30, Olympiad of Animation, Los Angeles, 1984
- Tango Ragtime (1985, Dunav Film) 8:15 Music: Rastko Ćirić and Laza Ristovski
- The Tower of Bababel (1988, Zagreb Film) 4:30 Music: Laza Ristovski
- Ogres and Bogies (1989, Avala Film) 9:00 Music: Laza Ristovski
- Farty (1993, Dunav Film/Aura) 2:30 Music: Dragan Ilić
- Light in A-Major (1995, Avala Film) 4:30 Music: Laza Ristovski
- Invisible and Poorly Visible Animal Species (1998, Dunav Film) 4:35 Music: Dragan Ilić
- Magician (1999, Dunav Film) 1:00 text: Dušan Radović, music: Miodrag Ilić Beli, Dragan Ilić. Part of the series “Esteemed Children”
- Wanted (2001, Dunav Film) 1:00 text: Dušan Radović, music: Dragan Ilić. Part of the series “Esteemed Children”
- All Together on The Wireless Machine (2004, Soul Flower) 3:00 text Goran Skrobonja, music: Rastko Ćirić. Opening part of the feature documentary The Rubber Soul Project, directed by Dinko Tucaković.
- Metamorph (2005, Rastko Ćirić & BS Group) 10:30 English version, narrated by Timothy John Byford
- Metamorph (2005, Rastko Ćirić & BS Group) 10:30 Serbian version, narrated by Branislav Milićević
- Fantasmagorie 2008 (2008, Rastko Ćirić & Metamorf) 8:30 Music: Nebojša Ignjatović
- Fantasmagorie 2008, stereoscopic version (2008, Rastko Ćirić & Metamorf) 8:30 Music: Nebojša Ignjatović

== Music ==
- Tango Ragtime, from the animated film of the same name (performed by Laza Ristovski) 1985.
- Rubber Soul Project, 15 compositions inspired by the Beatles music, texts by Goran Skrobonja, producers N. Ignjatović and M. Cvetković, 1996.
- The Reservation Blues, antiwar song, with the Reservate Band (later Target project), producer Đorđe Petrović, April 1999.
- City And Memory, music for the feature documentary film by Gabriela Hohleitner, Austria, 2000.
- Rubber Soul Project 2, 17 compositions inspired by the Beatles music, texts by Goran Skrobonja, producer Igor Kordey, 2013.

== Awards and recognitions ==
Won more than 70 awards and recognitions for animation, graphics and social work.

More import awards for animation: Munich 1982, Zagreb 1988, Ottawa 1988, Belgrade 1989, Titograd, 1989, Belgrade 1989, Zlatibor 1993, Novi Sad 1993, Belgrade 1998, Kiev, Ukraine 1998, Drama, Greece 1998, Belgrade 1999, Grand-prix Čačak 1999, Grand-prix Belgrade 2006, Moscow 2006, Hiroshima 2006, Belgrade 2008, Ljubljana 2008, Belgrade 2009, Lipecki, Russia 2009.

Winner of the plaque „Nikola Mitrović Kokan“ for the contribution to the Serbian comic strip, in 2003.

== Gallery ==
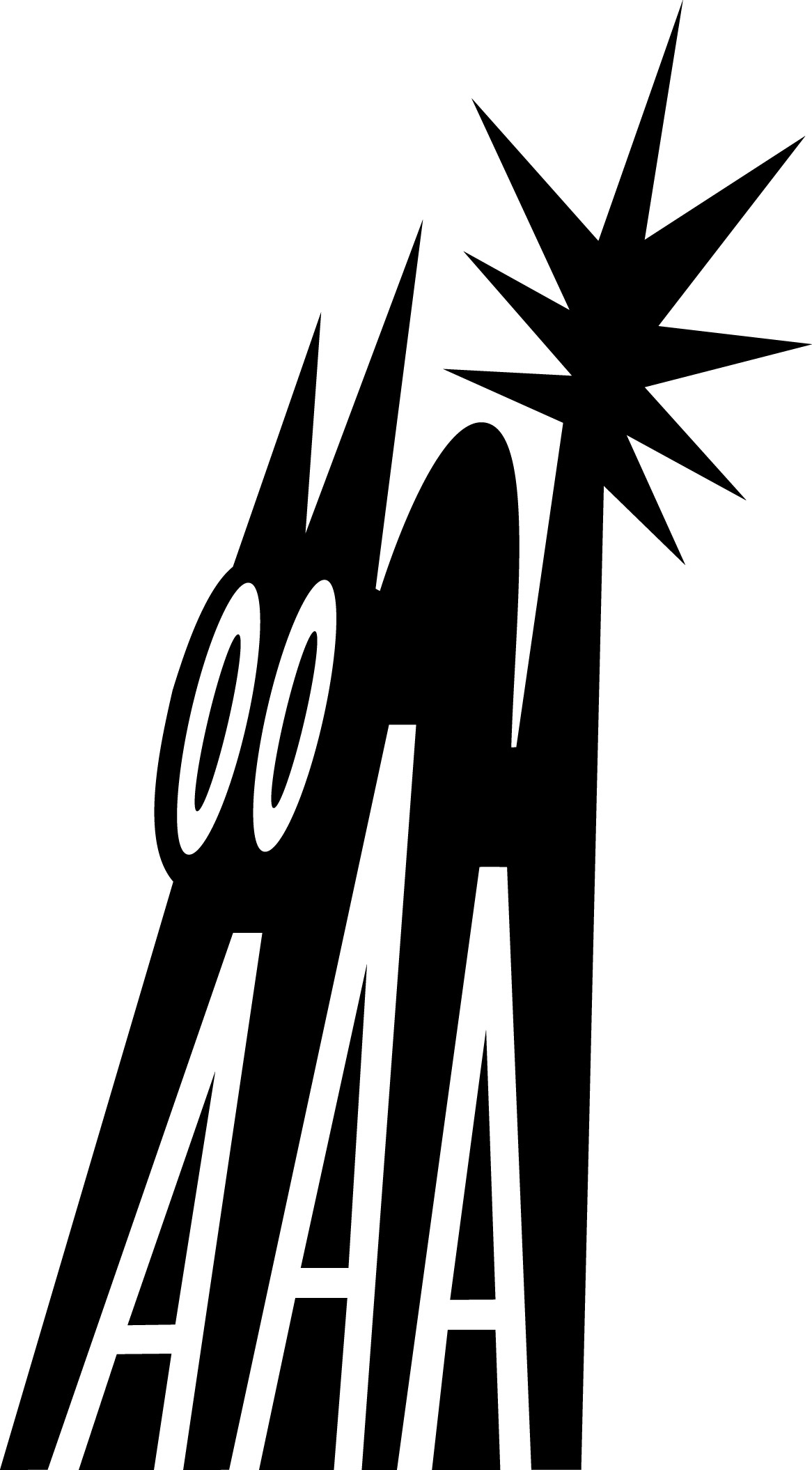
Logo for AVALA ANIMATION ATELIER, 1987

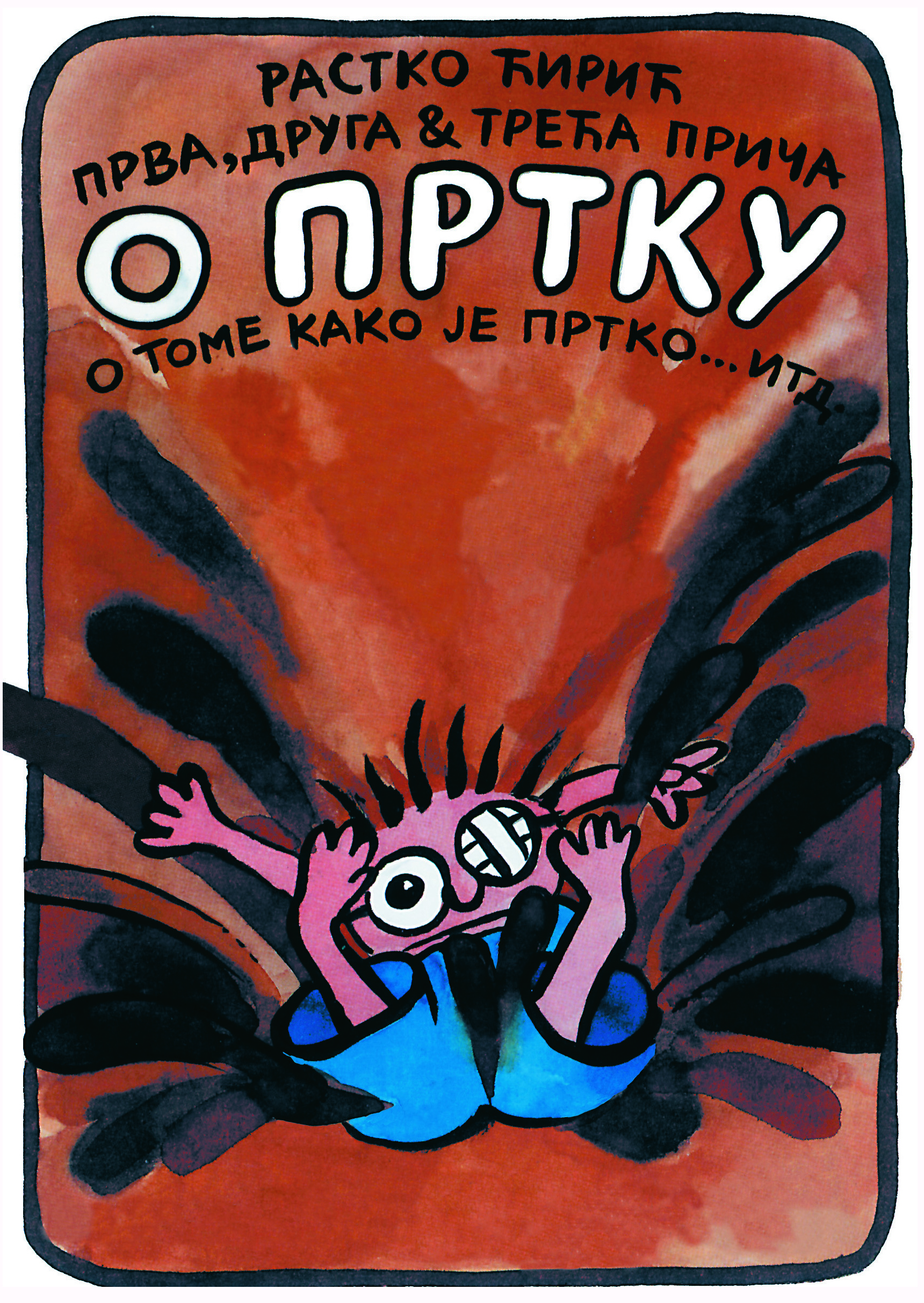
FARTY book cover, 1993

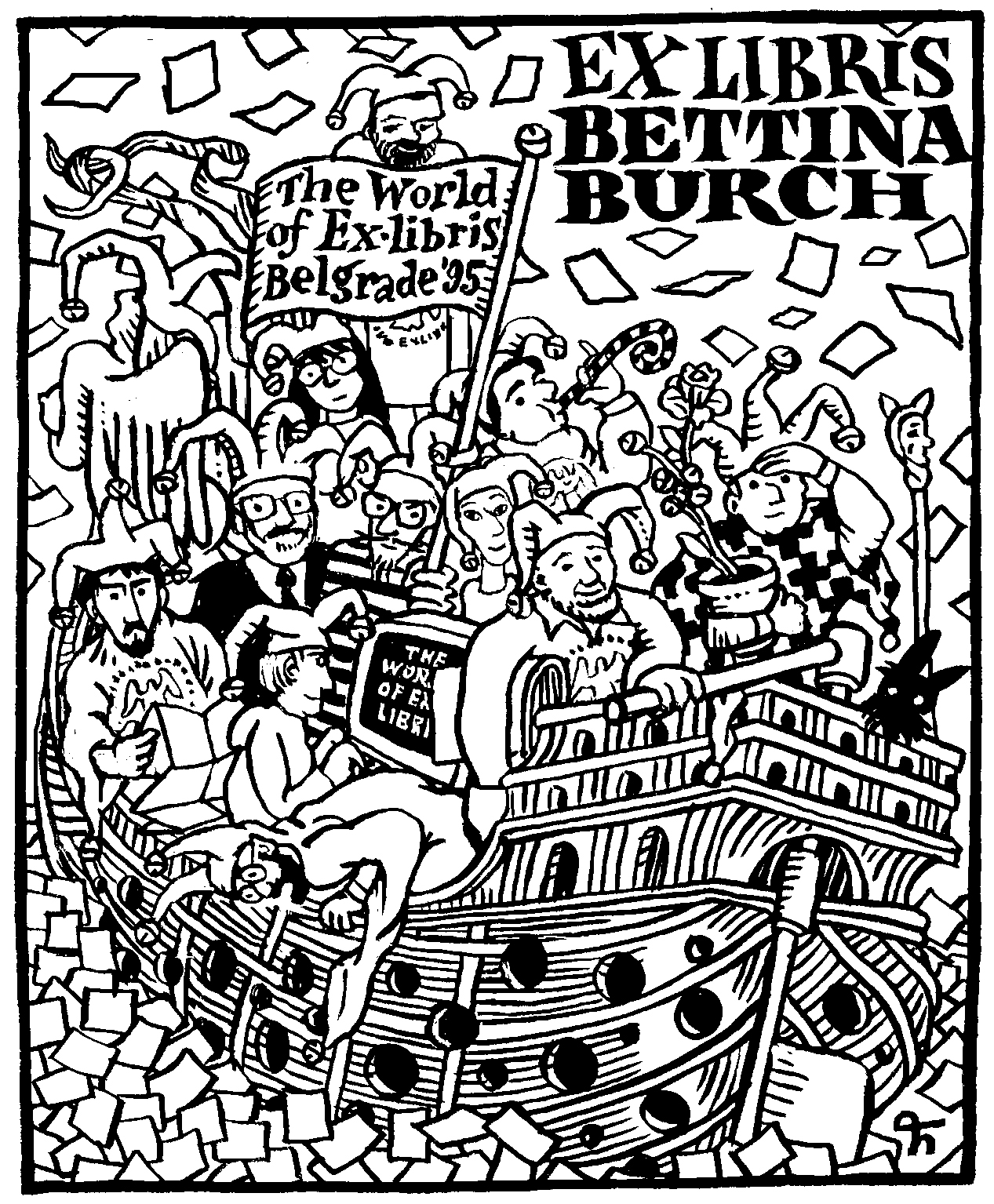
Ex-libris BETTINA BURCH, 1995

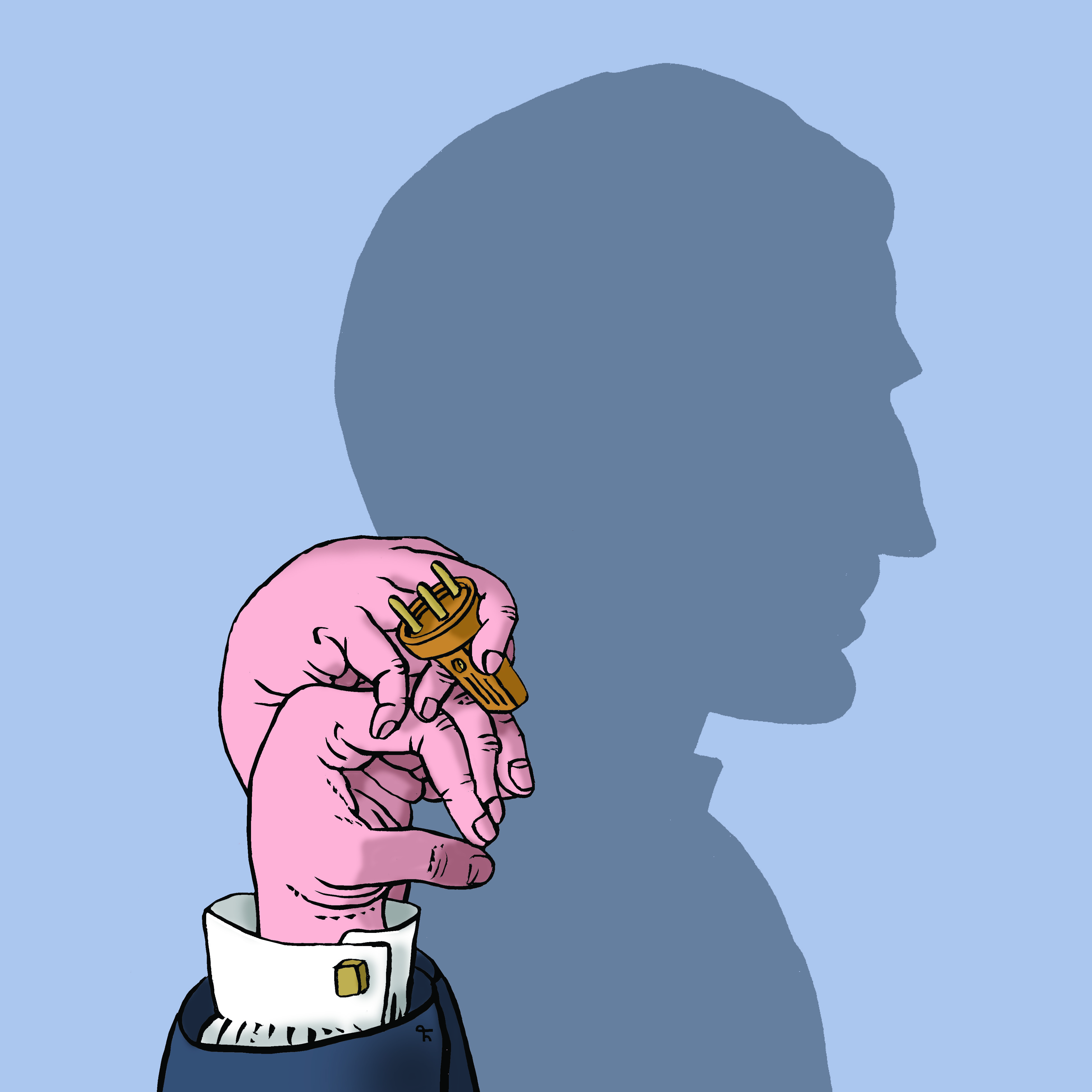
NIKOLA TESLA – History of Light, from the 2015 BUCK calendar

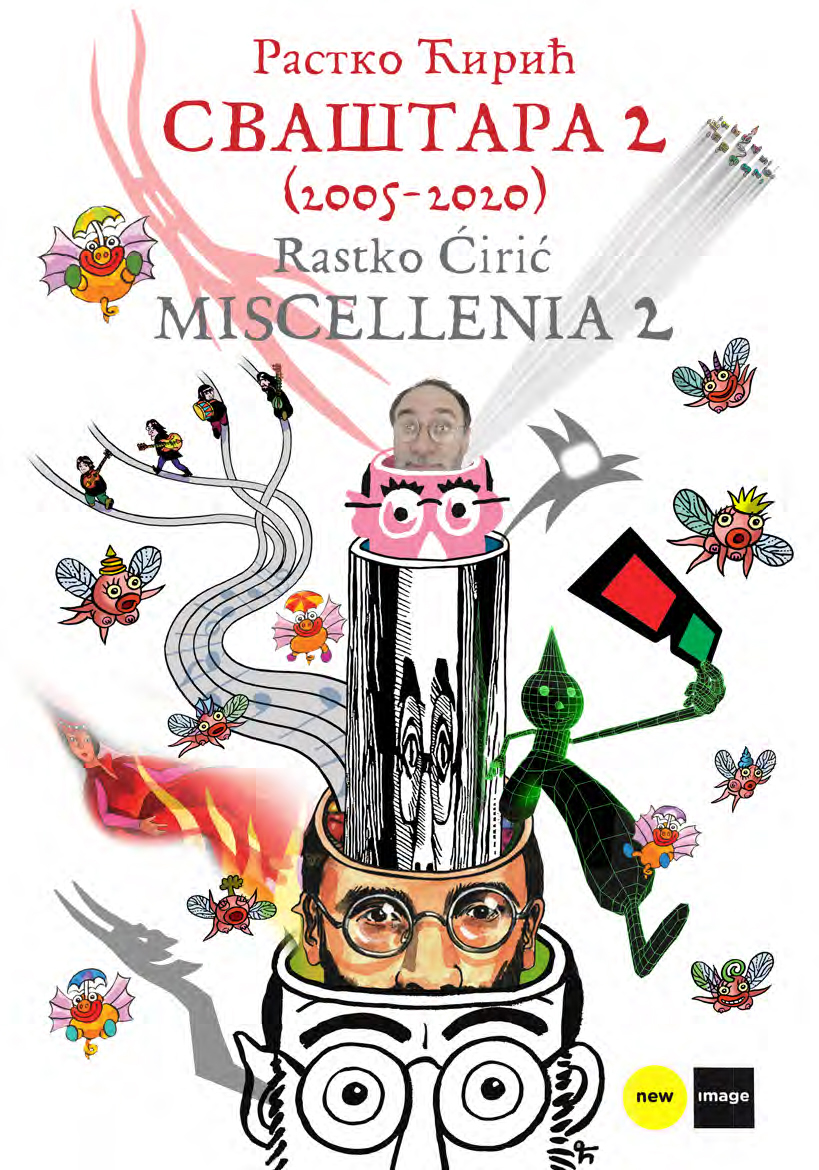
MISCELLENIA 2, collections of works, New Image, 2021

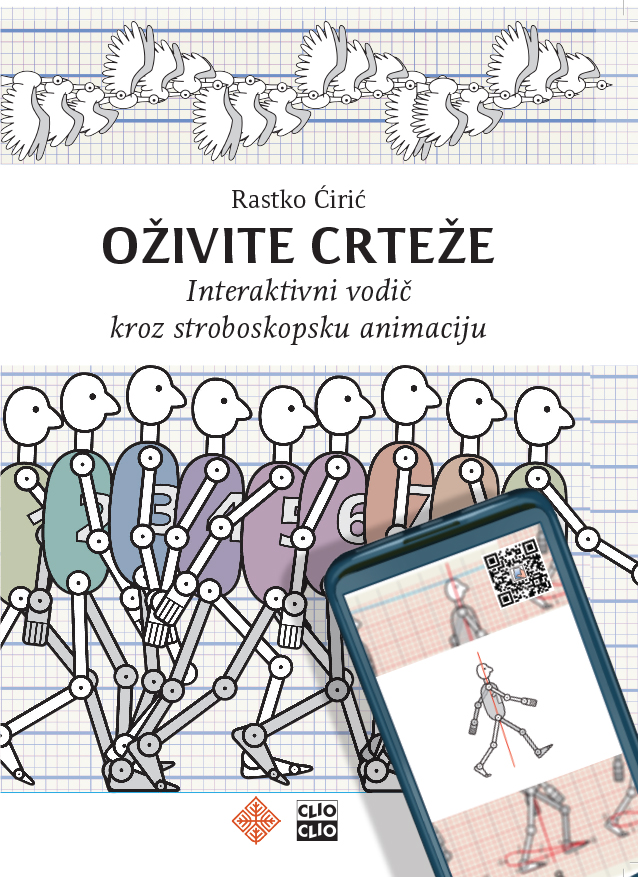
BRING YOUR DRAWINGS TO LIFE, interactive animation textbook, FAA/Clio, 2023
