= Rubber Soul Project =

Serbian band

The Rubber Soul Project

Background information
- Also known as: RSP
- Origin: Belgrade, Serbia
- Genres: Rock
- Labels: PGP-RTS, Paladin
- Members: Rastko Ćirić; Nebojša Ignjatović; Miroslav Cvetković; Čedomir Macura; Damjan Dašić; Marko Ćalić
- Website: therubbersoulproject.com

The Rubber Soul Project was a Serbian rock band. The band took their name from the famous Beatles record Rubber Soul released in 1965. Their first album, The Rubber Soul Project, released in 1996, was conceived as an imaginary Beatles album, with the band writing music and lyrics to songs for which they had heard only the titles.

== History ==
=== The Rubber Soul Project ===
The band history begins in 1993 in Belgrade, when visual artist Rastko Ćirić, professor of Illustration and Animation at the Belgrade Faculty of Applied Arts and horror and science fiction writer Goran Skrobonja bonded over their mutual love for the Beatles. Inspired by the titles of songs the Beatles never released (some of which were available on bootleg recordings in Western Europe, but not in Serbia) they found in Jeff Russel's book The Beatles – Album files and Complete Discography, the two set out to write lyrics and music in the manner in which the Beatles would have done it. The lyrics were written by Skrobonja, and the music was written by Ćirić. The two then decided to record the album with their songs. In 1995, the band, named The Rubber Soul Project (in honor of the 30th anniversary of the Beatles Rubber Soul album), was formed. It consisted of Ćirić, Nebojša Ignjatović, musician, former member of Dogovor iz 1804. and professor of double bass at the Belgrade Music Academy, Miroslav Cvetković, bass guitarist of the popular Serbian band Bajaga i Instruktori, and Čedomir Macura, the drummer of Bajaga i Instruktori.

The album The Rubber Soul Project was recorded from December 1994 to March 1995. On the album recording Ćirić sang and played acoustic guitar, piano, soprano recorder, tambourine, maracas, kazoos, jingle bells and xylophone, Ignjatović sang and played electric guitar, twelve-string guitar, acoustic guitar, piano, tambourine, cabassa, synthesizer and flute, Cvetković played Höfner 500/1 violin bass, tambourine, electric guitar, keyboard bass, maracas, slide guitar and sang backing vocals, and Macura played drums and percussion and did lead vocals on the track "When I Come To Town", the "Ringo Starr song" of the album. The album was produced by Ignjatović and Cvetković, the latter also being the recording engineer. The goal of the band members was to produce the authentic Beatles sound and atmosphere. Miroslav Cvetković played the Höfner 500/1 violin bass, the same type Paul McCartney used, and Macura played on the Ludwig drum set, the type Ringo Starr played on all Beatles records. The album included a sitar George Harrison-style track called "Indian Rope Trick", rock and roll songs "Home", "When I Come To Town", and "Bound By Love", psychedelic "Colliding Circles", "Watching Rainbows", and "Rubber Soul".

In March 1996, record label PGP-RTS released the album on vinyl (circulation of less than 200 copies, exclusively for radio stations) and cassettes. The album was met by positive reactions from both the audience and the critics. In April 1996, an article about the project was published in Billboard magazine. Several videos were recorded for the songs from the album. The video for the song "Colliding Circles", directed by Srđan Marković and Jelena Obradović, was awarded the Golden Plaque and the video for the song "Rubber Soul", directed by Aleksandar Dević, was awarded the Best Debut Award at the 1998 Belgrade Festival of Short and Documentary film.

As the authors of the album were unhappy with the fact that they never received any information from PGP-RTS about the number of sold copies, let alone an agreed percentage of the sales, the project was offered to other local publishers in attempt to publish the album on compact disc, but none of them showed interest. Finally, after the three-year contract expired in 1998, the authors agreed to print the CD as their private issue in limited circulation, which appeared in sales at the beginning of 1999. The CD edition package featured a novella entitled Rubber Soul, originally written by Skrobonja in 1993. The novella was written as a combination of fiction and facts, with the projection of some twenty years in the future. It was illustrated with "documents" created by Rastko Ćirić. In 1994, the novella was proclaimed the best science fiction story in FR Yugoslavia.

=== The Rubber Soul Project documentary ===
The idea to create some kind of film about the Rubber Soul Project was present from the very beginnings of the project in 1993. In 1999, the authors discussed the first version of the script for a documentary movie about Rubber Soul Project with movie director Dinko Tucaković and screenwriter Srđan Koljević. From 2000 until 2004 they actively worked on the film. The documentary, entitled simply The Rubber Soul Project, was released in 2004. The film described the circumstances among which the whole idea of recording the album came, the recording process, interviews with the band members and some of the associates of the band members. It premiered at the Montpellier Film Festival, and was later screened on festivals in Belgrade, Rotterdam, Reykjavík, and other cities.

The documentary stated that a copy of the album was sent to Paul McCartney, who said he enjoyed listening to it.

=== Live performances ===
The band who joined Rastko Ćirić to perform the Rubber Soul Project songs live did not feature the musicians which recorded the album. At concerts were the musicians from the band Fathers & Sons: Boiždar Skipić (lead guitar, vocal), Branimir Kosar (keyboards), Nedeljko Kusić (bass guitar) and Nikola Đokić (drums), as well as Maja Klisinski (percussion). In 1999, they started a series of concerts, which was stopped by the NATO bombing of FR Yugoslavia. Before the beginning of the bombing, the band held concerts at the British Council Cultural Centre (16 March), the Center for Cultural Decontamination (on 19 March), Hemingway Club (on 21 March) and the Museum of Yugoslav Kinotheque (on 23 March).

On 21 April 2001, in Belgrade Museum of Applied Arts, the original Rubber Soul Project lineup, with the addition of Branko Kosar and Maja Klisinski, performed songs from the album.

In December 2005, Ćirić and Skrobonja were invited to by Liverpool Beatles Fan Club to unveil a plaque to John Lennon on the wall of Lennon Studios, formerly Liverpool Maternity Hospital (in which Lennon was born). As a part of the ceremony, Ćirić alone performed the Beatles song "Julia", and the Rubber Soul Project in the original lineup performed their song "This Is Not Here". On the evening of the same day, the band performed the songs from the album in Liverpool's The Cavern Club, in which the Beatles performed in their early days.

Besides performances in Serbia and Great Britain, the band also performed in Italy and New Zealand.

=== The Rubber Soul Project 2 ===
After the success of the debut album, Ćirić and Skrobonja began working on new tracks, writing more than 20 new songs. However, the idea was put on hiatus, before, in 2015, comic book artist Igor Kordej persuaded the two to record the follow-up to the 1996 album, even deciding to finance the recording sessions himself. Besides Ćirić, Ignjatović, Cvetković and Macura, the album recording featured Damjan Dašić and Marko Ćalić, members of the Beatles tribute band The Bestbeat. The album featured numerous guests, including Bajaga i Instruktori keyboardist Saša Lokner and keyboardist and producer Đorđe Petrović. Serbian director and author of British origin Timothy John Byford directed Ćirić in pronunciation. The new album was released by Paladin as a box set, featuring a disc with 17 new songs, a disc with the songs from the previous album, a DVD with Dinko Tucaković's documentary, and a book by Skrobonja entitled Putovanje (Journey), which describes the history of the project. The box set cover was designed by Igor Kordej.

As it was the case with the previous release, the songs on the album The Rubber Soul Project 2 were stylistically diverse: the song "Zero Is Just Another Even Number" was blues-oriented, Harrison-style "India" featured sitar, the song "In the Old Hillbilly Way" was rockabilly-oriented, and the song "Hitch Hike" was the "Ringo Starr song" sung by Macura. The song "India" featured a parrot trained to pronounce the line "Let's take a trip to India" specially for the album recording. The album featured two bonus songs, "Belgrade 2020", dedicated to Belgrade's attempt to become the 2020 European Capital of Culture, and the song "Knight of Hearts", dedicated to Igor Kordej.

In 2015, Ćirić announced that the two albums would be released as a double vinyl album.

== Discography ==
- The Rubber Soul Project (1996)
- The Rubber Soul Project 2 (2015)
