= Pavle Vasić =

Serbian painter, art historian and critic, pedagogue

Pavle Vasić (30 August 1907 – 12 March 1993) was a Serbian painter, art historian, art critic and pedagogue. One of his endeavours was to introduce designs for the reconstruction of the first Serbian uniforms.

== Biography ==
Pavle Vasić was born on 30 August 1907 in Niš, Serbia. He graduated from the Third Belgrade Gymnasium (1925) and studied painting at the Royal Art School (1922-1924) also in Belgrade. He continued to study art with Jovan Bijelić (1926–1929), and at the same time studied and graduated in jurisprudence from the University of Belgrade in 1931. He also completed his studies in art history (1947), then received his doctorate (1956) with the topic Life and work of Anastas Jovanović, the first Serbian modern lithographer and early photographer.

He was an associate and a member of the editorial board of the ArtReview and became an assistant at the National Museum in Belgrade in 1939. During World War II, he was a prisoner of war in Italy and Germany. After returning from captivity, he was briefly a clerk for fine arts and theatre at the Ministry of Education of the Socialist Federal Republic of Yugoslavia, a professor at the VII and IV Belgrade Gymnasium (1946–50), then at the Academy of Applied Arts at the University of Arts in Belgrade(1950–1968, 1978–1985), at the same time Faculty of Philosophy (1952–1963), the Academy of Music and the Academy of Dramatic Arts in Belgrade (1962–1974) and the Academy of Arts in Novi Sad (1975–1980), where he is one of the founders of the Department of Fine Arts. In addition to art history, he taught the history of costumes, drawing, painting, evening nude and the theory of form. He is the author of valuable books that are necessary manuals for generations of experts and students.

He was dedicated to art history from 1938 onwards, and achieved notable results in research into recent Serbian art. He was also among the first to point out the importance of Serbian-Russian ties for the acceptance of the Baroque in the 18th century, discovered many unknown authors and made accurate attributions and dating of works throughout Serbia. He published several reviews of Serbian and European art: "Introduction to Fine Arts", "European Art of the 17th Century", "European Art of the 18th Century", "European Art of the 19th Century", "Life and Work of Anastas Jovanović", the "First Serbian LithographePavlovićts and Weapon", "Živko Pavlović", "Požarevac Painter and His Time", Nošnja naroda Jugoslavije kroz istoriju, Dimitrije Avramović, Doba baroka, Uroš Knežević, Uniforme srpske vojske 1808–1918, Primenjena umetnost u Srbiji 1900–1978, Doba umetnosti, Doba rokokoa i umetničke topografije Sremskih Karlovaca, Sombor, Pančevo i Kruševac (Matica srpska, Novi Sad 1978, 1984, 1989 and 1990).

He became an art critic in 1929, but more seriously than the review of exhibitions published in 1938 in the ArtReview. He was a chronicler of the artistic life of Belgrade and Serbia, as a contributor to many art magazines and, especially Politika (1950–1980), for which he continued to write until 1993. He promoted many young artists and brought grades that were completely confirmed over time. He wrote many prefaces in the catalogues of solo exhibitions and monographic studies, and was the author of several thematic exhibitions and art reviews.

He left behind approximately two hundred and fifty oil paintings, thousands of watercolours, drawings, studio sketches, many illustrations, costume designs and about thirty graphics. His work belongs to the leading currents of coloristic expressionism, poetic realism and, to some extent, the socialist one in terms of the topics he dealt with. He did not paint much since the middle of the sixth decade.

He participated in about a hundred joint festivals of Serbian and Yugoslav artists (1928–1991) and exhibited independently twelve times (1973–1993).

His works are kept and exhibited by the National Museum in Belgrade, the Museum of Contemporary Art, the Historical Museum of Serbia, the Military Museum, the PTT Museum, the Museum of Theater Arts of Serbia and the Museum of the City of Belgrade, the Gallery of Matica Srpska in Novi Sad, the National Museums in Niš, Požarevac, Smederevska Palanka, Kruševac, Šabac, as well as other museums and galleries throughout Serbia.

For his many years of work and successful cooperation, he received several medals, plaques, charters, diplomas and letters of thanks from many prestigious museums, galleries and cultural institutions. In 1995, ULUPUDS{{ established the Pavle Vasić Award, and as of this year, a street in Belgrade bears his name.

== Literature ==
Vera Vasić, Popis radova dr Pavle Vasića (za period od 1928. do 1971), Zbornik za likovne umetnosti Matice srpske, br. 7, Matica srpska, Novi Sad 1971, 3–22; S. Živković, U. Rajčević and S. Bošnjak, Pavle Vasić, Castle of Culture of Vrnjačka Banja, Vrnjačka Banja 1989; L J. Miljković, Pavle Vasić witness of the epoch, National Museum, Belgrade 1993.

== Solo exhibitions ==
- 1973. Belgrade, JNA House, From a prisoner of war notebook
- 1974. Belgrade, Gallery 73, Painter and his time. Watercolours and drawings 1930–1940.
- 1977. Belgrade, Gallery of the Cultural Center of Belgrade, Paintings 1927–1965.
- 1980. Belgrade, Gallery NU Braća Stamenković, Age of Renewal. Drawings and watercolours
- 1983. Ljubovija, Ljubovija National University, Drawings and watercolours from 1947 and 1948.
- 1984. Belgrade, UP Cvijeta Zuzorić, Paintings and drawings 1927–1981. Zemun, Gallery of the JNA House, Chronicle of an Age
- 1987. Niš, National Museum Nis, Painting by Pavle Vasić (1927–1980)
- 1988. Vrnjačka Banja, Castle of Culture, Chronicle of a Painter. Drawings 1935–1982.
- 1989. Vrnjačka Banja, Castle of Culture; Čačak, Nadežda Petrović Art Gallery, Painting from the beginning of 1927–1982.
- 1993. Belgrade, National Museum, Pavle Vasić – witness of the epoch Awards/recognitions: 1936.
