= The Rubber Soul Project (album) =

The Rubber Soul Project 1

Studio album by The Rubber Soul Project
- Released: March 1996
- Genre: Rock
- Length: 45:01
- Label: PGP-RTS
- Producers: Nebojša Ignjatović; Miroslav Cvetković

Professional ratings
Review scores
Source	Rating
Allmusic	3/5 stars

THE RUBBER SOUL PROJECT (1) is imaginary Beatles album published in Belgrade, Serbia in 1996, created by the Rubber Soul Project. For 15 original songs, inspired by the titles of songs the Beatles recorded but never released, lyrics were written by author and translator Goran Skrobonja, and music composed by Rastko Ćirić. Music producers were Nebojša Ignjatović and Miroslav Cvetković. Executive Producer was Dragan Ašanin. Members of the band were Rastko Ćirić (vocals, acoustic guitar, piano), Nebojša Ignjatović (vocal, electric guitar, flute...), Miroslav Cvetković (electric bass, vocal and recording engineer), Čedomir Macura (drums, percussions and vocal), Saša Lokner (key- boards), Đorđe Petrović (string arrangement), and many guest musicians on different classical and exotic instruments like sitar, tabla, shwar-mandal, tanpura, esaraj... The RSP 1 is part of the Rubber Soul Project COLLECTION box set.

== Track listing ==
All songs written by Rastko Ćirić and Goran Skrobonja.

1. "All Together On The Wireless Machine" (2:33)
2. "Home" (2:23)
3. "Little Eddie" (2:40)
4. "I Should Like To Live Up Tree" (3:46)
5. "Shirley's Wild Accordion" (2:45)
6. "Colliding Circles" (3:05)
7. "What's The New Mary Jane" (2:28)
8. "Heather" (2:10)
9. "When I Come To Town" (2:45)
10. "Bound By Love" (3:05)
11. "Indian Rope Trick" (4:28)
12. "Four Nights in Moscow" (2:20)
13. "Thinking Of Linking" (2:30)
14. "Watching Rainbows" (3:40)
15. "Rubber Soul (3:12)

== Personnel ==
- Rastko Ćirić (lead, harmony and backing vocals, acoustic guitar on tracks 6, 8, 9, 11, 12, 14 piano on tracks 1, 2, 5, 6, 11, 13, 14, 15, block-flute on track 14, tambourine on track 15, maracas on tracks 5 and 15, whistling and laughter on track 1, Kazoos, Jingle Bells and Opera Voice on track 9, Xylophone on track 6, Knees on track 5)
- Nebojša Ignjatović - (lead and rhythm guitar, 12-strings guitar on tracks 6 and 15, acoustic guitar on tracks 4 and 7, piano on track 12, harmony vocals on tracks 5 and 9, 'Tibetan' voice on track 11, laughter on track 1, tambourine on track 12, cabassa on track 1, synthesizer on tracks 1, 5, 15, flute on track 1)
- Miroslav Cvetković ('Hoefner' violin-bass, tambourine on tracks 2, 9, guitar on tracks 7 and 15, piano bass on track 11, maracas on track 7, slide guitar on track 7, backing vocals on track 9)
- Čedomir Mačura ('Ludwig' drums, percussion on tracks 1, 14, 15, triangle on track 8, lead vocals on 9, cow bell on track 10)

=== Additional personnel ===
- Aleksandar Lokner (piano on track 7)
- Boban Novaković (piano on track 9)
- Dejan Mitrović (cello on tracks 8 and 14)
- Dragan Petrović Čupa (clarinet on track 1)
- Goran Skrobonja (reading on track 1, kicking the piano on track 9)
- Đorđe Petrović (keyboards on tracks 3, 4, 5, 7)
- Nenad Petrović (saxophone on track 3)
- Predrag Necić (trumpet on track 3)
- Kumari Pradhan (sitar on tracks 11 and 15)
- Narmani Pradhan (tabla, fadeout vocals, counting on track 11)
- Jelena Isailović (lead esaraj on track 11)
- Mahodari Takač (tanpura, mantra vocals on track 11)
- Darpada Milosavljević (shwar-mandal on track 11)
- Gordana Matijević Nedeljković (Violin on tracks 8 and 14)
- Biljana Kitanović (violin on track 14)
- Rastko Roknić (viola on tracks 8 and 14)
- Zoran Božinović (lead guitar on tracks 4 and 14)

== Promotional videos ==
There are two promotional videos for this album. One of them is for "Colliding Circles", created on Silicon Graphics platform in Softimage 3.0 by Srdjan Marković and Jelena Obradović, and for "Rubber Soul" by Aleksandara Dević on PC platform by using software such as 3D Studio 4, Adobe Premier i Ulead Media Studio.

The video for "Colliding Circles" got the Belgrade Golden Plaquette for the best mini-film at the 45th Festival of Yugoslav Documentary and Short Films in Belgrade 1998. And the "Rubber Soul" video got the YU-ASIFA Diploma for the best debutante's film at the 45th Festival of Yugoslav Documentary and Short Films in Belgrade 1998.

== Original Beatles recordings ==
All tracks were original compositions based around the titles of bootlegged or rumored Beatles songs. While bearing no resemblance to the tracks on this album, the original recordings were as follows:

1. "All Together On The Wireless Machine" - A brief, comedic ditty by Paul McCartney and Kenny Everett, with one section resembling the melody of "Hello, Goodbye."
2. "Home" - No Beatles song by this title is known to exist, though this may have been an early, incorrect title given on a bootleg to the as-yet-unreleased "Two Of Us."
3. "Little Eddie" - Also known as 'There You Are, Little Eddie', this was a McCartney improvisation from January 1969.
4. "I Should Like To Live Up A Tree" - No Beatles song by this title is known to exist; however, it is believed that this title stemmed from a late-1960s bootlegger's mishearing of lyrics belonging to the as-yet-unreleased "Octopus's Garden."
5. "Shirley's Wild Accordion" - This song was recorded during the Magical Mystery Tour sessions, featuring Shirley Evans on accordion and was eventually released on the Magical Mystery Tour DVD in 2012.
6. "Colliding Circles" - This title was a complete fabrication, included as a joke by Beatles historian Martin Lewis in a New Musical Express article detailing the Beatles' unreleased recordings.
7. "What's The New Mary Jane" - An avant-garde track recorded during the White Album sessions, which was eventually released on Anthology 3.
8. "Heather" - An improvisation by Paul McCartney and Donovan Leitch, recorded during the sessions for Mary Hopkin's Postcard album.
9. "When I Come To Town" - A working title (or incorrect title given on a bootleg) for Ringo Starr's autobiographical song "Early 1970."
10. "Bound By Love" - Also known as "The Honeymoon Song," this was performed by the Beatles during their BBC sessions.
11. "Indian Rope Trick" - Also known as "Spiritual Regeneration," this Beach Boys-flavored tune was recorded (with accompaniment by the Beach Boys' Mike Love) during the Beatles' 1968 trip to India.
12. "Four Nights In Moscow" - Another alleged working title for Ringo's "Early 1970."
13. "Thinking Of Linking" - One of the Lennon–McCartney duo's first compositions, this song was performed by the Beatles during the filming of the Beatles Anthology video series. The performance was commercially released on the DVD edition of Anthology.
14. "Watching Rainbows" - An outtake from the Let It Be sessions, improvised around a variation of the melody of "I've Got A Feeling."
15. "Rubber Soul" - A working title for the 1965 instrumental widely known as "12 Bar Original." (A heavily edited version of that instrumental appeared on Anthology 2.)
