= Gender in speculative fiction =

Gender has been an important theme explored in speculative fiction. The genres that make up speculative fiction, science fiction, fantasy, supernatural fiction, horror, superhero fiction, science fantasy and related genres (utopian and dystopian fiction), have always offered the opportunity for writers to explore social conventions, including gender, gender roles, and beliefs about gender. Like all literary forms, the science fiction genre reflects the popular perceptions of the eras in which individual creators were writing; and those creators' responses to gender stereotypes and gender roles.

Many writers have chosen to write with little or no questioning of gender roles, instead effectively reflecting their own cultural gender roles onto their fictional world. However, many other writers have chosen to use science fiction and non-realistic formats in order to explore cultural conventions, particularly gender roles. This article discusses works that have explored or expanded the treatment of gender in science fiction.

While some science fiction explores human gender experiences, there are also hypothetical alien species and robots, and imagined trans-real genders, such as with aliens that are truly hermaphroditic or have a third gender, or robots that can change gender at will or are without gender.

== Critical analysis ==
Science fiction has been described as a useful tool for examining society attitudes to and conceptions of gender; this is particularly true of literature, more so than for other media. The conventions of speculative fiction genres encourage writers to explore the subject of biological sex and present alternative models for societies and characters with different beliefs about gender. Extrapolation of an initial speculative premise can as easily start from an idea about marriage customs or chromosomes as a technological change. In spite of this potential, SF has been said to present only ideas about sex and gender that are fashionable or controversial in the present day, which it then projects into a future or fantasy setting.

Science fiction in particular has traditionally been a puritanical genre orientated toward a male readership, and has been described as being by men for men, or sometimes for boys. Most of the stereotypical tropes of science fiction, such as aliens, robots or superpowers can be employed in such a way as to be metaphors for gender.

Fantasy has been perceived as more accepting of women compared to science fiction or horror (and offering more roles than historical fiction or romance), yet seldom attempts to question or subvert the bias toward male superiority. Science fiction's tendency to look to the future and imagine different societies gives it the potential to examine gender roles and preconceptions, whereas the use of archetypes and quasi-historical settings in fantasy has often included patriarchy.

=== Portrayal of women ===
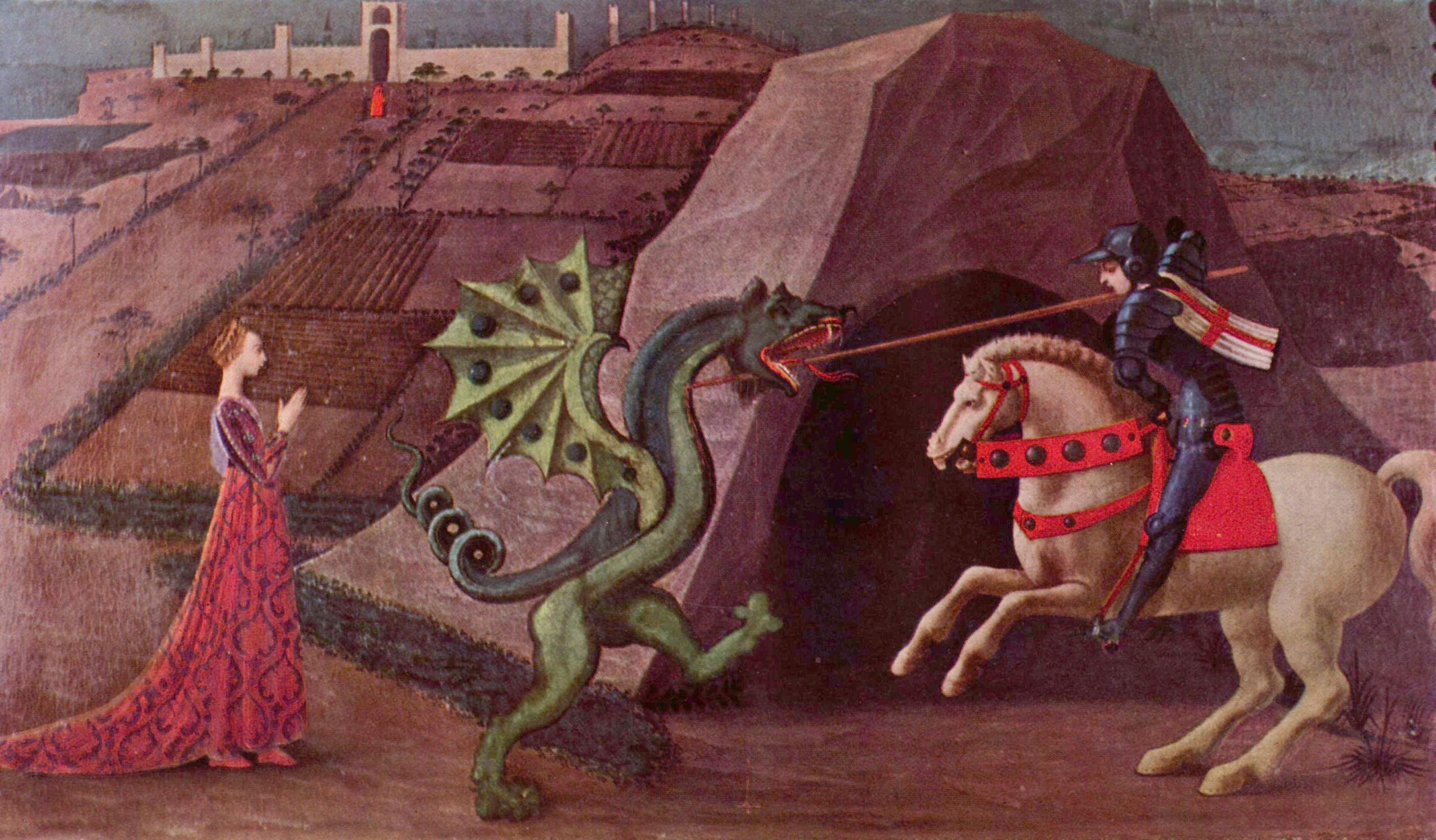
The Princess and the Dragon, Paolo Uccello, c. 1470, a classic image of a damsel in distress.

The portrayal of women, in the speculative genres, has varied widely throughout the genres' history. Some writers and artists have challenged their society's gender norms in producing their work; others have not. Among those who have challenged conventional understandings and portrayals of gender and sexuality, there have been of course significant variations. The common perception of the role of female characters in SF works has long been dominated by one of two stereotypes: a woman who is evil (villainess) or one who is helpless (damsel in distress). These characters are usually physically attractive and provocatively dressed, often in scanty armor, and require redemption and validation by a male hero. As more contemporary Speculative fiction emerges, new gender roles and a way of viewing feminine-identified beings appear with it. Viewers are seeing femininity in a new light as more female authors and fans come into the speculative fiction world. There have been female characters in forms of strong woman warriors, or even as a main character who can think for herself. Examples of these gender rules being broken can be seen in many texts such as “The Lord of the Rings” by J.R.R. Tolkien and even “The Man in the High Castle” by Philip K. Dick. As more and more readers and fans of science fiction become female identified, the portrayal of female characters changes just as speculative fiction changes.

The first critical work focusing on women in SF was Symposium: Women in Science Fiction (1975), edited by Jeffrey D. Smith, and other influential works include Future Females:A Critical Anthology (1981) edited by Marleen S. Barr.

=== Robots and cyborgs and the portrayal of women ===
A gynoid is a robot designed to look like a human female, as compared to an android modeled after a male (or genderless) human. Gynoids are "irresistibly linked" to men's lust, and are mainly designed as sex-objects, having no use beyond "pleasing men's violent sexual desires". A long tradition exists in fiction of men attempting to create the stereotypical "perfect woman". Examples include the Greek myth of Pygmalion, and the female robot Maria in Fritz Lang's Metropolis as well as the classic 1970s film The Stepford Wives. Female cyborgs have been similarly used in fiction, in which natural bodies are modified to become objects of fantasy. Fiction about gynoids or female cyborgs reinforce "essentialist ideas of feminity".

=== Portrayal of men ===
Many male protagonists of science fiction are reflections of a single heroic archetype, often having scientific vocations or interests, and being "cool, rational, competent", "remarkably sexless", interchangeable, and bland. Annette Kuhn posits that these asexual characters are attempts to gain independence from women and mother figures, and that this and their unfailing mechanical prowess is what gives them fans. The "super-male" and boy genius are also common stereotypes frequently embodied by male characters.

While fetishised objects are feminine, gender studies conclude this and masculinity, within literature, stems from sociological concepts. According to Jonathan Rutherford, masculinity’s complex nature has been oversimplified and made out to be more comprehensible than that of femininity. As such, the concept of hegemonic masculinity was a point of examination. Better known as the universal definition of today’s perception of masculinity, hegemonic masculinity suggests that there is a spectrum of masculinity as the concept stems from post-structuralism. Although masculinity tends to be defined under a singular trope of what a male protagonist should be, the majority of men do not encourage this notion. In this same fashion, the majority of men that do make an effort to reform gender roles in a multitude of societies, from neoliberal to militaristic.

Critics argue that much of science fiction fetishizes masculinity, and that incorporation of technology into science fiction provides a metaphor for imagined futuristic masculinity. Examples are the use of "hypermasculine cyborgs and console-cowboys". Such technologies are desirable as they reaffirm the readers' masculinity and protect against feminisation. This fetishisation of masculinity via technology in science fiction differs from typical fetishisation in other genres, in which the fetishised object is always feminine.

The book Spreading Misandry argues that science fiction is often used to make unfounded political claims about gender, and attempt to blame men for all of society's ills.

=== Portrayal of transgender people ===
While the ability to shift gender is common in Speculative and Science fiction, there is very little representation of transgender human characters, and they are used as little more than a plot device for the author. Male authors use the ability to change gender either speculate about medical technology or to act out an ideal of femininity. Female authors use shifting gender to discuss the condition of being woman identified. Both create trans characters as caricatures of women, rather than full humans. This is beginning to shift as more trans and queer identified authors are writing within the Sci-Fi/Speculative Fiction/Fantasy genres. Books like Beyond Binary: Gender and Sexuality in Science Fiction by Brit Mandelo examine the representation of transgender and non-binary characters in speculative fiction. Mandelo points out that these characters are often used as plot devices rather than full developed individuals, though some newer writers are working to portray gender and sexuality with greater complexity. This shift indicates a trend towards more nuanced storytelling in the genre with an increasing focus on diverse gender identities.

=== Single-gender worlds: utopias and dystopias ===
Single-gender worlds or single-sex societies have long been one of the primary ways to explore implications of gender and gender differences. In speculative fiction, female-only worlds have been imagined to come about by the action of disease that wipes out men, along with the development of technological or mystical methods that allow female parthenogenic reproduction. The resulting society is often shown to be utopian by feminist writers; however, male authors may portray these as dystopian. Many influential feminist utopias of this sort were written in the 1970s; the most often studied examples include Joanna Russ's The Female Man, Suzy McKee Charnas's Walk to the End of the World and Motherlines, and Marge Piercy's Woman on the Edge of Time. Utopias imagined by male authors have generally included equality between sexes, rather than separation. Such worlds have been portrayed most often by lesbian or feminist authors; their use of female-only worlds allows the exploration of female independence and freedom from patriarchy. The societies may not necessarily be lesbian, or sexual at all—a famous early sexless example being Herland (1915) by Charlotte Perkins Gilman. Men-only societies are much less common; one example is Athos in Ethan of Athos (1986) by Lois McMaster Bujold. Joanna Russ suggests men-only societies are not commonly imagined, because men do not feel oppressed, and therefore imagining a world free of women does not imply an increase in freedom and is not as attractive.

Utopias have been used to explore the ramification of gender being either a societal construct, or a hard-wired imperative. In Mary Gentle's Golden Witchbreed, gender is not chosen until maturity, and gender has no bearing on social roles. In contrast, Doris Lessing's The Marriages Between Zones Three, Four and Five (1980) suggests that men's and women's values are inherent to the sexes and cannot be changed, making a compromise between them essential. Sultana's Dream (1905) by Begum Rokheya Sakhawat Hossain, a writer and early Muslim feminist, is a story of Ladyland - a universe where women overrule aggressive men. In My Own Utopia (1961) by Elizabeth Mann-Borgese, gender exists but is dependent upon age rather than sex—genderless children mature into women, some of whom eventually become men. Charlene Ball writes in Women's Studies Encyclopedia that use of speculative fiction to explore gender roles in future societies has been more common in the United States compared to Europe and elsewhere.

== Literature ==
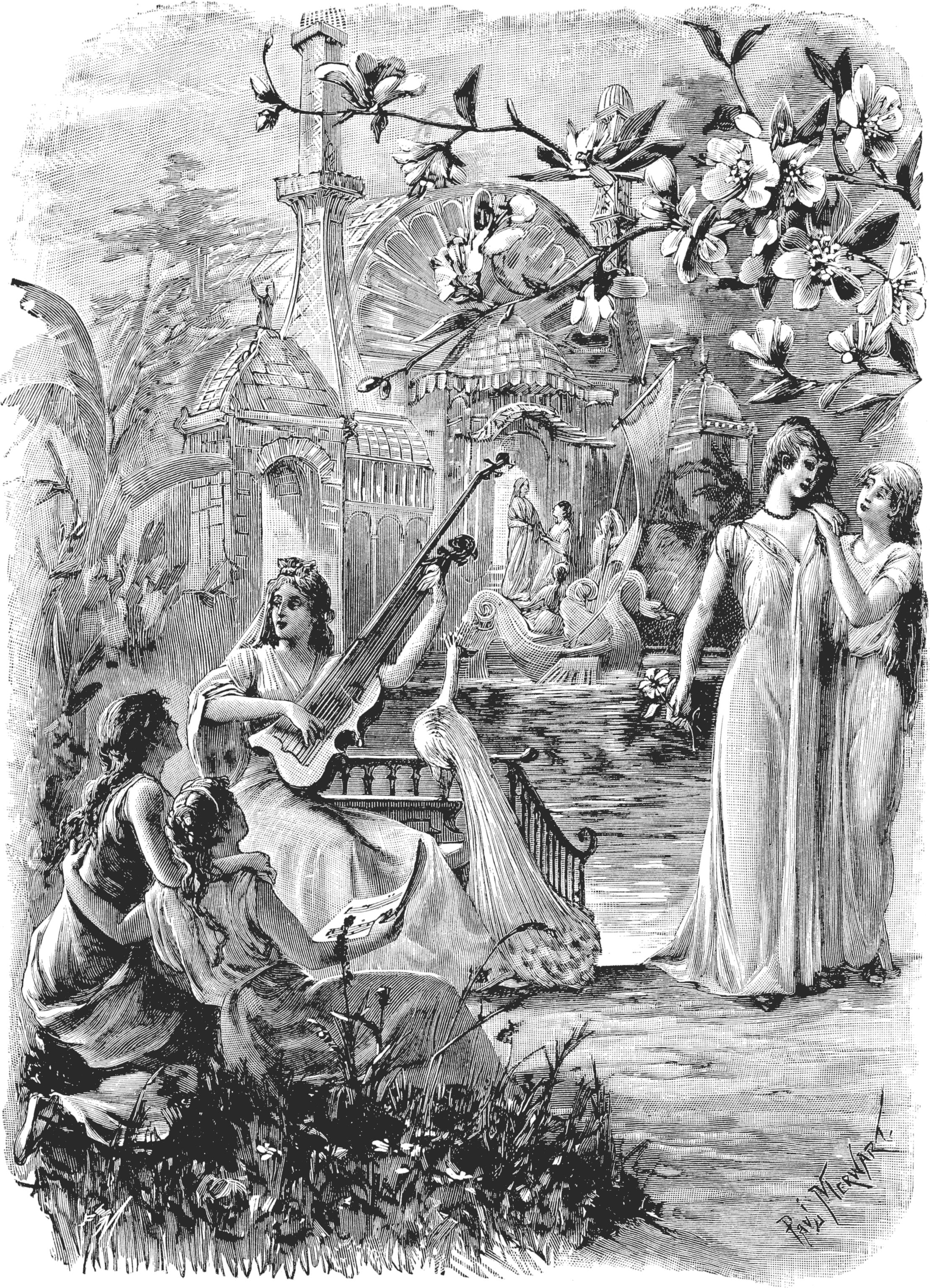
A 1911 illustration from Camille Flammarion's La fin du monde. It depicts a fictional future society in which all women are beautiful and have lovely voices.

[...] science fiction and fantasy pulp magazines were directed mainly at boys[...]. Female characters were only occasionally included in science fiction pulp stories; the male protagonists' lengthy explanations to the women with limited knowledge revealed the plots

— Eric Garber, Lyn Paleo, "Preface" in Uranian worlds.

Eric Leif Davin, for instance, documented almost 1,000 stories published in science fiction magazines by over 200 female-identified authors between 1926 and 1960.

=== Proto SF ===
In the early twentieth century, some women writers rebelled against the novels in which valiant men rescued weak women or fought against humourless, authoritarian female regimes. Charlotte Perkins Gilman wrote Herland, an important early feminist utopia, and Virginia Woolf wrote Orlando. Both Perkins and Woolf identified strongly with the first wave feminism of the period, and its call for equal rights and suffrage for women.

To that end, the driving force behind the call for gender equality originates from men's perception of women. The deviated value of women to the devaluation of feminine characteristics, these keen characteristics of misogyny characterized the fear and hatred that men had towards women. In this same vein, men's inability to hold agency over the opposite sex incurred a feeling of insignificance within themselves during a more primitive time.

Over the years, gender politics have explored the nuances and differences between gender roles to the point in which gender identity loses its significance. As such dropping gender discrimination has presented itself to be a huge step in the right direction for women’s suffrage and universal gender rights.

=== The Pulp Era and the Golden Age (1920–1950s) ===
SF portrayals of future societies remained broadly patriarchal, and female characters continued to be gender stereotyped and relegated to standardised roles that supported the male protagonists. Early feminist SF visions of all-women utopias were inverted by pulp writers to tell cautionary tales about the "sex war", in which brave men had to rescue society from joyless and dictatorial women, usually to the satisfaction of both sexes. John W. Campbell's Astounding Science Fiction was unusual in its covers not depicting men with ray guns and women with large breasts. William Knoles wrote in his 1960 Playboy article on the era, "Girls of the Slime God", that

A quivering bosom was no novel sight for a thirties s-f hero. Space Girls expressed most of their emotions through their pectoral muscle. Bosoms swayed, trembled, heaved, shivered, danced or pouted according to their owners' moods. In fact, if a hero in those days had been a little more observant and had carried a tape measure, he could have saved himself a lot of trouble. When he opened an air lock and a gorgeous stowaway fell out, uniform ripping, it usually took him five or six pages to find out whether she was a Venusian spy or not, whereas the reader knew at once. If her torn uniform revealed pouting young breasts, she was OK—probably someone's kid sister. If she had eager, straining breasts, she was the heroine. But a girl with proud, arrogant breasts was definitely a spy—while a ripe, full bosom meant she was a Pirate Queen and all hell would soon break loose.

Isaac Asimov disagreed, stating in 1969 that "until 1960 there was no branch of literature anywhere (except perhaps for the children's stories in Sunday school bulletins) as puritanical as science fiction", and that Knoles had to get his quotes from one "1938-39 magazine" which, Asimov said, published "spicy" stories for its "few readers" before "a deserved death". Floyd C. Gale in his 1962 review of Stranger in a Strange Land said that until recently "science-fictional characters owned no sexual organs".

In the 1940s, post-WWII, female writers like Judith Merril and Leigh Brackett emerged, reclaiming female characters and carving out respect in their own right. C. L. Moore is an example of a woman successfully writing pulp speculative fiction tales under a genderless pen-name. Her story "No Woman Born" (1944),^{[b]} in which a female character's mind is transferred into a powerful robot body with feminine attributes is an early example of a work that challenged gender stereotypes of its day by combining femininity with power. Brian Attebery suggest that if the robot had appeared male, the gender would have been unremarkable or even invisible to readers, as masculine figures could be expected to be powerful.

During the pulp era, unfavorable presentations of matriarchal societies, even dystopias were common. In John Wyndham's Consider Her Ways (1956), for example, male rule is described as repressive to women, but freedom from patriarchy was achieved through an authoritarian female-only society modelled on ants society.

The 1930s saw the beginnings of fantasy as a distinct publishing genre. Reacting against the hard, scientific, dehumanizing trends of contemporary science fiction, this new branch of SF drew on mythological and historical traditions and Romantic literature, including Greek and Roman mythologies, Norse sagas, the Arabian Nights and Adventure stories such as Alexandre Dumas’ Three Musketeers. The conventions brought with them a tendency toward patriarchy and cast women in restrictive roles defined as early as in the plays of Euripides. These roles included that of the "helper-maiden" or of "reproductive demon".

The 1930s also saw the advent of the sword and sorcery subgenre of pulp tales, which brought overt sexualisation to the representation of women in fantasy. Although physically more capable, female characters frequently continued to act as helpers to the male leads, but were now depicted as extremely attractive and very briefly clothed. The first female lead character of a sword and sorcery story was Jirel of Joiry, created by C. L. Moore and first appearing in "Black God's Kiss" (Weird Tales, volume 24, number 4, October 1934).

=== New Wave (1960-1970s) ===
Whereas the 1940s and 50s have been called the Golden Age of science fiction in general, the 1960s and 1970s are regarded as the most important and influential periods in the study of gender in speculative fiction.

This creative period saw the appearance of many influential novels by female authors, including Ursula K. Le Guin's The Left Hand of Darkness (1969), described as the book with which SF "lost its innocence on matters of sex and gender", and The Dispossessed (1974); Joanna Russ's most important works, particularly The Female Man (1975), regarded by many as the central work of women's SF; and The Two of Them (1978); Anne McCaffrey's prescient cyborg novel, The Ship Who Sang (1969); Vonda McIntyre's two most influential novels, The Exile Waiting (1975) and Dreamsnake (1978); Marge Piercy’s Woman on the Edge of Time (1976), the most important contribution to feminist SF by an author known mainly for realistic work; and several novels by Octavia Butler, especially Kindred (1979) and Wild Seed (1980), which have been described as groundbreaking, and established an African-American female voice in SF.

Important short stories included many by James Tiptree Jr. (a male pseudonym used by Alice Sheldon), for instance The Women Men Don't See (1973), The Girl Who Was Plugged In (1973), and The Screwfly Solution (1977).^{[c]}

These works coincided with the beginnings of application of feminist theory to SF,. creating a self-consciously feminist science fiction. Feminist SF has been distinguished from earlier feminist utopian fiction by its greater attention to characterisation and inclusion of gender equality.

Male writers also began to approach depiction of gender in new ways, with Samuel R. Delany establishing himself as the most radical voice among male SF figures for representations of alternative sexualities and gender-models in a series of major works, most importantly (with respect to gender), in Triton (1976). Gary Westfahl points out that "Heinlein is a problematic case for feminists; on the one hand, his works often feature strong female characters and vigorous statements that women are equal to or even superior to men; but these characters and statements often reflect hopelessly stereotypical attitudes about typical female attributes. It is disconcerting, for example, that in Expanded Universe Heinlein calls for a society where all lawyers and politicians are women, essentially on the grounds that they possess a mysterious feminine practicality that men cannot duplicate."

=== Modern SF (1980–2000s) ===
By the 1980s the intersection of feminism and SF was already a major factor in the production of the literature itself.

Authors such as Nicola Griffith and Sheri S. Tepper frequently write on gender-related themes. Tepper's work has been described as "the definition of feminist science fiction", and her treatment of gender has varied from early optimistic science fantasies, in which women were equally as capable as men, to more pessimistic works, including The Gate to Women's Country, in which men are the cause of war and pollution and true equality can only be achieved by transcending humanity altogether.

The Hugo, Nebula and Arthur C. Clarke Award winning Ancillary Justice by Ann Leckie (2013) portrays a society where gender is an unimportant detail in people's lives. It refers to most characters as female, unless they're talking in a different language than the dominant one. This leaves the gender of most characters unclear.

The September 2017 anthology, Meanwhile, Elsewhere, is a collection of short stories written by transgender authors about transgender characters. The anthology includes Jeanne Thornton's "Angels Are Here To Help Us", which explores access to technology, money and privilege, and Ryka Aoki's "The Gift", about a young trans girl coming out in a world where being trans is completely accepted. The book was edited by Cat Fitzpatrick and Casey Plett and was published by Topside Press.

== Comics ==
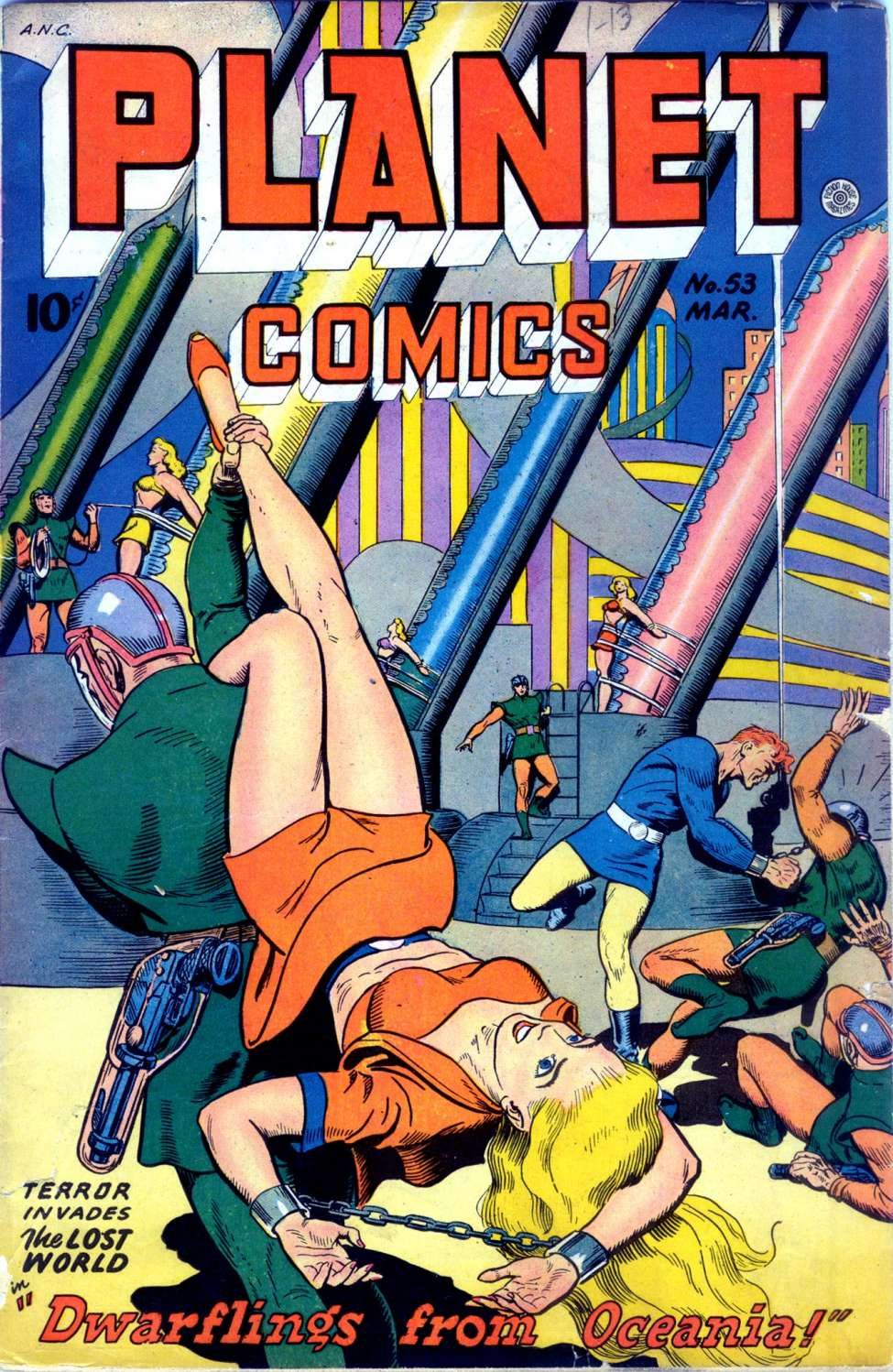
Cover of Planet comics #53

There was a time when more girls read comics than boys, but these comics were generally realist, with a focus on romance and crime stories. However, for most of their existence, comic books audiences have been assumed to be mostly male. The female characters and superheroes were targeted towards this male demographic, rather than towards women readers. Although many female superheroes were created, very few starred in their own series or achieved stand-alone success. It has been debated whether the lack of female readership was due to male writers being uncomfortable with writing about or for women, or whether the comic book industry is male dominated due to the lack of intrinsic interest of women in comics.

The first known female superhero is writer-artist Fletcher Hanks's minor character Fantomah, an ageless, ancient Egyptian woman in the modern day who could transform into a skull-faced creature with superpowers to fight evil; she debuted in 1940 in Fiction Houses Jungle Comics.

In the early 1940s the DC line was dominated by superpowered male characters such as the Green Lantern, Batman, and its flagship character, Superman. The first widely recognizable female superhero is Wonder Woman, created by William Moulton Marston for All-American Publications, one of three companies that would merge to form DC Comics. Marston intended the character to be a strong female role-model for girls, with "all the strength of Superman plus all the allure of a good and beautiful woman."

In this manner, the gender inclination of Wonder Woman has been a case of concern ever since her conception. In light of this, Wertham identified female leads in comic books to exhibit a stark contrast to female norms within the mid-century. Subsequently, female characters in comic books were perceived as frightening by readers. In turn, this archetype of female character was often referred to as “molls”. These moll characters occasionally exhibited libertine and criminal tendencies whilst demonstrating feminine agency in a fantastical setting that’s otherwise idealized by women in the society during the comic's time of publication.

== Film and television ==
=== Film ===
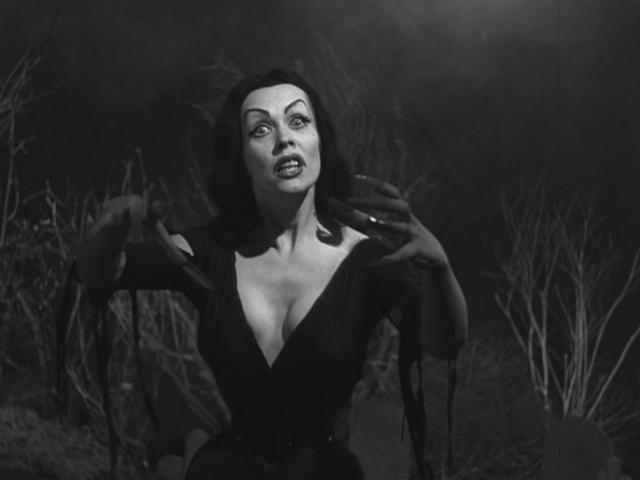
Maila Nurmi as Vampira in Plan 9 from Outer Space

Female characters in early science fiction films such as Barbarella (1968) were often portrayed as simple sex kittens.

Professor Sherrie Inness has said that the portrayals of tough women in later science fiction embody women's fantasies of empowerment, such as the characters of Sharrow in the Iain M. Banks' novel Against a Dark Background (1993) or Alex in the film Nemesis 2, who both physically overpower male attackers.

Another example would be DC Comics portrayal of Catwoman, a character represents the ideal fantasy of an empowering female character. Although the character's seductive nature is polarizing to some, Catwoman serves as a way for women to ‘realize’ the power and authority that the female audience desires in their lives. Though the domineering DC character has settled itself as the queen of hearts among female comic book readers, her skin tight jumpsuit nods at her appearance being a feast for eyes among male audiences. To that end, Catwoman doesn’t fail to play a driving force of feminist ideals in comic book literature.

=== Television ===
Early television depicted women primarily as idealized "perfect housewives" or (often black) domestic workers. By the mid-1960s and 1970s, cultural mores had relaxed, and sexual objectification of women became more commonplace. This period also saw diversification in women's roles, with blurring between the roles of middle-class housewife and working mother and the representations of women of different age, race, class, sexual orientation. The appearance of strong female characters, such as in Charlie's Angels, remained limited by associations of power with male approval.

The 1960s and 70s also saw the beginnings of SF and fantasy elements being incorporated into television programming.

Popular early SF programming in the 1960s reconciled the use of SF tropes that empowered women with stereotypes of women's social domains and femininity. This was seen in popular series such as I Dream of Jeannie and Bewitched, both of which have female protagonists with magical abilities. Bewitched's Samantha is a witch who chooses to use her abilities as a home-maker, and her husband prefers that she limits such displays of power as much as possible, particularly when they could challenge his ego. Most of her uses of magic were to save her husband appearing foolish in front of his peers or undoing interference from her more empowered and feminist mother, Endora. In contrast, the titular character of I Dream of Jeannie was inept in her house-wifely duties and was more likely to use her magic when she felt it appropriate. However, this was always in the service of her "Master", who demanded her nature as a genie be kept secret. Jeannie's subservience and skimpy clothing also identified her primarily as a sex object. Both programs showed women gaining more power and prominence through the metaphor of magic, but that this power was limited by women's willingness to obey male authority.

The 1960s also saw the first speculative presentations of women outside the realm of domestic life. Star Trek's Lt. Uhura is a famous early example of a woman space explorer, and her race made her a role-model for black women in particular. Her inclusion in the series is credited with bringing more women into science fiction fandom. The character was seen as a success of the feminist and civil rights movements of the era, representing the ideal of racial equality and women's ability to find meaningful employment outside of marriage and family. However, her role never rose beyond that of futuristic receptionist, and her uniform and prominent but generally silent placement in the background of scenes made her the series primary eye candy.

SF series of the 1970s followed in a similar vein, with speculative elements used to physically empower women, while society required that they pretend to be typical and non-threatening. Examples include The Bionic Woman and the television adaption of Wonder Woman.

Recent trends in speculative fiction now address social and political issues with a focus on feminist themes responding to contemporary events. Adaptations like Hulu's The Handmaid's Tale, based on Margaret Atwood's 1985 novel, delve into themes of reproductive rights, patriarchy, and personal autonomy, echoing modern socio-political discussions on gender and power. These adaptations demonstrate the ongoing relevance of feminist speculative fiction in times of heightened political and social discourse.

Similarly, N.K. Jemisin's Broken Earth trilogy explores oppression, race, and power dynamics within speculative settings, expanding the genre through a feminist and anti-colonial lens. Jemisin's work has been noted for tackling themes of social justice and resilience in fresh ways, while Naomi Alderman's The Power critiques historical and modern inequalities through a narrative that envisions women developing unique physical abilities.

== Global perspectives in feminist speculative fiction ==
While much of feminist speculative fiction highlights Western authors, a growing body of work from around the world introduces diverse cultural perspectives. The Postworld In-Between Utopia and Dystopia: Intersectional, Feminist, and Non-Binary Approaches in 21st-Century Speculative Literature and Culture showcases a range of feminist, intersectional, and non-binary viewpoints from both Western and non-Western authors. This collection explores how gender and intersectionality are portrayed in speculative fiction, providing insights into feminist utopian and dystopian narratives that reflect broader global viewpoints.

Authors like Nalo Hopkinson from Jamaica and Nnedi Okorafor from Nigeria bring unique perspectives to speculative fiction, often incorporating cultural heritage and folklore to address universal themes of gender, power, and identity. Their works contribute to a wider understanding of gender issues across varied cultural contexts.

== Notes ==
^{a} SF is used throughout as an abbreviation for speculative fiction, for convenience. Science fiction and slash fiction are written in full when referred to specifically.
^{b} Collected in Two-Handed Engine: The Selected Stories of Henry Kuttner and C. L. Moore
^{c} Collected in Her Smoke Rose Up Forever.

== Sources ==
- Attebery, Brian (2002). Decoding Gender in Science Fiction. Routledge. ISBN 978-0-415-93950-8.
- Romaine, Suzanne (1999). Communicating gender. Lawrence Erlbaum Associates. p. 329. ISBN 978-0-8058-2926-6.
- Larbalestier, Justine (2002). The Battle of the Sexes in Science Fiction. Wesleyan University Press. ISBN 0-8195-6527-X.
- Helford, Elyce Rae (2000). Fantasy Girls: Gender in the New Universe of Science Fiction and Fantasy Television. Rowman & Littlefield. ISBN 978-0-8476-9835-6.
- Bartter, Martha A. (2004). The utopian fantastic: selected essays from the twentieth ICFA. Greenwood Publishing Group. ISBN 978-0-313-31635-7.
- Kuhn, Annette (2000). Cultural Theory and Contemporary Science Fiction Cinema. Verso. ISBN 978-0-86091-993-3.
- Roberts, Robin (1993). A New Species: Gender and Science in Science Fiction. Urbana: University of Illinois Press.
- Noonan, Bonnie (2005). Women scientists in fifties science fiction films. McFarland & Co. ISBN 978-0-7864-2130-5.

== See also ==
- Android – Robot resembling a human
- Gynoid – Humanoid robot resembling a woman
