= Battle of the sexes in science fiction =

Fictional conflicts between male and female societies

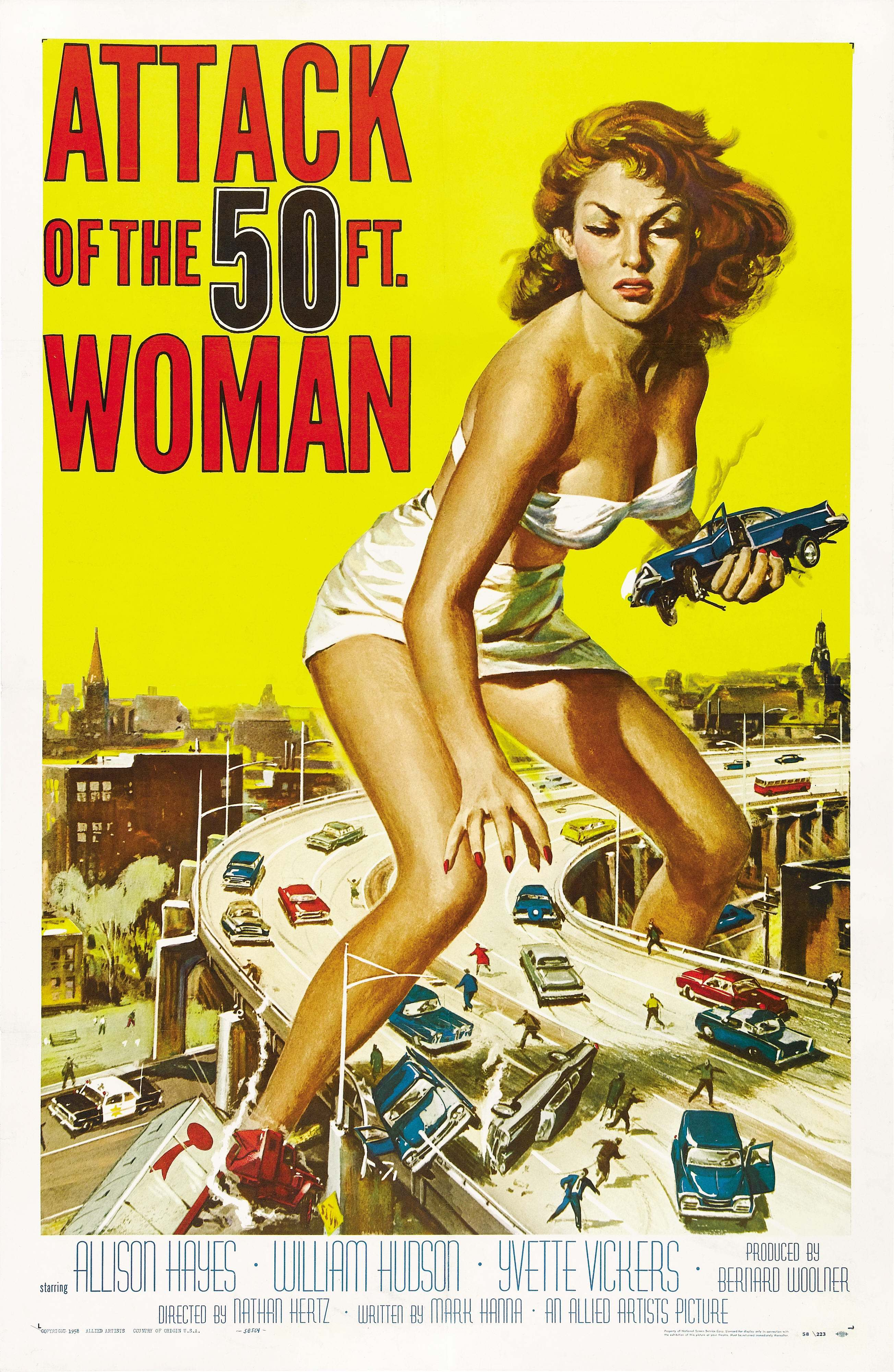
Attack of the 50-Foot Woman, a 1958 film about a feminist revolt against men.

The battle of the sexes in science fiction is a recurring trope involving conflicts between male and female societies in a science fiction scenario over power.

With the rise of feminist science fiction, women science fiction writers have subverted the literary treatment of the battle of the sexes, first by presenting feminist utopias of single-gender worlds, then with the rise of cyberfeminism by going beyond the binary vision of societies organised solely between men and women.

== Definition ==
The expression "battle of the sexes" was first used by Joanna Russ to refer to science fiction stories dealing with the "war of the sexes" between men and women. These are stories in which women rebel and take power, and in which there is usually a male hero who, with the help of a "feminine" woman, brings peace to the world and restores balance.

== History ==
Helen Merrick described the battle of the sexes trope in science fiction, which arose with the rise of feminist issues in society. Also known as "dominant woman" stories, "battle of the sexes" stories often feature matriarchal societies in which women have overcome their patriarchal oppressors and achieved dominance. These stories are representative of an anxiety that perceives women's power as a threat to masculinity and the heterosexual norm. As Merrick explains, "And while they may at least hint at a vision of a more egalitarian gendered social order, this possibility is undermined by framing the female desire for greater equality in terms of a (stereotypically) male drive for power and domination". Joanna Russ has attempted to define another, more feminist approach to the battle of the sexes, which she defines as a "battle of the sexes" with a more egalitarian or androgynous approach.

=== 1920s ===
Examples of these types of stories, written in the 1920s and 1930s throughout the 1950s, include Francis Steven's Friend Island and Margaret Rupert's Via the Hewitt Ray; in 1978, Marion Zimmer Bradley published The Ruins of Isis, a novel about a futuristic matriarchy on a planet colonised by humans where men are extremely oppressed. In the world of Marion Zimmer Bradley's Darkover, the author introduces a broad autonomy for women represented through the Free Amazon people and the prospect of homosexual relationships.

=== 1960 - 1970 ===
In the 1960s and 1970s, feminist science fiction writers shifted from the battle of the sexes to writing more egalitarian stories and stories that sought to make the feminine more visible. Ursula Le Guin's Left Hand of Darkness depicts an androgynous society in which a genderless world could be imagined. In James Tiptree Jr.'s short novel Houston, Houston, do you read? (published in the anthology Aurora: Beyond Equality), women can be seen in their full humanity due to the absence of men in a post-apocalyptic society. Joanna Russ's works, notably When It Changed and The Female Man, are further examples of an exploration of what it is to be a woman and a ‘deconstruction of the acceptable, liberal "whole" woman into multiple and shifting postmodern possible occurrences of a female individuality.

=== "Amor Vincit Foeminam: The Battle of the Sexes in Science Fiction" ===
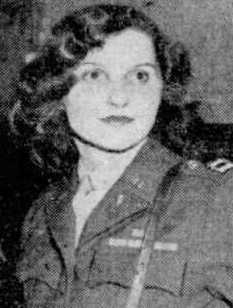
Alice Sheldon, aka James Tiptree Jr

Joanna Russ tackled the subject of the battle of the sexes in a 1980 article entitled "Amor Vincit Foeminam: The Battle of the Sexes in Science Fiction", which listed the various postures taken by science fiction writers for this recurring theme and its implications for the participation of women in science fiction. This essay further prompted Justine Larbalestier to publish a thesis and then a book on the subject.

Joanna Russ examined ten stories in her essay, including:

- Thomas Berger, Regiment of Women, Simon & Schuster, 1973.
- Nelson S. Bond, "The Priestess Who Rebelled", in When Women Rule (originally published in Amazing Stories, October 1939)
- Edmund Cooper, Gender Genocide, Ace Books, 1971 (originally published as Who Needs Men?)
- Parley J. Cooper, The Feminists, Pinaccle, 1971
- Thomas S. Gardner, "The Last Women", in Wonder Stories, 1932
- David H. Keller, "The Feminine Metamorphosis", in When Women Rule (originally published in Science Wonder Stories, August 1929.)
- Keith Laumer, "War Against the Yukks", Galaxy, April 1965.
- Bruce McAllister, "Ecce Femina!", in Fantasy and Science Fiction, February 1972.
- Booth Tarkington, "The Veiled Feminists of Atlantis", in When Women Rule (first published in The Forum in March 1926.)
- James Tiptree Jr., "Mama Come Home", in Ten Thousand Light-Years from Home, New York: Ace, 1973 (first published in If in 1968 under the title "The Mother Ship")
- Wallace G. West, "The Last Man", in When Women Rule, first published in Amazing Stories, February 1929

Of most of these short stories, Russ wrote :

I think it's clear now that these stories were not only not written for women, they're not about women either. To quote Michael Korda in Male Chauvinism: men don't normally hate women.... They just don't want to hear about them.

The only short story that Russ endorsed on a feminist point of view was the one written by James Tiptree Jr..

=== 2000s ===
The cyber-feminists of the next generation followed up with ideas questioning femininity or the very existence of a biological substratum condemning women to the state of damsels in distress. Donna Harraway wrote:

There is nothing about being a "woman" that naturally binds women together. There is not even such a thing as "being" a woman, which is itself a highly complex category constructed in contested scientific discourses and other social practices.

She explains that communities are built on affinity rather than identity.

This is a direction taken in "fempunk" stories: describing communities of affinity that do not rely on segregation by gender, but describe characters who have to rely on their skills in confronting men and women to survive, emphasising the fluidity and resilience of the characters. Authors such as Kameron Hurley (God's War), Lauren Beukes (Zoo City), and Madeline Ashby (vN: The First Machine Dynasty) have, according to Marianne de Pierres, endeavoured to imagine different worlds to incorporate women's autonomy, not limiting themselves to roles presented through a binary male/female gender prism to describe complex social behaviours and communities.
