= Byte Beautiful: Eight Science Fiction Stories =

- First edition cover
- Author: James Tiptree, Jr.
- Cover artist: Laurie Dolphin
- Language: English
- Genre: Science fiction
- Publisher: Doubleday
- Publication date: November 1985
- Publication place: United States
- Pages: xiv + 177
- ISBN: 0-385-19653-9
- OCLC: 12049942
- Dewey Decimal: 813/.54 19
- LC Class: PS3570.I66 B9 1985

Byte Beautiful: Eight Science Fiction Stories is a 1985 science fiction short story collection by American writer James Tiptree, Jr. All the stories, with the exception of "Excursion Fare", had previously appeared in earlier short story collections by Tiptree.

== Contents ==
- "With Delicate Mad Hands" (novella) (Out of the Everywhere and Other Extraordinary Visions, 1981.)
- "Beam Us Home" (Galaxy Science Fiction, April, 1969.)
- "Love Is the Plan the Plan Is Death" (The Alien Condition, 1973.)
- "The Man Who Walked Home" (Amazing Stories, May, 1972.)
- "Your Faces, O My Sisters! Your Faces Filled of Light!" (Aurora: Beyond Equality, 1976.)
- "The Peacefulness of Vivyan," (Amazing Stories, July, 1971.)
- "Excursion Fare," (novelette) (Stellar, #7, 1981.)
- "I'll Be Waiting for You When the Swimming Pool Is Empty" (Protostars, 1971.)
