= Crown of Stars =

Short story collection by James Tiptree, Jr.

- First edition
- Author: Alice Sheldon (as James Tiptree, Jr.)
- Cover artist: Dave Archer
- Language: English
- Genre: Science fiction Speculative fiction
- Publisher: Tor Books
- Publication date: September 1988
- Publication place: United States
- Media type: Print (hardback & paperback)
- Pages: 340
- ISBN: 0-312-93105-0
- OCLC: 18136746
- Dewey Decimal: 813/.54 19
- LC Class: PS3570.I66 C76

Crown of Stars is a posthumous collection by American writer James Tiptree, Jr., containing unpublished short stories and those published in the final years of her career. All but one of the stories ("Come Live With Me") had previously been published elsewhere, in Science fiction magazines or anthologies. It is copyrighted to “the Estate of Alice B. Sheldon” and was first published in 1988 by Tom Doherty Associates. Crown of Stars is 340 pages in length and contains ten short stories.

== Contents ==
- "Second Going" (1987)

Narrated as a documentary from NASA’s chief archivist, it describes humanity’s First Contact. Interstellar-wandering, telepathic aliens contact Earth after we launch our first crewed mission to Mars, stating that they will meet with the astronauts once they arrive. The Angli (large, blue cephalopods) turn out to be benevolent, if technologically simple, space tourists. They are interested in spending several months exploring Earth, then moving on. They are puzzled, though, by the lack of living gods on Earth; which exist on every other planet they have visited.

- "Our Resident Djinn" (1986)

"Our Resident Djinn" opens cold with the death of God. Satan has just gotten the news of his rival's death from an angelic messenger and decides the best thing would be for him to fly up to the heavenly kingdom to pay his last respects to his old adversary. St. Peter gives Satan a tour of the empty capitol, which is to be sold off piecemeal in a sort of divine Chapter 7 Bankruptcy.

- "Morality Meat" (1985, credited to Raccoona Sheldon)

"Morality Meat" is the tale of a 16-year-old black girl living in a right-wing, dystopian future California. After being raped, she has no choice but to become a single mother, since abortions are illegal. She is forced to give her baby up for adoption, since she cannot afford to feed two.

- "All This and Heaven Too" (1985)

“All This and Heaven Too” is about young lovers, fairy-tale geopolitics, and ridiculous court intrigue. Set in a happy, utopian kingdom and an adjacent polluted, industrial kingdom, the principalities’ heirs fall in love.

- "Yanqui Doodle" (1987)

The US is fighting a full-fledged war in Latin-America and the Congressional Armed Services Committee is on a tour of the front and will soon stop at a field hospital to visit the wounded. Soldiers are encouraged to take government-issued drugs (mainly amphetamines) to become remorseless killing machines. A soldier is recovering from a landmine explosion in this field hospital and it quickly becomes clear that drug withdrawal is a far more serious concern than his wounds.

- "Come Live with Me" (1988)

"Come Live With Me," is one of the last stories written by Tiptree. It is the only story in this collection regarding the far future and deep space. It's a quick, simple tale of a deep-space exploration crew's encounter with a mind-controlling lily, mainly from the plant's perspective. The plant has never encountered a being more intelligent than a space beaver, so meeting humans and their egos is a big change.

- "Last Night and Every Night" (1970)
- "In Midst of Life" (1987)

Both are about humans who are transformed into Death’s servants.

- "Backward, Turn Backward" (1988)'

The tale of a riches-to-rags debutante, Diane, who temporarily changes places with her future self. A few months after this was written, Alice Sheldon shot her husband, then herself, in their bed, which was somewhat prefigured by the story.

- "The Earth Doth Like a Snake Renew" (1988) [Written in 1973 by Raccoona Sheldon]

"The Earth Doth Like a Snake Renew," is a reversal of the earlier Tiptree story, "The Last Flight of Doctor Ain," her first widely acclaimed piece. In this story, the Earth is male and the main character is a young woman named "P." P is in love with the Earth and obsessively desires to find a way to physically consummate that love. She is also a submissive masochist. The relationship between the two is portrayed as abusive, with the Earth harming and manipulating the protagonist, while simultaneously providing for her. Ultimately, the Earth is shown to not truly love her, but, rather, to love another planetoid. This planetoid crashes into the Earth, knocking it off its orbit and killing all life, including P.

== Reception ==
Crown of Stars received a nomination for the 1989 Locus Award for Best Collection. The story "Come Live with Me," the only original story in the collection, was the winner of the Hayakawa Award for foreign short story in 1997.
