= Her Smoke Rose Up Forever =

1990 collection of stories by James Tiptree, Jr.

- Dust-jacket illustration by Andrew Smith.
- Author: James Tiptree, Jr.
- Illustrator: Andrew Smith
- Cover artist: Andrew Smith
- Language: English
- Genre: Science fiction
- Publisher: Arkham House
- Publication date: June 1990
- Publication place: United States
- Media type: Print (hardback)
- Pages: xv + 520
- ISBN: 0-87054-160-9
- OCLC: 21194856
- Dewey Decimal: 813/.54 20
- LC Class: PS3570.I66 A6 1990

Her Smoke Rose Up Forever is a collection of science fiction stories by American author James Tiptree, Jr. It was originally released in 1990 by Arkham House, in an edition of 4,108 copies and was the author's second book published by Arkham House. It was later released to a wider audience in paperback form in 2004 from Tachyon Publications.

== Contents ==
Her Smoke Rose Up Forever contains the following stories:

1. "Introduction" by John Clute
2. The Green Hills of Earth
  - "The Last Flight of Dr. Ain" (1969)
  - "The Screwfly Solution" (1977)
3. The Boundaries of Humanity
  - "And I Awoke and Found Me Here on the Cold Hill's Side" (1972)
  - "The Girl Who Was Plugged In" (1973)
  - "The Man Who Walked Home" (1972)
  - "And I Have Come Upon This Place By Lost Ways" (1972)
4. Male and Female
  - "The Women Men Don't See" (1973)
  - "Your Faces, O My Sisters! Your Faces Filled of Light!" (1976)
  - "Houston, Houston, Do You Read?" (1976)
5. Star Songs
  - "With Delicate Mad Hands" (1981)
  - "A Momentary Taste of Being" (1975)
  - "We Who Stole the Dream" (1978)
6. Life and Death
  - "Her Smoke Rose Up Forever" (1974)
  - "Love Is the Plan the Plan Is Death" (1973)
  - "On the Last Afternoon" (1972)
  - "She Waits for All Men Born" (1976)
  - "Slow Music" (1980)
7. Epilogue: And Man Abides...
  - "And So On, and So On" (1971)

== Sources ==
- Chalker, Jack L.; Mark Owings (1998). The Science-Fantasy Publishers: A Bibliographic History, 1923-1998. Westminster, MD and Baltimore: Mirage Press, Ltd. p. 58.
- Joshi, S.T. (1999). Sixty Years of Arkham House: A History and Bibliography. Sauk City, WI: Arkham House. pp. 160–161. ISBN 0-87054-176-5.
- Nielsen, Leon (2004). Arkham House Books: A Collector's Guide. Jefferson, NC and London: McFarland & Company, Inc. p. 136. ISBN 0-7864-1785-4.
