= Warm Worlds and Otherwise =

1975 short story collection by Alice Sheldon

- First edition
- Author: Alice Sheldon (as James Tiptree Jr.)
- Cover artist: Don R. Smith
- Language: English
- Genre: Science fiction
- Publisher: Ballantine
- Publication date: February 1975
- Publication place: United States
- Media type: Print (paperback)
- Pages: xviii + 222
- ISBN: 0-345-24380-3
- OCLC: 1259947

Warm Worlds and Otherwise is a short story collection by American writer Alice Sheldon, first published in 1975 under her pen name James Tiptree Jr. In its introduction, "Who is Tiptree, What is He?", fellow science fiction author Robert Silverberg wrote that he found the theory that Tiptree was female "absurd", and that the author of these stories could only be a man. After Sheldon wrote him that Tiptree was a pseudonym she assumed, Silverberg added a postscript to his introduction in the second edition of the book, published in 1979.

According to David Pringle, the collection contains:

Twelve furiously imaginative, occasionally explosive SF stories, the best of which are quite brilliant

== Contents ==
- "Who Is Tiptree, What Is He?" (introduction by Robert Silverberg)
- "All the Kinds of Yes"
- "The Milk of Paradise"
- "And I Have Come Upon This Place by Lost Ways"
- "The Last Flight of Dr. Ain"
- "Amberjack"
- "Through a Lass Darkly"
- "The Girl Who Was Plugged In" (winner of the Hugo Award for novella in 1974)
- "The Night-Blooming Saurian"
- "The Women Men Don't See"
- "Fault"
- "Love Is the Plan the Plan Is Death" (winner of the Nebula Award for short story in 1974)
- "On the Last Afternoon"

== Sources ==
- Pringle, David. The Ultimate Guide to Science Fiction. London: Grafton Books, 1990. ISBN 0-246-13635-9.
