= Brightness Falls from the Air =

1985 novel by James Tiptree Jr.

- First edition
- Author: James Tiptree Jr.
- Cover artist: Joe Bergeron
- Language: English
- Genre: Science fiction
- Publisher: Tor Books
- Publication date: February 1985
- Publication place: United States
- Media type: Print (Hardcover and Paperback)
- Pages: 382
- ISBN: 0-312-93097-6
- OCLC: 12810905

Brightness Falls from the Air is a 1985 science fiction novel by American writer James Tiptree Jr., set in the same fictional universe as the stories in her 1986 collection The Starry Rift.

== Synopsis ==
In a setup which has been compared to a country house murder mystery, the novel tells the story of sixteen humans who gather on the isolated planet Damiem to witness the passage of a nova front from the Murdered Star; over the course of the book, the truth about the motives of these tourists, the destruction of the star, and the reason for Damiem's isolation are revealed.

== Reception ==
Tiptree's two novels have received less attention than her short fiction: one publication claiming that Tiptree had less control over her intense vision at novel length is The Encyclopedia of Science Fiction, which criticises "moments of overt sentimentality" and "excesses of subplotting" in Brightness Falls from the Air. Tiptree's biographer, Julie Phillips, felt that the greater conventionality of this novel was a response to Algis Budrys's criticism of her plots, which Phillips thinks she took too much to heart.

Graham Sleight, writing for Locus Magazine, disagrees with aspects of Phillips's and Clute's assessment of the novel, arguing that Tiptree's work from after the revelation of her identity has not received appropriate consideration. While he calls Brightness Falls from the Air a melodrama, he argues that it possesses "extraordinary power" and that Tiptree "has an attentiveness in this book to other issues, most obviously the visual, that she doesn't have elsewhere."

David Langford reviewed Brightness Falls from the Air for White Dwarf #85, and stated that "Few survive the meagre scatter of happy endings. In retrospect I don't believe a word of it, but Tiptree pours so much energy into her narrative that against all reason it sweeps you away. Phew, what a scorcher..."

A Japanese translation issued by Hayakawa Publishing won the 2008 Seiun Award for best foreign novel.
