= And I Awoke and Found Me Here on the Cold Hill's Side =

- Short story by James Tiptree, Jr.
- Cover of 1990 reprint anthology including this story
- Country: United States
- Language: English
- Genre: Science fiction

Publication
- Published in: The Magazine of Fantasy & Science Fiction
- Publication type: Magazine
- Publication date: March 1972

"And I Awoke and Found Me Here on the Cold Hill's Side" is a science fiction short story by American author James Tiptree, Jr. Originally published in The Magazine of Fantasy & Science Fiction, the short story has been republished in several anthologies.

Its title is a quote from John Keats' 1819 poem La Belle Dame Sans Merci.

== Plot ==
In the far future humanity has begun to interact with aliens from all over the galaxy. A journalist has arrived on a space station in hopes of photographing an alien ship. He encounters a station engineer who tells him about his past and issues him a warning.

When the engineer was a young pre-med student he became obsessed with aliens despite watching similar obsessions result in death or permanent physical and mental harm. The engineer sacrificed a promising medical career in order to obtain an unfulfilling one that would allow him to go into space. He has also spent more money than he should wooing generally uninterested aliens.

He warns the journalist that aliens do not interact with other alien species and do not seek out humans either. The humans instead come to them, driven by their obsession and willing to act as menial servants for even aliens deemed failures by their own species. The aliens rarely take humans as sexual partners and never as romantic ones. The engineer theorizes that this obsession, which he views as uncontrollable due to humanity's sex drive, has dramatically reduced the birth rate. He also implies that aliens hold humanity in low regard due to their continued destruction of Earth.

The engineer's wife arrives, heavily scarred and fatigued from interactions with the aliens. He reveals that theirs is a loveless marriage of convenience, as the station exclusively hires married couples. The agreement allows them to pursue aliens, even as both seem aware of the negative repercussions. The engineer begs the journalist to return to Earth and warn others to stay away from aliens. The story ends with the infatuated journalist choosing instead to pursue his first interaction with aliens.

== Publications ==
"And I Awoke and Found Me Here on the Cold Hill's Side" was originally published in The Magazine of Fantasy & Science Fiction's March 1972 edition. Since then it has been reprinted in numerous anthologies over the years:

- The Magazine of Fantasy and Science Fiction, March 1972
- Ten Thousand Light-Years from Home by James Tiptree, Jr. (1973)
- Space Odysseys edited by Brian W. Aldiss (1974)
- Aliens! edited by Jack M. Dann and Gardner Dozois (1980)
- Alien Sex edited by Ellen Datlow (1990)
- Her Smoke Rose Up Forever by James Tiptree, Jr. (1990)
- Invaders! edited by Jack Dann and Gardner Dozois (1993)
- Daughters of Earth: Feminist Science Fiction in the Twentieth Century edited by Justine Larbalestier (2006)
- A Science Fiction Omnibus edited by Brian Aldiss (2007)
- The Wesleyan Anthology of Science Fiction (2010)
- Nebula Awards Showcase 2012 edited by James Patrick Kelly and John Kessel (2012)

An audiobook adaptation of the story was released in 2020 as part of the anthology Her Smoke Rose Up Forever, which was narrated by Dina Pearlman and Adam Grupper.

== Themes ==
Themes in the story include xenophobia and human sexual desire and its destructive side. Graham Sleight has stated that "The story told by one of the humans argues that we will always be profoundly needy because of our desire to explore and discover the new, and that our neediness will be expressed through our sexual desires."

== Reception ==
Sleight reviewed the story as part of Her Smoke Rose Up Forever for Locus Online, noting that it is "a brilliant inversion of the SF staples about humanity winning out because of being the grittiest/toughest/smartest species on the block."

=== Awards ===
- 1973 Hugo Award for Best Short Story—Nominated
- 1973 Nebula Award for Best Short Story—Nominated
- 1973 Locus Magazine Poll Award for Best Short Fiction—Fourth Place

== In popular culture ==
Artist Brittany Nelson has created a series of prints entitled "And I Awoke Found Me Here On The Cold Hill’s Side #1-6", each of which feature a page of Tiptree's story
