= Meet Me at Infinity =

First edition, cover art by John Harris

Meet Me At Infinity: The Uncollected Tiptree: Fiction and Nonfiction is a collection of short stories and essays by James Tiptree, Jr., edited by David G. Hartwell and with an introduction by Jeffrey D. Smith, longtime friend of Tiptree and literary trustee of her estate. The book was originally published by Tor Books in 2000.

This collection notably collects several nonfiction pieces that were previously only available in small fanzines or other hard-to-find places, including the only interview Tiptree conducted before her identity was revealed.

== Contents ==
The contents of the book are divided into two sections.

1. Meet Me At Infinity: Uncollected Fiction

- "Happiness is a Warm Spaceship"
- "Please Don't Play with the Time Machine, or, I Screwed 15,924 Back Issues of Astounding for the F.B.I"
- "A Day Like Any Other"
- "Press Until the Bleeding Stops"
- "Go from Me, I Am One of Those Who Pall (A Parody of My Style)"
- "The Trouble Is Not in Your Set"
- "Trey of Hearts"
- "The Color of Neanderthal Eyes"

2. Letters from Yucatán and Other Points of the Soul: Uncollected Nonfiction

- "If You Can't Laugh at It, What Good is It?" interview by Jeffrey D. Smith
- "In the Canadian Rockies"
- "I Saw Him"
- "Spitting Teeth, Our Hero"
- "Do You Like It Twice?"
- "The Voice from the Baggie"
- "Maya Maloob"
- "Looking Inside Squirmy Authors"
- "Comment on 'The Last Flight of Doctor Ain'"
- "Afterword to 'The Milk of Paradise'"
- "Afterword to 'Her Smoke Rose Up Forever'"
- "Introduction to 'The Night-blooming Saurian'"
- "The Laying On of Hands"
- "Going Gently Down, or, In Every Young Person There Is an Old Person Screaming to Get Out"
- "The Spooks Next Door"
- "Harvesting the Sea"
- "More Travels, or, Heaven is Northwest of You"
- "With Tiptree Through the Great Sex Muddle"
- "Quintana Roo: No Travelog This Trip"
- "Review" The Lathe of Heaven by Ursula K. Le Guin"
- "How to Have an Absolutely Hilarious Heart Attack, or, So You Want to Get Sick in the Third World"
- "The First Domino"
- "Everything But the Signature is Me"
- "The Lucky Ones"
- "Something Breaking Down"
- "Dzo'oc U Ma'an U Kinil -- Incident on the Cancun Road, Yucatan"
- "Not a New Zealand Letter"
- "Biographical Sketch for Contemporary Authors"
- "Contemporary Authors Interview" by Jean W. Ross
- "S.O.S. Found in an SF Bottle"
- "Note on 'Houston, Houston, Do You Read?'"
- "How Do You Know You're Reading Philip K. Dick?"
- "Review: Kayo: The Authentic and Annotated Autobiographical Novel from Outer Space by James McConkey"
- "Zero at the Bone"
- "A Woman Writing Science Fiction"
