= The Starry Rift (Tiptree book) =

1986 short story collection by James Tiptree, Jr

- First edition cover
- Author: James Tiptree, Jr
- Cover artist: Dave Archer
- Language: English
- Genre: Science fiction
- Published: 1986 by Tor Books
- Publication place: United States
- Media type: Print (hardback & paperback)
- Pages: 250 pp
- Awards: 1986 Locus Magazine Poll Award for Best Novella; 1986 SF Chronicle Award for Best Novella
- ISBN: 978-0-3129-3744-7
- OCLC: 13715581
- Dewey Decimal: 813.54
- LC Class: PS3570.I66

The Starry Rift is a linked science fiction short story collection by James Tiptree, Jr first published in 1986 by Tor Books. It takes place in the same universe as several other works by Tiptree, most notably her 1985 novel Brightness Falls from the Air.

== Contents ==
The Starry Rift contains the following stories:

- "In the Great Central Library of Deneb University"
- "The Only Neat Thing to Do" (Originally published in The Magazine of Fantasy & Science Fiction, October 1985)
  - This novella has been widely referenced in Japanese pop culture, such as song titles and the anime Neon Genesis Evangelion, The Melancholy of Haruhi Suzumiya, & Zoku Owarimonogatari.
- "Good Night, Sweethearts" (Originally published in The Magazine of Fantasy & Science Fiction, March 1986)
- "Collision" (Originally published in Isaac Asimov's Science Fiction Magazine, May 1986)

== Awards ==
Though the collection itself did not garner any awards, the short story "The Only Neat Thing to Do" received several honors and nominations.

- 1986 Nebula Award for Best Novella — Nominated
- 1986 SF Chronicle Award for Best Novella — Won
- 1986 Hugo Award for Best Novella — Nominated
- 1986 Locus Magazine Poll Award for Best Novella — First Place
