= Star Songs of an Old Primate =

- First edition
- Author: Alice Sheldon (as James Tiptree, Jr.)
- Cover artist: Darrell K. Sweet
- Language: English
- Genre: Science fiction
- Publisher: Del Rey Books
- Publication date: 1978
- Publication place: United States
- Media type: Print (paperback)
- Pages: xii+270
- ISBN: 0-345-25417-1
- OCLC: 3034692

Star Songs of an Old Primate is the third short story collection by Alice Sheldon (under the pen name James Tiptree, Jr.). It was published by Del Rey Books (a specialized SF and Fantasy imprint of Ballantine Books) in 1978. It was the first of Tiptree's books published after the revelation that Tiptree was female, rather than male, writer.

== Contents ==
- Introduction by Ursula K. Le Guin
- "Your Haploid Heart" (First published in Analog Science Fiction and Fact, September 1969.)
- "And So On, And So On"
- "Her Smoke Rose Up Forever" (First published in Final Stage edited by Edward L. Ferman and Barry N. Malzberg.)
- "A Momentary Taste of Being" (First published in The New Atlantis edited by Robert Silverberg.)
- "Houston, Houston, Do You Read?" (First published in Aurora: Beyond Equality edited by Susan Janice Anderson and Vonda N. McIntyre.)
- "The Psychologist Who Wouldn't Do Awful Things to Rats" (First published in New Dimensions 6 edited by Robert Silverberg.)
- "She Waits for All Men Born" (First published in Future Power edited by Jack Dann and Gardner Dozois.)

== Reception ==
A Publishers Weekly review comments on the fact that Tiptree has only just now been revealed to be a woman, as well as stating "Much of the best of Tiptree's work has appeared in previous collections, and these seven stories, though never less than intelligent and perceptive, don't have many blockbusters among them."

"Houston, Houston, Do You Read?" was the recipient of several awards: the Hugo Award, Nebula Award and Jupiter Award for Best Novella in 1977, as well as third place in the 1977 Locus Poll Award for Best Novella.
