= Up the Walls of the World =

1978 science fiction novel by James Tiptree Jr.

- Cover of the first edition
- Author: James Tiptree, Jr.
- Cover artist: Don Brautigam
- Language: English
- Genre: Science fiction
- Publisher: Berkley Books
- Publication date: February 1978
- Publication place: United States
- Media type: Print (hardback and paperback)
- Pages: 319
- ISBN: 0-399-12083-1
- OCLC: 3167162
- Dewey Decimal: 813/.5/4
- LC Class: PZ4.T597 Up PS3570.I66

Up the Walls of the World is a 1978 science fiction novel by American author Alice Sheldon, who wrote under the pen name of James Tiptree, Jr. It was the first novel she published, having until then worked and built a reputation only in the field of short stories.

The novel explores the possibility that telepathy and other psychic phenomena are real. It describes an attempt to invade Earth by beings with advanced telepathic abilities from the planet Tyree.

The book considers the subject of sentience in different life forms inhabiting widely different environments; in computers; and in a vast sentient inhabitant of deep space formed of a network of widely spaced nodes.

The story takes place in three settings which unfold together:

- On Earth, at a telepathy lab run by the US Navy.
- On the planet Tyree, a life-rich gas giant inhabited by intelligent beings resembling manta rays or cuttlefish which ride the air currents of its vast atmosphere.
- In deep space, the Destroyer, an intelligent entity larger than a solar system but only slightly denser than the vacuum of space and composed of countless linked nodes.

== Reception ==
At Syfy.com, A. M. Dellamonica praised the story's "upbeat tone (and) lack of cynicism", with "rock-solid characterization", "a pleasingly chewy ethical complexity", an "indisputably rich" setting, and the "bright optimism of Golden Age SF", with the Tyree being "one of SF's most convincing alien races." In the Guardian, Gwyneth Jones likewise commended the Tyree as "the most convincing non-humanoid aliens I've ever met" and overall found the novel to be "joyous and positively starry-eyed SF, with great characters".

James Nicoll considered it "atypical" and "oddly un-Tiptreeian", noting his own "increasing amazement" that, despite the characters being "people doing terrible things for what seem to them sufficient reasons", they nonetheless "manage to fumble towards (...) a happy ending;" ultimately, he emphasized, although he felt that the book "suffers in comparison to Tiptree's short [stories]", it is nonetheless a "competent novel".

Writing in the SF Encyclopedia, John Clute called it a "tour de force" and an "extraordinarily full-blown space opera" whose various plot threads "interpenetrate complexly and with considerable narrative impact" but observed that the novel was "apparently written around the time [Tiptree's] health began to break", such that "stresses – particularly a sense that the whole structure was willed into existence – do show".

In Reactor, Bogi Takács analyzed the novel's approach to gender, noting that it is "filled to the brim with gender- and sexuality-related topics, in non-straightforward ways that in many respects make it fascinating even today... and in some others, have aged the text quite painfully." Takács particularly commended Tiptree for addressing the interaction between gender identity and body swaps "much more sensitively and insightfully than many present-day authors" but could not "unambiguously endorse" the novel, due to its portrayal of racial issues: the character of Margaret Omali is a black woman who was subjected to female genital mutilation during a trip to Kenya when she was 13, which "is portrayed crudely, becomes the explanation and focus for her entire personality, and also turns upside down all the aspects of Margaret's character that could have been considered subversive".
