= A Momentary Taste of Being =

1975 novella by James Tiptree, Jr.

- Short story by James Tiptree, Jr.
- Language: English
- Genre: science fiction

Publication
- Published in: The New Atlantis and Other Novellas of Science Fiction
- Publisher: Hawthorn Books
- Publication date: 1975
- Publication place: United States
- Media type: Anthology

"A Momentary Taste of Being" is a science fiction novella written by Alice Bradley Sheldon, published under the pseudonym James Tiptree, Jr. in the 1975 anthology The New Atlantis and Other Novellas of Science Fiction (also featuring stories by Gene Wolfe and Ursula K. Le Guin).

== Plot ==
In a world where the excessive human population necessitates an interstellar search for a habitable planet, Aaron Kaye is the resident psychiatrist of Centaur, the second relativistic starship sent by the United Nations for this endeavor. The ship's crew has discovered a planet potentially capable of supporting human life, and after sending an away team to investigate the planet, only one crew member returns—Lory Kaye, Dr. Kaye's sister.

The story primarily concerns what occurred on the planet and why Lory was the only returning member. Lory insists that the planet is a paradise, and that the samples she retrieved are harmless, but she and others who came into contact with the samples are held in quarantine regardless.

Tensions among the multinational crew grow as the leaders of the expedition try to decide if they should send a message back to Earth telling them to come to the planet or not.

== Title ==
The title is taken from Edward Fitzgerald's translation of The Rubaiyat of Omar Khayyam, quatrain XL:

A Moment's Halt -- a momentary taste
Of Being from the Well amid the Waste --
And Lo! the phantom Caravan has reach'd
The Nothing it set out from -- Oh, make haste!

== Publication history ==
In addition to its inclusion in the various printings of The New Atlantis and Other Novellas of Science Fiction, the story also appeared in Star Songs of an Old Primate (first published 1978) and Her Smoke Rose Up Forever (first published 1990), both of which are collections of Tiptree's short fiction.

== Reception ==
"A Momentary Taste of Being" was nominated for the Nebula Award for Best Novella in 1976, and received 7th place in the 1976 Locus Poll for Best Novella.
