= Tales of the Quintana Roo =

1986 collection of fantasy stories by Alice Sheldon

- Dust-jacket illustration by Glennray Tutor for Tales of the Quintana Roo
- Author: James Tiptree Jr.
- Illustrator: Glennray Tutor
- Cover artist: Glennray Tutor
- Language: English
- Genre: Fantasy
- Publisher: Arkham House
- Publication date: 1986
- Publication place: United States
- Media type: Print (hardback)
- Pages: x, 101
- ISBN: 0-87054-152-8
- OCLC: 12372417
- Dewey Decimal: 813/.54 19
- LC Class: PS3570.I66 T3 1986

Tales of the Quintana Roo is a collection of fantasy stories by American author Alice Sheldon, writing as James Tiptree Jr. It was released in 1986 and was the author's first book published by Arkham House. It was published in an edition of 3,673 copies. The stories originally appeared in Isaac Asimov's Science Fiction Magazine and The Magazine of Fantasy & Science Fiction and are set in the easternmost shore of the Yucatán Peninsula in Mexico. In addition to winning the world fantasy award for best collection in 1987, each of the stories was nominated or won genre awards, and "What Came Ashore at Lirios" was included in the Oxford Book of Fantasy Stories.

== Contents ==
Tales of the Quintana Roo contains the following stories:

1. "A Note About the Mayas of the Quintana Roo"
2. "What Came Ashore at Lirios" (published in Isaac Asimov's Science Fiction Magazine as "Lirios: A Tale of the Quintana Roo")
3. "The Boy Who Waterskied to Forever"
4. "Beyond the Dead Reef"

== Awards ==
The collection and the stories contained therein were nominated for a number of genre awards:

- Tales of Quintana Roo (Winner of the World Fantasy Award for best collection, 1987)
- "What Came Ashore at Lirios" (Nominated for a Nebula Award, 1981)
- "The Boy Who Waterskied to Forever" (Nominated for a Hugo Award, 1982)
- "Beyond the Dead Reef" (Winner of a Locus Award for best short story, 1983)

== Sources ==
- Chalker, Jack L.; Mark Owings (1998). The Science-Fantasy Publishers: A Bibliographic History, 1923-1998. Westminster and Baltimore: Mirage Press, Ltd.
- Jaffery, Sheldon (1989). The Arkham House Companion. Mercer Island, WA: Starmont House, Inc. ISBN 1-55742-005-X.
- Joshi, S. T. (1999). Sixty Years of Arkham House: A History and Bibliography. Sauk City: Arkham House. ISBN 0-87054-176-5.
- Nielsen, Leon (2004). Arkham House Books: A Collector's Guide. Jefferson, NC and London: McFarland & Company, Inc. ISBN 0-7864-1785-4.
