= Dave Archer (painter) =

American painter

- Born: January 15, 1941; San Luis Obispo, California, U.S.
- Died: August 15, 2023 (aged 82); Roseburg, OR, U.S.
- Occupations: Painter, sculptor

Dave Archer (born David Archer Nelson on January 15, 1941) is an American reverse glass painter and sculptor.

== Early life ==
Dave Archer Nelson was born on January 15, 1941, in San Luis Obispo, California. In an interview, Archer said he knew he wanted to be an artist ever since competing in a high school art competition at the age of 14 Archer graduated high school with a scholarship to study art with founding member of the California Watercolor School, Phil Paradise

In the ’60’s, working under the name, David Nelson, the artist lived and painted in San Francisco's bohemian underground art scene in the North Beach, San Francisco, during the Beat Generation. Archer’s Sixties included supporting his art by working as doorman of a folk era coffeehouse, which among others, featured entertainers Janis Joplin, Hoyt Axton, and Steve Martin at the very beginning of their professional careers.

== Career ==
In the 1970s, Archer was introduced to glass painting by artist Ron Russell. Their mutual friend Lee Byrd had been experimenting for years with electricity and built his own Tesla coil. Eventually, it occurred to Archer and Russell to combine Byrd’s electrical experiments with their glass paintings. After much trial and error, the trio were able develop an art process quite similar to what Archer uses in his art today.

In 1999, Archer moved to Roseburg, Oregon, from California to look after his mother, who would pass away in 2001.

In his 2002 memoirs, Archer recalls his experiences living and working in North Beach, San Francisco in various capacities, and of the characters he met there in the 1960s. Some were famous and many others, such as Hoyt Axton, Janis Joplin and Steve Martin (who got their starts in San Francisco at the Fox and Hound - later called Coffee and Confusion - where Archer worked) were up-and-coming and later became famous.

In 2009, he took on local resident Brent Durand as his apprentice. Together they have performed million volt demonstrations at the “Elements” Gallery in Cannon Beach, Oregon and produced many paintings together.

== Artwork ==
Archer's primary medium is reverse glass painting, which he pioneered with artist Ron Russell and Lee Byrd. The technique consists of applying paint or pigment to the underside of a glass plate then applying a million volts of electricity generated from a Tesla coil to disperse the paint into randomly generated patterns. This gives the painting a space like quality.

Since the 70's, the artist's painting machines were designed and built by the late, Bill Wysock, noted master Tesla-coil engineer, builder and producer of special lightning effects for countless Hollywood movies. Archer's coils are specifically designed for his painting needs.

Recently, Archer has begun sculpting using found object armatures, which he then covers with an activated resin substance, using various tools to make impressions which he refers to as “markings”, then adding pigments of various colors to highlight the impressions.

== Fame ==
Dave Archer's paintings have been featured on Star Trek, decorating the Enterprise set on the television series Star Trek: The Next Generation, received screen credit in the movie Star Trek VI: The Undiscovered Country, and was included in Star Trek Generations.

He has demonstrated the reverse-glass painting technique on over two hundred television series, including, "Eye to Eye With Connie Chung", "Beyond 2000", and Discovery Channel's "The Next Step" and "World's of Wonder".

Archer's paintings have been on numerous book jackets including: Fantasy and Earth by Isaac Asimov; N-Space and Playgrounds of the Mind by Larry Niven; Music Physician by Don Campbell; The Oxygen Barons by Gregory Feeley; The Starry Rift and the Crown of Stars by James Tiptree, Jr.; Alastor and Planet of Adventure by Jack Vance as well as the Vance Anthology of City of the Chasch / Servants of the Wankh / The Dirdir / The Pnume

In the print media, Archer's work was featured in Omni and National Geographic Magazine. He has also appeared in Ripley’s Believe It or Not! Sunday newspaper comic.

== Shows ==
Archer's work has been shown in the world headquarters of AT&T on Madison Avenue in New York City, and the Hayden Planetarium in Central Park in New York.

== Books ==
- Archer's first book, Survival Art, Painting and Sculpting for Food, Clothing and Shelter, was published by Coyotel Press in 2009.
- In 2009, Coyotel Press also published his collaboration with Steve Hapy, Will Taylor, and Steven Johnson Leyba titled The Trickster’s Bible: A Never Ending Book.

== Chronology ==
- 1941: ARCHER, DAVE, painter and sculptor, born David Archer Nelson, in San Luis Obispo, January, 1941
- 1961: Elysian Art Gallery, San Francisco, California
- 1965: Unicorn Gallery, San Francisco, California
- 1965: Joker's Flux Gallery, San Francisco, California
- 1967: City Lights Bookstore, San Francisco, California
- 1967: Running Elk Gallery, San Francisco, California
- 1973: De Poliolo Gallery, Palm Springs, California
- 1974: William Stone Gallery, San Francisco, California
- 1974: Robinson's Red Door Gallery, Morro Bay, California
- 1974: Erickson's Gallery, Tiburon, California
- 1975: M.H. de Young Museum, San Francisco, California
- 1977: Glass Art Gallery, San Rafael, California
- 1978: Amber Gallery, San Francisco, California
- 1979: Westheimer Art Festival, Houston, Texas
- 1979: Sausalito Art Festival, California
- 1980: Laguna Beach Art Festival, California
- 1980: The Boulevard - Las Vegas, Nevada
- 1980: Tapestry in Talent - San Jose, California
- 1981: Mill Valley Fall Arts Festival, California
- 1981: Omni Magazine Art Show, Marshall Fields' Dept. Store, Chicago
- 1982: MGM Grand Hotel, Reno, Nevada
- 1982: Sheraton Hotel - Steamboat Springs, Colorado
- 1982: "I Got Reemed In Reem" Art Show - Reem, California
- 1983: Kersting Gallery, Sausalito, California
- 1983–1988,1991-1995: Swanson Art Galleries, San Francisco, California
- 1987: Celebration of Innovation, San Francisco, California
- 1988: Planetarium, Brussels, Belgium
- 1989: Jacqueline Westbrook Gallery, La Jolla, California
- 1989: Dyansen Gallery, San Francisco, California
- 1989: Gallery San Francisco - San Francisco, California
- 1989: The Royal Art Gallery, Lahaina, Maui, Hawaii
- 1989: The Pendragon Gallery, Annapolis, Maryland
- 1989: Roy's Gallery, Lawrence, Kansas
- 1989: The Omniversum, The Hague, Netherlands - One Man Show - Permanent Collection
- 1989: Imagine Tokyo `89, Tokyo, Japan
- 1989: Gallery Alternative, San Jose, California
- 1989: Addi Gallery of Coronado, California
- 1990: Phoenix Gallery, Topeka, Kansas
- 1990: San Luis Obispo Art Center, San Luis Obispo, California - One Man Homecoming Show
- 1990: Just Looking Gallery, San Luis Obispo, California
- 1990: The AT&T World Headquarters, New York, New York - One Man Show - Permanent - Collection & Exhibit
- 1990: Dyansen Gallery, San Francisco, California
- 1990-1991: Dorog Gallery, Beverly Hills, California
- 1990-1991: Hayden Planetarium, Central Park, New York -One Man Show- Permanent Collection
- 1990: BENEFIT Show - Stop The Buck - With entertainment by Grace Slick and Friends – Novato, California
- 1991: Von Der Ahe Galleries, Ltd., Monterey, California
- 1991: Dyansen Gallery, San Francisco, California
- 1991: The Vault Gallery, Cambria, California
- 1991: Ship Store Gallery, Kauai, Hawaii
- 1991: Tower Gallery, Sacramento, California
- 1991: Angel City Gallery, Los Angeles, California
- 1991: Brandywine Fantasy Gallery, Chicago, Illinois
- 1991: BENEFIT Show - Fairfax - San Anselmo Children's Center – Novato, California
- 1991: Chi-Con - World Science Fiction Convention, Chicago, Illinois
- 1991: Museum of Science and Industry, Chicago, Illinois - Permanent Collection
- 1991: Whole Life Expo, San Jose, California
- 1992: Off The Wall Gallery - Huntington Beach, California
- 1992: Off The Wall Gallery - Newport Beach, California
- 1992: The Vault Gallery – Cambria, California
- 1992: Seldom Scene Gallery – Fairfax, California - With Stanley Mouse, Ralph McQuarrie and Mati Klarwein
- 1992: Metropolitan Art Gallery – Lahaina, Maui, Hawaii
- 1992: Hudson River Museum – Yonkers, New York
- 1993: The Infinite Line Of Piero Manzoni - Milan, Italy - Invitational
- 1993: BENEFIT Show – Fairfax, San Anselmo Children's Center – Novato, California
- 1993: 4th Annual Mythical Realism Exhibit - Brandywine Fantasy Gallery – Chicago, Illinois
- 1993: Weinstein Gallery - San Francisco, California
- 1993: Artisan's Gallery Group Invitational - Mill Valley, California
- 1993: Vault Gallery - Cambria, California
- 1995: The Seekers Collection & Gallery - Cambria, California
- 1995: The Glass Eye Gallery - Seattle, Washington - 1995
- 1995: Southern Wind - Kinetic / Op Art Gallery - New Orleans, Louisiana
- 1996: Shibuya Pantheon - Tokyo - Japan - Premier /Star Trek Generations
- 1996: Panasonic World Headquarters – Shinagawa, Japan
- 1996: Yountchi - Rieger Fine Art - San Francisco, California
- 1997: The Glass Eye Gallery - Seattle, Washington
- 1997: Danskin Galleries - Palm Desert, California
- 1997: Yountchi-Rieger Fine Art - San Francisco, California
- 1998: Gallery Harvest – Nagoya, Japan
- 1998: The Marceline Bonorden Gallery of Fine Art - New Orleans, Louisiana
- 1998-2001: Rieger Fine Art / Artist's Studio Show and Sale – Novato, California
- 1998-2003: Gallery Harvest - Nogoya - Japan - November - 1998
- 2002: Art Encounter - Las Vegas - Nevada - 2002
- 2003: Danville Fine Arts Gallery - "Technology Creates" – Danville, California
- 2023: Died in Roseburg, OR
