= The Women Men Don't See =

- Short story by James Tiptree, Jr.
- Country: United States
- Language: English
- Genre(s): Feminist science fiction

Publication
- Published in: The Magazine of Fantasy and Science Fiction volume 45, number 6
- Publication type: Periodical
- Publisher: Mercury Press, Inc.
- Media type: Print
- Publication date: December 1973

"The Women Men Don't See" is a science fiction novelette by American writer Alice Bradley Sheldon, published under the pseudonym James Tiptree, Jr.

Originally published in Fantasy and Science Fiction in 1973, it subsequently was republished in the magazine's October 1979 thirtieth anniversary issue, and again in 2009's The Very Best of Fantasy & Science Fiction: Sixtieth Anniversary Anthology.

== Plot ==
The short story is told from the perspective of Don Fenton, an American government agent, and revolves around Ruth Parsons, a woman he meets while on vacation in Mexico. Ruth and her daughter Althea charter a plane with the Maya pilot Esteban and allow Fenton to travel with them. When the plane crashes in a mangrove swamp on the coast of Quintana Roo, Don and Ruth split off from Althea and Esteban in order to search for fresh water. Throughout the ordeal, Don becomes increasingly annoyed when Ruth does not panic or act in a way he expects of a woman. His conversations with Ruth reveal that she feels alienated since she is a woman, though Don is unable to understand her views. She tells him, "What women do is survive. We live by ones and twos in the chinks of your world-machine." During an encounter with aliens, Ruth pleads with them to take her and Althea away from Earth while Don tries to "save" her from the extraterrestrials. In the end the aliens leave with the Parsons, leaving Don bewildered and questioning why the two women would rather leave with aliens than stay on Earth.

Tiptree's own synopsis of the story concludes "Message is total misunderstanding of women's motivations by narrator, who relates everything to self," and who can only see women sexually: the women are practically invisible to him, except when he thinks of them as potential erotic interests. In his mind, Ruth is only a possibility for seduction, as Althea is only a potential seduction for Esteban, even in the midst of a survival emergency.

== Writing ==
Alice Sheldon commented that she knew the character of Ruth Parsons so well, all she had to do was "keep her from talking too much. But Don Fenton—!" She had difficulty communicating indirectly a woman's anger by writing in a man's detached, uncomprehending voice. However, Julie Phillips writes, "If it did Alli [Sheldon] psychic damage to be Don Fenton as well as Ruth Parsons, 'The Women Men Don't See' is about that psychic damage."

== Reception ==
Robert Silverberg reviewed the story before it became known that Tiptree's works were written by a woman. He compared Tiptree favorably with Ernest Hemingway and remarked that "it is a profoundly feminist story told in an entirely masculine manner, and deserves close attention by those in the front lines in the wars of sexual liberation, male and female." After he learned the truth, he told Sheldon "You've given my head a great needed wrenching."

When "The Women Men Don't See" reached the Nebula Award finals, Tiptree withdrew it from the ballot while offering a vague excuse about giving other writers a chance. According to Julie Phillips, Tiptree did not want the male byline to give the story an unfair advantage. While writing an extensive correspondence, Tiptree urged male correspondents to take feminism seriously. Gardner Dozois said that "The Women Men Don't See" should have won the Hugo Award for Best Novelette, though it did not even make it onto the ballot. Tiptree did win the Best Novella Hugo that year (for "The Girl Who Was Plugged In"), and was nominated but did not win Best Novelette Hugo (for "Love Is the Plan the Plan Is Death"). "The Women Men Don't See" was also nominated for the 1974 Locus Award for Best Short Story.

PZ Myers describes the narrator of "The Women Men Don't See" as not just unreliable, but "irrelevant"—"a man who comes along for the ride and really doesn't understand anything that's going on, because he can't see the real protagonists as anything but a couple of women."
