= Huntington D. Sheldon =

U.S. intelligence officer

Huntington Denton "Ting" Sheldon
- Born: February 14, 1903; Greenwich, Connecticut, U.S.
- Died: May 19, 1987 (aged 84); McLean, Virginia, U.S.
- Education: Eton College; Yale University
- Occupations: Wall Street Banker; US Military Aviator; US Intelligence Official
- Spouses: Magda Merck (1928–1936); Frederica Frelinghuysen (1938–1941?); Alice B. Sheldon (1945–1987)
- Children: 3

Huntington Denton "Ting" Sheldon (February 14, 1903 – May 19, 1987) was an American who served as the director of the Office of Current Intelligence of the US Central Intelligence Agency from 1951 to 1961, serving under presidents Truman, Eisenhower, and Kennedy. Sheldon was the second director of the OCI, and developed it into a major Office. Sheldon briefed all three presidents; the President's Intelligence Check List, which became the President's Daily Brief, was developed by Richard Lehman under his direction.

== Personal life ==
His first wife was Magda Merck, youngest daughter of George Merck, the founder of Merck & Co. They were married on April 12, 1928, and had three children, Huntington, Audrey, and Peter. The marriage ended in divorce in November 1936. He was later the husband of science-fiction writer Alice B. Sheldon (alias James Tiptree Jr.), 12 years his junior. In 1987, she shot and killed Sheldon and then herself in what was either a murder-suicide or, based on her personal writings, a suicide pact.

== Education ==
As an undergraduate, he earned a bachelor's degree from Yale University and was a member of Scroll and Key.
