= Steven Johnson Leyba =

Steven Johnson Leyba is an American artist and musician whose work has used swastikas..

In 1997, in his “Apache Whiskey Rite” before an audience of the San Francisco political establishment, he was sodomized by a woman wearing a bottle of Jack Daniels whiskey in a harness. The performance resulted in national media attention. including the front page of The New York Times,
