= Brittany Nelson =

American artist (born 1984)

- Education: Montana State University; Cranbrook Academy of Art
- Notable work: Mordançage
- Style: camera-less photography
- Awards: 2015 Creative Capital Grant in Visual Arts
- Website: brittanynelson.com

Brittany Nelson is an American artist. She works in the medium of camera-less photography.

== Career ==
Nelson was born in 1984 in Great Falls, Montana. She got her Bachelor of Arts in Photography from Montana State University in 2007, and her MFA in Photography from Cranbrook Academy of Art in 2011.

Nelson is an Assistant Professor of Photography at the University of Richmond since 2017. She has lectured at the Rhode Island School of Design, Parsons The New School, Cranbrook Academy of Art, SUNY New Paltz, and the Minneapolis College of Art and Design.

Nelson is the recipient of a 2015 Creative Capital Grant in Visual Arts. She is represented by Patron Gallery in Chicago. She has exhibited at the Museum of Contemporary Art Detroit, Bonniers Konsthall Stockholm, and the Brooklyn Academy of Music, among others.

== Personal life ==
Nelson lives in Richmond, Virginia.

== Reviews ==
In 2016, the New Yorker referred to Nelson's Mordançage series as "Oozing out of their frames, viscous and glittering, the largest works in Nelson’s show suggest hot lava or tar. But the roiling abstractions are actually cameraless photographs. Ranging in size from three to six feet square, they balance earthy physicality with otherworldliness—we could be looking at views of the earth’s core or outer space."

In reference to the same series of work, Taylor Glascock of Wired wrote: "Instead of making pictures with a camera, she creates fascinating textures and patterns using black and white photo paper and chemicals in an obscure process that's just a bit dangerous."

Regarding queer desires, politics, and science fiction, particularly by Alice B. Sheldon alias James Tiptree Jr., in Nelson's work, Lauren Deland of frieze wrote in 2019: "Nelson succeeds admirably in conveying the urgency of these yearnings without romanticizing the desperate sense of nonbelonging that often spurs them." Jeremy Lybarger of Art in America called her series of large-scale bromoil prints depicting landscapes of Mars taken by the Opportunity rover "an affective combination, one that echoes the juxtaposition of technology and human intervention."

Collector Daily highlighted Nelson's Tintype series as "muted, ghostly images [that] shift and turn in sequence, like they are emerging from fog, their object quality and physical presence becoming important parts of how we address them." The magazine lauded her revision of photo-historical processes because "Nelson’s works feel freshly contemporary – her dissections of these processes extend them to riskier locales, where their strengths can be applied to new visual problems."

When asked about her revisiting of traditional photographic techniques in an interview in Aesthetica, Nelson highlighted the value of what are commonly considered anomalies in the chemistry for her practice: "I, in turn, go to great lengths to create these failures."

== Major works ==
- Mordançage (2010–present)
- Tintype series (2016–present)
