= Ten Thousand Light-Years from Home =

Short story collection by James Tiptree Jr.

- First edition
- Author: James Tiptree, Jr.
- Cover artist: Chris Foss
- Language: English
- Genre: Science fiction
- Publisher: Ace Books
- Publication date: July 1973
- Publication place: United States
- Media type: Print (Paperback, Hardcover)
- Pages: 319 pp
- OCLC: 50687237

Ten Thousand Light-Years from Home is a short story collection by Alice Sheldon under the pen name of James Tiptree Jr. that was first published in 1973. This was the first book Sheldon published.

== Contents ==
- Introduction by Harry Harrison
- "And I Awoke and Found Me Here on the Cold Hill's Side"
- "The Snows Are Melted, The Snows Are Gone"
- "The Peacefulness of Vivyan"
- "Mamma Come Home" (a.k.a. "The Mother Ship")
- "Help" (a.k.a. "Pupa Knows Best")
- "Painwise"
- "Faithful to Thee, Terra, in Our Fashion" (a.k.a. "Parimutuel Planet")
- "The Man Doors Said Hello To"
- "The Man Who Walked Home"
- "Forever to a Hudson Bay Blanket"
- "I'll Be Waiting for You When the Swimming Pool Is Empty"
- "I'm Too Big But I Love to Play"
- "Birth of a Salesman"
- "Mother in the Sky with Diamonds"
- "Beam Us Home"
