= Out of the Everywhere and Other Extraordinary Visions =

1981 short story collection by Alice Sheldon

Out of the Everywhere, and Other Extraordinary Visions
- First edition
- Author: Alice Sheldon (as James Tiptree, Jr)
- Cover artist: Rick Sternbach
- Language: English
- Genre: Science fiction
- Publisher: Del Rey Books
- Publication date: December 1981
- Publication place: United States
- Media type: Print (paperback)
- Pages: 276
- ISBN: 0-345-28485-2
- OCLC: 8043640

Out of the Everywhere, and Other Extraordinary Visions is a short story collection by American writer James Tiptree, Jr, first published in 1981 as a Del Rey Books paperback original. All but two of the stories had been previously published, four of them under the pseudonym Raccoona Sheldon (as opposed to Tiptree, also a pseudonym).

== Contents ==
- "Angel Fix" (1974, as Sheldon)
- "Beaver Tears" (1976, as Sheldon)
- "Your Faces, O My Sisters! Your Faces Filled of Light!" (1976, as Sheldon)
- "The Screwfly Solution" (winner of the Nebula Award for novelette in 1978) (1977, as Sheldon)
- "Time-Sharing Angel" (1977)
- "We Who Stole the Dream" (1978)
- "Slow Music" (1980)
- "A Source of Innocent Merriment" (1980)
- Out of the Everywhere (1981, winner of the Seiun Award for overseas short fiction in 2000)
- With Delicate Mad Hands (1981, winner of the Hayakawa Award for foreign short story in 1993)

== See also ==
- Out of the Everywhere - Collection of science essays by Isaac Asimov.
