= Love Is the Plan the Plan Is Death =

1973 short story by Alice Bradley Sheldon

- Short story by James Tiptree, Jr.
- Language: English
- Genre: Science fiction

Publication
- Published in: The Alien Condition
- Publication type: Anthology
- Publisher: Ballantine Books
- Media type: Print
- Publication date: April 1973

"Love Is the Plan the Plan Is Death" is a science fiction short story by James Tiptree, Jr., a pen name used by American writer Alice Sheldon. It won a Nebula Award for Best Short Story in 1974. It first appeared in the anthology The Alien Condition, edited by Stephen Goldin, published by Ballantine Books in April 1973.

== Plot ==
The story is told in the first person by Moggadeet, a self-aware male of a species which appears to be the apex predator of its environment. This possibly arthropod species is apparently cold-blooded, with various features that come into play in battle, nurturing the young (for females), and sex. Unusually, Moggadeet's mother and an older male have supplemented his instincts by making him aware of the Plan, i.e., the normal life-cycle of his species. The element of this Plan he most resists is the cannibalism of other members of his own species.

Moggadeet narrates his life from the moment he meets his mate in the spring of his second year, including his memories of his first year. After a while he remembers what his mate said at various points, expressing fears and concerns. By the end it becomes clear that Moggadeet is telling this story to his mate while she is eating him; he assumes she agrees with his recollections.

== Collections ==
"Love is the Plan the Plan is Death" has appeared in the following collections:

- The Alien Condition edited by Stephen Goldin (1973)
- Nebula Award Stories 9 edited by Kate Wilhelm (1974)
- Warm Worlds and Otherwise by James Tiptree Jr. (1975)
- The Future I edited by Joseph D. Olander, Martin H. Greenberg, and Isaac Asimov (1981)
- Great Science Fiction: Stories by the World's Great Scientists edited by Isaac Asimov, Martin H. Greenberg, and Charles G. Waugh (1985)
- Byte Beautiful: Eight Science Fiction Stories by James Tiptree Jr. (1985)
- The Science Fiction Hall of Fame, Volume IV edited by Terry Carr (1986)
- The Best of the Nebulas edited by Ben Bova (1989)
- Her Smoke Rose Up Forever by James Tiptree Jr. (1990)

== Reception ==
"Love is the Plan the Plan Is Death" won the 1974 Nebula Award for Best Short Story and was nominated for the Hugo Award for Best Novelette, and was ranked 3rd in the Locus Magazine poll for Best Short Fiction.

Kirkus Reviews called it "highly lauded." The Washington Post considered that the "image (of) an intelligent species whose biological imperatives compel females to devour their mates (...) is dramatized with the directness of an arrow striking a bullseye".
