= Julie Phillips =

American writer

Julie Phillips (born Seattle, Washington) is an American writer who writes about books, film, and culture. In early adulthood she became interested in feminism. Her articles have appeared in Newsday, Mademoiselle, The Village Voice, and elsewhere. Her biography of James Tiptree, Jr., titled James Tiptree, Jr.: The Double Life of Alice B. Sheldon, won the National Book Critics Circle Award, the Hugo Award for Best Related Book, the 2007 Washington State Book Award for History/Biography, and the Locus Award for Best Non-fiction/Art Book.

In 2017, she was awarded a Whiting Creative Nonfiction grant to complete her book The Baby on the Fire Escape: Creativity, Motherhood, and the Mind-Baby Problem, which was published in 2022. She is at present working on a biography of the writer Ursula K. Le Guin.

She lives with her husband and two children in Amsterdam, where she is a book critic for the daily newspaper Trouw and for the website 4Columns.
