= The Screwfly Solution =

- Short story by James Tiptree Jr.
- Country: United States
- Language: English
- Genres: Science fiction, horror

Publication
- Published in: Analog Science Fiction/Science Fact
- Publication type: Anthology
- Publisher: Condé Nast
- Media type: Print (Magazine)
- Publication date: June 1977

"The Screwfly Solution" is a 1977 science fiction novella by Raccoona Sheldon, a pen name for American psychologist Alice Sheldon, who also wrote as James Tiptree Jr. The story is about a misogynistic cult.

When the story was first published in June 1977, the identity of Alice Sheldon as both Tiptree and Raccoona Sheldon was unknown to the public or anyone in the science fiction community; the identity behind the pen-names was revealed by the end of the same year.

"The Screwfly Solution" received the Nebula Award for Best Novelette in 1978, and has been adapted into a television film. It is included in Tiptree's anthology Out of the Everywhere and Other Extraordinary Visions.

The title refers to the sterile insect technique, a technique of eradicating the population of screwflies by the release of large amounts of sterilized males that would compete with fertile males, thus reducing the native population more with each generation this is done. This story concerns a similar distortion of human sexuality with disastrous results.

== Plot summary ==
The story begins with an exchange of letters and news clippings between Alan, a scientist working on parasite eradication by releasing sterile insects in Colombia, and his wife, Anne Alstein, at home in the U.S., concerning an epidemic of organized murder of women by men.

The murderers feel that their killings are driven by natural instincts and have constructed elaborate, misogynistic rationalizations for their acts. For example, a new religious movement, the Sons of Adam, is spreading along with the murders. The Sons of Adam believe that women are evil, that the Garden of Eden was a paradise before women were created, that God is telling them to get rid of all of the women, and that once women are eliminated, God will either make everyone live forever or reveal a better way to reproduce (the movement is unclear about what exactly would happen). When the religion initially arises, prior to the organized murders, little is done to stop the ideology's spread, nor is the movement's actions of evicting women from the areas the men control prevented.

Initially, some women fight back, such as three women who steal an Air Force plane and bomb Dallas, but organized resistance fails to materialize. There is extensive censoring of the news, as the government believes that it is a case of mass psychological hysteria that can be snuffed out by suppressing the news. However, a minority of scientists figure out the truth: Some kind of infectious agent is spreading in the atmosphere, turning human male sexual impulses into violent ones.

Alan, a sensitive, kindly man, realizes that he is succumbing to the infection and tries to resist the impulses and isolate himself from women. While he does this, his wife and teenage daughter argue: the daughter, faithful to her father, refuses to believe her mother's warnings about him. She sneaks off to visit her father, and he murders her, then kills himself in horror over his actions.

Anne flees north, to Canada, since the disease had begun in the tropical zones and is spreading toward temperate zones. In the end, Anne, pursued by an entire society bent on femicide, discovers the source and motivation behind the plague: an alien species is intentionally causing the human race to destroy itself so that the aliens can have Earth for themselves.

== Themes ==
"The Screwfly Solution" explores the link between sex and death. Sarah LeFanu wrote that Tiptree associates the male sexual drive with violence. Veronica Hollinger wrote that "The Screwfly Solution" demonstrates "Tiptree's determination to follow the implications of gender difference to their grimly logical conclusions".

Lewis Call points out that the story establishes the link between sex and violence as a characteristic of the species, not of a single sex. Call also draws attention to the fact the women and girls were not the only victims in the story; young boys and other men were also killed. He concludes: "But heterosexuality is not the problem in 'Screwfly'. The problem is power; more specifically, it is the basic, fundamental connection between violence and the erotic that is to be found in every sexual relationship, whether the relationship in question is heterosexual, homosexual, or transhuman." Call speculates that proposing the idea that sex and violence are linked for everyone had to be written by Raccoona because it would not have been accepted coming from the male persona of Tiptree.

Analyzing Tiptree's writings in the context of postcolonialism versus sociobiology, David Galef compares the aliens' interference with human biological drives in "The Screwfly Solution" to the Army giving Indians blankets that had been exposed to smallpox.

== Background ==
Sheldon wrote "The Screwfly Solution" over the period of a week, shortly after her mother's death. She chose the epistolary approach, couching the story in the form of "reports, interviews, diary entries, and letters". She submitted it to Analog Science Fiction and Fact in November, 1976. Sheldon considered "The Screwfly Solution" to be one of her "really feminist tales".

== Other media ==
"The Screwfly Solution" was adapted into a television film by screenwriter Sam Hamm and director Joe Dante for the Showtime network's Masters of Horror series, premiering December 8, 2006. A reviewer in The Irish Journal of Gothic and Horror Studies considered it one of the "gems" of the series.

In 1998, director Jeff Meyers adapted "The Screwfly Solution" to a stageplay that was performed at the Firehouse Theatre in Portland, Oregon.

== See also ==
- Lordosis behavior
