= Aurora: Beyond Equality =

1976 anthology of feminist science fiction

- First edition
- Editors: Vonda N. McIntyre and Susan Janice Anderson
- Cover artist: Ann Dalton
- Genre: Science fiction
- Published: May 1976
- Publisher: Fawcett Gold Medal
- Media type: Anthology
- OCLC: 633283420

Aurora: Beyond Equality is an anthology of feminist science fiction edited by Vonda N. McIntyre and Susan Janice Anderson and published in 1976.

== Background and conception ==
Vonda N. McIntyre and Susan Janice Anderson began work on Aurora: Beyond Equality in 1974. The anthology followed other collections, such as the 1975 volume Women of Wonder edited by Pamela Sargent, that sought to explore gender in science fiction and the variation in writing style between male and female authors. McIntyre's "Of Mist, and Grass, and Sand" was among the pieces published in Women of Wonder. For Aurora: Beyond Equality, McIntyre and Anderson asked contributors for stories that, in their words, "would explore the future of human potential after equality between the sexes had been achieved". The editors disliked many of the stories they received, and the collection needed a year to be put together. It was eventually published in May 1976 by Fawcett Gold Medal.

== Contents ==
Aurora: Beyond Equality contained eight stories by seven authors, along with an essay by Ursula K. Le Guin. Le Guin's essay, titled "Is Gender Necessary", was a defense of the society of androgynous individuals she depicted in The Left Hand of Darkness, and her choice to use male pronouns for all of them. McIntyre and Anderson were under the impression that they had selected stories from four men and four women; in fact, two of the stories had come from the same author, Alice Sheldon, writing under two different pseudonyms (James Tiptree Jr. and Raccoona Sheldon). The other women authors were Mildred Downey Broxon, Joanna Russ, and Marge Piercy, while the male authors were David J. Skal, P. J. Plauger and Craig Strete.

- "Your Faces, O My Sisters! Your Faces Filled of Light!" by James Tiptree, Jr. (credited as Raccoona Sheldon)
- "Houston, Houston, Do You Read?" by James Tiptree, Jr.
- "The Mothers, the Mothers, How Eerily It Sounds" by David J. Skal
- "The Antrim Hills" by Mildred Downey Broxon
- "Is Gender Necessary?", an essay by Ursula K. Le Guin
- "Corruption" by Joanna Russ
- "Here Be Dragons" by P. J. Plauger
- "Why Has the Virgin Mary Never Entered the Wigwam of Standing Bear?" by Craig Strete
- "Woman on the Edge of Time" by Marge Piercy

== Reception and analysis ==
Science fiction scholar Mike Ashley stated that most of the stories in the collection failed in their attempt to portray a humanistic society, instead depicting "how hopeless men were and how superior women could be". According to Ashley, Piercy's "Woman on the Edge of Time", an excerpt from a novel of the same name published later that year, was the only piece depicting a non-sexist future. Tiptree's Houston, Houston, Do You Read? won the Nebula and Jupiter awards for best novella in 1976, and the Hugo Award for Best Novella in 1977, though it was criticized by some reviewers, including Marion Zimmer Bradley. Plauger's story "Here Be Dragons" entirely avoided using a pronoun for one of the characters, thereby leaving their gender ambiguous. The technique, later also used by McIntyre in her novel Dreamsnake, is described as delivering a feminist lesson, that an individual's capabilities and character were of greater importance than their gender.
