= The Girl Who Was Plugged In =

- Short story by James Tiptree, Jr.
- Language: English
- Genre: Science fiction

Publication
- Published in: New Dimensions 3
- Publication type: Anthology
- Publisher: Doubleday
- Publication date: October 1973
- Publication place: United States
- Media type: Print (Hardcover and Paperback)

"The Girl Who Was Plugged In" is a science fiction novella by American writer James Tiptree, Jr. It won the Hugo Award for Best Novella in 1974.

== Plot summary ==
The story takes place in a dystopian future where the world is controlled by a capitalist regime. Despite advertising being illegal ("ad" is, in fact, a dirty word), corporations are still able to persuade and control consumers by the celebrities they create for product placement. The protagonist, seventeen-year-old Philadelphia Burke, or P. Burke, is enlisted to become one of these celebrities after a suicide attempt fueled by society ostracizing her due to her Pituitary Dystrophy, better known as Cushing's Disease. While recovering in the hospital, she is chosen by a scout to become a "Remote Operator" for the beautiful corporate creation, known as Delphi, who was grown without a functioning brain from a modified embryo in an artificial womb. Though Delphi appears to be a normal fifteen-year-old-girl, she is controlled through a satellite linked to P. Burke's brain, which is still physically located in her original body.

=== The Remote and the Operator ===
The purpose of a remote and a remote operator, such as Delphi and P. Burke, is to remove the fear a company might have that a normal celebrity could act of their own accord. P. Burke controls Delphi, making her say and do whatever the company tells her to. That being said, after months of training, Delphi is strategically placed in a minor documentary film, and she becomes a media sensation overnight. Her job is to act as a celebrity traveling all over the world, all the while subtly buying and promoting products to influence the public in favor of a company.

=== A Harsh Reality ===
P. Burke not only falls in love with the life style, but Delphi as well. Acting as a perfect teenage girl, P. Burke has everything she has ever wanted. She has fame, respect, wealth, power, and eventually love. Paul Isham, the rich and rebellious son of a network executive, notices Delphi on the set of her Soap Opera and falls in love with her. P. Burke - and, by default, Delphi - reciprocates his feelings, but cannot let him know the truth. He eventually discovers and misunderstands the situation, believing Delphi is a normal girl who is enslaved by implants. He breaks into the lab where P. Burke is and is shocked to see Delphi being controlled by an unattractive, bedridden woman connected to countless machines. Out of rage and confusion, he rips the wires out of P. Burke, killing her. Delphi remains biologically "alive" and is put under the control of another operator.

== Analysis ==
The underlying discussions that take place in relation to "The Girl Who Was Plugged In" tend to focus on the female body and gender embodiment. In her article titled ""Whatever It Is that She's Since Become": Writing Bodies of Text and Bodies of Women in James Tiptree Jr.'s "The Girl Who Was Plugged In" and William Gibson's "Winter Market"", Heather J. Hicks puts focus on Tiptree's take on female embodiment in the form of P. Burke. Tiptree uses phrases like "pumped-out hulk", "girl brute" and "carcass" to devalue P. Burke, which further increases her feeling of uselessness in the story. This negative version of female embodiment is shown in contrast to the positive embodiment seen through Delphi, who is described as "flawless" and "beautiful". The juxtaposition of these two bodies allows for a discussion on the way different types of bodies function within the context of society presented throughout the story.

=== Different types of bodies ===
Two different types of bodies are presented throughout the story. Heather J. Hicks explains that Delphi is the body with value, while P. Burke is seen as the opposite. This obsession with perfection is seen through the use of celebrities, including Delphi, as advertisements. Her beauty gives her influence over the population, which in turn gives her opportunities that P. Burke will never have. Only through the proxy of Delphi can P. Burke be valued in society. Hicks explores this idea further, saying "P. Burke welcomes the chance to shed the ignominious flesh and bone that have caused her so much suffering" in order to become more valued. This means that P. Burke is willing to get rid of her own physical body in order to move up in society because she understands that it will never happen any other way. Social status within this society is so dependent on perfection and beauty that those who do not fall into that category want to move into better bodies. Hicks says this is precisely what gender disembodiment means within the context of "The Girl Who Was Plugged In".

=== Gender of the author ===
There is a relationship between the gender of the author and the message of the story. Hicks explains that Tiptree uses P. Burke as a metaphor for herself. The author, whose real name is Alice Bradley Sheldon, uses the male pen name of James Tiptree Jr. in order to be successful in the world of science fiction. Hicks says Sheldon "becomes P. Burke, which powers the public persona that consumers desire". Not only does Sheldon use a male pen name, but her writing style is viewed as masculine as well. This further contributes to the gender embodiment that Tiptree tries to undertake. Like those in the story, consumers in the science fiction world want a body image that represents what they deem worthy. In the story, people want an idealized female body, and in the real world science fiction consumers want a male body producing their stories. Hicks says the way in which P. Burke is ousted by Paul "suggests a conviction that her own body of work would not endure the revelation of her female body." In this method of analyzing the situation, Tiptree is suggesting that by writing this story she cannot be successful as a science fiction writer in her own body. Melissa Stevenson sums up this point in her article "Trying to Plug In: Posthuman Cyborgs and the Search for Connection" by saying that "The Girl Who Was Plugged In" "is a tale of transformations and masks, the story of a girl who is not who she seems to be, written by an author who is not exactly who "he" seemed to be".

=== A male author for a male audience ===
One notable characteristic of "The Girl Who Was Plugged In" is how the author used a male narrator to tell the story to a predominantly male audience in order to play with the reader's expectations of how the story will pan out. The story is being told by way of a male narrator most likely to a 1970's male science fiction consumer. The story continuously being told through a male point of view comes to highlight issues that male readers might have when reading this short story. According to Stevenson, Tiptree utilizes this way of telling the story in order to influence male readers expectations of P. Burke and of the ways the story will turn out upside down. The narrator rebukes the reader on several occasions for having these false expectations. Stevenson gives an example of this with the actual attempted suicide of P. Burke on the park bench. The narrator chastises the reader because he is not interested in P. Burke but rather the surrounding city. The expectation here is that the life of the ugly P. Burke is relatively unimportant compared to the surroundings to the targeted male reader. Stevenson points out that after this, the reader is rebuked three different times for not focusing on P. Burke but each time this happens, the narration is moved to descriptions of the futuristic soundings, presumably in accord with what the male reader truly desires to read about. This goes back to what Heather J. Hicks states about the importance and success of the ideal feminine body compared to the non-ideal feminine body. P. Burke’s body is considered unimportant and the way the story is written and paced suggests just that.

=== The performance of gender ===
Another theme of "The Girl Who Was Plugged In" is the performance of gender. According to Veronica Hollinger, this story is about P. Burke’s pursuit of the ideal feminine body. P. Burke desperately wants to achieve this ideal body, but she cannot due to her physical appearance. According to Hollinger, P. Burke is performing the gender ideal through a distance by controlling Delphi. Hollinger states that P. Burke’s performance here gives her an opportunity that she would not otherwise have given her real body to “mimic acceptable femininity". She also says that P. Burke “is the divinely feminine Delphi as long as she performs Delphi. P. Burke is the actor and Delphi is her role”. This performance was P. Burke’s way to a fairy-tale ending. Delphi can only be feminine if she were to be performed in a feminine way. Hollinger’s entire analysis can be seen in parallel with the analysis of Heather J. Hicks when she discusses how P. Burke uses Delphi to push herself up in the ranks of society. In order to have more opportunities in the society presented, P. Burke must perform femininity through Delphi.

== Literary criticism ==
The depiction of the body in "The Girl Who Was Plugged In" has been discussed by several feminist literary scholars. Amongst them are Scott Bukatman, Melissa Colleen Stevenson, Veronica Hollinger and Heather J. Hicks. Major themes in "The Girl Who Was Plugged In", as seen in the aforementioned authors articles referenced in this section, include disembodiment and re-embodiment, performance of femininity, oppression of the female body by cultural power structures and the female body in a technological society.

=== Constructed ideal of femininity ===
Veronica Hollinger, co-editor of the scholarly journal "Science Fiction Studies" of DePauw University, states in her article, "(Re)reading Queerly: Science Fiction, Feminism, and the Defamiliarization of Gender", that women are forced to conform to a constructed ideal of femininity in order to avoid being seen as a failure or, to some extent, incomplete. To Hollinger, "The Girl Who Was Plugged In" is about the ways women experience pressure from society to fulfill the set standards of femininity as seen in P. Burke's desperate desire to fully leaving her real body and re-embody permanently as Delphi. In a society where the only way to achieve happiness is by conforming completely to a constructed ideal, P. Burke has little choice but to live through the perfect girl body that is Delphi. Heather J. Hicks reinforces Hollinger's views in her article 'Whatever It Is That She’s Since Become': Writing Bodies of Text and Bodies of Women in James Tiptree, Jr.’s “The Girl Who Was Plugged In” and William Gibson’s “The Winter Market”" by stating that P. Burke denies her unappealing, real body. Hollinger sees P. Burke as a representation of the body that is utterly insignificant in the eyes of society. She discusses "The Girl Who Was Plugged In" in terms of how gender can act as a form of imprisonment when society expects an unrealistic display of femininity). P. Burke's existence becomes meaningful only when her mind controls the beautiful but "empty" body called Delphi, thus the female body in meeting with technology creates a separation between the body and the mind where P. Burke's only way of fulfilling the feminine beauty ideal is at the hands of technology. The futuristic world in which Tiptree Jr. stages her story has taught P. Burke to idolize the ideal that "the Gods" embody and so P. Burke willingly commits the act of "performing femininity."

=== Description of P. Burke ===
Another way disembodiment and oppression of the female body is seen in "The Girl Who was Plugged In" is by the words used to describe the main character, i.e. the description of P. Burke. Early in the story Tiptree says, “That’s good, because now you can see she’s the ugly of the world. A tall monument to pituitary dystrophy. No surgeon would touch her.” In the opinion of Scott Bukatman, of Stanford University, Tiptree forms the body into something unclean and decaying through phrases such as "dead daddy", "rotten girl" and "zombie". Hicks suggests the use of crude words for the main character only gets worse as the story progresses to emphasize an unappealing display of female disembodiment. According to Bukatman, the body in "The Girl Who Was Plugged In" is a dominating and central figure, but it also serves to represent a definite limitation. This relates to Hollingers statement of P. Burke's re-embodiment as Delphi becoming an actor/role relationship where P. Burke imagines herself as an actor that must fulfill a role, i.e. Delphi. This is a clear parallel to our own society's failure to recognize the individual women as separate from the constructed cultural ideal of femininity. Stevenson's view is that, to the deformed and shunned P. Burke, her life as Delphi is the only one that is actually real, because her original body left her excluded from the "human" category in the eyes of society, making her unable to form emotional connections or experience love until her re-embodiment as Delphi. Consequently, P. Burke feels more human as Delphi than as herself because society finally accepts and recognizes her existence. In other words, P. Burke is dependent on technology to be able to participate in society.

=== Relationships between women and technology ===
While Hollinger reads "The Girl Who Was Plugged In" through the ideological lens of gender as a performance, Hicks believes Tiptree connects female disembodiment with women's relationship to technology. Delphi, who was made for the sole purpose of advertising, is the living example of the perfect woman, and through her work for GTX she participates in reinforcing the cultural ideal of the femininity she's created after. In Hicks opinion, "Delphi's body is used in a capitalistic aim for the purpose of advertising to such an extent that her body becomes synonym with the products she advertises". However, Stevenson points out that, while Delphi is beautiful, she does not have an identity without the connection to P. Burke, which means they are both dependent on each other in order to function in society. Bukatman also argues that the act of merging with a machine, like P. Burke merges with Delphi, is, in feminist science fiction, an act of defeat, as opposed to the romanticized approach of cyberpunk where it is seen as necessary and a source of power. Bukatman points out that technological advances in science fiction are synonym with the furthering of a patriarchal power structure, as seen in the control of the female body in "The Girl Who Was Plugged In". Bukatman states; "In this sense, Tiptree's title refers to the state of being plugged in to male definitions of the feminine image and being; plugged in to the power structures of male technology.". He also points out the negative impact of altering your identity in Tiptree's story, and states that it serves as a symbol of oppression rather than liberation from society's conventions.

=== P. Burke and Delphi vs. Sheldon and Tiptree ===
Stevenson and Hicks both discuss the interesting and noteworthy parallel between P. Burke and Delphi and Alice Sheldon and her pseudonym, James Tiptree Jr. Stevenson points out that by writing under a male pseudonym, Sheldon was able to obtain a more "attractive" exterior with which she could connect to the male dominant science fiction writing community. Hicks believes that Sheldon herself may have experienced a form or disembodiment where she could only fulfill the ideals of the science fiction community by assuming a male persona. By the numerous ways Tiptree has touched on essential feminist topics in a single short story, it becomes clear why she was one of the most prominent feminist science fiction writers of her time.

== Publications ==
- The Ultimate Cyberpunk. Pat Cadigan. iBooks, 2002. ISBN 0-7434-5239-9
- New Dimensions 3. ed. Robert Silverberg. Doubleday, 1974.
- Warm Worlds and Otherwise. Collection of stories by James Tiptree, Jr. Ballantine, 1975.
- Her Smoke Rose Up Forever. Anthology of stories by James Tiptree, Jr. Tachyon, 2004.
- The James Tiptree Award Anthology 3, edited by Karen Joy Fowler, Pat Murphy, Debbie Notkin, and Jeffrey D. Smith. Tachyon, 2007.
- Tor Double #7: "Screwtop". Vonda N. McIntyre. "The Girl Who Was Plugged In". James Tiptree, Jr.. Tor, 1989. ISBN 0-8125-4554-0.

== Other media ==
- The story was adapted as a television film in 1998, for the Sci Fi Channel series Welcome to Paradox (episode 5).
- The story was adapted as a stage musical in 1992, as the first act of "Weird Romance: Two One-Act Musicals of Speculative Fiction". Music was by Alan Menken, Lyrics by David Spencer, Book by Alan Brennert and David Spencer. It starred Ellen Greene in its Off-Broadway premiere and the cast recording.
- Filmmaker Jennifer Kent is set to adapt the story for her third feature film with Sophie Thatcher in a dual lead role, playing both main characters. Principal photography is set to start in November 2026.

== See also ==
- Simulated reality
