= Houston, Houston, Do You Read? =

Novella by James Tiptree Jr.

- Short story by James Tiptree Jr.
- Cover of the 1989 Tor Double mass market paperback
- Country: United States
- Language: English
- Genre: Science fiction

Publication
- Published in: Aurora: Beyond Equality
- Publication type: Anthology
- Publisher: Fawcett
- Media type: Print
- Publication date: May 1976

"Houston, Houston, Do You Read?" is a science fiction novella by James Tiptree Jr. (pseudonym of Alice Sheldon). It won a Nebula Award for Best Novella and a Hugo Award for Best Novella in 1977.

The novella first appeared in the anthology Aurora: Beyond Equality, edited by Vonda N. McIntyre and Susan J. Anderson, published by Fawcett in May 1976. It was subsequently reprinted several times (amongst others in the James Tiptree collections Star Songs of an Old Primate in 1978 and Her Smoke Rose Up Forever in 1990) and in 1989 was published in a Tor Doubles mass market paperback (number eleven in that series) with the flipside novella "Souls" by Joanna Russ.

== Plot summary ==
The story is narrated in the third person from the point of view of Dr. Orren Lorimer, the science officer of the spaceship Sunbird, which is sent on a circumsolar mission at some time in the last two decades of the twentieth century. It is a three-man mission, the other two men being the commander, Major Norman Davis ("Dave") and Captain Bernhard Geirr ("Bud"); they have shared tight quarters, boring prepackaged food, and barely adequate life support systems for over a year. Having sustained considerable damage from a solar flare, they have passed around the Sun and look forward to returning to their families on Earth.

When they try to contact Mission Control in Houston, the only radio sources they can find are women, who gradually convince them that the solar flare has sent the Sunbird about three hundred years into the future. The women are from Earth, they have a lunar base and spaceships, and they rescue the Sunbird's crew. Their ship, the Gloria, turns out to be very large; the four women, with the help of "Andy", maintain an ecosystem and enjoy fresh food, comfortable sleep, and exercise. The Sunbird men (especially Dave, the mission leader) are dismayed to learn that they have no ranks or hierarchy, either on the ships or on Earth. Lorimer learns that the one man, Andy, is actually a woman on male hormones. In fact, no Y chromosomes at all have survived into the present time on Earth, due to an epidemic. The women reproduce by cloning 11,000 survivors of a disaster that wiped out all the rest of humanity. Each of the 11,000 women has produced a lineage of cloned sisters/daughters who develop great self-knowledge through these relationships.

The crew of the Gloria test the three men using a truth drug. Bud, the second in command, tries to rape one of the women, all the while insulting her, and hits Andy when the latter tries to interfere. Lorimer watches Bud's activities, always admiring the masculinity of violent men. Dave, when he learns the truth, pulls a gun and crucifix and starts giving everyone orders; Lorimer helps the women disarm him, accepting the women's decision that men pose too great a threat to their society, and must be killed. Although Lorimer is "more human" (as one woman says) than the other two, he, like Bud and Dave, finds a life without a patriarchal hierarchy unthinkable.

== Adaptations and influences ==
"Houston, Houston, Do You Read?" was adapted as a radio drama for the National Public Radio series Sci-Fi Radio. It originally aired as two half-hour shows, February 4 & 11, 1990.

"Houston, Houston, Do You Read?" is referenced in the dialogue of the first issue of the post-apocalyptic comic Y: The Last Man, which also depicts a plague that kills off all men, three astronauts who survived the plague in orbit, and a new female society that survives by cloning.
