= James Tiptree Jr. =

American sci-fi writer (1915–1987)

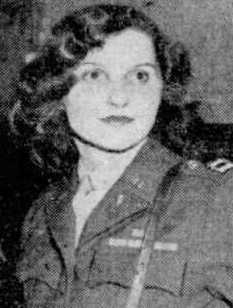
- Sheldon in January 1946
- Born: Alice Hastings Bradley; August 24, 1915; Chicago, Illinois, U.S.
- Died: May 19, 1987 (aged 71); McLean, Virginia, U.S.
- Education: American University, BA; George Washington University, PhD
- Occupations: Artist; intelligence analyst; research psychologist; writer
- Spouses: William Davey (1934–1941); Huntington D. Sheldon (1945–1987, their deaths)
- Relatives: Mary Hastings Bradley (mother); Herbert Edwin Bradley (father)
- Writing career
- Pen name: James Tiptree Jr.; Raccoona Sheldon
- Period: 1968–1988 (new fiction)
- Genre: Science fiction
- Notable awards: 1973 Nebula Award for Best Short Story; 1977 Nebula Award for Best Novella; 1978 Nebula Award for Best Novelette; 1987 World Fantasy Award—Collection

Signature
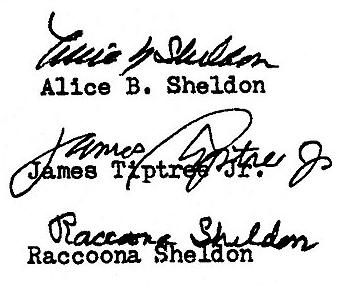

Alice Bradley Sheldon, better known as James Tiptree Jr. (born Alice Hastings Bradley; August 24, 1915 – May 19, 1987), was an American science fiction and fantasy author. It was not publicly known until 1977 that James Tiptree Jr. was a pen name of a woman, which she used from 1967 until her death. From 1974 to 1985, she also occasionally used the pen name Raccoona Sheldon. Tiptree was inducted into the Science Fiction Hall of Fame in 2012.

Tiptree's debut story collection, Ten Thousand Light-Years from Home, was published in 1973 and her first novel, Up the Walls of the World, was published in 1978. Her other works include the 1973 novelette "The Women Men Don't See", the 1974 novella "The Girl Who Was Plugged In", the 1976 novella "Houston, Houston, Do You Read?", the 1985 novel Brightness Falls from the Air, and the 1974 short story "Her Smoke Rose Up Forever".

== Early life, family and education ==
Alice Hastings Bradley came from a family in the intellectual enclave of Hyde Park, a university neighborhood in Chicago. Her father was Herbert Edwin Bradley, a lawyer and naturalist, and her mother was Mary Hastings Bradley, a prolific writer of fiction and travel books. From an early age she traveled with her parents, and in 1921–22, the family made their first trip to central Africa. During these trips, she played the role of the "perfect daughter, willing to be carried across Africa like a parcel, always neatly dressed and well behaved, a credit to her mother." This later contributed to her short story, "The Women Men Don't See".

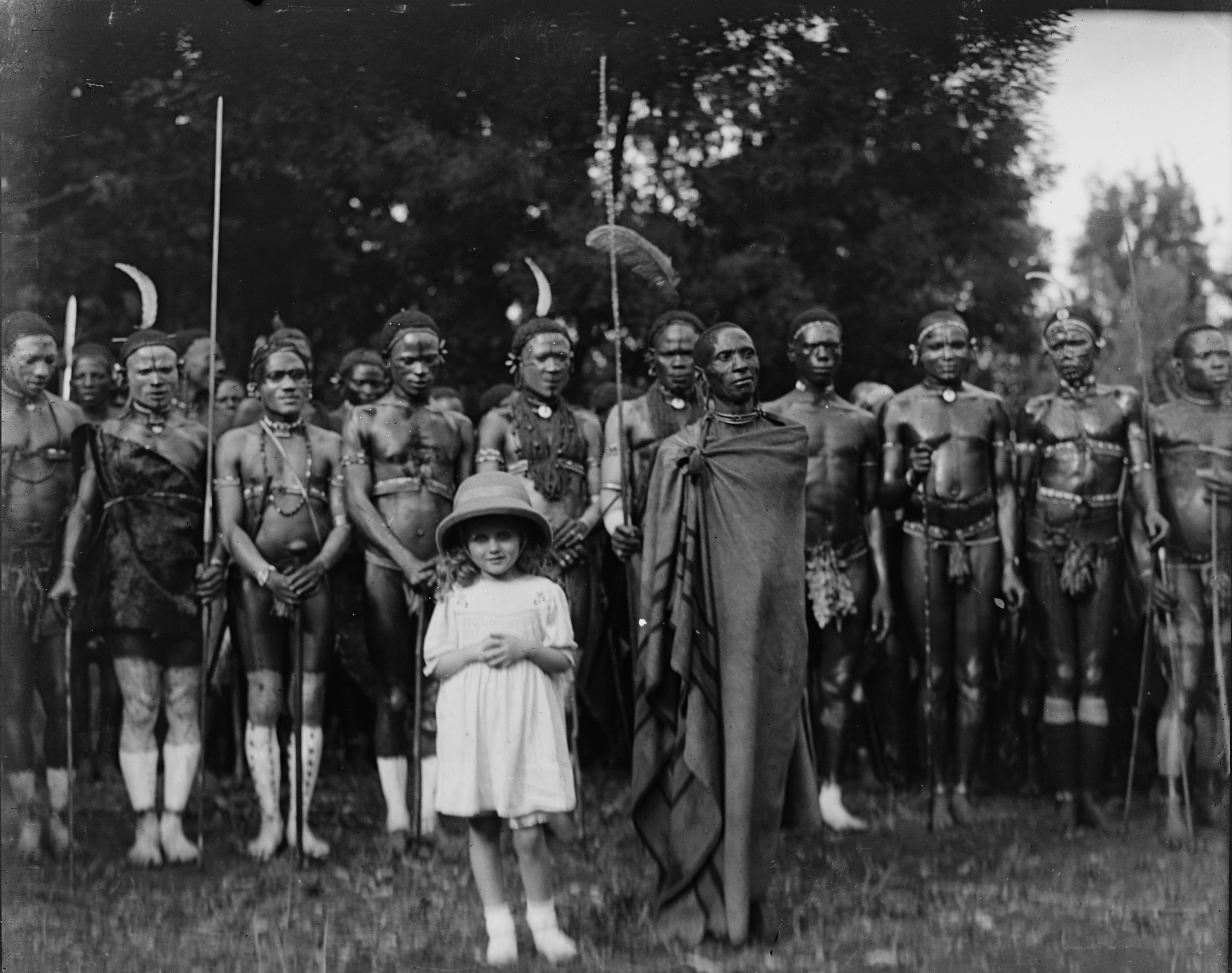
Alice Sheldon with the Kikuyu people, 1920s

She is the title character in two non-fiction accounts by her mother of their travels: Alice in Jungleland (1927) and Alice in Elephantland (1929). These were both travel books for children which included photos of young Alice visiting parts of Africa not yet fully discovered by Westerners. The illustrated cover of Alice in Jungleland is credited to Alice Hastings Bradley.

Between trips to Africa, Bradley attended school in Chicago. At the age of ten, she went to the University of Chicago Laboratory Schools, which was an experimental teaching workshop with small classes and loose structure. When she was fourteen, she was sent to finishing school in Lausanne in Switzerland, before returning to the US to attend boarding school in Tarrytown in New York.

== Adulthood and early career: 1934–1967 ==
Bradley was encouraged by her mother to seek a career, but her mother also hoped that she would get married and settle down. In 1934, at age 19, she met William (Bill) Davey and eloped to marry him. She dropped out of Sarah Lawrence College, which did not allow married students to attend. They moved to Berkeley, California, where they took classes and Davey encouraged her to pursue art. The marriage was not a success; he was an alcoholic and irresponsible with money and she disliked keeping house. The couple divorced in 1940. Later on, she became a graphic artist, a painter, and—still under the name "Alice Bradley Davey"—an art critic for the Chicago Sun between 1941 and 1942.

After the divorce, Bradley joined the Women's Army Auxiliary Corps where she became a supply officer. In 1942 she joined the United States Army Air Forces and worked in the Army Air Forces photo-intelligence group. She later was promoted to major, a high rank for women at the time. In the army, she "felt she was among free women for the first time." As an intelligence officer, she became an expert in reading aerial intelligence photographs.

In 1945, at the close of the war, while she was on assignment in Paris, she married her second husband, Huntington D. Sheldon, known as "Ting". She was discharged from the military in 1946, at which time she set up a small business in partnership with her husband. The same year, a non-fiction piece about Polish refugees working in Germany (entitled "The Lucky Ones") was published in the November 16, 1946 issue of The New Yorker, and credited to "Alice Bradley" in the magazine. In 1952 she and her husband were invited to join the CIA, which she accepted. At the CIA, she worked as an intelligence officer, but she did not enjoy the work. She resigned her position in 1955 and returned to college.

She studied for her bachelor of arts degree at American University (1957–1959). She received a doctorate from George Washington University in Experimental Psychology in 1967. She wrote her doctoral dissertation on the responses of animals to novel stimuli in differing environments. During this time, she wrote and submitted a few science fiction stories under the name James Tiptree Jr., in order to protect her academic reputation.

=== Art career ===
Bradley began illustrating when she was nine years old, contributing to her mother's book, Alice in Elephantland, a children's book about the family's second trip to Africa, appearing in it as herself. She later had an exhibit of her drawings of Africa at the Chicago Gallery, arranged by her parents. Although she illustrated several of her mother's books, she only sold one illustration during her lifetime, in 1931, to The New Yorker, with help from Harold Ober, a New York agent who worked with her mother. The illustration, of a horse rearing and throwing off its rider, sold for ten dollars.

In 1936, Bradley participated in a group show at the Art Institute of Chicago, to which she had connections through her family, featuring new American work. This was an important step forward for her painting career. During this time she also took private art lessons from John Sloan. Bradley disliked prudery in painting. While examining an anatomy book for an art class, she noticed that the genitals were blurred, so she restored the genitals of the figures with a pencil.

In 1939, her nude self-portrait titled Portrait in the Country was accepted for the "All-American" biennial show at the Corcoran Gallery in Washington, D.C., where it was displayed for six weeks. While these two shows were considered big breaks, she disparaged these accomplishments, saying that "only second rate painters sold" and she preferred to keep her works at home.

By 1940, Bradley felt she had mastered all the techniques she needed and was ready to choose her subject matter. However, she began to doubt whether she should paint. She kept working at her painting techniques, fascinated with the questions of form, and read books on aesthetics in order to know what scientifically made a painting "good". She stopped painting in 1941. As she was in need of a way to support herself, her parents helped her find a job as an art critic for the Chicago Sun.

== Science fiction career: 1967–1987 ==
Bradley discovered science fiction in 1924, when she read her first issue of Weird Tales, but she did not write any herself until years later. Unsure what to do with her new degrees and her careers, she began to write science fiction. She adopted the pseudonym of James Tiptree Jr. in 1967. The name "Tiptree" came from a variety of marmalade produced by Wilkin & Sons, and the "Jr." was her husband's idea. In an interview, she said: "A male name seemed like good camouflage. I had the feeling that a man would slip by less observed. I've had too many experiences in my life of being the first woman in some damned occupation." She also made the choice to start writing the type of science fiction she was interested in and "was surprised to find that her stories were immediately accepted for publication and quickly became popular."

Her first published short story was "Birth of a Salesman" in the March 1968 issue of Analog Science Fact & Fiction, edited by John W. Campbell. Three more followed that year in If and Fantastic. She continued to work as James Tiptree, Jr, keeping the identity a closely guarded secret, never attending book signings, science fiction conventions, or having in-person or even telephone contact with agents or editors. For close to a decade, Tiptree worked exclusively in the field of science fiction short stories, publishing several stories each year in various magazines, usually to acclaim within the industry. In 1974, Sheldon also started submitting stories to various outlets as "Raccoona Sheldon", but was not successful getting published until her other alter ego Tiptree wrote to publishers to intervene. After that, for a short time, the two personas were both selling work to various magazines.

The Tiptree pseudonym was successfully maintained until late 1977. Although "Tiptree" was widely known to be a pseudonym, it was generally understood its use was intended to protect the professional reputation of an intelligence community official, a career then strongly associated with men. Readers, editors and correspondents were permitted to assume the author's sex, and they generally but not invariably assumed Tiptree was male. For example, Harlan Ellison had introduced Tiptree's story "The Milk of Paradise" in the 1972 anthology Again, Dangerous Visions with the opinion that "[Kate] Wilhelm is the woman to beat this year, but Tiptree is the man". There was speculation Tiptree was a woman, however, based partially on the themes in her stories. In 1975, in the introduction to Warm Worlds and Otherwise, a collection of Tiptree's short stories, Robert Silverberg wrote: "[i]t has been suggested that Tiptree is female, a theory that I find absurd, for there is to me something ineluctably masculine about Tiptree's writing." Silverberg also likened Tiptree's writing to Ernest Hemingway's, arguing there was a "prevailing masculinity about both of them—that preoccupation with questions of courage, with absolute values, with the mysteries and passions of life and death as revealed by extreme physical tests, by pain and suffering and loss."

[Tiptree's work is] proof of what she said, that men and women can and do speak both to and for one another, if they have bothered to learn how.

— Ursula K. Le Guin, Khatru

Tiptree never made any public appearances, but she did correspond regularly with fans and other science fiction authors through the mail. When asked for biographical details, Tiptree/Sheldon was forthcoming in everything but her sex. According to her biographer, Julie Phillips, "No one had ever seen or spoken to the owner of this voice. He wrote letters, warm, frank, funny letters, to other writers, editors, and science fiction fans". In her letters to fellow writers such as Ursula K. Le Guin and Joanna Russ, she would present herself as a feminist man; however, Sheldon did not present herself as male in person. Writing was a way to escape what she felt was a male-dominated society, themes Tiptree explored in the short stories later collected in Her Smoke Rose Up Forever. One story in particular offers an excellent illustration of these themes. "Houston, Houston, Do You Read?" follows a group of astronauts who discover a future Earth whose male population has been wiped out; the remaining females have learned to get along just fine in their absence.

In 1976, Tiptree mentioned in a letter that "his" mother, also a writer, had died in Chicago. This detail led inquiring fans to find the obituary, with its reference to Alice Sheldon; soon all was revealed. Once the initial shock was over, Sheldon wrote to Le Guin, one of her closest friends, confessing her identity. She wrote, "I never wrote you anything but the exact truth, there was no calculation or intent to deceive, other than the signature which over 8 years became just another nickname; everything else is just plain me. The thing is, I am a 61-year-old woman named Alice Sheldon—nickname Alli—solitary by nature but married for 37 years to a very nice man considerably older [Huntington was 12 years her senior], who doesn't read my stuff but is glad I like writing".

After Sheldon's identity was revealed, several prominent science fiction writers suffered some embarrassment. Robert Silverberg, who had argued Tiptree could not be a woman from the evidence of her stories, added a postscript to his introduction to the second edition of Tiptree's Warm Worlds and Otherwise, published in 1979.

Only after her identity was exposed did she complete her first full-length novel, Up the Walls of the World, which was a Doubleday Science Fiction Book Club selection. Before that she had worked on and built a reputation only in the field of short stories.

After the revelation of her real identity, Sheldon continued to use the Tiptree name on her fiction for the rest of her life, with the exception of one further short story credited to "Raccoona Sheldon".

=== Themes ===
"Tip" was a crucial part of modern SF's maturing process ... "He"... wrote powerful fiction challenging readers' assumptions about everything, especially sex and gender.

— Suzy McKee Charnas, The Women's Review of Books

A constant theme in Sheldon's work is gender; she was influenced by the rise of second-wave feminism. A strong example is "The Women Men Don't See" (1973), where Sheldon, as in most of her stories, devises a convincing male point of view. We see the two women in the story (Ruth Parsons and her daughter) through the eyes of Don Fenton, who assesses them critically as possible sexual partners and is also concerned to protect them. He is confused when Ruth shows courage and common sense, failing to "fulfill stereotypical female roles", according to Anne Cranny-Francis. Ruth tries to explain the alienation of women in general and herself in particular, but to Fenton it seems nonsense. The Parsons' decision to leave Earth on an alien spaceship jars him into, if not understanding, at least remembering Ruth's words. The title of the short story itself reflects the idea that women are invisible during Sheldon's time. As Cranny-Francis states, "'The Women Men Don't See' is an outstanding example ... of the subversive use of genre fiction to produce an unconventional discursive position, the feminist subject."

== Death and legacy ==
Sheldon continued writing under the Tiptree pen name for another decade. In the last years of her life, she suffered from depression and heart trouble, while her husband began to lose his eyesight, becoming almost completely blind in 1986. In 1976, then 61-year-old Sheldon wrote to Silverberg expressing her desire to end her own life while she was still able-bodied and active; she said that she was reluctant to act upon this intention, as she did not want to leave her husband behind and could not bring herself to kill him. Later, she suggested to her husband that they make a suicide pact when their health began to fail. On July 21, 1977, she wrote in her diary: "Ting agreed to consider suicide in 4–5 years".

Ten years later, on May 19, 1987, Sheldon shot her husband and then herself; she telephoned her attorney after the first shooting to announce her actions. They were found dead, hand-in-hand in bed, in their Virginia home. According to biographer Julie Phillips, the suicide note Sheldon left was written in September 1979 and saved until needed. Although the circumstances surrounding the Sheldons' deaths are not clear enough to rule out caregiver murder–suicide (in that perhaps her husband was not ready to die), testimony of those closest to them suggests a suicide pact.

== Sexual orientation ==
Sheldon was attracted to women throughout her life and described herself as a lesbian in the years before her death. In 1980 she wrote to Joanna Russ and stated "I am a Lesbian [sic] [...] I like some men a lot, but from the start, before I knew anything it was always girls and women who lit me up". Sheldon had affairs with men and "passionate crushes" on women during her first marriage, and later remarked "the 2 or 3 great loves of my life were girls".

== James Tiptree Jr. Award ==
The James Tiptree Jr. Award, honoring works of science fiction and fantasy that expand or explore the understanding of gender, was created by authors Karen Joy Fowler and Pat Murphy in February 1991. Works of fiction such as Half Life by Shelley Jackson and Light by M. John Harrison have received the award. Due to controversy over the circumstances of her and her husband's deaths, the name of the award was changed to the Otherwise Award in 2019.

== Works ==
=== Short story collections ===
- Ten Thousand Light-Years from Home (1973)
- Warm Worlds and Otherwise (1975)
- Star Songs of an Old Primate (1978)
- Out of the Everywhere and Other Extraordinary Visions (1981)
- Byte Beautiful: Eight Science Fiction Stories (1985)
- The Starry Rift (1986) (linked stories)
- Tales of the Quintana Roo (1986) (linked stories)
- Crown of Stars (1988)
- Her Smoke Rose Up Forever (omnibus collection) (1990)
- The Voice That Murmurs in the Darkness (omnibus collection) (2023)

The abbreviation(s) after each title indicate its appearance in one or more of the following collections:

Collection title	Year of publication	Abbreviation
Ten Thousand Light-Years from Home	1973	LYFH
Warm Worlds and Otherwise	1975	WWO
Star Songs of an Old Primate	1978	SSOP
Out of the Everywhere and Other Extraordinary Visions	1981	OE
Byte Beautiful: Eight Science Fiction Stories	1985	BB
Tales of the Quintana Roo (linked stories)	1986	QR
The Starry Rift (linked stories)	1986	SR
Crown of Stars	1988	CS
Her Smoke Rose Up Forever (omnibus collection)	1990	SRU
Meet Me at Infinity (fiction, essays & other non-fiction)	2000	MM
The Voice That Murmurs in the Darkness (omnibus collection)	(2023)	VNM

- 1968
  - "The Mother Ship" (later retitled "Mamma Come Home") (novelette): LYFH
  - "Pupa Knows Best" (later retitled "Help"; novelette): LYFH
  - "Birth of a Salesman" (short story): LYFH
  - "Fault" (short story): WWO, VNM
  - "Happiness Is a Warm Spaceship" (short story): MM
  - "Please Don't Play With the Time Machine" (very short story): MM
  - "A Day Like Any Other' (very short story): MM
- 1969
  - "Beam Us Home" (short story): LYFH, BB, VNM
  - "The Last Flight of Doctor Ain" (short story): WWO, SRU
  - "Your Haploid Heart" (novelette): SSOP
  - "The Snows Are Melted, The Snows Are Gone" (novelette): LYFH, VNM
  - "Parimutuel Planet" (later retitled "Faithful to Thee, Terra, in Our Fashion") (novelette): LYFH
- 1970
  - "The Man Doors Said Hello To" (short story): LYFH, VNM
  - "I'm Too Big But I Love to Play" (novelette): LYFH
  - "The Nightblooming Saurian" (short story): WWO
  - "Last Night and Every Night" (short story): CS
- 1971
  - "The Peacefulness of Vivyan" (short story): LYFH, BB
  - "I'll Be Waiting for You When the Swimming Pool Is Empty" (short story): LYFH, BB
  - "And So On, and So On" (short story): SSOP, SRU
  - "Mother in the Sky with Diamonds" (novelette): LYFH
- 1972
  - "The Man Who Walked Home" (short story): LYFH, BB, SRU
  - "And I Have Come Upon This Place by Lost Ways" (novelette): WWO, SRU
  - "And I Awoke and Found Me Here on the Cold Hill's Side" (short story): LYFH, SRU
  - On the Last Afternoon (novella): WWO, SRU
  - "Painwise" (novelette): LYFH
  - "Forever to a Hudson Bay Blanket" (short story): LYFH
  - "Filomena & Greg & Rikki-Tikki & Barlow & the Alien" (later retitled "All the Kinds of Yes") (novelette): WWO, VNM
  - "The Milk of Paradise" (short story): WWO
  - "Amberjack" (short story): WWO
  - "Through a Lass Darkly" (short story): WWO
  - "The Trouble Is Not in Your Set" (short story): MM (previously unpublished)
  - "Press Until the Bleeding Stops" (short story): MM
- 1973
  - "Love Is the Plan the Plan Is Death" (short story): WWO, BB, SRU
  - "The Women Men Don't See" (novelette): WWO, SRU
  - "The Girl Who Was Plugged In" (novelette): WWO, SRU
- 1974
  - "Her Smoke Rose Up Forever" (novelette): SSOP, SRU
  - "Angel Fix" (novelette, under the name "Raccoona Sheldon"): OE
- 1975
  - A Momentary Taste of Being (novella): SSOP, SRU
- 1976
  - "Your Faces, O My Sisters! Your Faces Filled of Light!" (short story, under the name Raccoona Sheldon): OE, BB, SRU
  - "Beaver Tears" (short story, under the name Raccoona Sheldon): OE
  - "She Waits for All Men Born" (short story): SSOP, SRU
  - Houston, Houston, Do You Read? (novella): SSOP, SRU (Hugo award winner; Nebula award winner)
  - "The Psychologist Who Wouldn't Do Awful Things to Rats" (novelette): SSOP, VNM
- 1977
  - "The Screwfly Solution" (novelette, under the name Raccoona Sheldon): OE, SRU
  - "Time-Sharing Angel" (short story): OE, VNM
- 1978
  - "We Who Stole the Dream" (novelette): OE, SRU
- 1980
  - Slow Music (novella): OE, SRU
  - "A Source of Innocent Merriment" (short story): OE
- 1981
  - "Excursion Fare" (novelette): BB, VNM
  - "Lirios: A Tale of the Quintana Roo" (later retitled "What Came Ashore at Lirios") (novelette): QR, VNM
  - "Out of the Everywhere" (novelette): OE, VNM
  - With Delicate Mad Hands (novella): OE, BB, SRU
- 1982
  - "The Boy Who Waterskied to Forever" (short story): QR
- 1983
  - "Beyond the Dead Reef" (novelette): QR
- 1985
  - "Morality Meat" (novelette, under the name Racoona Sheldon): CS
  - The Only Neat Thing to Do (novella): SR, VNM
  - "All This and Heaven Too" (novelette): CS
  - "Trey of Hearts" (short story): MM (previously unpublished)
- 1986
  - "Our Resident Djinn" (short story): CS
  - "In the Great Central Library of Deneb University" (short story): SR
  - Good Night, Sweethearts (novella): SR
  - Collision (novella): SR
  - The Color of Neanderthal Eyes (novella): MM
- 1987
  - "Second Going" (novelette): CS
  - "Yanqui Doodle" (novelette): CS, VNM
  - "In Midst of Life" (novelette): CS, VNM
- 1988
  - "Come Live with Me" (novelette): CS
  - Backward, Turn Backward (novella): CS
  - "The Earth Doth Like a Snake Renew" (novellette): CS [written in 1973]

=== Novels ===
- Up the Walls of the World (1978)
- Brightness Falls from the Air (1985)

=== Other collections ===
- Neat Sheets: The Poetry of James Tiptree Jr. (Tachyon Publications, 1996)
- Meet Me at Infinity (a collection of previously uncollected and unpublished fiction, essays and other non-fiction, with much biographical information, edited by Tiptree's friend Jeffrey D. Smith) (2000)

=== Adaptations ===
- "The Man Who Walked Home" (1977): comic book adaptation in Canadian underground comic Andromeda Vol. 2, No. 1; September; Silver Snail Comics, Ltd.; Toronto; pp. 6–28. Pencils by John Allison, inks by Tony Meers.
- "Houston, Houston, Do You Read?" (1990): radio drama for the National Public Radio series Sci-Fi Radio. Originally aired as two half-hour shows, February 4 and 11.
- "Yanqui Doodle" (1990): half-hour radio drama for the National Public Radio series Sci-Fi Radio. Aired March 18.
- Weird Romance (1992): Off-Broadway musical by Alan Menken. Act 1 is based on "The Girl Who Was Plugged In".
- "The Girl Who Was Plugged In" (1998): television film: episode 5 of the series Welcome to Paradox
- The Screwfly Solution (2006): television film: season 2, episode 7 of the series Masters of Horror
- Xenophilia (2011): based on the lives and works of Tiptree and Connie Converse; arranged and choreographed by Maia Ramnath; produced by the aerial dance and theater troupe Constellation Moving Company, performed at the Theater for the New City, presented November 10–13, 2011. Reviewer Jen Gunnels writes, "The performance juxtaposed some of Tiptree's short stories with Converse's songs, mixing in biographical elements of both women while kinesthetically exploring both through dance and aerial work on trapeze, lyra (an aerial ring), and silks (two lengths of fabric which the artist manipulates to perform aerial acrobatics). The result was elegant, eerie, and deeply moving."

== Awards and honors ==
The Science Fiction Hall of Fame inducted Tiptree in 2012. She also won several annual awards for particular works of fiction (typically the preceding calendar year's best):

- Hugo Awards: 1974 novella, The Girl Who Was Plugged In; 1977 novella, Houston, Houston, Do You Read?
- Nebula Awards: 1973 short story, "Love Is the Plan the Plan Is Death"; 1976 novella, Houston, Houston, Do You Read?; 1977 novelette, "The Screwfly Solution" (published as by Raccoona Sheldon)
- World Fantasy Award: 1987 collection, Tales of the Quintana Roo
- Locus Award: 1984 short story, "Beyond the Dead Reef"; 1986 novella, The Only Neat Thing to Do
- Science Fiction Chronicle Award: 1986 novella, The Only Neat Thing to Do
- Jupiter Award: 1977 novella, Houston, Houston, Do You Read?

Japanese-language translations of her fiction also won two Hayakawa Awards and three Seiun Awards as the year's best under changing designations (foreign, overseas, translated). The awards are voted by magazine readers and annual convention participants respectively:

- Hayakawa's S-F Magazine Reader's Award, short fiction: 1993, "With Delicate Mad Hands" (1981); 1997, "Come Live with Me" (1988)
- Seiun Award, short and long fiction: 1988, "The Only Neat Thing to Do" (1985); 2000, "Out of the Everywhere" (1981); 2008, Brightness Falls from the Air (1985)

She was awarded a 2010 Solstice Award (since renamed the Kate Wilhem Solstice Award) by the SFWA.

== See also ==
- Akeley-Derscheid Expedition
