= Women in speculative fiction =

There are several aspects to the roles of women in speculative fiction, including their participation as authors of speculative fiction and their role in speculative fiction fandom.

Speculative fiction, especially science fiction, has traditionally been viewed as a male-oriented genre. But there have been women authors and women fans from the start.

Regarding authors: Women have written utopian novels for a long time, with Margaret Cavendish publishing the first (The Blazing World) in the seventeenth century. Early published fantasy was written by and for any gender. Frankenstein (1818), by Mary Shelley, has been called the first science fiction novel.

But there were relatively few women speculative fiction authors in the early 20th century. In 1948, 10–15% of science fiction writers were female. That’s changed over time; in 1999, women comprised 36% of the Science Fiction and Fantasy Writers of America's professional members. The percentage of women authors among finalists in the fiction categories for the Hugo Award have ranged from as low as 0% in 1960 to as high as 79% in 2021 (with variation in that percentage over time).

As for fandom: Women have been active in science fiction fandom for a number of decades.

== Writers ==
Science fiction originally had a reputation of being created by men for other men, though the genre had women writers, such as Clare Winger Harris, Miriam Allen deFord, and Gertrude Barrows Bennett, from the beginning. Until the late 1960s, women did not win major science fiction awards, such as the Hugos. The 1966 "Analog Science Fiction and Fact All-Time Poll" did not list any novels by women and the 1973 "Locus All-Time Favorite Authors Poll" was over 90% male. One of the two women in Locus's poll, Andre Norton, had been "gender ambiguous" for many of her readers. Other female writers of the era, such as C. L. Moore and Leigh Brackett, also used ambiguous or male names. Women who wrote under their own names, such as Zenna Henderson, initially wrote more "domestic" material concerning teachers and mothers. A partial exception was Katherine MacLean, who wrote sociology- and psychology-oriented fiction and rarely used a male name.

Eric Leif Davin argues in Partners in Wonder that science fiction's "male-oriented" reputation is unjustified and that it was a "safe haven" for outsiders, including women. Davin reports that only L. Taylor Hansen concealed her sex in early years, and that C. L. Moore wanted to hide her career as a science fiction author from her job.

Women writers were in a minority: during the '50s and '60s, almost 1,000 stories published in science fiction magazines by over 200 female-identified authors between 1926 and 1960 were documented, making women writers 10-15% of contributors. His is a minority view, "at odds with the common perception of science fiction".

The advent of second wave feminism in the 1960s, combined with the growing view of science fiction as the literature of ideas, led to an influx of female science fiction writers, and some saw this influx as the first appearance of women into the genre. In the 1960s and 1970s, authors such as Ursula K. Le Guin (who debuted in 1963) and Joanna Russ (who debuted in the 1950s) began to consciously explore feminist themes in works such as The Left Hand of Darkness and The Female Man, creating a self-consciously feminist science fiction.

As of 2013, publisher statistics indicate that men still outnumber women about two to one among English-language speculative fiction writers aiming for professional publication, but that the percentages vary considerably by genre. The following numbers are based on the 503 submissions received by Tor Books, a major science fiction and fantasy publisher, between January and July 2013.

Submissions by genre	Women	Men
Historical, epic or high fantasy	33%	67%
Urban fantasy or paranormal romance	57%	43%
Horror	17%	83%
Science fiction	22%	78%
Young adult fiction	68%	32%
Other or unclassifiable	27%	73%
Overall	37%	63%

Ten women have been named Grand Master of science fiction by the Science Fiction and Fantasy Writers of America:

- Andre Norton (1984)
- Ursula K. Le Guin (2003)
- Anne McCaffrey (2005)
- Connie Willis (2012)
- C.J. Cherryh (2016)
- Jane Yolen (2017)
- Lois McMaster Bujold (2020)
- Nalo Hopkinson (2021)
- Mercedes Lackey (2022)
- Robin McKinley (2023)

Doris Lessing, who wrote the five-novel science fiction series Canopus in Argos, received the 2007 Nobel Prize in Literature.

The Encyclopedia of Science Fiction lists three notable women authors of military science fiction: Lois McMaster Bujold; Elizabeth Moon (particularly her Familias Regnant stories such as Hunting Party (1993)), and Karen Traviss.

Below is an evolving list of women authors in science fiction emphasizing diversity and innovation across various subgenres:

- Terry Ann Adams (1946- )
- Linda Addison (1952- )
- Charlie Jane Anders (1969- )
- Ryka Aoki
- Catherine Asaro (1955- )
- Pauline Ashwell (1926-2015)
- Margaret Atwood (1939- )
- Wilhelmina Baird (1935- )
- Kage Baker (1952-2010)
- Celeste Rita Baker (1958-2025)
- Gwen Benaway (1987- )
- Gertrude Barrows Bennet (1884-1948)
- Marcia Joanne Bennett (1945- )
- Lauren Beukes (1976- )
- Imogen Binnie (1978/1979- )
- Jay D. Blakeney (real name Deborah Chester) (1957- )
- Maya Kathryn Bohnhoff (1954- )
- Margaret Wander Bonnano (1950-2021)
- Amanda Bouchet
- Leigh Brackett (successfully authored her own titles and ghost wrote for George Sanders) (1915-1978)
- Mary E. Bradley Lane (1844-1930)
- Marion Zimmer Bradley (1930-1999)
- Jennifer Marie Brissett (1969- )
- Rosel George Brown (1926-1967)
- Adrienne Maree Brown (1978- )
- Dorothy Bryant (1930-2017)
- Lois McMaster Bujold (1949- )
- Emma Bull (1954- )
- Otis Kidwell Burger (1965-2023)
- Chesya Burke
- Octavia E. Butler (1947-2006)
- Maria Campbell (1939- )
- Margaret Cavendish (1623/1624-1673)
- Becky Chambers (1985- )
- Suzy McKee Charnas (1939-2023)
- Carolyn Janice Cherry (pen name C. J. Cherryh) (1942- )
- Deborah Chester (pen name Jay D. Blakeney) (1957- )
- Jo Clayton (1939-1998)
- Mildred Clingerman (1918-1997)
- Suzanne Collins (1962- )
- Storm Constantine (1956-2021)
- Susan Coon (1945- )
- Susan Cooper (1935- )
- Ann C. Crispin (1950-2013)
- Myrna Culbreath (1938- )
- Julie E. Czerneda (1955- )
- Miriam Allen DeFord (1888-1975)
- Grace Dillon
- Cherie Dimaline (1975- )
- Ariel Djanikian
- Paula E. Downing (1951-2017)
- Aliette de Bodard (1982- )
- Debra Doyle (1952-2020)
- Diane Duane (1952- )
- Tananarive Due (1966- )
- Phyllis Eisenstein (1946-2020)
- Suzette Haden Elgin (1936-2015)
- Meg Elison (1982- )
- Amal El-Mohtar (1984- )
- Sylvia Engdahl (1933- )
- Louise Erdrich (1954- )
- Heid E. Erdrich (1963- )
- Isabel Fall
- Jane S. Fancher (1952- )
- Cynthia Felice (1942- )
- Sheila Finch (1935- )
- Magnus Flight (writing duo Christina Lynch and Meg Showery)
- Karen Joy Fowler (1950- )
- Leslie Gadallah (1939- )
- Jaymee Goh
- Jewelle Gomez (1948- )
- Phyllis Gotlieb (1926-2009)
- Susan Grant (1982- )
- Gayle Greeno (1949- )
- Pauline Margaret Griffin (pen name P.M. Griffin) (1947-2020)
- Nicola Griffith (1960- )
- Cherry Barbara Grimm (pen name Cherry Wilder) (1930-2002)
- Eileen Gunn (1945- )
- Andrea Hairston (1952- )
- Barbara Hambley (1951- )
- Virginia Hamilton (1936-2002)
- Lucile Taylor Hanson (pen name L. Taylor Hanson) (1897-1976)
- Thea Von Harbou (1988-1954)
- Joy Harjo (1951- )
- Tara Harper
- Clare Winger Harris (1891-1968)
- Zenna Henderson (1917-1983)
- Nathalie Henneberg (pen name N.C. Henneberg collaborating with husband Charlie Henneberg) (1910-1977)
- Lynn Hightower (1956- )
- Nalo Hopkinson (1960- )
- Monica Hughes (1925-2003)
- Kameron Hurley
- N.K. Jemisin (1972- )
- Jane Jeppson (pen name J.O. Jeppson) (1926-2019)
- Alaya Dawn Johnson (1982- )
- Diana Wynne Jones (1934-2011)
- Cyril Judd (pen name for writing collaboration between Judith Merril and Cyril M. Kornbluth)
- Melanie Kent
- Les Killough (1942)
- Katherine Eliska Kimbriel
- Robin Wall Kimmerer (1953- )
- Melanie Kent
- Aditi Khorana
- Mary Robinette Kowal (1969- )
- Bibiana Krall
- Mercedes Lackey (1950- )
- Larissa Lai (1967- )
- Joy Leach
- Ann Leckie (1966- )
- Tanith Lee (1947-2015)
- Fonda Lee (1979- )
- Ursula K. Le Guin (1929-2018)
- Deborah Lessing (1919-2013)
- Jacqueline Lichtenberg (1942- )
- Malinda Lo
- Karen Lord (1968- )
- Karin Lowachee
- Judith Merril (pen name Cyril Judd for writing collaboration with Cyril M. Kornbluth)
- Christina Lynch (pen name Magnus Flight)
- Elizabeth A. Lynn (1946- )
- C.C. MacApp (real name Carol MacApp) (1917-1971)
- Katherine Maclean (1925-2019)
- Sondra Marshak (1942- )
- Adrienne Marten-Barnes (1942-2015)
- Arkady Martine (1985- )
- Ann Maxwell (1944- )
- Janet McAdams (1957- )
- Ann McCaffrey (1926-2011)
- Ashley McConnell
- Vonda N. McIntyre (1948-2019)
- Helen Merrick
- Judith Merril (1923-1997)
- Melisa Michaels (1946-2019)
- Elizabeth Moon (1945- )
- Catherine Lucille Moore (pen name C.L. Moore) (1911-1987)
- Janet Morris (1946-2024)
- Tamsyn Muir (1985- )
- Pat Murphy (1955- )
- Nichelle Nichols (1932-2022)
- Jeanette Ng
- Alice Andre Norton (born Alice Mary Norton, pen names include Andre Norton, Andrew North, and Allen Weston) (1912-2005)
- Nnedi Okorafor (1974- )
- Malka Older (1977- )
- Kathleen O’Malley
- Nene Ormes
- An Owomoyela
- Barbara Paul (1931-2022)
- Marge Piercy (1936- )
- Casey Plett (1987- )
- Susan Power (1961- )
- Roberta Rambelli (pen name Robert Rainbell) (1928-1996)
- Marta Randall (1948- )
- Kit Reed (1932-2017)
- Jane Rice (1913-2003)
- Rebecca Roanhorse (1971- )
- Eden Robinson (1968- )
- Eleanor Robinson (died 1988)
- Jeanne Robinson (1948-2010)
- Kelly Robson (1967- )
- Janet Rogers (1952- )
- Mary Rosenblum (1952-2018)
- Kristine Kathryn Rusch (1960- )
- Joanna Russ (1937-2011)
- Maria Russell (1951-2013)
- Kiini Ibura Salaam (1973- )
- Sophia Samatar (1971- )
- Pamela Sargent (1948- )
- Josephine Saxton (1935-2003)
- Melissa Scott (1960- )
- Idris Seabright (real name Margaret St. Clair) (1911-1995)
- Nisi Shawl (1955- )
- Alice Sheldon (pen name James Tiptree Jr.) (1915-1987)
- Mary Shelly (1797-1851)
- Meg Howery (collaborative writer for pen name Magnus Flight with Christina Lynch)
- Susan Shwartz (1949- )
- Leslie Marmon Silko (1948- )
- Leanne Betasamosake Simpson (1971- )
- Vandana Singh (1962- )
- Kathleen Sky (1943- )
- Melinda M. Snodgrass (1951- )
- Evelyn Smith (1922-2000)
- Mary Staton (1947- )
- Margaret St. Clair (pen name Idris Seabright) (1911-1995)
- Marti Steussy (1955- )
- Emily St. John Mandel (1979- )
- Tricia Sullivan (1968- )
- Mary Vigiliante Szydlowski
- Sherry Tepper (1929-2016)
- Kai Cheng Thom (1991- )
- Sheree Renée Thomas (1972- )
- Karin Tidbeck (1977- )
- Lisa Tuttle (1952- )
- Rena Vale (1898-1983)
- Catherynne M. Valente (1979- )
- Sydney Van Scyoc (1929-2023)
- Joan D. Vinge (1948- )
- Thea Von Harbou (1888-1954)
- Anne Walker
- Barbara Walton
- Sharon Webb (1936-2010)
- Aliya Whiteley (1974- )
- Kate Wilhelm (1928-2018)
- Tess Williams (1954-2025)
- Connie Willis (1945- )
- G. Willow Wilson (Gwendolyn Willow Wilson) (1982- )
- Pauline Winslow (1926-2014)
- Patricia Wrightson (1921-2010)
- Isabel Yap
- Jane Yolen (1939- )
- Sarah Zettle (1966- )

== Fans ==
Women have been active in science fiction fandom for some time, and the Oxford Dictionary of Science Fiction dates the coinage "femfan" (sometimes: "femme fan") to as early as 1944. Leigh Brackett says of the history of women in SF "There always were a certain number of women fans and women readers." Labalestier quotes the editor of Startling Stories, writing in 1953, as saying

Ten years ago [i.e., 1943] stf fans were practically all male, today with or without benefit of fan activities, a lot of girls and housewives and other members of the sex are quietly reading science fiction and beginning to add their voices to the bable... We honestly never expected such a surge of female women into science fiction

A 1958 self-reported If survey found that 31% of respondents were women, which the editors said was "surprisingly high (at least to us)". Robert Silverberg said "probably the first appearance of the 'Women in Science Fiction' panel soon to become a fixture of these conventions" was at the 10th World Science Fiction Convention in 1953; which was also the first World Science Fiction Convention chaired by a woman, author Julian May.

While science fiction fandom has been an organized phenomenon for decades—presaging the organized fandoms of other genres and media—the study of science fiction fandom within cultural studies and science fiction studies is relatively new. Consequently, assertions about the prevalence of women in fandom are largely anecdotal and personal, and sometimes contradictory. Most prominent among these assertions is the claim that it was the advent of the original Star Trek television series which brought large quantities of women into fandom. This claim is critically analyzed by Davin, who finds it poorly founded, and cites a long history of female involvement in fandom decades prior to Star Trek; Larbalestier also cites women active in science fiction fandom before the late 1960s and early 1970s.

However, women became more visibly present in fandom, and more organized, in the 1970s. The slash movement among fans began, as far as anyone can tell, with Diane Marchant's publication of the first known Star Trek "Kirk/Spock" story in Grup #3 in 1974. 1974 also saw the creation of The Witch and the Chameleon, the first explicitly feminist fanzine. The fanzine Khatru published a "Women in Science Fiction" symposium in 1975 (one of the "males" who participated was James Tiptree, Jr.). In 1976, Susan Wood set up a panel on "women and science fiction" at MidAmericon, the 1976 Worldcon; this ultimately led to the founding of A Women's APA, the first women's amateur press association. Also in 1976, WisCon, the world's leading—and for many years, only—feminist science fiction convention and conference was founded: an annual conference in Madison, Wisconsin. In turn, as a result of discussions at WisCon, institutions such as the Tiptree Awards and Broad Universe arose to address questions of gender in speculative fiction and issues peculiar to women writers of speculative fiction. Some of the same people involved in creating WisCon also founded the feminist fanzine Janus, which was thrice nominated for the Hugo Award for Best Fanzine (1978–1980).

However, the perception of speculative fiction as mainly a men's genre continues to be widespread. As the inclusion of women within science fiction and fantasy more broadly has become obvious, the specificity of the perception has evolved. For instance, the still widely held view that "science fiction and fantasy are men's genres" has been refined by some to distinguish between science fiction as a genre mainly appealing to men, and fantasy, which is generally seen as being more accommodating to women (some subgenres, particularly urban fantasy, with female protagonists, and paranormal romance are seen as being more popular with women than with men). Little formal study has supported any of these distinctions, whether based on readers, writers, or characters.

This perception has often been upheld and enforced by men, perhaps to protect themselves from what fandom researcher Henry Jenkins called the stereotype that "men are feminized and/or desexualized through their intimate engagement with mass culture". Women fans of speculative fiction are called pejorative terms like "fake geek girl"and are chastised for their love of "Mary Sue" characters, while at the same time male characters with the same qualities are beloved, and can even face harassment for their participation in fandom. However, Jenkins writes, speculative fiction is especially popular with women who identify with feminism because they reject the gender roles that are traditionally seen in other types of fiction.

== Gender ==
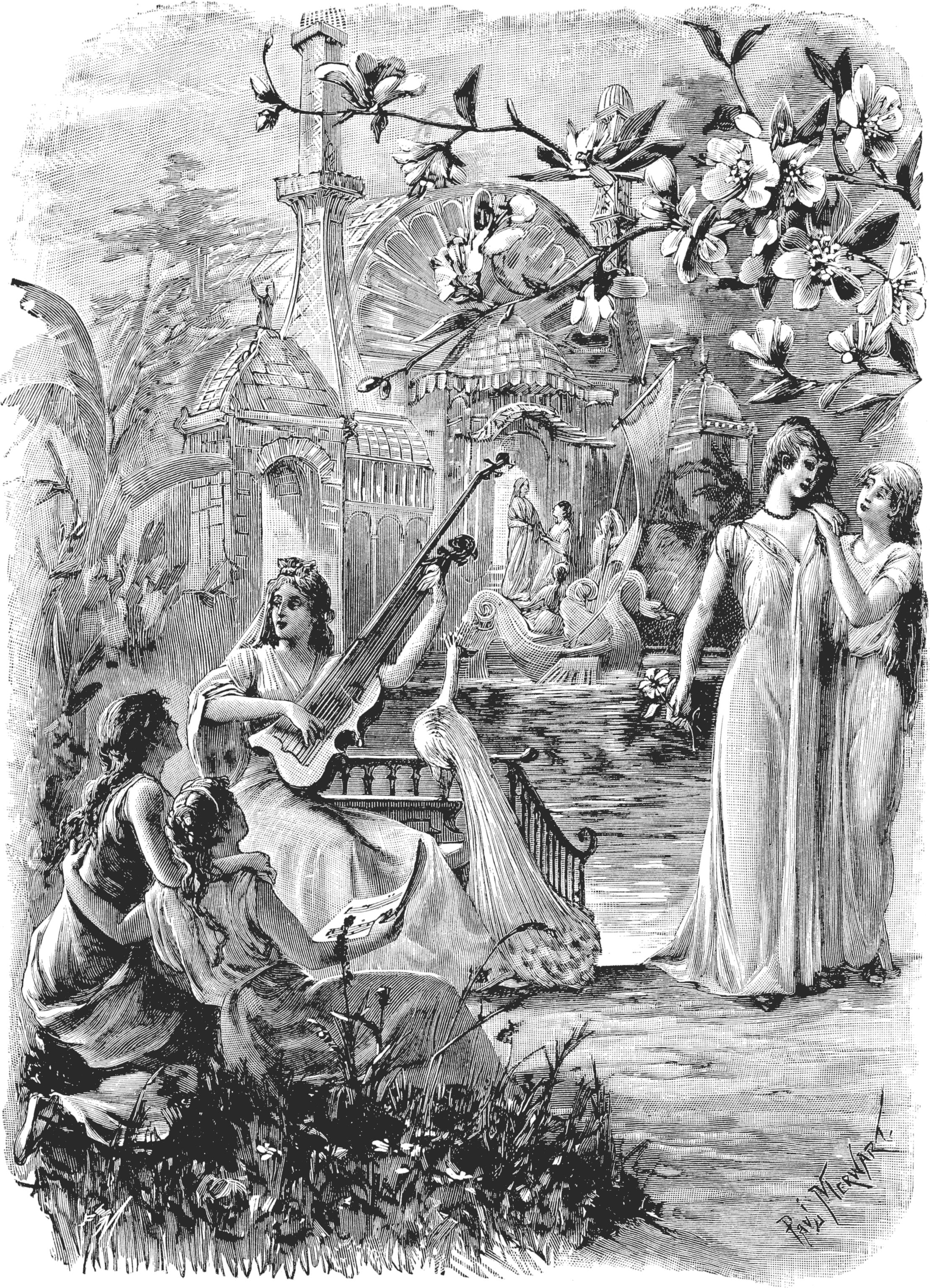
A 1911 illustration from Camille Flammarion's La Fin du monde. It depicts a fictional future society in which all women are beautiful and have lovely voices.

[...] science fiction and fantasy pulp magazines were directed mainly at boys[...]. Female characters were only occasionally included in science fiction pulp stories; the male protagonists' lengthy explanations to the women with limited knowledge revealed the plots

— Garber, Eric and Paleo, Lyn "Preface" in Uranian worlds.

The highlighting of gender in science fiction has varied widely throughout the genre's history. Some writers and artists have challenged their society's gender norms in producing their work; others have not. Speculative and science fiction fandoms have generally become less proportionately male over time. In step with this, so have the casts of characters portrayed in fiction; similarly, considerations of gender in speculative and science fiction have increased in frequency and nuance over time.

== Influence of political movements ==
The study of women within science fiction in the last decades of the twentieth century was driven in part by the feminist and gay liberation movements, and has included strands of the various related and spin-off movements, such as gender studies and queer theory.

In the 1970s, a number of events began to focus on women in fandom, professional science fiction, and as characters. In 1974, Pamela Sargent published an influential anthology, Women of Wonder: Science Fiction Stories by Women, About Women—the first of many anthologies to come that focused on women or gender rules. Additionally, movement among writers concerned with feminism and gender roles sprang up, leading to a genre of "feminist science fiction" including Joanna Russ' 1975 The Female Man, Samuel R. Delany's 1976 Trouble on Triton: An Ambiguous Heterotopia, and Marge Piercy's 1976 Woman on the Edge of Time.

The 1970s also saw a vibrant gay liberation movement, which made its presence known in science fiction, with gay/lesbian and gay/lesbian-friendly panels at conventions and articles in fanzines; gay/lesbian content increasingly present in the fiction itself; the gay/lesbian bookstore "A Different Light", which took its name from Elizabeth A. Lynn's novel of the same name; and a focus on LGBT issues in the pages of feminist publications.

More recently, the 2010s have sparked a rebirth for speculative fiction. This revival of the genre can be attributed to the political chaos that came with the 2016 election in which Donald J. Trump won the U.S. presidency. Margaret Atwood's speculative science fiction novel The Handmaid's Tale was adapted into a television series Hulu special and saw such success that it was renewed for a second season. Many critics made the connection between The Handmaid's Tale and President Trump's America in multiple reviews of the series. The fears that came with such a controversial election have given way to a revival of speculative fiction in the 2010s.

== Media adaptations ==
Margaret Atwood's The Handmaid's Tale was adapted into a film in 1990, directed by Volker Schlöndorff. The film received a 31% positive review on Rotten Tomatoes with an average rating of 4.8/10.

The Handmaid's Tale was also adapted into a ten-episode television series Hulu special released on April 26, 2017. The series saw such success that it was renewed for a second season set to release in April 2018.

Octavia Butler's speculative science/fantasy fiction novel Dawn, the first in her trilogy titled Lilith's Brood, is currently being adapted for television by producers Ava DuVernay and Charles D. King's Macro Ventures alongside writer Victoria Mahoney. There is no projected release date for the adaptation yet.

== See also ==
- Feminist science fiction
- Janus (science fiction magazine)
- The Witch and the Chameleon
- Wiscon
- Battle of the sexes in science fiction
