= Clare Winger Harris =

American writer (1891–1968)

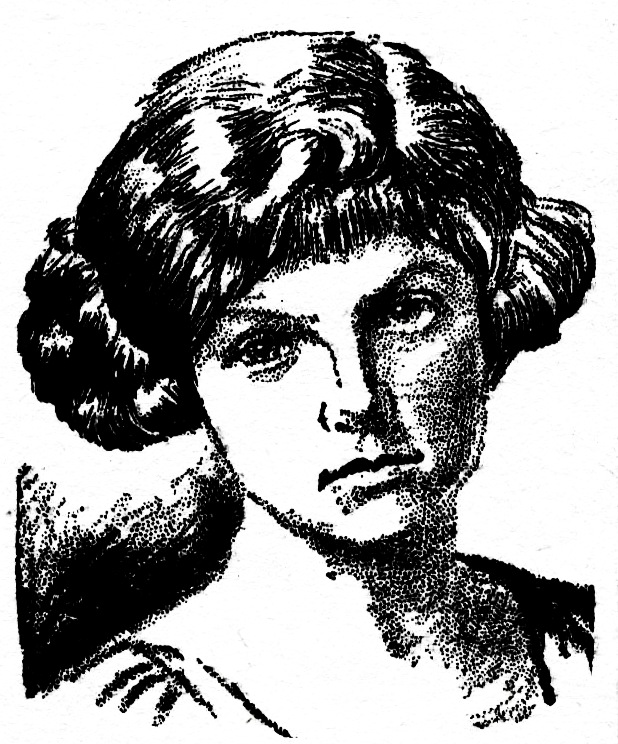
- Clare Winger Harris, as pictured in the 1929 debut issue of Science Wonder Quarterly
- Born: Clare Winger; January 18, 1891; Freeport, Illinois
- Died: October 26, 1968 (age 77); Pasadena, California
- Spouse: Frank Clyde Harris
- Children: 3
- Writing career
- Period: 1923–1933
- Genre: Science fiction

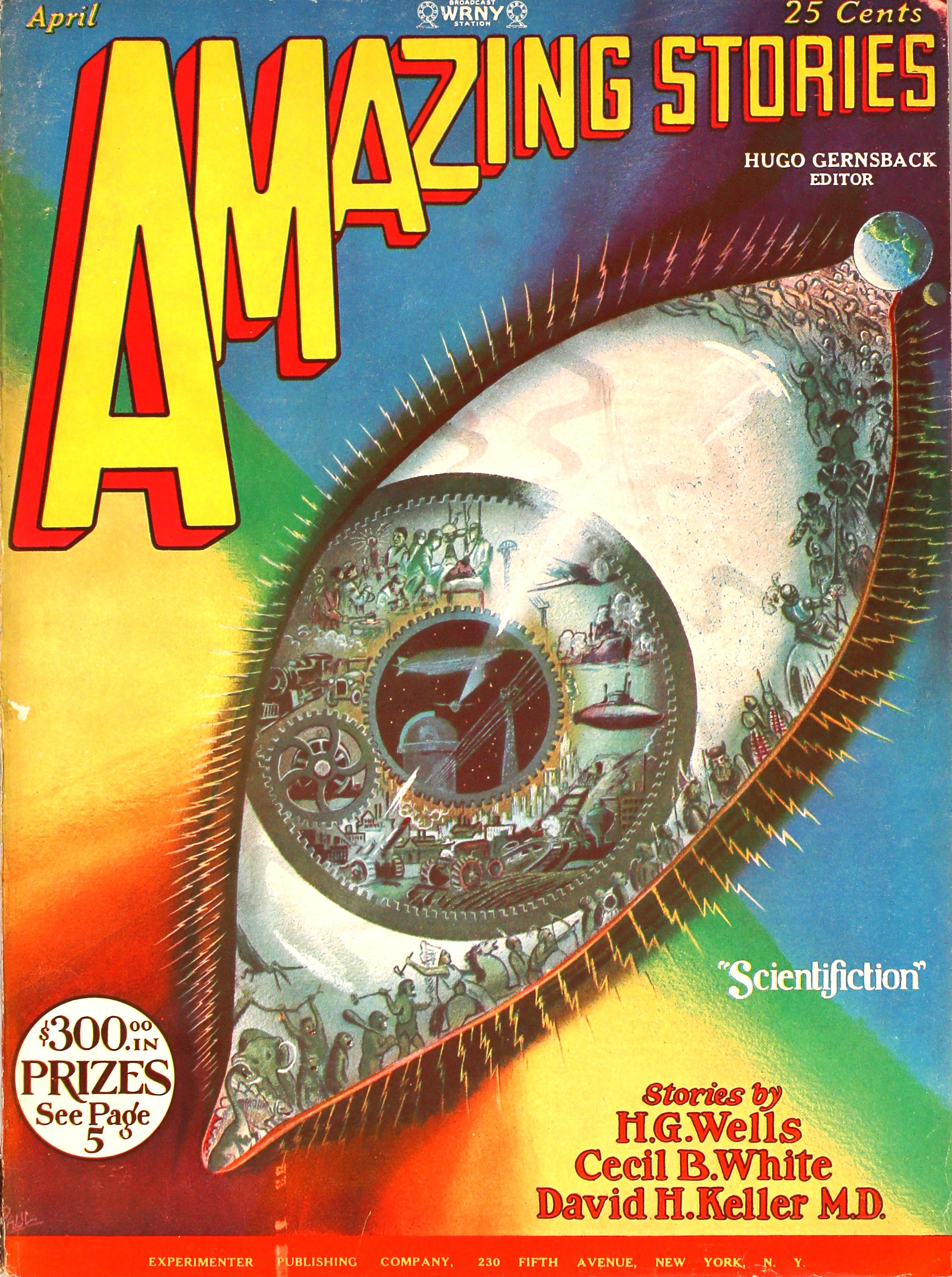
Cover of the April 1928 issue of Amazing Stories, which featured Clare Winger Harris's classic short story "The Miracle of the Lily."

Clare Winger Harris (January 18, 1891 – October 26, 1968) was an American science fiction writer whose short stories were published during the 1920s. She is credited as the first woman to publish stories under her own name in science fiction magazines. Harris began publishing stories in 1926 and soon became popular with readers, with most of her fiction appearing in the influential magazine Amazing Stories. She published a total of twelve stories, all but one of which were collected in 1947 as Away From the Here and Now; a full collection was not published until 2019 when The Artificial Man and Other Stories appeared. Her stories, which often feature strong female characters, have been reprinted in anthologies such as Library of America's The Future Is Female! 25 Classic Science Fiction Stories by Women and Wesleyan University Press's Sisters of Tomorrow: The First Women of Science Fiction.

== Life ==
Clare Winger was born on January 18, 1891, in Freeport, Illinois. Her father, Frank Stover Winger, was an electrical contractor who also wrote science fiction; in 1917, he published a novel called The Wizard of the Island; or, The Vindication of Prof. Waldinger. Her mother, May Stover, was the daughter of D. C. Stover, founder of the Stover Manufacturing and Engine Company and the richest man in Freeport. After their children were born and raised, Frank and May divorced.

Winger graduated in 1910 from Lake View High School in Chicago and attended Smith College without completing her degree. In 1912, she married Frank Clyde Harris. Her husband was an architect and engineer who later became president of the American Monorail Company of Cleveland, Ohio.

After marrying, Harris and her husband spent several years in Greece and Palestine, where Harris researched for her book Persephone of Eleusis: A Romance of Ancient Greece. Harris gave birth to three sons (Clyde Winger, born 1915; Donald Stover, born 1916; and Lynn Thackrey, born 1918) and lived in Manhattan, Kansas for a time, where her husband was an associate professor of architecture at Kansas State Agricultural College. She and her family later lived in Fairfield, Iowa but by 1927, the family had moved to Lakewood, Ohio. Her career as a writer spanned the years 1923 to 1933, during her tenures in these locations.

Harris ceased writing stories after 1933. She was still living in Lakewood in 1935, and according to an interview with her grandson, she and Frank "stayed together until their kids were fully grown." Clare and Frank's youngest son turned 18 in 1936, and by 1940, U.S. census records show Clare W. Harris as divorced and living in Pasadena, California, where she lived the rest of her life.

Harris died on October 26, 1968, in Pasadena. She lived alone and did not have much money, sometimes working as a switchboard operator to bring in extra income. However, a year before her death she inherited a quarter of her grandfather's estate valued at more than two million dollars. Her grandfather had died in 1908 but his inheritance was contested in the courts for nearly six decades.

== Writing career ==
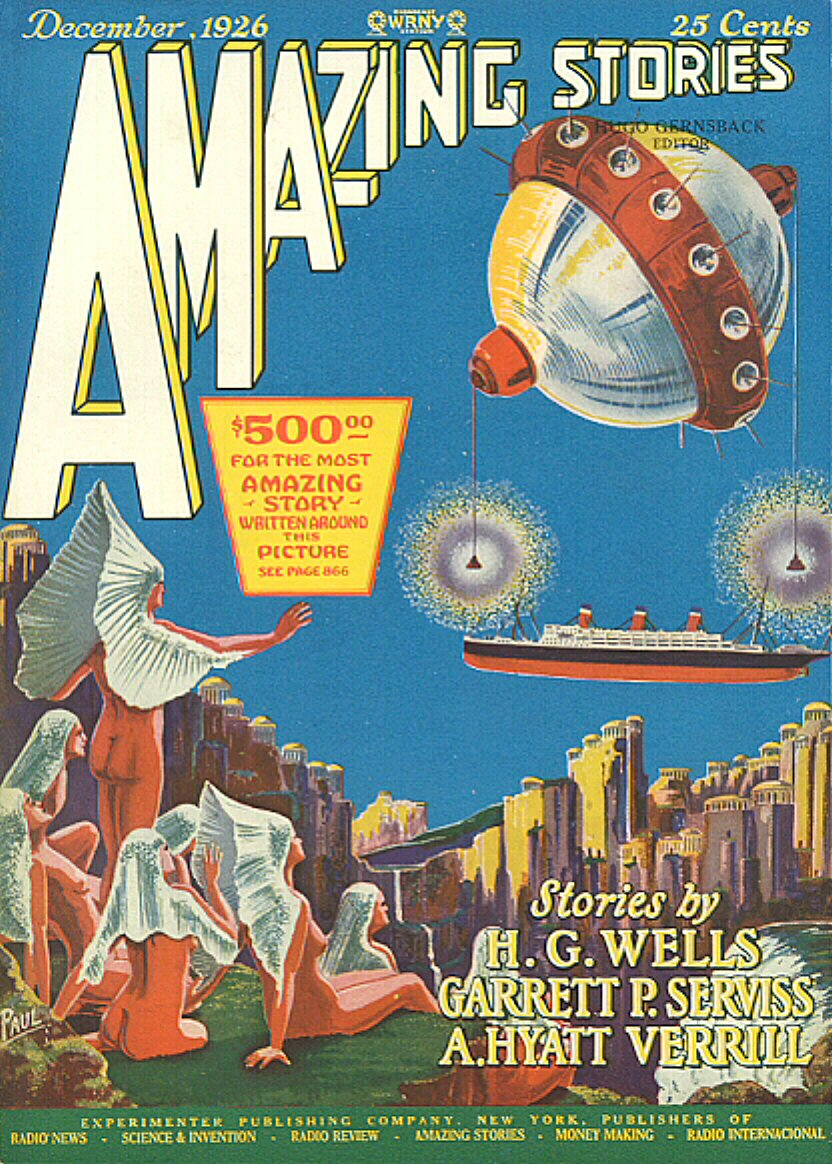
Cover of the December 1926 issue of Amazing Stories. Clare Winger Harris's short story “The Fate of the Poseidonia“ came third in a competition to write a story around this scene

Harris debuted as a writer in 1923 with a novel, a piece of historical fiction entitled Persephone of Eleusis: A Romance of Ancient Greece. The rest of her work would be very different, as it consisted entirely of short stories in the realm of science fiction.

Harris published her first short story, "A Runaway World," in the July 1926 issue of Weird Tales. In December of that year, she submitted a story for a contest being run by Amazing Stories editor Hugo Gernsback. Harris's story, "The Fate of the Poseidonia" (a space opera about Martians who steal Earth's water), placed third. She soon became one of Gernsback's most popular writers.

Harris eventually published 11 short stories in pulp magazines, most of them in Amazing Stories (although she also published one other story in Weird Tales and two in Science Wonder Quarterly, another Gernsback publication). She wrote her most acclaimed works during the 1920s; in 1930, she stopped writing to raise and educate her children. Her absence from the pulps was noted: a fan wrote in to Amazing Stories in late 1930 to ask, “What happened to Clare Winger Harris? I’ve missed her ...”. However, she did publish one story in 1933—titled "The Vibrometer," it appeared in a mimeographed pamphlet called Science Fiction. The editors, Jerry Siegel and Joe Shuster, were high school students in Cleveland at the time.

Harris self-published a collection of her stories titled Away from Here and Now: Stories in Pseudo-Science in 1947, which collected all of her short stories except "The Vibrometer". The collection received an award from the Los Angeles Science Fiction Society. In 2019, Belt Publishing released The Artificial Man and Other Stories, which collected all of her stories including "The Vibrometer."

Harris also wrote one of the first attempts to classify science fiction when, in the August 1931 issue of Wonder Stories, she listed 16 basic science fiction themes, including "interplanetary space travel," "adventures on other worlds," and "the creation of synthetic life."

Harris's writing has been described as being "fascinated by paradoxes of time, space travel, the possibility of inhabiting other worlds (in particular, the planet Mars), modern technology as it might be applied to humanity ... and how humanity might evolve or perhaps be supplanted by other species." Harris's writings often dealt with characters on the "borders of humanity" such as cyborgs and featured strong female characters who were equal to men, such as with the character of Sylvia, an airplane mechanic and pilot in her story "The Ape Cycle."

== Critical view and influence ==
Described as a "pioneering" science fiction author, Harris was the first female SF author to consistently write under her own name (Gertrude Barrows Bennett, who wrote under the pseudonym Francis Stevens, published a single science fiction story in 1904 using the name "G.M. Barrows"—her real name, although the use of initials disguised her gender. Her true identity was not revealed until 1952, four years after her death). Harris's stories appeared in the world's first science fiction magazine, Amazing Stories, less than a year after the magazine was founded. She was popular enough with fans of the time for "her name to be splashed on future covers to attract readers."

As Jane Donawerth wrote in Daughters of Earth: Feminist Science Fiction in the Twentieth Century, among the important aspects of Harris's contributions is that "she was a woman writer in a genre generally written by men, she wrote stories that included portraits of feminine strength, and she offered visions of a science that was not solely the province of privileged white men."

Even though Harris published only a handful of stories, almost all of them have been reprinted over the years. Of these, "The Miracle of the Lily" has been reprinted the most, appearing in anthologies such as The Future Is Female! 25 Classic Science Fiction Stories by Women, from Pulp Pioneers to Ursula K. Le Guin released by the Library of America in 2018 and Crawling Horror: Creeping Tales of the Insect Weird, released in 2021 by the British Library. The story has also been praised by many critics, with Forrest J Ackerman calling it a "classic" and Richard Lupoff saying it would have "won the Hugo Award for best short story, if the award had existed then." Lupoff also wrote that "[w]hile today's reader may find her prose creaky and old-fashioned, the stories positively teem with still-fresh and provocative ideas.

Harris's stories have also been reprinted in a number of other anthologies in recent decades, including two books from Wesleyan University Press: 2016's Sisters of Tomorrow: The First Women of Science Fiction and 2006's Daughters of Earth: Feminist Science Fiction in the 20th Century, with the later including a critical essay about Harris. Additional anthologies reprinting her work include Sci-Fi Womanthology, Amazing Science Fiction Anthology: The Wonder Years 1926-1935; and Gosh Wow! Sense of Wonder Science Fiction.

In 2018, her work was featured at the Pasadena History Museum as part of an exhibit titled "Dreaming the Universe: The Intersection of Science, Fiction, & Southern California."

== Bibliography ==
=== Novels ===
- Persephone of Eleusis: A Romance of Ancient Greece (The Stratford Company, Boston, 1923)

=== Collections ===
- Away from the Here and Now: Stories in Pseudo-Science (Philadelphia: Dorrance, 1947)
- The Artificial Man and Other Stories (Belt Publishing, February 2019, with an introduction by Brad Ricca)

=== Short stories ===
(Stories included in Away from the Here and Now).

- "A Runaway World" (Weird Tales, July 1926)
- "The Fate of the Poseidonia" (Amazing Stories, June 1927)
- "A Certain Soldier" (Weird Tales, November 1927)
- "The Fifth Dimension" (Amazing Stories, December 1928)
- "The Menace From Mars" (Amazing Stories, October 1928)
- "The Miracle of the Lily" (Amazing Stories, April 1928)
- "The Artificial Man" (Science Wonder Quarterly, Fall 1929)
- "A Baby on Neptune" with Miles J. Breuer, M.D. (Amazing Stories, December 1929)
- "The Diabolical Drug" (Amazing Stories, May 1929)
- "The Evolutionary Monstrosity" (Amazing Stories Quarterly, Winter 1929)
- "The Ape Cycle" (Science Wonder Quarterly, Spring 1930)

(Included in The Artificial Man and Other Stories).

- "The Vibrometer" (Science Fiction #5, 1933, edited by Jerry Siegel)

=== Essays ===
- Letter (Amazing Stories, May 1929): A Very Interesting Letter from One of Our Authors
- Letter (Air Wonder Stories, September 1929) [only as by Clare W. Harris]: On why Air Wonder Stories may not make a good venue for her fiction
- Letter (Weird Tales, March 1930): Expression of appreciation for the style of Henry de Vere Stacpoole's The Blue Lagoon (novel)
- Letter (Wonder Stories, August 1931): Possible Science Fiction Plots

== See also ==
- Women in science fiction
- Feminist science fiction
- Women science fiction authors
