= Wiscon =

Science fiction convention in Wisconsin, US

WisCon
- Genre: Feminist science fiction
- Dates: Memorial Day weekend
- Frequency: Annually
- Locations: Madison, Wisconsin
- Country: United States
- Inaugurated: 1977
- Participants: c. 1,000
- Organizer: (SF)3 -- http://www.sf3.org
- Website: www.wiscon.net

WisCon or Wiscon, a Wisconsin science fiction convention, is the oldest, and often called the world's leading, feminist science fiction convention and conference. It was first held in Madison, Wisconsin, in February 1977, after a group of fans attending the 1976 34th World Science Fiction Convention in Kansas City was inspired to organize a convention like WorldCon but with feminism as the dominant theme. The convention is held annually in May, during the four-day weekend of Memorial Day. Sponsored by the Society for the Furtherance and Study of Fantasy and Science Fiction, or (SF)^{3}, WisCon gathers together fans, writers, editors, publishers, scholars, and artists to discuss science fiction and fantasy, with emphasis on issues of feminism, gender, race, and class.

It was announced in 2023 that there would not be a 2024 Wiscon. The convention committee announced they would "take a year to rest, plan, and make adjustments that we don’t usually have time for during the rush of putting on this life-giving feminist speculative fiction convention."

The convention returned in 2025 and 2026 virtually, and plans to be in-person for a convention in 2027.

== Guests of honor ==
Since its inception, WisCon has invited one or more guests of honor to attend the convention every year, guiding and participating in programming and giving a speech at a ceremony in their honor. WisCon 30 (May 26–29, 2006) was an anniversary Wiscon, and 39 previous Guests of Honor attended. For WisCon 40, the convention invited a third guest of honor, Nalo Hopkinson, who was previously a guest of honor at WisCon 26. A virtual event happened on Memorial Day weekend in 2020 at WisCon XLIV. Here are the Guests of honor below:

WisCon #	Year	Guests of Honor
1	Feb. 11–13, 1977	Katherine MacLean, Amanda Bankier
2	Feb. 17–19, 1978	Vonda N. McIntyre, Susan Wood
3	Feb. 2–4, 1979	Suzy McKee Charnas, John Varley, Gina Clarke
4	March 7–9, 1980	Joan D. Vinge, Octavia Butler, David Hartwell, Beverly DeWeese
5	March 6–8, 1981	Chelsea Quinn Yarbro, Don & Elsie Wollheim, Buck & Juanita Coulson, Catherine McClenahan, Steven Vincent Johnson
6	March 5–7, 1982	Terry Carr, Suzette Haden Elgin
7	March 4–7, 1983	Marta Randall, Lee Killough
8	Feb. 24–26, 1984	Elizabeth A. Lynn, Jessica Amanda Salmonson
9	Feb. 22–24, 1985	Lisa Tuttle, Alicia Austin
10	Feb. 21–23, 1986	Chelsea Quinn Yarbro, Suzette Haden Elgin
11	Feb. 20–22, 1987	Connie Willis, Samuel R. Delany, Avedon Carol
12	Feb. 19–21, 1988	R. A. MacAvoy, George R. R. Martin, Stu Shiffman
13	Feb. 17–19, 1989	Gardner Dozois, Pat Cadigan
14	March 9–11, 1990	Iain M. Banks, Emma Bull
15	March 1–3, 1991	Pat Murphy, Pamela Sargent
16	March 6–7, 1992	Howard Waldrop, Trina Robbins
17	March 5–7, 1993	Kristine Kathryn Rusch, Lois McMaster Bujold
18	March 4–6, 1994	Karen Joy Fowler, Melinda Snodgrass, James Frenkel
19	May 26–29, 1995	Barbara Hambly, Sharyn McCrumb, Nicola Griffith
20	May 24–27, 1996	Ursula K. Le Guin, Judith Merril
21	May 23–26, 1997	Melissa Scott, Susanna Sturgis
22	May 22–25, 1998	Sheri S. Tepper, Delia Sherman, Ellen Kushner
23	May 28–31, 1999	Terri Windling, Mary Doria Russell
24	May 26–29, 2000	Charles de Lint, Jeanne Gomoll
25	May 25–28, 2001	Nancy Kress, Elisabeth Vonarburg
26	May 24–27, 2002	Nalo Hopkinson, Nina Kiriki Hoffman
27	May 23–26, 2003	Carol Emshwiller, China Miéville
28	May 28–31, 2004	Patricia McKillip, Eleanor Arnason
29	May 27–30, 2005	Gwyneth Jones, Robin McKinley
30	May 26–29, 2006	Kate Wilhelm, Jane Yolen
31	May 25–28, 2007	Kelly Link, Laurie Marks
32	May 23–26, 2008	L. Timmel Duchamp, Maureen McHugh
33	May 22–25, 2009	Ellen Klages, Geoff Ryman
34	May 28–31, 2010	Mary Anne Mohanraj, Nnedi Okorafor
35	May 26–30, 2011	Nisi Shawl
36	May 25–28, 2012	Andrea Hairston, Debbie Notkin
37	May 24–27, 2013	Joan Slonczewski, Jo Walton
38	May 23–26, 2014	Hiromi Goto, N. K. Jemisin
39	May 22–25, 2015	Alaya Dawn Johnson, Kim Stanley Robinson
40	May 27–30, 2016	Justine Larbalestier, Sofia Samatar, Nalo Hopkinson
41	May 26–29, 2017	Amal El-Mohtar, Kelly Sue DeConnick
42	May 25–28, 2018	Saladin Ahmed, Tananarive Due
43	May 24–27, 2019	G. Willow Wilson, Charlie Jane Anders
44	May 22–25, 2020	Rebecca Roanhorse, Yoon Ha Lee Traditional in-person convention cancelled due to COVID-19; converted to all-online format
No#	Online in 2021	Traditional in-person convention cancelled in 2021 due to COVID-19. No traditional guests named.
45	May 2022 online	Zen Cho (not attending), Yoon Ha Lee (not attending), Rebecca Roanhorse, Sheree Renée Thomas
46	May 26–29, 2023	Rivers Solomon, Martha Wells
47	May 23-26, 2025, online	Andrea Hairston, Naomi Kritzer
48	May 21-25, 2026, online	Darcie Little Badger, Premee Mohammed
49	May 27 to May 31, 2027	Annalee Newitz and Nicola Griffith

== Offshoot organizations and awards ==
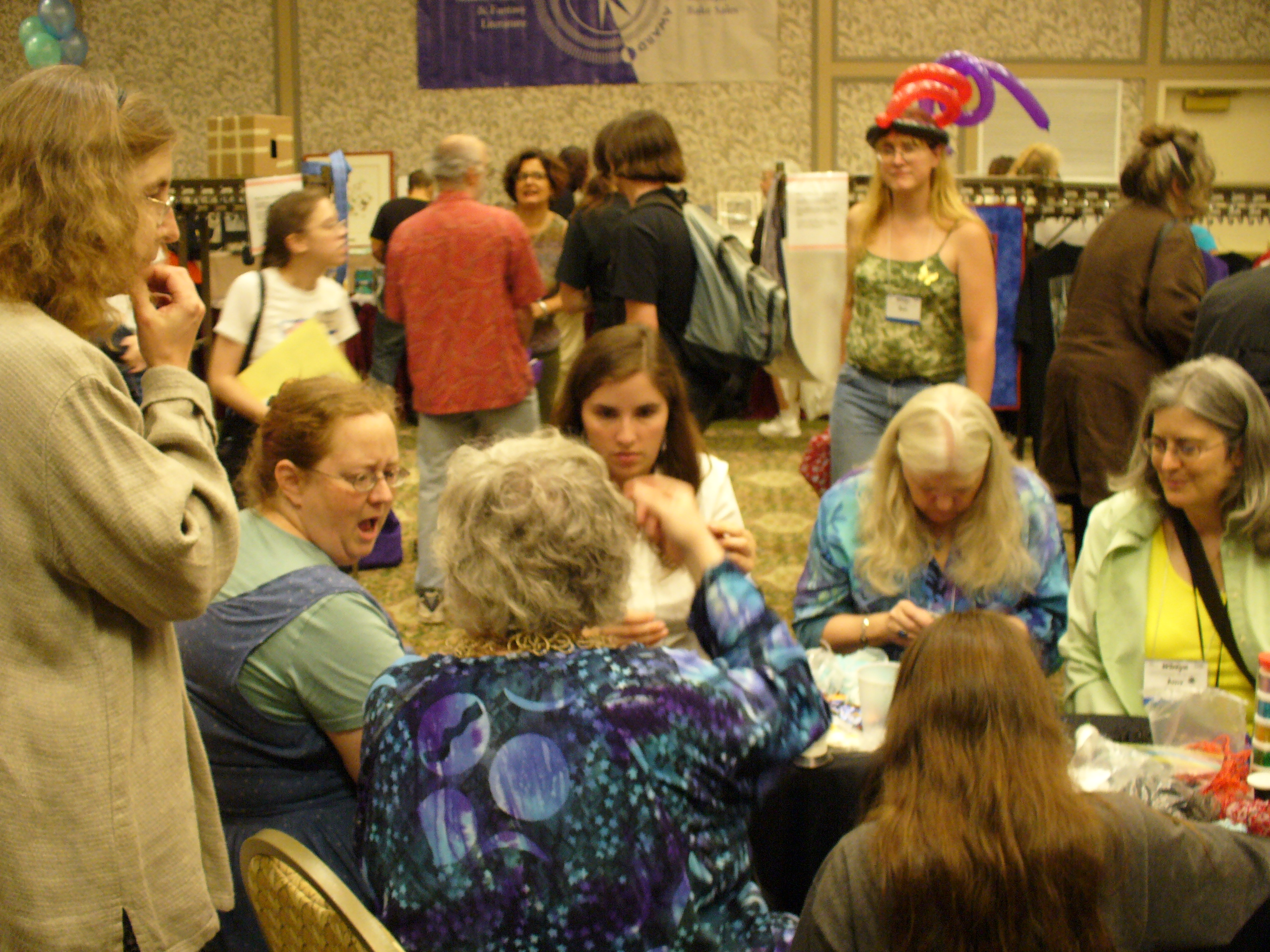
Beaders at Wiscon 2006. Lisa Freitag (far left), Kate Yule (next left), and Amy Thompson (far right).

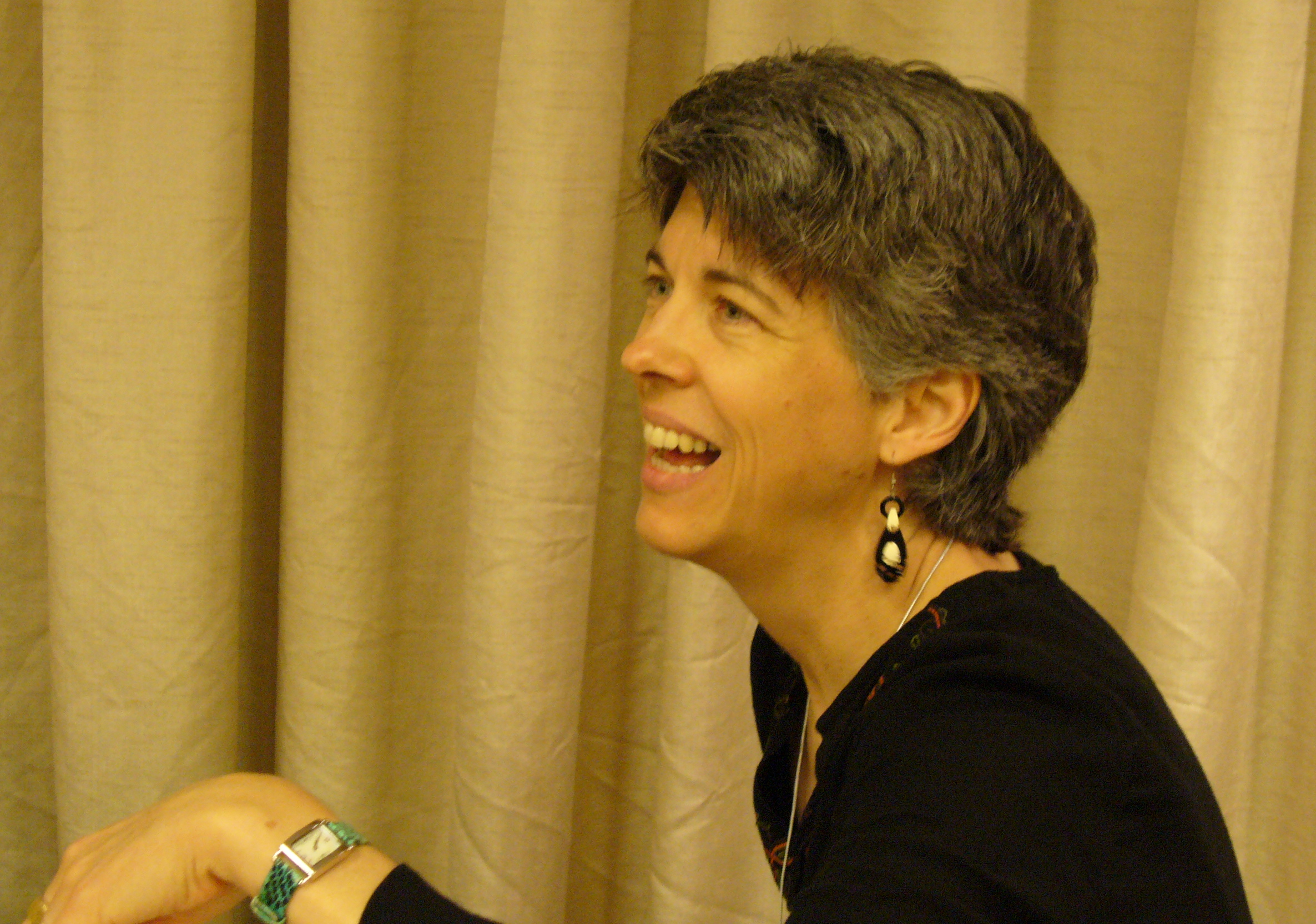
Emma Bull at Wiscon, 2006. Photo by Patrick Nielsen Hayden.

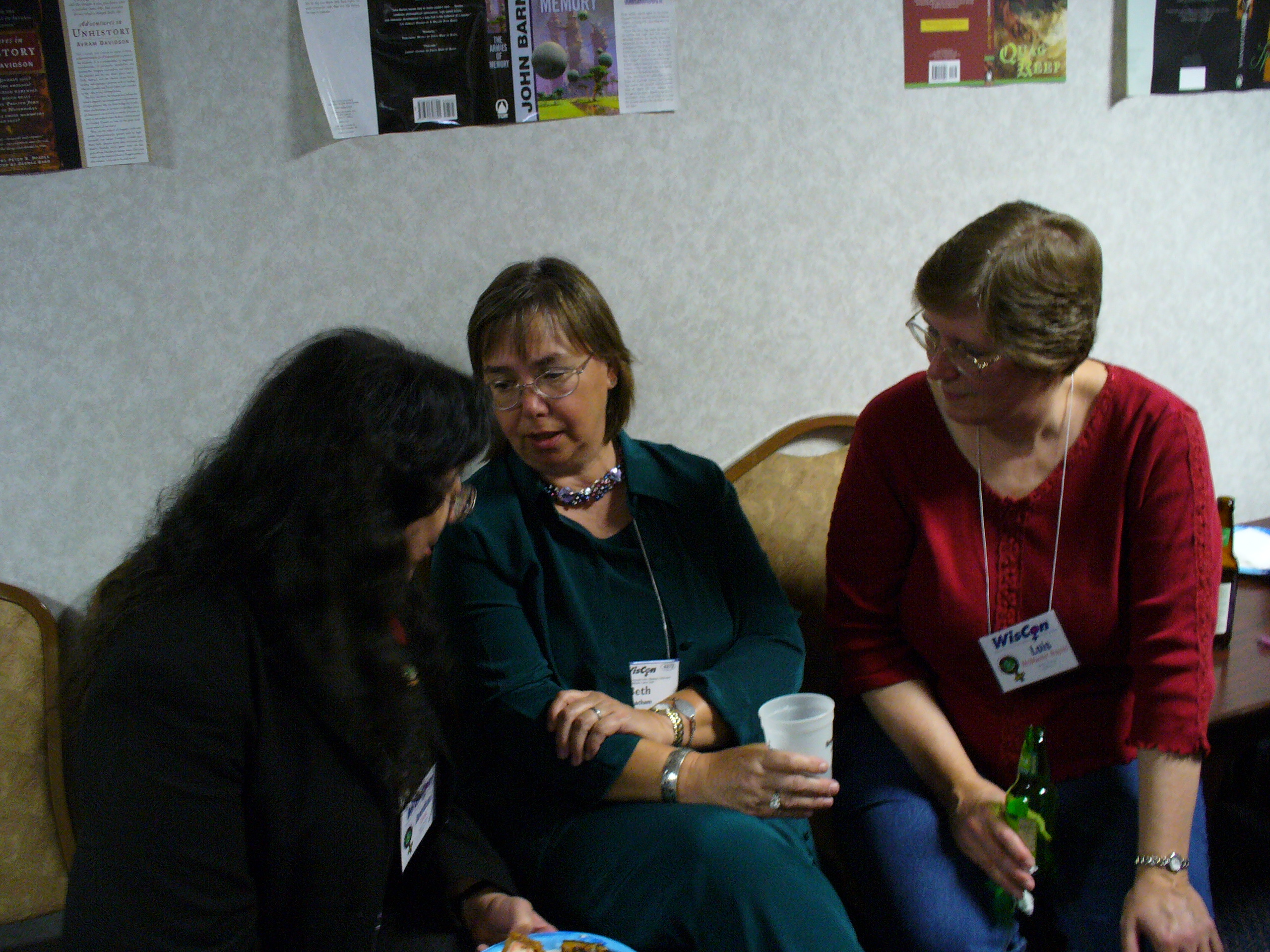
Avedon Carol, Beth Meacham, and Lois McMaster Bujold at Wiscon 30, 2006

Multiple awards and organizations have been created through or developed from conversations at WisCon that focus on various issues within science fiction and fantasy. Many of these offshoots still maintain close ties to WisCon, hosting parties or panel discussions focused on their areas of interest.

The James Tiptree, Jr. Award (now the Otherwise Award), an annual literary prize for science fiction or fantasy "that expands or explores our understanding of gender" was first discussed as part of Pat Murphy's Guest of Honor speech at WisCon 15 in 1991. The concept originated in a discussion at a prior WisCon, partly as "...a reaction to the fact that all of the science fiction awards were named after men. So they named the Tiptree for a man who was actually a woman". James Tiptree, Jr., was the pen name of Alice B. Sheldon. The Tiptree Ceremony has been held at other conventions, but is usually held at WisCon.

The Carl Brandon Society was founded in 1999 following discussions at Wiscon 23 about race, racism, and science and fantasy, inspired in part by Delany’s essay “Racism and Science Fiction” published in the New York Review of Science Fiction (August 1998). The organization is dedicated to addressing the representation of people of color in science fiction, fantasy and horror. In 2005 they created the Parallax Award, given to works of speculative fiction created by a self-identified person of color, and the Kindred Award, which is given to any work of speculative fiction dealing with issues of race and ethnicity; nominees may be of any racial or ethnic group.

Broad Universe, an organization with the primary goal of promoting science fiction, fantasy, and horror written by women, was first discussed at a panel discussion in 2000 at WisCon 24. It has since developed into a nonprofit with an online newsletter and other publications, a podcast, and a frequent presence at many conventions both to sell books written by members and to provide more information and help organize to support women writing, editing, and publishing in science fiction, fantasy, horror, and other speculative fiction.

== Books about WisCon ==
In 2007, Aqueduct Press began issuing a series of books titled "WisCon Chronicles", with The WisCon Chronicles: Vol. 1 ISBN 978-1-933500-14-0, edited by L. Timmel Duchamp. Volume 2 was The WisCon Chronicles: Volume 2: Provocative essays on feminism, race, revolution, and the future ISBN 978-1-933500-20-1, edited by Duchamp and Eileen Gunn; followed by The WisCon Chronicles: Vol. 3: The Carnival of Feminist SF ISBN 978-1-933500-30-0, edited by Liz Henry; The WisCon Chronicles: Vol. 4: Voices of WisCon ISBN 978-1-933500-40-9 edited by Sylvia Kelso; and The WisCon Chronicles: Volume 5: Writing and Racial Identity ISBN 978-1-933500-73-7, edited by Nisi Shawl and released at WisCon 35 (May 27–30, 2011), where Shawl was Guest of Honor. Volume 5, like Volume 4 before it, was supported by a grant from the Society for the Furtherance & Study of Fantasy & Science Fiction [(SF)^{3}]. The WisCon Chronicles 6: Futures of Feminism and Fandom ISBN 9781619760080, edited by Alexis Lothian, was issued at WisCon 36 in 2012; and The WisCon Chroncles 7: Shattering Ableist Narratives ISBN 9781619760424, edited by JoSelle Vanderhooft, was issued at WisCon 37 in late May 2013.

Helen Merrick's 2009 The Secret Feminist Cabal (ISBN 978-1-933500-33-1), a 2010 Hugo nominee, while a broader history of the topic, contains a number of mentions and descriptions of WisCon itself and of various WisCon-spawned projects such as the Tiptree Awards, Broad Universe, and the Carl Brandon Society, beginning with the author's preface and continuing throughout the book.

== See also ==
- Feminist science fiction
- Janus (science fiction magazine)
- The Witch and the Chameleon
- Women in speculative fiction

== Sources ==
- Bankier, Amanda, "Guest of Honor Speech at Wiscon 1"
- Gomoll, Jeanne, "Guest of Honor Speech at Wiscon 24"
- Gomoll, Jeanne, "An Open Letter to Joanna Russ", in Six Shooter (Jeanne Gomoll, Linda Pickersgill, and Pam Wells, eds.) - reprinted in Fanthology '87
- Hanson, Amy Axt, "How Is Wiscon Different from Other Cons?", The Broadsheet May 2002
- Marks, Laurie J., "Why, and How a Wallflower Throws a Party at Wiscon", The Broadsheet May 2002
- McClenahan, Catherine. "Wiscon, Then and Now." Wiscon 20 Souvenir Book, Madison: SF^{3}, 1996; pp. 46–48.
- Morgan, Cheryl, "Down Among the Rad Fems, 1998", The Broadsheet May 2002
- Merrick, Helen. "From Female Man to Feminist Fan: Uncovering 'Herstory' in the Annals of SF Fandom," in Women of Other Worlds: Excursions through Science Fiction and Feminism, edited by Helen Merrick and Tess Williams; Nedlands: University of Western Australia Press, 1999; pp. 115–139.
- Wiedenhoeft, John. "Klingons Not Focus of Wiscon The Science Fiction Convention Celebrates Literature and Feminism", The Capital Times May 26, 2006
