= Janus (science fiction magazine) =

American feminist science fiction fanzine (1975-80)

- 1977 cover
- Editor: Janice Bogstad; Jeanne Gomoll
- Categories: Feminist science fiction
- Founder: Janice Bogstad & Jeanne Gomoll
- Founded: 1975
- First issue: December 1975
- Final issue Number: Winter 1980; 18
- Country: USA
- Based in: Madison, Wisconsin
- ISSN: 0197-775X

Janus was a feminist science fiction fanzine edited by Janice Bogstad and Jeanne Gomoll in Madison, Wisconsin, and closely associated with that city's science fiction convention, WisCon (several early WisCon program books doubled as special issues of Janus). It was repeatedly nominated for the Hugo Award for Best Fanzine (1978, 1979 and 1980); this led to accusations that if Janus had not been feminist, it wouldn't have been nominated. Eighteen issues were published under this name from 1975 to 1980; it was succeeded by Aurora SF (Aurora Speculative Feminism).

== Contributors ==
During its run, Janus included articles, reviews, artwork and/or letters of comment from a variety of notables, including: Amanda Bankier, Marion Zimmer Bradley, Walter Breen, Linda Bushyager, Avedon Carol, Suzy McKee Charnas, C. J. Cherryh, Buck Coulson, Samuel R. Delany, Gene DeWeese, Harlan Ellison, Alexis Gilliland, Mike Glicksohn, Joan Hanke-Woods, Teddy Harvia (both as Harvia and under his real name of David Thayer), Ursula K. Le Guin, Elizabeth Lynn, Loren MacGregor, Katherine Maclean, Vonda McIntyre, Alexei Panshin, Andy Porter, William Rotsler, Joanna Russ, Jessica Amanda Salmonson, Charles R. Saunders, Stu Shiffman, Gene Simmons, Wilson "Bob" Tucker, Joan Vinge, Harry Warner Jr., F. Paul Wilson, Donald A. Wollheim, and Susan Wood.

== See also ==
- Feminist science fiction
- The Witch and the Chameleon
- Women in speculative fiction
