= Twilight Zone: 19 Original Stories on the 50th Anniversary =

Short story collection edited by Carol Serling

Twilight Zone 19 Original Stories on the 50th Anniversary
- Author: Carol Serling (ed.)
- Subject: The Twilight Zone
- Genre: Fiction, anthology
- Publisher: Tor Books
- Publication date: September 2009
- Media type: Print
- Pages: 448
- ISBN: 978-0-7653-2433-7
- OCLC: 316058888

Twilight Zone: 19 Original Stories on the 50th Anniversary is an anthology of short stories written by various authors and edited by Carol Serling, the widow of series creator Rod Serling. Each story was written with themes or styles similar to The Twilight Zone episodes, including a narrated introduction and conclusion. Authors who contributed stories include Twilight Zone veterans Earl Hamner Jr., Alan Brennert, William F. Wu, and Rod Serling. Reviewers listed some of the better stories as being Kelley Armstrong's "A Haunted House of Her Own", Alan Brennert's "Puowaina" and Mike Resnick and Lezli Robyn's "Benchwarmer".

== Background ==
This anthology of short stories was published to mark the fiftieth anniversary of the television debut of The Twilight Zone. Since the death of her husband, The Twilight Zone creator Rod Serling, Carol Serling had been acting as a consultant for a series of fiction anthologies and for the 1983 theatrical film. She contributed to or edited books including Journeys to the Twilight Zone, Adventures in the Twilight Zone, Return to the Twilight Zone, More Stories from the Twilight Zone, and the non-fiction book Rod Serling and The Twilight Zone: The 50th Anniversary Tribute. Among the authors solicited to write stories for the 50th anniversary book were Alan Brennert and William F. Wu, who worked on the 1980s The Twilight Zone series; Earl Hamner Jr., who wrote episodes for the original series; and Rod Serling's older brother, Robert J. Serling. Peter S. Beagle and Harlan Ellison were advertised as contributors but their stories did not make it into the book.

== Synopsis and format ==
The book begins with an introduction by the editor Carol Serling and ends with brief biographies of all the authors. Each of the 19 self-contained short stories includes an introduction and conclusion with the same tone and style as Rod Serling's narration at the beginning and end of each Twilight Zone episode.

Adam Balm on Ain't It Cool News categorized the short stories into the following four basic types of The Twilight Zone episode formats: the social revenge fantasies ("The Art of Miniature", "Family Man", and "The Good Neighbor") use unlikable characters who eventually suffer an ironic twist to their predicament; stories about paranoid characters trying to convince others that something is wrong ("The Street that Forgot Time"); stories with a war theme ("Genesis", "Puowaina", "Ghost Writer", and "The Soldier He Needed to Be"); and stories centered on a hitch-hiker ("On the Road" and "Truth or Consequences").

=== Segments ===
Title	Author	Synopsis
Genesis	David Hagberg	During World War II, an American platoon is under attack by the Japanese in the Philippines. As they strive to overtake the enemy position, one member of the platoon periodically suffers delusions that show him events in alternate times and places.
A Haunted House of Her Own	Kelley Armstrong	A woman purchases a country inn to market as a haunted house to tourists. Though she does not initially believe in ghosts, a series of odd events and her husband acting possessed makes her re-examine her beliefs.
On the Road	William F. Wu	In 1970, two hitchhikers meet by chance and promise each other to pursue their desired career paths. In the present, they unexpectedly meet again in a cafe in Texas, fulfilling a promise to meet again when one of them needs the other's help.
The Art of the Miniature	Earl Hamner	A man obsessed with bonsai takes revenge on his pool cleaner whom he suspects is damaging his prized plants.
Benchwarmer	Mike Resnick & Lezli Robyn	An imaginary friend waits to play with his real-life friend.
Truth or Consequences	Carole Nelson Douglas	While traveling to Truth or Consequences, New Mexico, a retired librarian becomes paranoid about a hitchhiker who seems to keep ahead of her.
Puowaina	Alan Brennert	A school girl in Hawaii foresees events including her father's death and a surprise attack on Pearl Harbor.
Torn Away	Joe R. Lansdale	A man separated from his shadow by a witch is detained by police. The man convinces the police chief to help him flee his shadow just before it attacks.
Vampin' Down the Avenue	Timothy Zahn	An actor frustrated by the paparazzi starts taking drugs that make him invisible to cameras at night. When he forgets to take the antidote before dawn, he suffers a day that ruins his career.
A Chance of a Ghost	Lucia St. Clair Robson	A woman buys a supposedly haunted walking stick on eBay. The woman and the cane become friends and they fight off a collector seeking to acquire the cane.
The Street that Forgot Time	Deborah Chester	The adoption of a stray dog breaks a workaholic's routine and leads him to notice that everyone in his gated community is stuck in their own routines. He escapes after discovering that someone is controlling the residents through subliminal messages on their televisions and computers.
The Wrong Room	R. L. Stine	A salesman checks into a hotel to attend a convention. After attending the wrong convention and being dismayed by the staff's ambivalence about not being able to leave the hotel or contact the outside world, the salesman believes he has died and is now in Hell.
Ghost Writer	Robert J. Serling	The President of the United States and his speechwriter discuss the tone and substance of an upcoming speech regarding the future of a divisive war.
The Soldier He Needed to Be	Jim DeFelice	An American soldier in Afghanistan attributes his positive change in luck and combat effectiveness to a new iPod. He becomes so reliant on the good luck charm that their fates become intertwined.
Ants	Tad Williams	An abusive husband kills his wife with an axe. After he cleans away the body, he uses ants which have infested their house to track down left over pieces he missed.
Your Last Breath, Inc.	John Miller	A reporter refuses to accept the explanation of what a new business offers and struggles to uncover a rational explanation he can accept.
Family Man	Laura Lippman	A manager uses family obligations as a shield against criticism for toeing the corporate line and being disloyal to his staff. His world is turned upside down when he awakens to find no trace of his family ever having existed.
The Good Neighbor	Whitley Strieber	A homeowner fights blockbusting by burning down the house of his new neighbor, but mistakenly kills some of the occupants.
El Moe	Rod Serling	A corrupt drifter is mistaken for a legendary Mexican folk hero who battled the Federales and must decide whether to become the legend or sell out to the Federales.

== Publication and reception ==
The book was published by Tor Books as a hardcover and paperback in September 2009. To help with its promotion a 39-second video trailer was produced. Compared to Rod Serling and The Twilight Zone: The 50th Anniversary Tribute, which was reviewed by writer Elizabeth Hand as "a piece of hagiography that does little to illuminate Serling's genius or the enduring appeal of his most famous creation", the anthology was called "a far superior homage to Serling". In her Magazine of Fantasy and Science Fiction column Hand listed Hagberg's "Genesis" as the best story in the anthology though Lansdale and Stine's are also good. She called Rod Serling and Strieber's stories "the only real misfires".

The review in Publishers Weekly listed Armstrong's "A Haunted House of Her Own", Brennert's "Puowaina", and Tad Williams's "Ants" as the best stories. The review also listed Wu's "On the Road", Douglas's "Truth or Consequences", and Robert Serling's "Ghost Writer" as being "less satisfying" stories. The review concluded that the book is "largely inoffensive and faithful to the Twilight Zone format, this anthology is primarily of interest to hardcore fans". Carl Hays from Booklist wrote a positive review, saying "superior craftsmanship ensures can't-miss entertainment for speculative-fiction fans and anyone nostalgic for the original Twilight Zone aura". Impressed by the authors, the reviewer in the Library Journal wrote "with this slate of authors and the perennial popularity of the show, all libraries should own a copy".

The Starlog reviewer, David McDonnell, lists the anthology's best stories as Lansdale's "Torn Away", Zahn's "Vampin' Down the Avenue", Resnick and Robyn's "Benchwarmer", and Armstrong's "A Haunted House of Her Own". McDonnell noted that Rod Serling's "El Moe" was least like a typical Twilight Zone story, and that Williams's "Ants" belonged to the Alfred Hitchcock Presents universe rather than The Twilight Zone. On Ain't It Cool News, Adam Balm identified Wu's "On the Road" as "the best entry in the collection". Balm wrote that the anthology is "uneven, with too many stories disappointing and too many that are nostalgianautic remember-whens, mining territory long since tamed and settled by others" but ultimately worth the money spent.
