= The Monitor, the Miners, and the Shree =

1980 novel by Lee Killoug

- Cover of first edition
- Editor: Lee Killough
- Cover artist: Wayne Barlowe
- Language: English
- Genre: Science fiction
- Publisher: Del Rey Books
- Publication date: 1980
- Publication place: United States
- Media type: Print (paperback)
- Pages: 215
- ISBN: 0-345-28456-9

The Monitor, the Miners, and the Shree is a science fiction novel by Lee Killough, first published in paperback by Del Rey Books in April 1980.

== Plot summary ==
The Monitor, the Miners, and the Shree is a novel in which a sociological expedition is conducted on the planet of Nira regarding the culture of the Shree who live there.

== Reception ==
Greg Costikyan in Ares Magazine #3 commented that the book "is a well-crafted adventure story, of the sort Poul Anderson used to write, and is well worth reading."

== Reviews ==
- Dean R. Lambe in Science Fiction Review, August 1980
- John Clute in The Magazine of Fantasy & Science Fiction, December 1980
- Allan Magnus (1980) in Megavore 12, Dec. 1, 1980.
- Kliatt
