= Alison Assiter =

British activist, born 1949

Alison Assiter FRSA FAcSS
- Born: 23 October 1949 (age 77)

Academic background
- Education: Bristol University; Somerville College, Oxford; University of Sussex
- Thesis: The limits of Althusserianism (1984)

Academic work
- Institutions: University of the West of England; London School of Economics
- Main interests: Feminist philosophy, feminist theory, political philosophy
- Notable works: Kierkegaard, Eve and Metaphors of Birth

Alison Assiter FRSA, FAcSS (born 23 October 1949), is a British academic who is Professor of Feminist Theory at the University of the West of England.

== Education ==
Assiter gained her degree from Bristol University, her B.Phil. from Somerville College, Oxford, and her D.Phil. from Sussex University in 1984.

== Career ==
In the early 2000s, Assiter was the dean of the Faculty of Economics and Social Science at UWE Bristol, and the London School of Economics visiting professor of sociology in January 2006.

Assiter's book Kierkegaard, Eve and Metaphors of Birth was described as "an important contribution to the general subject matter of realizable well-being" and "illuminating and thought-provoking". It has also been reviewed by Times Higher Education.

== Bibliography ==
- Assiter, Alison (1989). Pornography, feminism, and the individual. London Winchester, Mass: Pluto Press. ISBN 9780745303192.
- Assiter, Alison (1990). Althusser and feminism. London Winchester, Mass: Pluto Press. ISBN 9780745302942.
- Assiter, Alison; Shaw, Eileen (1993). Using records of achievement in higher education. London Philadelphia: Kogan Page. ISBN 9780749411114.
- Assiter, Alison; Carol, Avedon (1993). Bad girls and dirty pictures: the challenge to reclaim feminism. London Boulder, Colo: Pluto Press. ISBN 9780745305240.
- Assiter, Alison (1995). Transferable skills in higher education. London Philadelphia: Kogan Page. ISBN 9780749415501.
- Assiter, Alison (1996). Enlightened women modernist feminism in a postmodern age. London New York: Routledge. ISBN 9780415083386.
- Assiter, Alison (2003). Revisiting universalism. Houndmills, Basingstoke, Hampshire New York: Palgrave Macmillan. ISBN 9780333984529.
- Assiter, Alison (2009). Kierkegaard, metaphysics and political theory unfinished selves. London New York: Continuum International Publishing Group. ISBN 9780826498311.
- Assiter, Alison; Tonon, Margherita (2012). Kierkegaard and the political. Newcastle upon Tyne: Cambridge Scholars Pub. ISBN 9781443840613.
- Assiter, Alison (2015). Kierkegaard, Eve, and metaphors of birth. London New York: Rowman & Littlefield International. ISBN 9781783483259.

== See also ==
- Louis Althusser
- Avedon Carol
- Immanuel Kant
- Søren Kierkegaard
- Socrates
- Code Pink
