= ApolloCon =

Science fiction convention held annually in Houston, Texas

- Status: Defunct
- Genre: Science fiction
- Locations: Houston, Texas
- Country: United States
- Inaugurated: 2004
- Attendance: ~450 (2012)
- Organizer: Houston Science Fiction Association
- Filing status: 501(c)3
- Website: http://www.apollocon.org/

ApolloCon was a science fiction convention held annually in Houston, Texas by the Houston Science Fiction Association (HSFA), a non-profit 501(c)3 corporation.

ApolloCon offers information and entertainment for fans of science fiction, fantasy, horror, and other genres of speculative and imaginative fiction in all their forms, including literary, media, and interactive gaming.

== Programming ==
ApolloCon offers discussion panels on literary, media, science and culture topics. These include several discussions that focus on space exploration and astronomy, drawing participants from Houston's space sciences industries and other groups.

In addition to its discussion panels, ApolloCon hosts an exhibition hall for vendors of books and other merchandise, an art show and auction, a full schedule of LARP, gaming, filk music, video programming, a judged masquerade, plus networking opportunities for clubs and individual fans. Guests are typically writers and editors, artists, scientists, musicians, actors, and fans in the fields of science fiction, fantasy, and horror.

== Past conventions ==
- 2004 (June 25–26)
  - Guest of Honor: Selina Rosen
  - Artist Guest of Honor: Cat Osborne
  - Science Guests of Honor: Paul Abell and Bonnie Cooper
  - Convention chair: Doug Herrington
- 2005 (June 24–26)
  - Guest of Honor: Robert J. Sawyer
  - Artist Guest of Honor: Victory
  - Filk Guest of Honor: Juanita Coulson
  - Fan Guests of Honor: Kathy Thornton and Derly N. Ramirez II
  - Convention chair: Doug Herrington
- 2006 (June 23–25)
  - Guest of Honor: Peter S. Beagle
  - Artist Guest of Honor: Alain Viesca
  - Filk Guest of Honor: Steve Macdonald
  - Fan Guest of Honor: Tim Miller
  - Special Guest: Greg Edmonson
  - Special Guest: David Franklin
  - Convention chair: Mark Hall
- 2007 (June 22–24)
  - Guest of Honor: C.S. Friedman
  - Editor Guest of Honor: David G. Hartwell
  - Artist Guest of Honor: Jeff Sturgeon
  - Filk Guests of Honor: Graham and Becca Leathers
  - Fan Guest of Honor: A.T. Campbell, III
  - Convention chair: Mark Hall
- 2008 (June 27–29)
  - Guest of Honor: Allen Steele
  - Editor Guest of Honor: Lou Anders
  - Artist Guest of Honor: Brad Foster
  - Filk Guest of Honor: Margaret Middleton
  - Fan Guest of Honor: Anne KG Murphy
  - Convention chair: Shai Mohammed
- 2009 (June 26–28)
  - Guest of Honor: Wil McCarthy
  - Editor Guest of Honor: (unable to attend)
  - Artist Guest of Honor: Pat Rawlings
  - Music Guest of Honor: Amy McNally
  - Fan Guest of Honor: Al Jackson
  - Special Guest: Stanley G. Love
  - Convention chair: Kim Kofmel
- 2010 (June 25–27)
  - Guest of Honor: Catherine Asaro
  - Artist Guest of Honor: Keith Thompson
  - Fan Guest of Honor: Pat Virzi
  - Music Guest of Honor: Dave Weingart
  - Special Guest: Rob Balder of Erfworld
  - Convention chair: Kim Kofmel
- 2011 (June 24–26)
  - Guest of Honor: Martha Wells
  - Artist Guest of Honor: [Rocky Kelley ]
  - Editor Guest of Honor: Ann VanderMeer
  - Fan Guest of Honor: Jeanne Gomoll
  - Convention chair: Katy Pace
- 2012 (June 22–24)
  - Guest of Honor: Tanya Huff
  - Artist Guest of Honor: Jael
  - Fan Guest of Honor: Candace Pulleine (in memoriam)
  - Convention Chair: Jonathan Guthrie

== Community participation ==
ApolloCon is largely conducted by and for local fan based communities which are in turn interwoven with each other. The motto "We are them and they are us" is often used to describe the inter-relationship. Notable organizations that have participated in past ApolloCons include Artist Trading Cards, Bayou City Browncoats, Houston Costume Group, Houston Sci-Fi Video, Houston SF & Fantasy Writers, Houston SF Book Exchange Network, Houston SF Ritual Breakfast, Inklings Roundtable of Houston, Several Unlimited, SF Writers Meetup, South Texas Squad of the 501st Legion, Space City Trade Federation, Star Trek Houston, Starbase Houston, USS Firebird NCC-74919, and USS SpiritWolf NCC-74300.
