= Earth 2 (TV series) =

American television series

- Genre: Science fiction; Action; Adventure fiction
- Created by: Billy Ray; Michael Duggan; Carol Flint; Mark Levin
- Starring: Debrah Farentino; Joey Zimmerman; Clancy Brown; J. Madison Wright; Sullivan Walker; Jessica Steen; Rebecca Gayheart; John Gegenhuber; Antonio Sabàto, Jr.
- Music by: David Bergeaud
- Country of origin: United States
- Original language: English
- No. of seasons: 1
- No. of episodes: 21

Production
- Executive producers: Michael Duggan; Mark Levin; Carol Flint
- Producers: Cleve Landsberg; Chip Masamitsu; Janace Tashjian; Tony To
- Running time: 45 minutes
- Production companies: Amblin Television; Universal Television

Original release
- Network: NBC
- Release: November 6, 1994 – June 4, 1995

Earth 2 is an American science fiction television series that aired on NBC from November 6, 1994, to June 4, 1995. The show was canceled after one season of 21 episodes. It follows the journey and settlement of a small expeditionary group called the Eden Project, with the intent to journey to an Earth-like planet called G889 in an attempt to find a cure to an illness called "the syndrome". The series was created by Billy Ray, Michael Duggan, Carol Flint, and Mark Levin, produced by Amblin Entertainment and Universal Television, and filmed primarily in northern New Mexico around the Santa Fe area. The series' music was composed by David Bergeaud, and the executive producers were Duggan, Levin, and Flint.

The show had a successful premiere, reaching eighth place for the week; however, ratings dropped off quickly as the Nielsen ratings share had dropped from 23% to 9%. During its run, it had been nominated for a Primetime Emmy, Saturn, and other awards. In 2005, the entire series was released on DVD in a four-disc set.

== Plot ==
In 2192, most of the human population has fled Earth to live on large orbiting space stations. Only a small number of humans remain on the Earth's surface, as the planet has become mostly uninhabitable.

Billionaire Devon Adair's eight-year-old son, Ulysses Adair, has contracted a rare, fatal condition called "the syndrome," a condition whose existence is acknowledged by neither the government nor the medical community. It is theorized that this disease, which affects only children, is somehow caused by the lack of an Earth-like environment. Most children born with the disease do not live past the age of nine.

Desperate to save her son, Adair organizes a group to pioneer the settlement of a planet 22 light-years away from Earth, where other afflicted families can also relocate. The eventual colonization of the planet, however, is opposed by the government. Secret surveillance and agent infiltration threaten the establishment of the colony, New Pacifica. Hours before Adair's group is scheduled to depart, a bomb is discovered, set to detonate at the exact hour of departure. The Eden Project launches immediately, successfully jettisoning the bomb before detonation. In "The Church of Morgan", it is revealed that this bomb was planted by the Council to prevent the ship from leaving.

Twenty-two years later, the ship arrives at G889, but it crash-lands far from the planned landing site. With her group scattered across the terrain and supplies missing, Adair marshals the survivors she can find and begins heading west toward the planned site of New Pacifica.

During their journey, Adair and her companions gradually learn to cope with life on the alien world. Although the planet initially appears superficially Earth-like, it is soon revealed to possess a vastly different ecology. Among its inhabitants are two native, sentient humanoid species: the "Grendlers" — a short, stout race of hunter-gatherers prone to kleptomania — and the "Terrians" — a taller, lankier species capable of telepathy and earth-shaping abilities, whose very survival is linked to the planet itself.

At the same time, the survivors learn that the Council — the governing body dominating the space stations — intends to seize G889 for resettlement. Through clandestine experiments, the Council has determined that eradicating the Terrians would render the planet uninhabitable.

This creates a dangerous complication for Devon Adair. Having been healed by the Terrians and adopting some of their psychic traits, her young son Ulysses becomes the linchpin of the Council's ultimate plan for G889.

== Cast ==
=== Main ===
- Debrah Farentino as Devon Adair
- Joey Zimmerman as Ulysses Adair
- Clancy Brown as John Danziger
- J. Madison Wright as True Danziger
- Sullivan Walker as Yale
- Jessica Steen as Dr. Julia Heller
- Rebecca Gayheart as Bess Martin
- John Gegenhuber as Morgan Martin
- Antonio Sabàto, Jr. as Alonzo Solace

=== Recurring and guest stars ===
- Richard Bradford as Commander Broderick O'Neill
- Terry O'Quinn as Reilly
- Tim Curry as Gaal
- Jeff Kober as Z.E.D.
- Rockmond Dunbar as Baines
- Roy Dotrice as The Elder
- Virginia Madsen as Alonzo Solace's Dance Partner
- Kelli Williams as Mary
- Walter Norman as Walman
- Marcia Magus as Magus
- Tierre Turner as Zero
- Kirk Trutner as Cameron

== Characters ==
The interactions among the original crew, the convicts, the government and the local aliens and their planet forms the basis of many of the story's plot lines, as the colonists learn more about their new home while trying to avoid detection by the Council.

Devon Adair
The leader of the expedition whose own son is afflicted with the Syndrome. As the leader, she attempts to balance directing the group as obstacles are encountered while confronting the possibility that her son may not survive his sickness.
Ulysses Adair
Nicknamed "Uly", he is the eight-year-old son of the expedition's leader, Devon Adair. He was born with the Syndrome, an illness which convinced his mother that he could be cured if raised on a planet with access to fresh air, clean water and sunshine. His arrival on G889 and eventual connection to the Terrians is one of the keys to the colonization of the world and a recurring plot theme.
John Danziger
Previously an indentured worker aboard the space station from which the group leaves. His daughter is most important to him, but he also assumes the role of protector of the group.
True Danziger
The ten-year-old daughter of John Danziger, and also previously an indentured worker on the space station from which the expedition departed. She forms a bond with Uly, initially one of jealousy and dislike, but eventually a close friendship.
Yale
A former convict and cyborg whose memory has been erased and behavior altered under a government program for the purpose of becoming a tutor for the children of wealthy families. He later recovers some of his memories and learns he did not commit a violent crime but instead defied the Council.
Dr. Julia Heller
A genetically modified junior physician the colonists later learn is an agent for the Council.
Morgan Martin
A government official supervising the Eden Project, husband to Bess Martin.
Bess Martin
Wife of Morgan Martin, who grew up in the mines of Earth.
Alonzo Solace
A cold sleep pilot far older than he looks, and eventually a love interest of Dr. Heller.
Reilly
Julia Heller's contact on the council, who eventually is revealed to be a computer program. In "All About Eve", the creator of the EVE program reveals that Reilly is part of the same program.
Zero
The crew's bipedal worker droid capable of multiple tasks.
Commander Broderick O’Neill
Second in command, he is stung by a Koba which puts him into a coma that the colonists mistake for death. He is found, but is suspicious of Gaal and begins hunting for clues to his history. He is murdered by Grendlers at the end of the second episode.

== Life on G889 ==
The landscape and climate of the new planet where the ship crashed seems very much like that of harsher climates on Earth, such as the southwestern United States. Water is scarce and scrub grows out of rock formations. In this area, three different species of life are discovered by Devon Adair and her group.

Grendlers
Soon after arrival the colonists come into contact with a semi-intelligent race of traders and scavengers named Grendlers. In "A Memory Play", it is revealed that a grendler's saliva is a cure for virtually any disease.
Terrians
Exploring further, the group encounters an intelligent subterranean indigenous species named the Terrians, who seem to have a symbiotic relationship with the planet and can only communicate with the colonists through a dreamscape that few of them understand.
Kobas
Small monkey-like creatures with a leather-like skin and large eyes. Kobas possess sharp claws, which they use like darts to incapacitate their intended food source. Once struck by a Koba-claw, a victim falls into a near-death coma for two to three days, but awakens with no permanent damage. Kobas have a great talent for mimicry. They are friendly toward those who are friendly to them, but are quick to defend themselves against possible predators.
Humans
During the series the colonists learn they are not the only humans on the planet; it had previously been used as a penal colony so the government could learn more about how to colonize the planet.

== Production ==
=== Notable aspects of the series ===
Initially the series was intended to premiere on September 18, 1994 to accompany the season two premiere of fellow Amblin Television produced series seaQuest DSV, however once executive producer Steven Spielberg saw the pilot he removed his name from the series credits. Reportedly, staff at both NBC and Amblin began derogatorily referring to the series as Gilligan's Planet. In response to the negative internal reception and pre-release publicity, NBC delayed the show's premiere until November so the pilot could undergo reshoots.

Earth 2 broke new ground by placing Devon Adair as one of the first female commanders in a science fiction television show, preceding the much better-known Captain Kathryn Janeway of Star Trek: Voyager by more than two months.

The overarching plot of the show and various individual elements helped explore the Gaia hypothesis, mainly through the Syndrome, its effects on many children, and the subsequent healing of the illness after the Eden Project arrives on G889.

During the show, various political and social themes were addressed as well. Throughout the series aspects of the relation of Terrians to the planet and to the colonists reflect the history of colonies with native populations and slavery. In "The Enemy Within", Julia is left behind by the group because of her treachery, addressing briefly what punishments are moral or even inhumane. Another aspect of this issue is addressed in "The Man Who Fell to Earth (Two)", when the group meets a man named Gaal who claims to be an astronaut but is revealed as a marooned criminal; when it is revealed that G889 had been used for many years as a penal colony, questions arise as to the motivations of the Council and their right to do so. In "Redemption", the group encounters a genetically enhanced killer called Z.E.D., who was left on the planet to dispose of all the humans he finds, who at the time had been criminals.

=== Filming locations ===
Exterior shots filmed in New Mexico locations such as Kasha Katuwe Tent Rocks and Diablo Canyon, provided the setting for the series.

== Episodes ==
(Note: Due to presentation choices of the network, some episodes of this series were aired out of narrative sequence. The table below includes the episode numbering of most recent home media release of the series.)

No.	DVD order	Title	Directed by	Written by	Original release date	Prod. code
1	1	"First Contact"	Scott Winant	S : Billy Ray; S/T : Michael Duggan, Carol Flint & Mark Levin	November 6, 1994	69301
A group of humans leaves the space stations in Earth orbit to travel to a planet 22 light-years away named G889 in hopes of a better life for sick children afflicted with an illness known only as "the syndrome". An advance team will prepare the new colony for the remaining 250 families that will arrive in 26 months; however their craft crash-lands. While scouting for their missing supplies Commander O'Neill is apparently killed by a small creature that True had been nurturing. The advance team find that G889 is inhabited by subterranean dwelling natives called Terrians who communicate with Alonzo through dreams. Uly is captured and taken underground by the Terrians but Devon brokers a deal and Uly is returned, healed and healthy. Note: This pilot for the series aired as a 2-hour television movie.
2	2	"The Man Who Fell to Earth (Two)"	Félix Enríquez Alcalá	Mark Levin	November 13, 1994	69302
Day 3 (Act 1, John Danziger narrating). The Eden project befriends an Earth astronaut, Gaal (Tim Curry), who had previously crash-landed on G889. Alonzo has Terrian dreams and is unable to sleep. True's pet creature stings Morgan, injecting him with its venom. Gaal tells the group that the creature's sting is not life threatening but will render a human unconscious for a day or two. The group realise that they have buried Commander O'Neill alive and return to save him.
3	3	"Life Lessons"	Daniel Sackheim	Jennifer Flackett	November 20, 1994	69304
Two weeks after the crash (Act 1, True Danziger narrating). Gaal attempts to befriend True to enable him to accomplish his goals when he sees the lack of attention she receives from the others. He attempts to disrupt the survivors' encampment until his identity is discovered by Yale. Gaal is then banished from the camp.
4	4	"Promises, Promises"	Félix Enríquez Alcalá	P.K. Simonds	November 27, 1994	69310
Gaal abducts several Terrians and uses them as slave labour, coercing them with torture. Uly begins to become ill again and Alonzo discovers that Uly's wellbeing is linked to the Terrians. Due to a promise made by Devon in "First Contact" the Eden Project aids in freeing the captured Terrians. Gaal is then taken underground by the Terrians.
5	5	"A Memory Play"	Deborah Reinisch	Jennifer Flackett & Mark Levin	December 4, 1994	69313
Day 21 (Teaser, Devon Adair narrating). The colonists discover a third escape pod with people infected by a disease. The disease turns out to have been caused by a chip that was inserted into a crew-members brain back on earth. Grendler saliva is discovered to be the cure. It is disclosed that the crash was not an accident but was sabotage by a Council agent.
6	7	"Water"	Joe Napolitano	Carol Flint	December 11, 1994	69303
The Grendlers rob the Eden project's water reserves, with dwindling supplies, and in need the group must scan for bodies of water. Danziger and Devon head out to search for water but encounter some Terrians and must try to show them that they have peaceful intentions.
7	8	"The Church of Morgan"	Joe Napolitano	Michael Duggan	December 18, 1994	69309
Day 38 (Teaser, Julia Heller narrating). Morgan and Bess argue while Julia contemplates removing Uly's pineal gland at the behest of the Council member Reilly. Uly is becoming an evolutionary link with the Terrians, while the marriage of Bess and Morgan is threatened when Bess confesses to him that she had thoughts of cheating on him.
8	9	"The Enemy Within"	John Harrison	Eric Estrin & Michael Berlin	January 8, 1995	69316
Day 49 (Teaser, Julia Heller narrating). Julia injects some of Uly's DNA into herself, she becomes slightly insane and short tempered, True discovers what she has been doing and must persuade the group she is not lying, while Julia sleeps the group has a vote on what to do about her, the group decides to abandon her and leave her with minimal supplies.
9	10	"Redemption" "Sacrifice & Redemption"	Joe Ann Fogle	Arthur Sellers	January 22, 1995	69317
Day 51 (Teaser, Devon Adair narrating). After abandoning Julia in the previous episode, Alonzo decides to go back for Julia, against the wishes of the group. Yale is shot with an explosive bullet. Julia, now back with the group, communicates with her VR contact, Reilly, and learns that the shooter is a ZED unit, an uncontrollable cyborg soldier.
10	11	"Moon Cross"	Sandy Smolan	Carol Flint	February 5, 1995	69314
Day 61 (Teaser, Alonzo Solace narrating). Winter approaches and the group considers where to put down camp, Uly proposes "Mary's Garden," which he knows through the Terrians. Alonzo discovers a young human woman living nearby with the Terrians, whose parents years prior had been killed by Renegade Terrians. Mary reveals they want Uly to be their link with colonists.
11	12	"Better Living Through Morganite, Part 1"	Jim Charleston	P.K. Simonds	February 19, 1995	69308
Day 66 (Teaser, Morgan Martin narrating). Yale begins to regain his memories, Morgan finds glowing rocks and he and Bess decide to stake a claim to the planet, Bess however changes her mind, Morgan does not and decides to set off the geo-lock, he discovers, however, that Bess is within the geo-lock perimeter, and goes into the caves to save her before the geo-lock activates.
12	13	"Better Living Through Morganite, Part 2"	Frank De Palma	P.K. Simonds	February 26, 1995	69315
Day 68 (Teaser, Morgan Martin narrating). Mary saves Yale from Terrian punishment after he is captured (along with Morgan and Bess,) after the activation of the geo-lock "disables" the Terrians' dream plane, Yale finds out that he is not a criminal when Mary helps him use the rocks to learn of his past. Morgan tries to crack the geo-lock abort code so that they can reverse its effects on the planet.
13	14	"Grendlers in the Myst"	Janet Davidson	Heather MacGillvray & Linda Mathious	March 5, 1995	69312
Day 72 (Teaser, John Danziger narrating). The colonists believe they have located a killer after sharing a common dream about a woman much like their mothers, this awakens emotions in True, who had never known her mother, and drives the others to try to locate this woman aided by a Grendler when they start to receive transmissions from her on their equipment.
14	15	"The Greatest Love Story Never Told"	James Frawley	Mark Levin & Jennifer Flackett	March 12, 1995	69319
While on a scouting mission Danziger becomes ill and is rescued by a colony of reformed penal colonists who are living underground with the Terrians, via the dream plane Alonzo learn where Danziger is, Devon leaves alone to retrieve him with True secretly stowing away. Revelations about Devon's past and motives for coming to G889 occur.
15	16	"Brave New Pacifica"	Joe Napolitano	Carol Flint	March 26, 1995	69323
Two scavenging Grendlers come across a box containing human blood and become addicted to it, the Grendlers inadvertently lead the colonists to find a natural means of efficient transportation which they at first believe leads to New Pacifica, Julia is held hostage for human blood. Devon, Danziger and Alonzo become stuck attempting to save Julia.
16	18	"After the Thaw"	Michael Grossman	Théo Cohan	April 2, 1995	69322
Day 109 (Teaser, Alonzo Solace narrating). Julia discovers an ancient Terrian body preserved within ice, insisting on excavating it the group excavate the body, however strange things begin to happen when they bring it to camp, leading to a colonist being possessed. The underground reformed penal colonists explain to them the Terrians beliefs about the ancient Terrian.
17	17	"The Boy Who Would be Terrian King"	Jim Charleston	Heather MacGillvray & Linda Mathious	April 23, 1995	69320
Day 104 (Act 1, Ulysses Adair narrating). On Uly's ninth birthday while sleeping a 25-year-old Uly appears in Devon's dream, he tells her that she must convince his younger self to hide some of his DNA in a particular hiding spot within a Terrian cave, he will not reveal why, Devon becomes wary when she finds out that these Terrians are hostile towards humans.
18	19	"Survival of the Fittest"	John Harrison	John Harrison	April 23, 1995	69324
Day 117 (Act 1, John Danziger narrating). Danziger, Alonzo, Julia and Morgan are out scouting for one of their cargo-pods, on arrival they discover it broken up and the supplies gone, driving back they crash and have to await rescue, with no food or water they begin to act strangely after consuming a Grendler while attempting to survive the harsh conditions of winter.
19	21	"All About Eve"	John Harrison	Robert Crais	May 21, 1995	69321
The colonists are becoming sick from an unknown illness. While in VR a man appears to Morgan and instructs him to an old Earth ship, which they discover still has nuclear power and occupants in cold-sleep. Two scientists survive the revival, and reveal the cause for the illness. Julia finds out Reilly is actually a computer program.
20	6	"Natural Born Grendlers"	Michael Grossman	S : Carl Cramer & David Solmonson; T : Jennifer Flackett & P.K. Simonds	May 28, 1995	69318
Four weeks after the crash (Act 1, Devon Adair talking to Yale). Alonzo begins to get depressed about being marooned on "Earth 2" and attempts suicide, the Terrians help him via the dream plane. Bess trades for supplies with a friendly Grendler and barters away Morgan's VR gear, a depressed Morgan is not happy about losing his gear, Bess returns to the Grendler and tries to trade his VR gear back.
21	20	"Flower Child"	Jim Charleston	Carl Cramer	June 4, 1995	69311
Day 130 (Teaser, Morgan Martin narrating). Scouting for food, Danziger and Bess exhibit strange symptoms after being sprayed with a native plant's pollen. Danziger allows Julia to remove the pollen from his lungs, however Bess refuses and has the desire to head North in the cold without a coat or shoes. Bess asks Morgan to trust her, and Morgan helps Bess to her destination.

== Broadcast ==
The series premiered on November 6, 1994, with a two-hour pilot episode ("Earth 2: First Contact") that ran from 7 p.m. to 9 p.m. EST (including advertisements—it was later split into two episodes for syndication). The following week it moved to a regular time slot. On April 23, 1995, two individual episodes were aired back-to-back from 7 p.m. to 9 p.m. EST.

It was also aired in Austria, Australia, Canada, Finland, Germany, Hungary, Italy, Netherlands, New Zealand, Poland, Spain and United Kingdom, later in 1995 Greece and Egypt in the fall of 1997, and in Turkey and Norway in 1998. In 2011 it aired on TV4 Science Fiction in Sweden.

== Other media ==
=== DVD release and online streaming ===
The complete series, comprising 21 episodes including the two-hour pilot, was released on DVD on July 19, 2005, in the United States in Region 1 format, on four dual-sided discs. The two parts of "First Contact" originally aired as the pilot in one feature-length 90-minute episode (95 minutes and 30 seconds on the Region 4 DVD).

The set includes all 21 episodes in order according to the air date—not the production order—resulting in two episodes ("Natural Born Grendlers" and "Flower Child") being ordered after the final episode, "All About Eve". These two were originally not aired until after the planned season finale had been aired and it was then known that the series had been cancelled; with the series not renewed the season finale became the series finale. In the order of production, and more importantly of the story line, the episode "Natural Born Grendlers" should have followed "Life Lessons". (Clue: Alonzo has a cut on his forehead in "Promises" which he got in "Natural Born Grendlers". However, most people place it after "Promises, Promises" because the three Gaal episodes were shown as a group.) The episode "The Boy Who Would Be Terrian King" (day 104 on the planet) takes place before "After the Thaw" (day 109 on the planet), and "Flower Child" should have followed "Survival of the Fittest". In addition to the episodes, the set includes eight deleted and extended scenes, and out-takes.

Another DVD set titled Earth 2: The Complete Series was released on May 28, 2012, for Region 2. It corrected the above-mentioned episode order problem by placing them in narrative order, and included a card explaining that the trailers attached to the end of some episodes would not match the corrected play order.

Netflix in the United States streamed the episodes in production order.

=== Novels ===
Three Earth 2 novels were published between December 1994 and May 1995. The first was a novelization of the two-part premiere. The remaining two were original stories.

- Earth 2: A Novel (Melissa Crandall, December 1994) ISBN 0-441-00146-7
- Puzzle (Sean Dalton, February 1995) ISBN 0-441-00148-3
- Leather Wings (John Vornholt, May 1995) ISBN 0-441-00198-X
