= Stover Engine Works =

American engine manufacturer

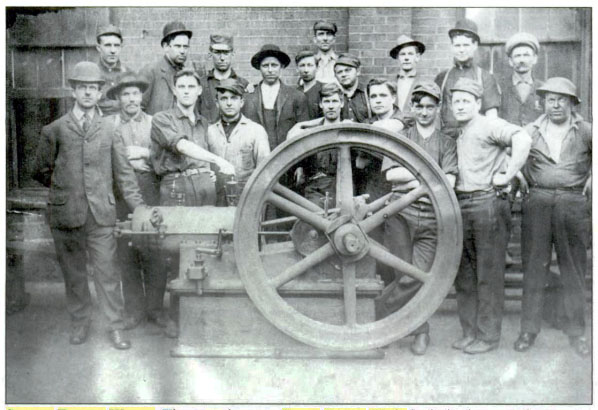
- 1911 Stover Engine Works
- Industry: Engine Manufacturing
- Founded: 1898; 127 years ago in Freeport, U.S.
- Founder: D.C. Stover
- Headquarters: Freeport, U.S., United States
- Products: Gasoline Engines
- Owner: Hon D.C. Stover

Stover Engine Works was a manufacturer of stationary gasoline engines based in Freeport, Illinois. The company was started by D.C. Stover in 1898.

== History ==
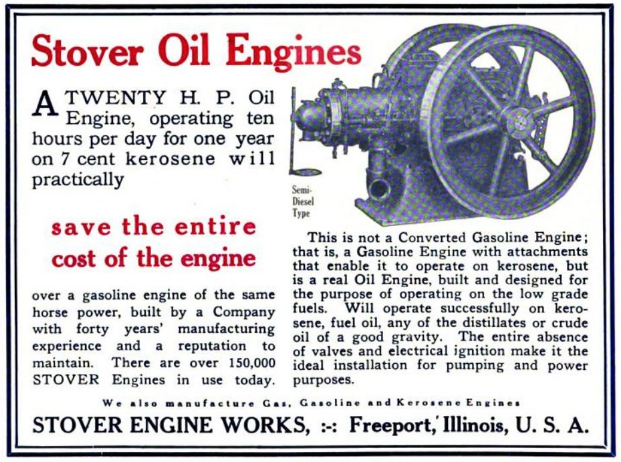
July 1914 Stover Engine Works advertisement for oil engines.

The Stover Engine Works began to create prototype gasoline engines in 1895. The company was formed in 1898. They finalized one of their basic engines in 1904. That version of their engine was in use until the 1920s.

In 1906 the business required a larger building. They built a 3-story building with 21,600. D.C. Stover also worked employed his nephews, Jacob Stover and Frederick Dawson.

The company made engines that could operate on Kerosine. Many were used for pumping or generating power. By 1907 the company was making engines that were as small as 2 horsepower and as high as 50 horsepower in 1907.

The company built a variety of engines including marine motors, and also started the Stover Motor Car Company. He also operated the Stover Motor Car Company for the manufacture of automobiles and marine motors. The engines were known for their simplicity.

By 1914 the company added a 60-horsepower model. The majority of their engines were primarily 1 cylinder, but the 40, 50 and 60 horsepower models were 2 cylinders. One of the best features for consumers was the ability of the engine to work with the less expensive crude oil.

The Stover company and its various company names, made more than 277,000 engines of various sizes and uses.
