= Hiromi Goto =

Japanese-Canadian writer, editor, and instructor of creative writing

- Born: December 31, 1966 (age 59); Chiba-ken, Japan
- Occupations: Writer, Editor, and Teacher
- Website: www.hiromigoto.com

Hiromi Goto (born December 31, 1966, in Chiba-ken, Japan) is a Japanese-Canadian writer, editor, and instructor of creative writing.

== Life ==
Goto was born in Chiba'ken, Japan in 1966 and immigrated to Canada with her family in 1969. They lived on the west coast of British Columbia for eight years before moving to Nanton, Alberta, a small town in the foothills of the Rocky Mountains where her father farmed mushrooms. Goto earned her B.A. in English from the University of Calgary in 1989, where she received creative writing instruction from Aritha Van Herk and Fred Wah.

Goto's grandmother told her Japanese stories when she was growing up. Her work is also influenced by her father's life stories in Japan. These stories often featured ghosts and folk creatures such as the kappa — a small creature with a frog's body, a turtle's shell and a bowl-shaped head that holds water. Her writing commonly explores the themes of race, gender and cultural experiences, like eating, while moving between the realms of fantasy, horror and reality.

Her first novel, Chorus of Mushrooms, was the 1995 recipient of the Commonwealth Writers' Prize Best First Book Canada and Caribbean Region' and the co-winner of the Canada-Japan Book Award. It has been released in Israel, Italy, Germany, and the United Kingdom. In 2001, she was awarded the James Tiptree, Jr. Award and was short-listed for the regional Commonwealth Writer's Prize, Best Book Award, the Sunburst Award and the Spectrum Award.

Chorus of Mushrooms is about three generations of Japanese women in Canada, searching for identity in the midst of alienation and an often-hostile host country. The novel explores these characters' diverse, conflicting perspectives towards assimilation into the majority culture, and through the seamless blending of memory, history, and myth, develops a powerful conversation about what it means to belong. Goto speaks to a diasporic experience, on cultural conflicts held on stages from food to hygiene to language, and to the price paid for denying one's origins.

Goto has been the Writer-in-Residence for numerous institutions, including Athabasca University (2012-2013), the University of Alberta (2009-2010), Simon Fraser University (2008), Vancouver Public Library (2007) and Vancouver's Emily Carr University of Art and Design. She was the co-Guest of Honor of the 2014 WisCon science fiction convention in Madison, Wisconsin. where she gave a well-received speech on her experiences as a writer. Goto's graphic novel Shadow Life was selected as the Simon Fraser University Library's One Book One SFU choice in 2022.

== Bibliography ==
- The Skin on Our Tongues. Calgary: Absinthe, 1993. (co-editor)
- Chorus of Mushrooms. Edmonton: NeWest, 1994.
- The Water of Possibility. Regina: Coteau, 2001. ISBN 1-55050-183-6
- The Kappa Child. Red Deer, AB: Red Deer, 2001.
- Hopeful Monsters. Vancouver: Arsenal Pulp Press, 2004.
- Half World. Puffin Canada, 2009. ISBN 978-0-670-06965-1
- Darkest Light. Puffin Canada, 2012. ISBN 978-0-670-06527-1
- Shadow Life. Raincoast, 2021. ISBN 978-1-62672-356-6
