= Broad Universe =

Broad Universe is a United States-based, all volunteer organization with the primary goal of promoting science fiction, fantasy, and horror written by women. Writers, editors, publishers, reviewers, artists, and fans are invited to join them. "Broad-minded" men are welcome to participate. The organization originated in a panel discussion at WisCon, the feminist science fiction convention in Madison, Wisconsin, in 2000.

Broad Universe created the Rapid Fire Reading with a small group of member authors who each read an excerpt from their work no more than 5 minutes long. This has been very popular at conventions. It gives more authors an opportunity to read and it gives the audience a taste of fantastic fiction from several authors instead of just one.

Broad Universe buys dealer's tables at various conventions (genre related or publishers, librarians and other conventions of use to the members.) One member benefit is the sale of their books at 0% commission by Broad Universe volunteers at conventions.

== See also ==
- Female science fiction authors
- Feminist science fiction
- James Tiptree, Jr. Award
- Sex and sexuality in speculative fiction
- Women in speculative fiction
