= The Witch and the Chameleon =

Cover of The Witch and the Chameleon

The Witch and the Chameleon was a Canadian science fiction fanzine published 1974–1976 by Amanda Bankier in Hamilton, Ontario. It is generally recognized as the first explicitly feminist fanzine. It ran for five issues, the last being nominally a "double issue" numbered 5/6.

Bankier was invited to be Fan Guest of Honor at the first WisCon on February 11–13, 1977, because of her pioneering role as editor of The Witch and the Chameleon.

== See also ==
- Janus (science fiction magazine)
- Feminist science fiction
- Women in speculative fiction
