= Jeanne Gomoll =

American editor

Jeanne Gomoll is an American artist, writer, editor, and science fiction fan, who was recognized as one of the guests of honor at the 72nd World Science Fiction Convention (Loncon 3, the 2014 WorldCon), having been a guest of honor at numerous previous science fiction conventions. She has been nominated multiple times for awards in artist and fanzine categories, and for service to the genre of science fiction, particularly feminist science fiction.

== Background ==
Gomoll attended the University of Wisconsin-Madison, where (along with later collaborator Janice Bogstad) she attended the first science fiction course offered at the university, although (in her words) "I had been really turned off in the later part of high school and college by the really sexist stuff going on in the genre".

== Fandom, science fiction and feminism ==
In 1975, soon after graduating with a B.A. in geography, she was actively involved in a feminist reading group in Madison, Wisconsin, which she tried to convince to explore the potential of the SF genre. Gomoll read an advertisement in the Badger Herald seeking people interested in working on an SF fanzine. The core group (which included Lesleigh and Hank Luttrell, editors of the Hugo-nominated fanzine Starling) was putting together what was to become the feminist science fiction fanzine, Janus (later Aurora SF). Gomoll was initially recruited as an artist and designer, but became a writer and co-editor by the third issue. Janus was to be repeatedly nominated for the Hugo Award for Best Fanzine (1978, 1979 and 1980); this led to accusations that if Janus had not been feminist, it would not have been nominated.

She has worked with WisCon since its inception, and has served as editor of several items for WisCon's sponsoring organization SF(3) and for the James Tiptree, Jr. Award and other efforts related to feminist science fiction fandom.

=== "An Open Letter to Joanna Russ" ===
Gomoll is the author of "An Open Letter to Joanna Russ", a famous and oft-reprinted essay revisiting Joanna Russ' influential critiques of science fiction and the suppression in literary history of the role of women in writing (especially How to Suppress Women's Writing). The essay was a response to Bruce Sterling's exclusion of women's writing of the 1970s from his introduction to cyberpunk anthology Burning Chrome. Gomoll's open letter not only challenged Sterling's account, but recounts the history of women's involvement in science fiction writing and fandom during the 1970s.

== Professional work ==
Gomoll is a professional artist still based in Madison. From September 1979–July 2003, she was employed by the Wisconsin Department of Natural Resources as a graphic designer, also serving as illustrator of publications such as Nature's Recyclers Coloring Book and Butterflies & Roadways: How Rights of Way Maintenance Can Help Endandered Species. In 2018 she retired and closed her graphic design business, Union Street Design.

== Selected bibliography ==
Essays

- "An Open Letter to Joanna Russ", Aurora, v.10, n.1 (Winter 1986-87).
- Introduction: "Visualizing the Future," to Women of Other Worlds: Excursions through SF & Feminism, edited by Helen Merrick & Tess Williams, University of Western Australia Press, 1999
- TAFForensic Report: A Cold Case Investigation, Union Street Design/LULU, 2020.

Edited collections and journals

- Editor, Janus (#1-18, 1975-1980)
- Editorial collective member for Aurora (#19-26, 1981–90)
- Obsessions, apazine for A Women's Apa, (#1-29, 1976-1983)
- Shoreline, apazine, for the Cascade Regional Apa (#1-11, 1978–81)
- Cube, SF(3) newszine (#1-13, 1982-1985)
- Allargando, apazine for Turbo-Charged Party Animal Apa, (#1-16, September 1986 to 1988)
- Union Street, apazine with Scott Custis for Turbo-Charged Party Animal Apa, (#1-111, September 1989 – present)
- Editor (with Diane Martin) and designer of The Bakery Men Don't See, cookbook and fund-raiser for the Tiptree Award, SF(3), 1991 (which was nominated for a Hugo Award
- Editor and designer of Her Smoke Rose Up from Supper, cookbook and fund-raiser for the Tiptree Award, SF3, 1993
- Grayscale, apazine for Intercourse apa, (#1-15, September 1996 – present)

Significant con roles

- Chair, WisCon 20 (1996)
- Chair, WisCon 30 (2006)
- James Tiptree, Jr. Award - judge and coordinator (1994)
- James Tiptree, Jr. Award "motherboard" member

== Honors and awards ==
- Hugo Award for Best Fan Artist nomination, (1978, 1979, 1980)
- Hugo Award for Best Fanzine nomination, (1978, 1980)
- FFAN awards, fan editor (1979, 1980)
- ArmadilloCon fan guest (1979)
- AutoClave GoH (1979)
- Aquacon GoH (1981)
- Trans-Atlantic Fan Fund delegate, 1987–1988
- Hugo Award for Best Related Work nomination, (1992)
- Reinconation GoH (2000)
- WisCon 24 GoH (2000)
- Apollocon GoH (2011)
- Thomas D. Clareson Award for Distinguished Service (2011)
- Guest of honor, 72nd World Science Fiction Convention (LonCon 3; 2014)

== Additional references ==
Interviews and Profiles

- "Jeanne Gomoll", Fan Guest of Honor, ApolloCon (2010)
- "Jeanne Gomoll" entry in Reid, Robin, Encyclopedia of Women in Science Fiction and Fantasy

Databases

- Jeanne Gomoll at the Internet Speculative Fiction Database
- "Jeanne Gomoll", TAMU SFFRD database.

Additional references

- Lefanu, Sarah, In the Chinks of the World Machine: Feminism and Science Fiction. London: The Women's Press, 1988.
- Merrick, Helen and Tess Williams, editors, Women of Other Worlds: Excursions through Science Fiction and Feminism. Crawley, Western Australia: University of Western Australia Press, 1999.
- various editors WisCon Chronicles, Volumes 1-6. Seattle: Aqueduct Press, 2007-2012.
- Merrick, Helen. The Secret Feminist Cabal: A Cultural History of Science Fiction Feminism. Seattle: Aqueduct Press, 2009.
