= Stover Bicycle Manufacturing Company =

American bicycle manufacturer

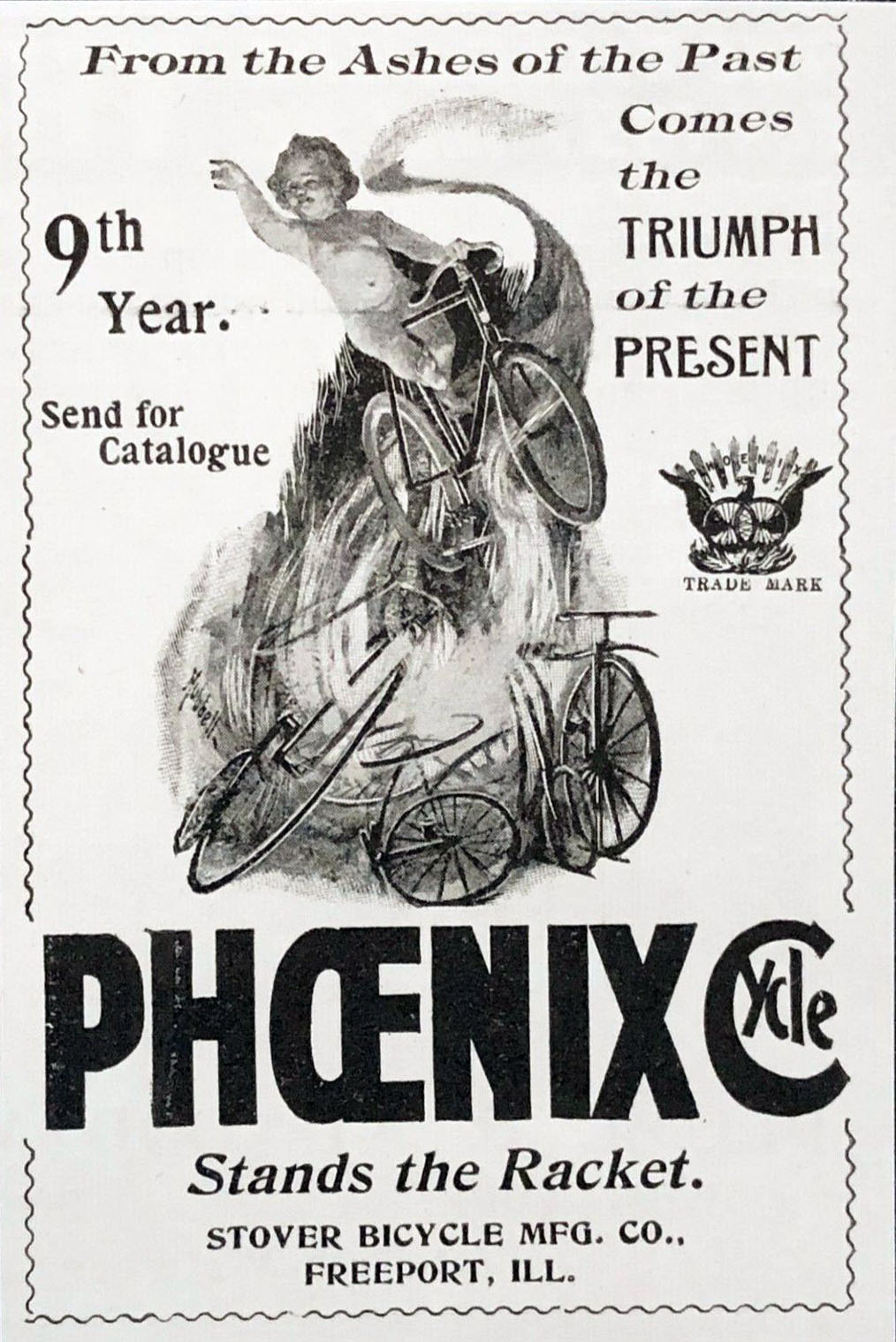
- 1897
- Industry: Bicycle manufacturing
- Founded: 1889; 136 years ago in Freeport, U.S.
- Founder: Hon D.C. Stover
- Defunct: 1899
- Successor: Bicycle Trust American Bicycle Company
- Headquarters: Freeport, U.S., United States
- Products: Bicycles
- Owner: Hon D.C. Stover

Stover Bicycle Manufacturing Company was a bicycle manufacturer in Freeport, Illinois founded by D.C. Stover. The company produced 20,000 bicycles a year in 1897.

== History ==
=== Background ===
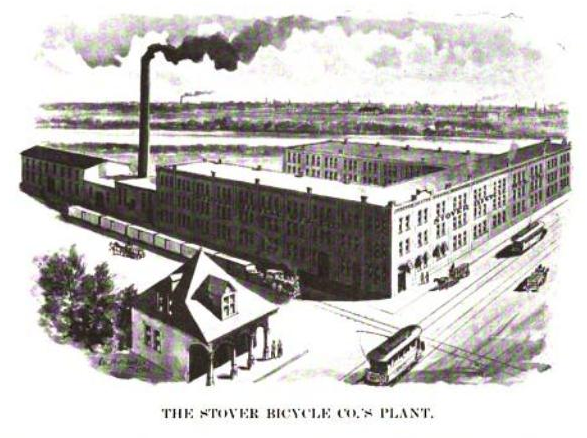
Stover Bicycle Manufacturing Company 1896

The company was founded by Stover in 1889, and the first year they produced 320 bicycles (also known as Wheels) and they had 6 employees. D.C. Stover was the owner of the company and several other companies with the moniker Stover. The company produced bicycles under the name Phoenix. They were one of the early manufacturers of the Safety bicycle.

By 1897, the company had become one of the larger bicycle producers and had total production capacity of 20,000 bicycles per year: 120 bicycles a day.

=== Products ===
The company manufactured three different bicycles: The Tiger, The Iroquois, and The Paragon. In 1890 they began construction of a larger manufacturing plant in Freeport.

=== Sale of the company ===
In 1899 the company was sold to a Bicycle Trust which organized under the name American Bicycle Company. The American Bicycle Company only lasted a few years (from 1899-1903). Historians have not determined why the company failed but they have several theories. One idea was that the company was poorly organized, and another theory is that the various manufacturers involved in the company had different objectives. After the breakup the many different companies went back to competing.
