= Magnus Flyte =

American novelist

Magnus Flyte is the male pseudonym used by writing duo Meg Howrey and Christina Lynch. As Magnus Flyte, they have written two novels, New York Times bestseller City of Dark Magic and City of Lost Dreams, both of which are published by Penguin Books. The persona of Magnus Flyte is characterized by his obscurity and elusive nature regarding the public, as well as his conflicting biographical details.

== Lives and careers ==
Meg Howrey, who lives in Los Angeles, California, is the author of the novels The Cranes Dance and Blind Sight. Some of her nonfiction writing has been featured in Vogue and The Los Angeles Review of Books. Previously, Howrey was a professional dancer for the Joffrey Ballet and City Ballet of Los Angeles.

Christina Lynch lives near Sequoia National Park and works as a journalist and television writer. Previously a Milan correspondent for W magazine, now she teaches English at College of the Sequoias and is the faculty advisor for the school's literary magazine. She also teaches television writing for UCLA Extension and works as an online book coach for Antioch University LA. Her writing has been featured in various magazines and other publications. According to her website, she is currently writing a novel set in Italy in 1956.

Howrey and Lynch first met and became friends at a writers' retreat. The idea to collaborate on a novel came while Howrey was visiting Lynch at her home near Sequoia National Park. The setting for City of Dark Magic was initially inspired by Lynch's stepmother, who lives in Prague and had recently taken a position at the Lobkowicz Palace Museum.

== Books and reception ==
Carolyn Carlson at Penguin Books described City of Dark Magic as a "Very Rare Find." Kirkus Reviews describes City of Dark Magic as an "exuberant, surprising gem" and a "fast-paced, funny, romantic mystery."

City of Dark Magic, which takes place in Prague, features musicologist Sarah Weston who is hired to catalog Beethoven manuscripts at the Lobkowicz Palace following the on-site death of her mentor Professor Sherbatsky. While trying to investigate the real cause of her mentor's death, she becomes intrigued by Beethoven's "Immortal Beloved" as she unearths clues regarding the individual's identity throughout her employment at the palace.

The sequel to City of Dark Magic, titled City of Lost Dreams, is set in Vienna, Austria, and recounts Sarah Weston and friends' journey to find the Golden Fleece—not seeking immortality but to find a cure for friend and child prodigy Pollina. Both of Magnus Flyte's books are novels of adventure that incorporate science, magic, history, and art with a strong female lead.

== Bibliography ==
As Magnus Flyte

- City of Dark Magic (November 2012)
- City of Lost Dreams (November 2013)

By Meg Howrey

- Blind Sight (March 2011)
- The Cranes Dance (May 2012)
- The Wanderers (March 2017)

By Christina Lynch

- Long Hidden: Speculative Fiction from the Margins of History (May 2014 anthology)
