= Marcia J. Bennett =

American writer

Marcia Joanne Bennett
- Born: June 9, 1945 (age 81); Norwich, New York, United States
- Writing career
- Pen name: M.J. Bennett
- Period: 1983–present
- Genre: fantasy
- Notable work: The Ni-Lach series

Marcia Joanne Bennett (born June 9, 1945, sometimes credited as M.J. Bennett), is an American writer of fantasy and science fiction novels, including the Ni-Lach series and the novel Yaril's Children.

== Biography ==
Born in Norwich, New York, daughter of Richard (a carpenter) and Reatha (née Albright). After graduating from Albany Business College in 1965, she worked in the banking industry as first a secretary and then a teller. She opened a craft shop in Earlville, New York in 1972, which came to serve as her writing studio.

About her work, Bennett states, "For me writing was a natural progression from years of being an avid reader. That, coupled with a penchant for daydreaming, led me to a hobby that quickly became an addiction. I choose to write fantasy and science fiction because they give me a freedom I do not find in other types of literature."

== Themes and critical response ==
In an interview with Contemporary Authors Online, Bennett said of her work, "Friendship and tolerance are my main themes." Though her novels produced lukewarm reactions from some critics (The Encyclopedia of Science Fiction noting, "The local-colour quotient is high, though the sequence [of the Ni-Lach series] itself is unremarkable"), other reviewers had more positive reactions.

Of her debut novel, Where the Ni-Lach, Publishers Weekly wrote, "Bennett's well-depicted characters, sustained sense of mystery and several clever plot twists make for a compelling read." In a review of the second book in the series, The Emergency Librarian said, "The themes of understanding differences, personal responsibility and loyalty to friends, and a group of engaging protagonists enrich the standard adventure plot."

The third novel in the series, Beyond the Draak's Teeth received a "recommended" review from Library Journal: "The values of freedom and friendship hang in a delicate balance in this sf/fantasy adventure."

== Bibliography ==
- Where the Ni-Lach (1983) ISBN 0-345-33123-0
- Shadow Singer (1984) ISBN 0-345-31776-9
- Beyond the Draak's Teeth (1986) ISBN 0-345-31776-9
- Yaril's Children (1988) ISBN 0-345-34844-3
- Seeking the Dream Brother (1989) ISBN 0-345-36001-X
