= Deborah Chester =

American novelist

- Born: 1957 (age 68–69)
- Occupations: Novelist, professor
- Writing career
- Genres: Science fiction, fantasy

Deborah Chester (born 1957) is an American author of over 40 books, primarily science fiction and fantasy novels. She currently holds the John Crain Presidential Professorship at the University of Oklahoma, teaching both undergraduate and graduate courses on writing style and structure in the Gaylord College of Journalism and Mass Communication.

Chester began her career penning romance novels but eventually moved into a variety of genres including adult fiction, science fiction, and fantasy. She has written novels based on popular science fiction television series such as Lucasfilm's Alien Chronicles and Earth 2.

Jim Butcher, author of The Dresden Files, has named her as his primary mentor.

== Bibliography ==
=== Ruby Throne ===
1. Reign of Shadows (1996)
2. Shadow War (1996)
3. Realm of Light (1997)

=== Alien Chronicles ===
1. The Golden One (1997)
2. The Crimson Claw (1998)
3. The Crystal Eye (1999)

=== Nether and Mandria ===
==== Dain ====
1. Dain: The Queen's Gambit (2002)
2. Dain: The King Betrayed (2003)
3. Dain: The Queen's Knight (2004)
4. Dain: The King Imperiled (2005)

==== The Sword, the Ring and the Chalice ====
1. The Sword (2000)
2. The Ring (2000)
3. The Chalice (2001)

=== The Pearls and the Crown ===
1. The Pearls (2007)
2. The Crown (2008)

=== Anthi ===
1. The Children of Anthi (1985 - as Jay D. Blakeney)
2. Requiem for Anthi (1990 - as Jay D. Blakeney)

=== Operation Space Hawks ===
1. Space Hawks (1990 - as Sean Dalton)
2. Code Name Peregrine (1990 - as Sean Dalton)
3. Beyond the Void (1991 - as Sean Dalton)
4. The Rostma Lure (1991 - as Sean Dalton)
5. Destination Mutiny (1991 - as Sean Dalton)
6. The Salukan Gambit (1992 - as Sean Dalton)

=== Time-Trap ===
- Time Trap (1992 - as Sean Dalton)
- Showdown (1992 - as Sean Dalton)
- Pieces of Eight (1992 - as Sean Dalton)
- Restoration (1994 - as Sean Dalton)
- Turncoat (1994 - as Sean Dalton)
- Termination (1995 - as Sean Dalton)

=== Earth 2 ===
- Puzzle (1995 - as Sean Dalton)

=== Other novels ===
- A Love So Wild (1979)
- French Slippers (1981)
- The Sign of the Owl (1981)
- Royal Intrigue (1982)
- Summer's Rapture (1983)
- Hearts Desire (1983)
- Burning Secrets (1984)
- Sweet Passions (1985)
- The Omcri Matrix (1987 - as Jay D. Blakeney)
- Captured Hearts (1989)
- The Goda War (1989 - as Jay D. Blakeney)
- The Fantasy Fiction Formula (2016)

=== Short fiction ===
- "The Street that Forgot Time" short story in Twilight Zone: 19 Original Stories on the 50th Anniversary (2009)

== Sources ==
- http://www.ou.edu/content/gaylord/home/main/faculty_staff/deborah_chester.html
- http://www.fantasticfiction.co.uk/c/deborah-chester/
- http://www.deborahchester.com/bibliography.html
