= Stover Manufacturing and Engine Company =

American machine manufacturer

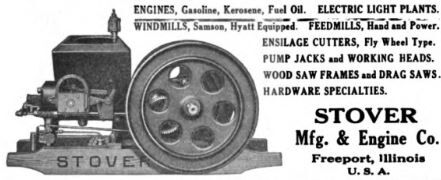
- Early 1924 Ad
- Industry: Stationary Engine Manufacturing
- Founded: 1881 in Freeport, Illinois, USA
- Founder: D.C. Stover
- Defunct: 1942
- Products: Engines, windmills, drag saws, portable sawmills, water tanks, and feed grinders.

The Stover Manufacturing and Engine Company was created by D.C. Stover in 1881. An established inventor, he progressed through a profitable windmill business to, in 1895, the manufacture of kerosene and gasoline powered stationary engines for use on the American farm.

== History ==
The Stover company began producing windmills in 1879. It was incorporated in 1881 as the Stover Manufacturing and Engine Company and by 1922 they had 600 employees.

Stover made more than 277,000 engines of various sizes and uses. Stover licensed some designs to Sears, Roebuck and Co. under the Economy trademark.

In addition to windmills and engines, Stover made a line of cast iron waffle irons.

The main manufacturing plant was located at 301 N Henderson Road in Freeport, IL. Although in disrepair, much of the plant still stands.
