= D. C. Stover =

American industrialist (1839–1908)

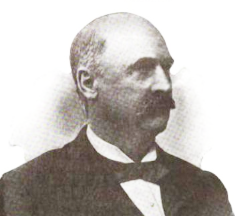
- D. C. Stover, 1896
- Born: Daniel Carroll Stover; May 9, 1839
- Died: January 17, 1908 (aged 68); Freeport, Illinois, US
- Resting place: Spring Grove Cemetery Saint Paris, Champaign County, Ohio
- Citizenship: United States
- Education: Wittenburg College
- Occupation: Manufacturer
- Known for: Bicycle manufacturer
- Notable work: Stover Bicycle Manufacturing Company; Stover Manufacturing Company; Stover Engine Works
- Children: 1

D. C. Stover (May 9, 1839 – January 17, 1908) was an American industrialist in Freeport, Illinois. He founded the Stover Wind Engine Company, the Stover Manufacturing and Engine Company, the Stover Bicycle Manufacturing Company and the Stover Engine Works.

== Early life ==
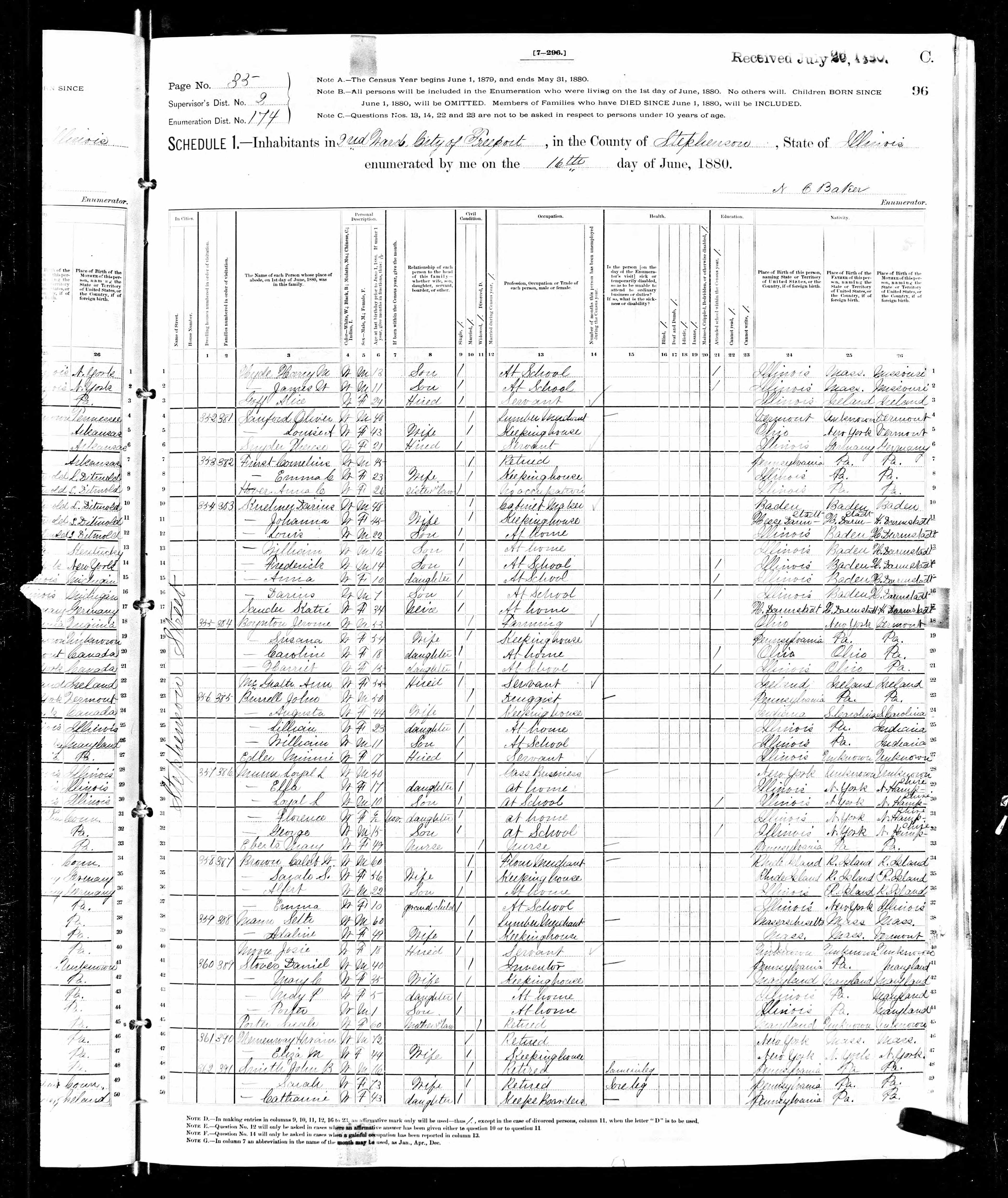
1880 U.S. Census Daniel C. Stover

He was born in Antrim Township, Pennsylvania, May 9, 1839. He was the son of Jacob P. Stover and Elizabeth (née) Emmert Stover. He was the youngest of 12 children and he lived on the family farm in Pennsylvania until he was 18. He moved to California for a time and he worked as a miner. In 1866 he moved to Freeport Illinois. He then worked on inventing farming items, and he invented machines for the manufacture of barbed wire fences. On the 1880 U.S. Census form he listed his occupation as "inventor". (Note: See 1880 Census image)

== Career ==
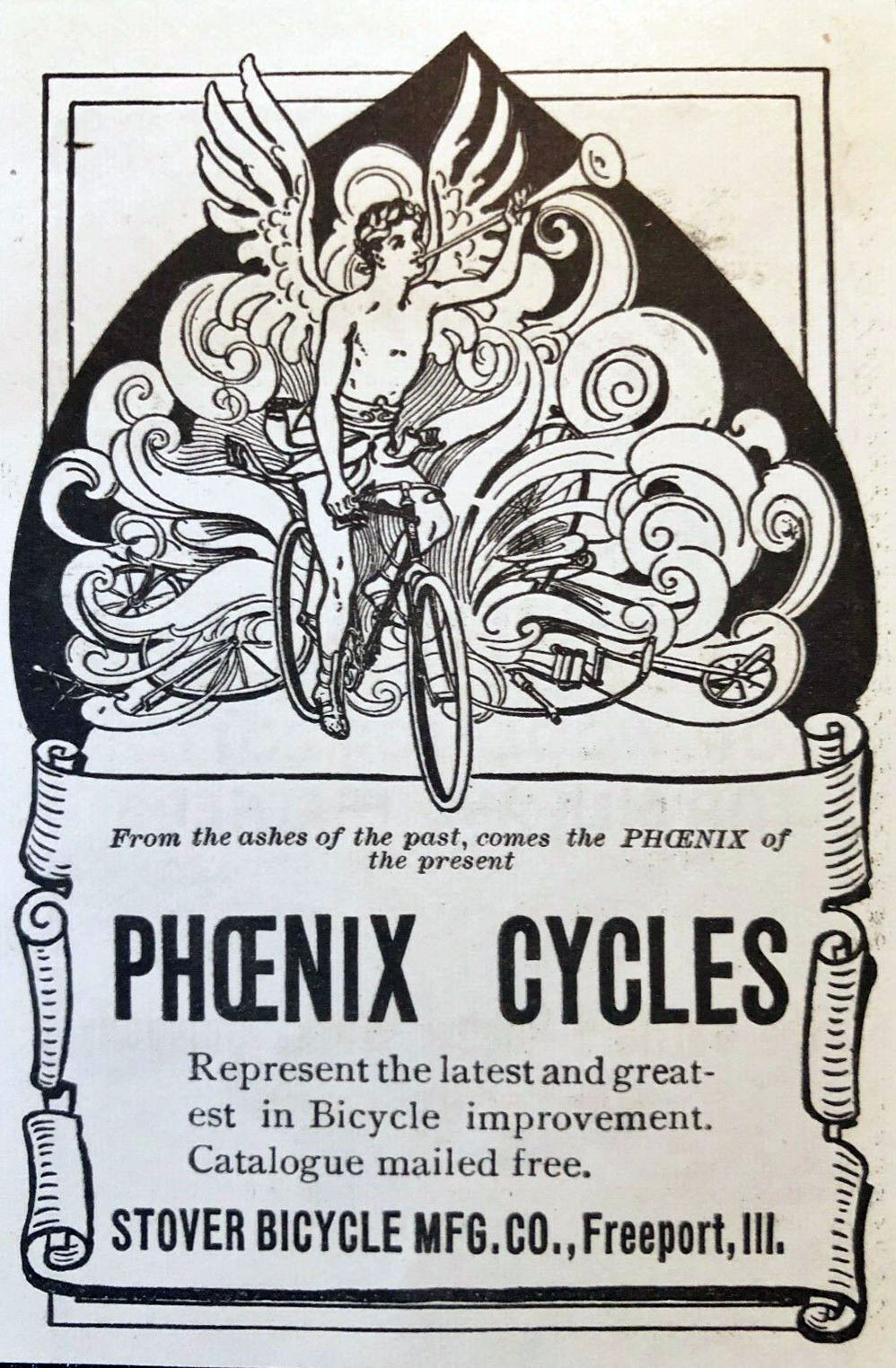
1898 Stover Bicycle Manufacturing Company, Phoenix Cycle ad

Throughout his career he established many businesses. In 1876 Stover established the Stover Wind Engine Company to sell Windmills.

In 1881 Stover started a farming machine manufacturing company called the Stover Manufacturing and Engine Company.

In 1889 Stover founded the Stover Bicycle Manufacturing Company to produce bicycles, starting with six employees. The company produced bicycles under the name Phoenix. They were one of the early manufacturers of the Safety bicycle.

By 1897 his bicycle company had become one of the largest bicycle producers, making 20,000 bicycles per year. By 1899 he had sold the company to a Bicycle Trust which organized under the name American Bicycle Company.

Stover then started several other companies in Freeport, Illinois. He manufactured combustion engines under the name Stover engine Works. He also operated the Stover Motor Car Company, manufacturing automobiles and marine motors.

During Stover's career his companies produced tanks, bicycles, stationary engines, windmills, cultivators and other farm equipment.

== Personal life ==
On July 13, 1871, he married Mary C. Porter. They had a son and a daughter. He made two trips around the world before his death.

== Death ==
Stover's cause of death was reported as a severe heart ailment.
