= Avedon Carol =

British writer and feminist

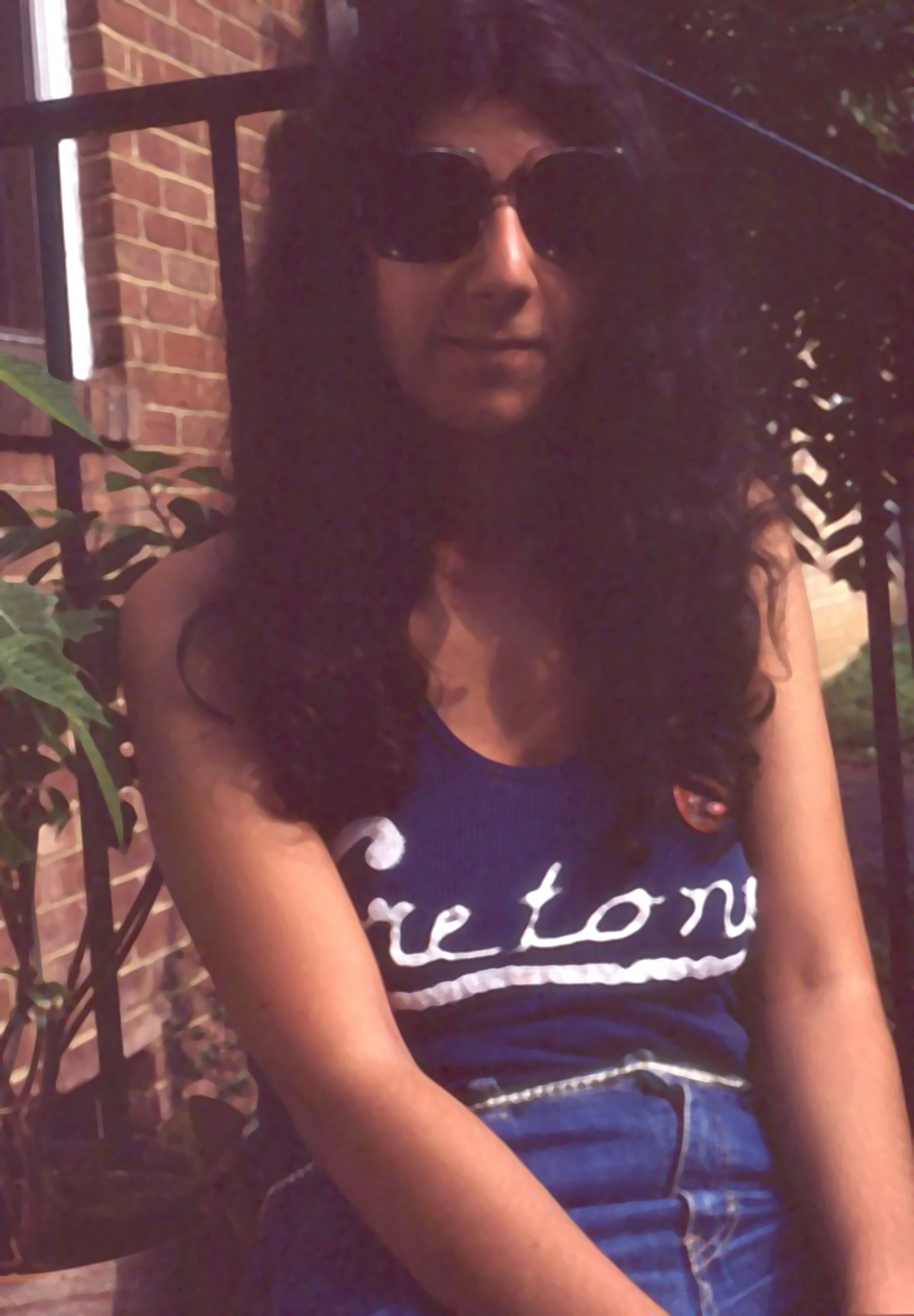
- Avedon Carol, 1979, Arlington, Virginia (photo: Jeff Schalles)
- Born: 1951 (age 74–75); Maryland, US
- Occupations: Feminist, anti-censorship, and civil liberties campaigner
- Writing career
- Notable works: Bad Girls and Dirty Pictures: The Challenge to Reclaim Feminism
- Website: avedoncarol.blogspot.com

Avedon Carol is an American-born British feminist, anti-censorship, and civil liberties campaigner and a researcher in the field of sex crime, residing in England. She is a member of Feminists Against Censorship, and as part of their publishing group co-edited Bad Girls & Dirty Pictures (1993). She is the author of Nudes, Prudes and Attitudes (1994), and has also worked on other books by Feminists Against Censorship. On her own website, "Avedon's Sideshow", she publishes and compiles links to a wide array of stories and events.

== Biography ==
Carol was born in Maryland in 1951, growing up in Kensington, but resides in London.

Carol is a member of Feminists Against Censorship, a women's group fighting for sexual expression and against censorship. Carol has pushed back against feminists Andrea Dworkin and Catharine MacKinnon, claiming the "fear and loathing of the male member" was not fully justified. She declared herself "passionately opposed to censorship".

A well-known figure in science fiction fandom, Avedon was the 1983 winner of the Trans Atlantic Fan Fund, and has been nominated for three Hugo Awards (1989, 1991 and 1992) as Best Fan Writer for her contributions to science fiction fanzines and as an active member of the Amateur Press Associations AWA (A Women's APA) in the US and TWP (The Women's Periodical) in Britain. She was Fan Guest of Honour at Wiscon in Madison, Wisconsin in 1987 and at the British Eastercons in Glasgow in 1983 (Albacon II) and on Jersey in 1989 (Contrivance).

Avedon is one of 12 media panelists for Virtually Speaking Sundays, a weekly podcast discussing (mostly US) current events.

== Bibliography ==
- Carol, Avedon; Assiter, Alison (1993). Bad girls and dirty pictures: the challenge to reclaim feminism. London Boulder, Colorado: Pluto Press. ISBN 9780745305240.
- Carol, Avedon (1994). Nudes, prudes and attitudes: pornography and censorship. Cheltenham: New Clarion Press. ISBN 9781873797143.

== See also ==
- Sex-positive feminism
- Alison Assiter
