= Lee Killough =

American novelist

- Born: Karen Lee Killough; 1942 (age 83–84)
- Occupations: Author, veterinary radiographer
- Spouse: Pat
- Writing career
- Genres: Science fiction Supernatural; Vampire; Mystery

Karen Lee Killough (born 1942) is an American veterinary radiographer and writer of science fiction mystery novels under the name Lee Killough. She lives and works in Manhattan, Kansas.

== Writing career ==
Killough began her writing career with short stories. After a conversation at a science fiction convention with Joe Haldeman and James Gunn, she became convinced that the only practical way to continue writing was to write novels. She enjoys the conventions, and has explicitly said that the idea for her novel Deadly Silents was given her as a gift by a fan with whom she had discussed law enforcement at a convention, who felt he would never get a chance to write a novel based on the idea.

== Published works ==
=== Series ===
Bloodwalk

1. Blood Hunt (ISBN 0-8125-0594-8, 1987)
2. Bloodlinks (ISBN 0-8125-2064-5, 1988)
3. Blood Games (ISBN 1-892065-41-X, 2001)

The first two were published in omnibus form as Blood Walk (ISBN 0-9658345-0-6, 1997)

Brill and Maxwell

1. The Dopplegänger Gambit (ISBN 0-345-28267-1, 1979)
2. Spider Play (ISBN 0-445-20273-4, 1986)
3. Dragon's Teeth (ISBN 0-445-20906-2, 1990)

All three were published in omnibus form as Bridling Chaos (ISBN 0-9658345-3-0, 1998)

=== Other books ===
- A Voice out of Ramah (ISBN 0-345-28021-0, 1978)
- The Monitor, the Miners, and the Shree (ISBN 0-345-28456-9, 1980)
- Deadly Silents (ISBN 0-345-28780-0, 1981)
- Liberty's World (ISBN 0-88677-023-8, 1985)
- The Leopard's Daughter (ISBN 0-445-20522-9, 1987)
- Wilding Nights (ISBN 1-892065-70-3, 2002)
- Killer Karma (ISBN 1-59222-006-1, 2005)
- Ancient Enemy (ISBN 1-937105-43-1, 2013)

== Collections ==
- Aventine (ISBN 0-345-29521-8, 1982)

== Anthologies edited ==
- Seeds of Vision: A Fantasy Anthology (2000) (with Jonathan Fesmire)

== Personal life ==
She retired in January 2000 after 29 years of working as a veterinary radiographer at the Kansas State University College of Veterinary Medicine. Her husband, Pat, lost the use of his legs by 1983 and must use a wheelchair.
