= List of Theta Sigma Phi members =

Theta Sigma Phi (ΘΣΦ) was an American honor society for women in journalism. It was established in 1909 at the University of Washington in Seattle, Washington. In 1972, it was renamed Women in Communications, Inc. In 1996, the organization was dissolved. The nonprofit Association for Women in Communications, a professional organization for women in the communications industry, was formed in 1996 to carry forward the mission of Theta Sigma Phi.

== Notable members ==
Following are some of the notable members of Theta Sigma Phi and Women in Communications.

Name	Chapter	Notability	ΘΣΦ awards	Ref.
Patty Abramson		venture capitalist who co-founded the Women's Growth Capital Fund	Headliner Award 1985	
Shirley Abrahamson		Chief Justice of the Wisconsin Supreme Court	Headliner Award 1987	
Caroline Iverson Ackerman		aviation editor of Life during World War II and the first director of public relations for women for Shell Oil Company	Headliner Award 1949	
Donna Allen		feminist, civil rights activist, historian, economist, and founder of the Women's Institute for Freedom of the Press	Headliner Award 1979	
Madeline Amgott		television news producer	Headliner Award 1983	
Marie Anderson		women's editor for the Miami Herald	Headliner Award 1964	
Loreen Arbus		vice president-development of Viacom Productions; disability rights activist	Headliner Award 1984	
Jane Ardmore		novelist and biographer	Headliner Award 1968	
Marjorie Barrows	Chicago	magazine editor, book compiler, and author		
Bessie Beatty		War correspondent for the San Francisco Bulletin during World War I		
Joyce Beber		advertising executive who co-founded the Beber Silverstein Group	Headliner Award 1984	
Cathie Black		New York City Schools Chancellor, president and chair of Hearst Magazines, president and publisher of USA Today	Headliner Award 1984	
Myrna Blyth		editor-in-chief and publishing director of Ladies Home Journal; publishing director of Metropolitan Home	Headliner Award 1992	
Erma Bombeck		humorist and syndicated columnist	Headliner Award 1969	
Mary Hastings Bradley		explorer and writer		
Laura L. Brookman		editorial manager of the Ladies’ Home Journal	Headliner Award 1947	
Barbara Everitt Bryant		Director of the U.S. Census Bureau	Headliner Award 1980	
Christy C. Bulkeley		president and publisher of the Commercial-News, president and publisher of The Saratogian, and vice president-special corporate projects of Gannett Co. Inc.	Headliner Award 1978	
Pat Carbine		executive editor of Look, vice president and editor-in-chief of McCall's, co-founder and first editor-in-chief of Ms.	Headliner Award 1975	
Liz Carpenter		woman executive assistant to Vice President Lyndon Baines Johnson, press secretary for First Lady Lady Bird Johnson	Headliner Award 1962	
John Mack Carter		editor-in-chief of Good Housekeeping	Headliner Award 1978	
Marguerite Cartwright		journalist, sociologist, educator, and actress, who served as a correspondent for the United Nations	Headliner Award 1975	
Martha Cheavens		Novelist	Headliner Award 1939	
Ruth Ellen Church		food and wine journalist, food editor for the Chicago Tribune	Headliner Award 1950	
Ruth Philpott Collins		Freelance writer and author of children's books	Headliner Award 1964	
Marion Corwell-Shertzer		public relations executive with Ford Motor Company,	Headliner Award 1969	
Margaret Cousins		managing editor of Good Housekeeping	Headliner Award 1946	
May Craig		war correspondent and journalist	Headliner Award 1952	
Charlotte Curtis		journalist, columnist, and editor at The New York Times	Headliner Award 1981	
Arlene Dahl		film actress, syndicated columnist	Headliner Award 1964	
Edith Deen		author of religious books	Headliner Award 1963	
Colleen Dishon		journalist for the Chicago Tribune	Headliner Award 1973	
Margaret Dixon		political journalist, managing editor of The Advocate	Headliner Award 1960	
Dorothy Ducas		reporter, editor, chief of Magazine Division for Jnited States Office of War Information; first woman to win a Pulitzer Traveling Scholarship	Headliner Award 1943	
Gladys Erickson		staff writer-reporter of Chicago's American; pioneer of prison and crime reporting	Headliner Award 1966	
Doris Fleeson		journalist and columnist; first woman in the U.S. to have a nationally syndicated political column	Headliner Award 1950	
Doris Fleischman		writer, public relations executive, and feminist activist	Headliner Award 1972	
Genevieve Foster		Author and illustrator of children's books	Headliner Award 1948	
Jo Foxworth		advertising executive	Headliner Award 1981	
Lenka Franulic		first Chilean woman journalist, winner of National Prize for Journalism (Chile)	Headliner Award 1958	
Pauline Frederick		author and journalist for newspapers, television, and radio	Headliner Award 1950	
Dorothy Fuldheim		journalist and news anchor at The Cleveland Press and WEWS-TV	Headliner Award 1967	
Bess Furman		reporter for The New York Times; White House correspondent	Headliner Award 1949	
Hazel Garland		journalist, columnist, and newspaper editor; first African-American woman to serve as editor-in-chief of a nationally circulated newspaper chain	Headliner Award 1975	
Phyllis T. Garland		music critic and editor for Ebony Magazine; first female member of faculty to earn tenure at the Columbia University Graduate School of Journalism	Headliner Award 1971	
Georgie Anne Geyer		foreign correspondent for the Chicago Daily News and a syndicated columnist for Universal Press Syndicate	Headliner Award 1968	
Beatrice Blackmar Gould		playwright, founding -editor of Ladies' Home Journal from 1935 through 1962	Headliner Award 1940	
Katharine Graham		publisher of The Washington Post	Headliner Award 1969	
Denny Griswold		founder and editor of Public Relations News	Headliner Award 1975	
Fran Harris		newscaster; the first female newscaster in Michigan	Headliner Award 1952	
Heloise		syndicated newspaper advice columnist	Headliner Award 1994	
Genevieve Forbes Herrick	Pi	journalist for the Chicago Tribune		
Lenore Hershey		editor-in-chief of Ladies Home Journal	Headliner Award 1977	
Marguerite Higgins		reporter with the New York Herald Tribune, war correspondent, syndicated columnist for Newsday, and the first woman to win a Pulitzer Prize for Foreign Correspondence	Headliner Award 1951	
Kathleen Hite		writer for radio and television	Headliner Award 1964	
Henriette Horak		publiity director, Women's Army Corps, European Theater	Headliner Award 1946	
Barbara Way Hunter		co-owner and president of Dudley-Anderson-Yutzy, the first major public relations firm in New York City to be owned and managed by women	Headliner Award 1984	
Eleanor Murdoch Johnson		founder and editor of chief of My Weekly Reader from 1935 to 1961	Headliner Award 1948	
Clara Ingram Judson		author of books for children	Headliner Award 1948	
Dorothy Misener Jurney		journalist and women's page editor for the Miami Herald	Headliner Award 1956	
Irma Kalish		television producer and screenwriter, known for Too Close for Comfort, All in the Family, The Facts of Life, Good Times, The Hogan Family, Maude, I Dream of Jeannie, F Troop, and Family Affair	Headliner Award 1978	
Alice Keith		pianist, founder of the National Academy of Broadcasting, and director of CBS Radio's The American School of the Air.	Headliner Award 1944	
Marilyn Moats Kennedy		teacher and administrator at DePaul University, job strategies editor for Glamour	Headliner Award 1986	
Julilly House Kohler		writer of books for children	Headliner Award 1944	
Gini Laurie		leader of the independent living movement for people with disabilities	Headliner Award 1987	
Ann Liguori		sports radio and television personality, talk show host		
Malvina Lindsay		editor and columnist at The Washington Post	Headliner Award 1945	
Kate Rand Lloyd		editor-in-chief of Working Woman	Headliner Award 1983	
Mary Margaret McBride		CBS Radio interview host and writer, called "the First Lady of Radio".	Headliner Award 1940	
Sarah McClendon		White House reporter	Headliner Award 1971	
Lucille Saunders McDonald		journalist, historian, and author of children's books	Headliner Award 1959	
Daphne Alloway McVicker		short story writer	Headliner Award 1940	
Lois Seyster Montross		Author, novelist	Headliner Award 1939	
Allen Neuharth		founder of USA Today, The Freedom Forum, and its Newseum	Headliner Award 1977	
Andre Norton		science fiction and fantasy writer	Headliner Award 1963	
Bonaro W. Overstreet		author, poet, and lecturer	Headliner Award 1957	
Clementine Paddleford		food writer and editor with the New York Herald Tribune, the New York Sun, The New York Telegram, Farm and Fireside, and This Week	Headliner Award 1943	
Eugene Patterson		managing editor of The Washington Post; editor of the St. Petersburg Times; awarded the 1967 Pulitzer Prize for Editorial Writing;	Headliner Award 1982	
Marjorie Paxson		newspaper journalist, editor, and publisher of the Arizona Republic and the Phoenix Gazette	Headliner Award 1976	
Mike Peters		Pulitzer Prize-winning editorial cartoonist and the creator of the comic strip Mother Goose and Grimm	Headliner Award 1983	
Ponchitta Pierce		journalist, television host, and producer	Headliner Award 1970	
Jeanine Pirro		television host, judge, and attorney	Headliner Award 1996	
Kirk Polking		editor of Writer’s Digest	Headliner Award 1970	
Sylvia Porter		economist and syndicated daily newspaper columnist	Headliner Award 1981	
Barbara Gardner Proctor		first African American woman to own and operate an advertising agency	Headliner Award 1978	
Madelyn Pugh		television writer, known for her work on the I Love Lucy	Headliner Award 1953	
Nina Mason Pulliam		journalist, author, and newspaper executive; publisher of	Headliner Award 1954	
John C. Quinn		editor of USA Today; vice president of Gannett Co., and president of Gannet News Service	Headliner Award 1986	
Paige Rense		editor-in-chief of Architectural Digest, Bon Appétit, and GEO	Headliner Award 1983	
Barbara Leonard Reynolds		author, poet, and reporter for the Chicago Daily Tribune	Headliner Award 1976	
Inez Robb		journalist and war correspondent for the International News Service	Headliner Award 1943	
Alice Rohe		War correspondent for United Press International during World War I		
Richard S. Salant		President of the CBS News	Headliner Award 1980	
Marlene Sanders		news correspondent, anchor, producer, and executive or ABC News and moved to CBS News	Headliner Award 1971	
Mari Sandoz		novelist, biographer, and lecturer	Headliner Award 1957	
Jean Way Schoonover		co-owner and board chair of Dudley-Anderson-Yutzy, the first major public relations firm in New York City to be owned and managed by women	Headliner Award 1984	
Sigrid Schultz		War correspondent for the Chicago Tribune during World War I		
Shirley Seifert		historical fiction author	Headliner Award 1965	
Gail Sheehy		author, journalist, and lecturer		
Barbara Sher		speaker, career and lifestyle coach, and author		
Bert Kruger Smith		writer, lecturer, and advocate on mental health and aging	Headliner Award 1966	
Hazel Brannon Smith		editor and publisher of four Mississippi weekly newspapers	Headliner Award 1962	
Mary-jane R. Snyder		president of Mj Enterprises, an international communications and public relations consulting firm; one of the founders of the Organization of Women (NOW)	Headliner Award 1979	
Thelma Strabel		Author, novelist	Headliner Award 1939	
Isabella Taves		author and syndicated columnist	Headliner Award 1974	
Helen Thomas		reporter, author, and a long-serving member of the White House press corps	Headliner Award 1972	
Marion Spitzer Thompson		author, screenwriter for 20th Century Fox	Headliner Award 1944	
Elizabeth Borton de Trevino		author, novelist, and recipient of the Newbery Medal	Headliner Award 1967	
Esther Van Waggoner Tufty		journalist in radio and newspaper	Headliner Award 1966	
Agness Underwood		journalist and newspaper editor, city editor of the Los Angeles Herald-Express	Headliner Award 1949	
Judith C. Waller		broadcast radio personality and manager; director of public affairs and education for NBC Midwest	Headliner Award 1954	
Barbara Walters		broadcast journalist and television personality	Headliner Award 1993	
Eudora Welty		novelist	Headliner Award 1972	
Mary Alice Williams		pioneering journalist and broadcast executive who broke gender barriers by becoming the first female prime time network anchor; vice president of Cable News Network	Headliner Award 1986	
Lois Wille		Journalist, editor, and author who won a Pulitzer Prize for Public Service and Pulitzer Prize for Public Service	Headliner Award 1964	
Nancy Woodhull		senior editor of USA Today; president of Gannett News Media; editor-in-chief of Southern Progress Corporation	Headliner Award 1987	

== Honorary members ==
Following are some of the honorary members of Theta Sigma Phi and Women in Communications.

Name	Chapter	Notability	ΘΣΦ awards	Ref.
Helen Archdale	Kansas City Alumna	Scottish feminist, suffragette and journalist.		
Gertrude Atherton	Alpha Alpha	American writer.		
Temple Bailey	Gamma	novelist and short story writer		
Margaret Culkin Banning	Twin Cities Alumna	best-selling American writer of thirty-six novels and an early advocate of women's rights.		
Nalbro Bartley	Iota	short story writer, newspaper columnist and lecturer		
Emily Newell Blair	Gamma	writer, suffragist, feminist, and a founder of the League of Women Voters		
Mary Hastings Bradley	Chicago Alumna	novelist		
Ida Clyde Clarke	Sigma	journalist, writer and suffragist		
Dorothy Dix	Alpha Kappa	newspaper columnist		
Edna Ferber	Beta	Pulitzer Prize winning novelist and playwright		
Dorothy Canfield Fisher	Eta	Educational reformer, social activist, and author		
Zona Gale	Beta	novelist, playwright, and the first woman to win the Pulitzer Prize for Drama		
Ruth Hale	Omega	American journalist who worked for women's rights in New York City		
Fannie Hurst	Psi	novelist and short-story writer		
Inez Haynes Irwin	Psi	feminist author, journalist, member of the National Woman's Party		
Florence Finch Kelly	Epsilon	feminist, suffragist, journalist, and author of novels and short stories		
Sophie Kerr	Psi	short story writer		
Frances Parkinson Keyes	Kansas City Alumna	American novelist, memoirist, biographer, wrote as about life as wife of U.S. Senator		
Rose Wilder Lane	Alpha Alpha	American writer and daughter of American writer Laura Ingalls Wilder.		
Edna St. Vincent Millay	Xi	lyrical poet and playwright		
Harriet Monroe	Beta	Poet and founding publisher and editor of Poetry magazine	Headliner Award 1975	
Aubertine Woodward Moore	Beta	musician, writer, musical critic, translator, and lecturer		
Kathleen Norris	Alpha Alpha	American novelist and newspaper columnist		
Mary Rose Oakar		Ohio House of Representatives and U.S. House of Representatives		
Rayna Prohme	Pi	journalist who covered the communist movement in China		
Cora Rigby	National Capital	head of the Washington News bureau for The Christian Science Monitor and founder and president of the Women's National Press Club	National Capital Alumna	
Mary Roberts Rinehart		mystery writer		
Eleanor Roosevelt	Columbus Alumna	First Lady of the United States, first chair of the Presidential Commission on the Status of Women, and first US Representative to the United Nations Commission on Human Rights		
Ellen Scripps	Phi	businesswoman and philanthropist		
Viola Brothers Shore	Tau	businesswoman and philanthropist		
Elsie Singmaster	Eta	author and Newbery Honor recipient		
Ruth Suckow	Alpha Delta	American novelist		
Sara Teasdale	Gamma	Lyric poet who won the 1917 Pulitzer Prize for Poetry		
Ida Tarbell	Alpha	Pioneering investigative journalist and one of the leading muckrakers of the Progressive Era		
Haryot Van Rensselaer Dey	Psi Associate	Frederick Van Rensselaer Dey's editor		
Ella Wheeler Wilcox	Beta	author and poet		
Honoré Willsie	Beta	novelist, short story writer, and magazine editor		
Anzia Yezierska	Eta	novelist specializing in depictions of Jewish-American life		
Ruth Comfort Mitchell Young	Iota	writer and playwright, best known for her novel, Of Human Kindness		

== See also ==
- List of Theta Sigma Phi chapters
