= Betty Fible Martin =

American writer

Betty (Fible) Martin (1907–1977) was an American journalist, writer, and Virginia farmer. Martin wrote farming-inspired feature stories and other articles for The New York Times and magazines.

== Early life and education ==
Martin was born in Shelbyville, Kentucky, on August 11, 1907. She attended elementary school in Chicago and graduated from the Beard School in Orange, New Jersey (now Morristown-Beard School) in 1925. Martin then completed her bachelor's degree at Barnard College in 1929. She planned to study law at Columbia University, but her father's serious illness cut short her graduate school plans.

== Writing career ==
Martin worked as a features writer for The New York Times and The New York Times Magazine for 12 years (1940–52). She penned articles for The Yale Review, Read Magazine (a children's magazine published by Weekly Reader), and Country Book Magazine. Martin also wrote articles that ran in IBM's Think magazine and The American Tradition.

While writing her articles, Martin ran a farm in Fairfax, Virginia, which she renovated from a previously dilapidated property. Themes from her farming activities and novelists Ellen Glasgow, Edith Wharton, Elizabeth Drexel, and Virginia Woolf influenced Martin's writing. The Kentucky Historical Society, a Kentucky state agency in Frankfort, Kentucky, houses Martin's papers and her uncle Micajah's. (Micajah Fible wrote for the Chicago Tribune). The collection preserves manuscripts for Martin's New York Times articles, her notebooks and diaries, and her application for the Daughters of the American Revolution. (The application contains supporting documents, including copies of wills, an 1819 indenture, and genealogical information.) The collection also includes letters between Micajah Fible and novelist John Fox, Jr.

In 1945, Martin penned an article for The New York Times Magazine that shared her observations of prisoners of war (POWs) laboring on a farm. Located near the Fairfax County Courthouse, the farm housed 158 POWs from World War II, including Austrians, Czechs, Germans, and Poles. The POWs worked a 12-hour-day that lasted from 7 am to 7 pm, and they served as dairymen, poultrymen, and general farmers. Describing the historical experiences of POWs in America, the 1976 book The Enemy among Us: World War II Prisoners of War referenced Martin's article. The 1978 book The Faustball Tunnel: German POWs in America and Their Great Escape also references her article.

== Spring Comes to the Farm ==
Martin's influential narrative "Spring Comes to the Farm" appeared in three anthologies. These anthologies included Farrar & Rinehart's Modern English Readings, Rinehart & Company's Readings in Biography & Exposition, and Holt, Rinehart and Winston's Readings in Exposition. An excerpt from "Spring Comes to the Farm" also appeared in D. Appleton-Century company's 1942 book As Others Hear You: A Textbook in Speech for High Schools.
