= American Education Press Building =

Former building in Columbus, Ohio

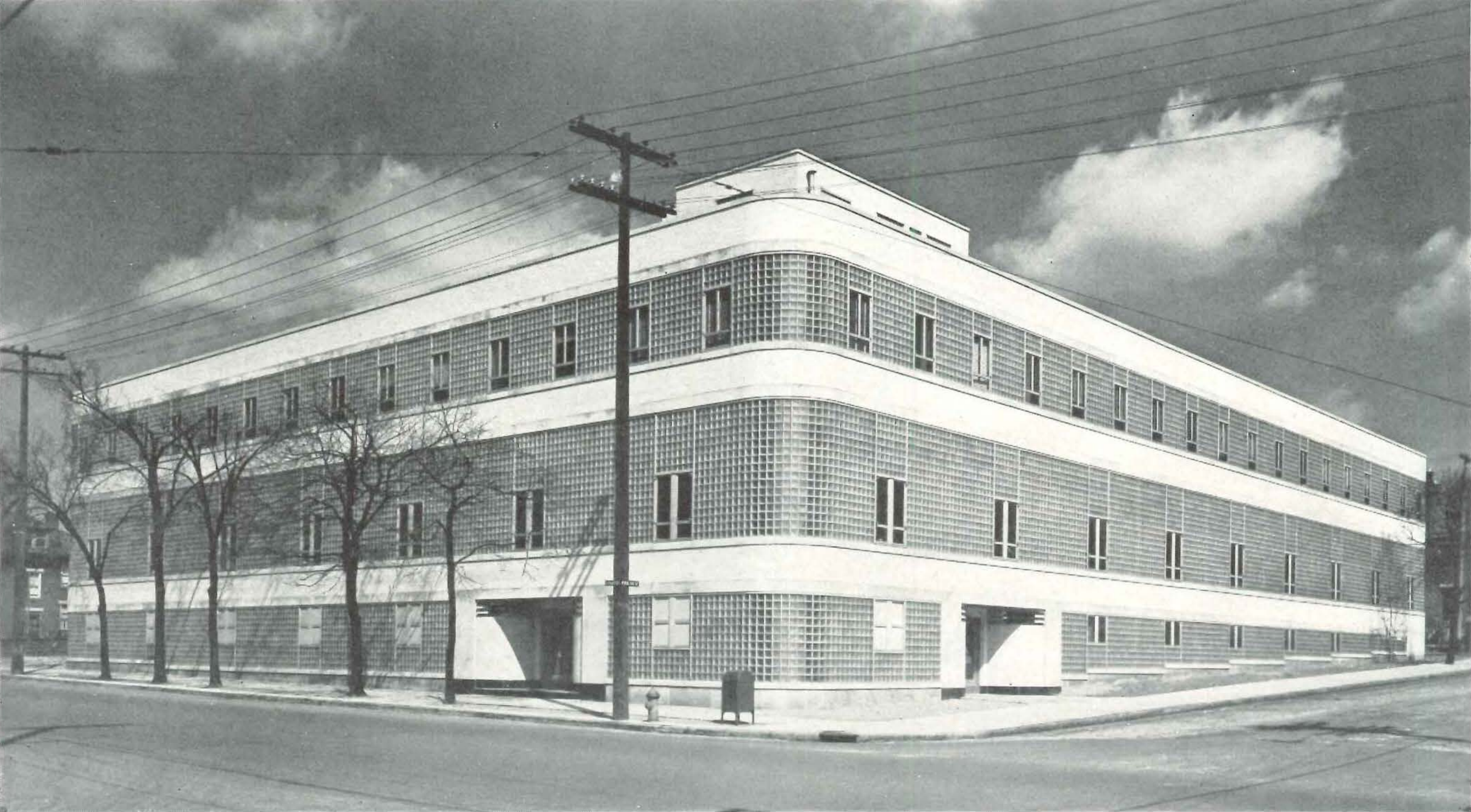
- The building c. 1937
- Interactive map of the American Education Press Building area

General information
- Architectural style: Streamline Moderne
- Location: 400 S. Front Street, Columbus, Ohio
- Coordinates: 39.953697°N 83.000249°W
- Construction started: 1936
- Opened: December 1936
- Demolished: c. 1986-1988
- Owner: American Education Press, later Franklin County

Technical details
- Floor count: 3
- Floor area: ~80,000 sq ft (7,400 m^{2})

Design and construction
- Architecture firm: Richards, McCarty & Bulford

The American Education Press Building was an office and industrial building in Downtown Columbus, Ohio. It was designed by Richards, McCarty & Bulford in the Streamline Moderne style, with rounded corners, a flat roof, and its exterior and interior walls predominantly made from glass blocks, a new innovation in the 1930s.

The building was constructed in 1936 for the American Education Press, and held publishing or printing offices from its completion until its demolition in the 1980s for additional county offices. The building had held county and state offices from the 1950s until its demolition year; toward the end of its life, the building tenants held complaints over space and maintenance issues, while architects and preservationists valued its unique design. The site now holds the 27-story Franklin County Courthouse, completed in 1991.

== Attributes ==
The American Education Press building was designed by the Columbus-based firm Richards, McCarty & Bulford in the Streamline Moderne style, and built by E. Elford & Son, also of Columbus. It had 70,000–80,000 square feet (6,500–7,400 m^{2}) among three stories, and was roughly square in shape, approximately 147.5 ft × 187.5 ft (45.0 m × 57.2 m).

=== Site and exterior ===
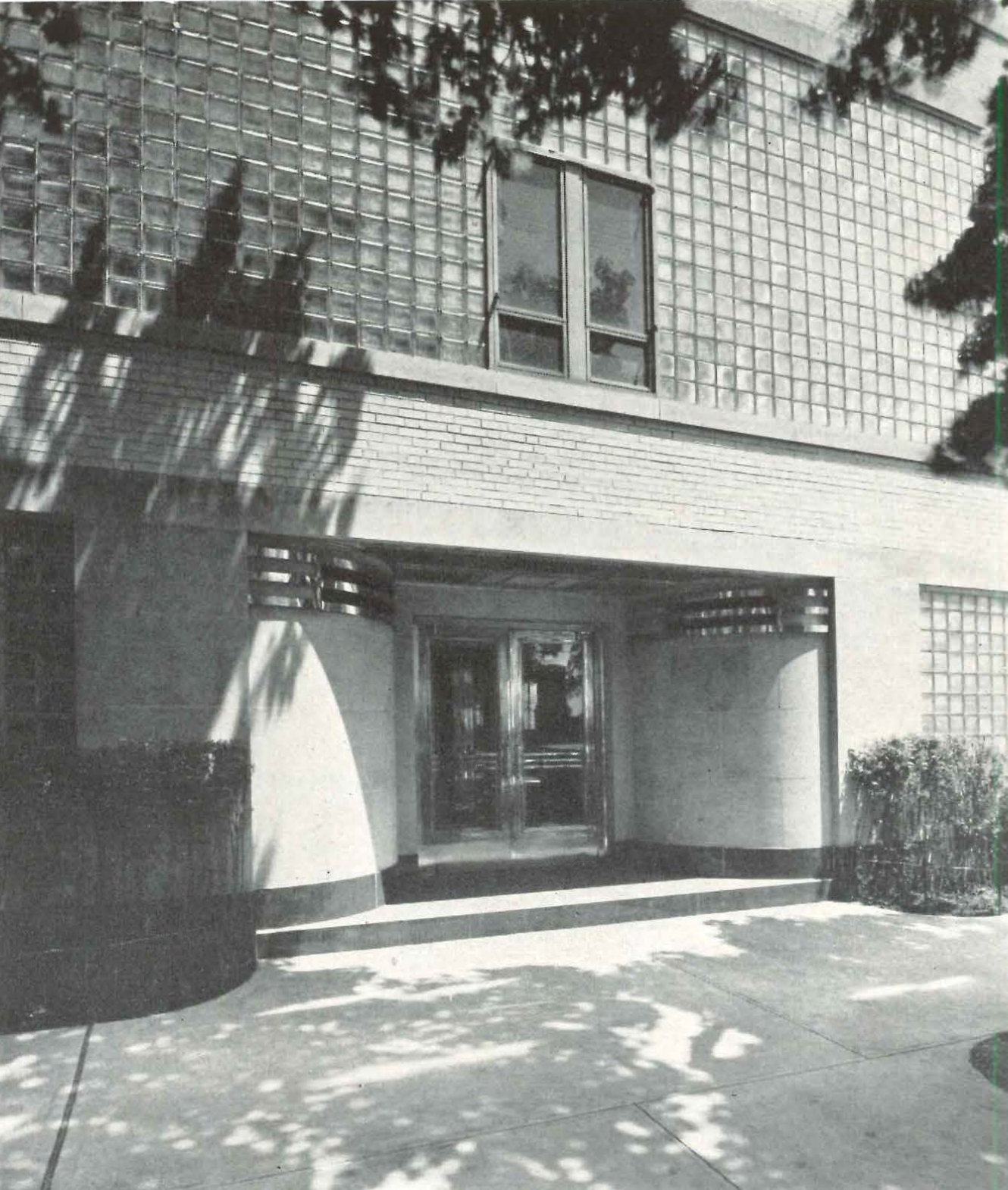
Entranceway

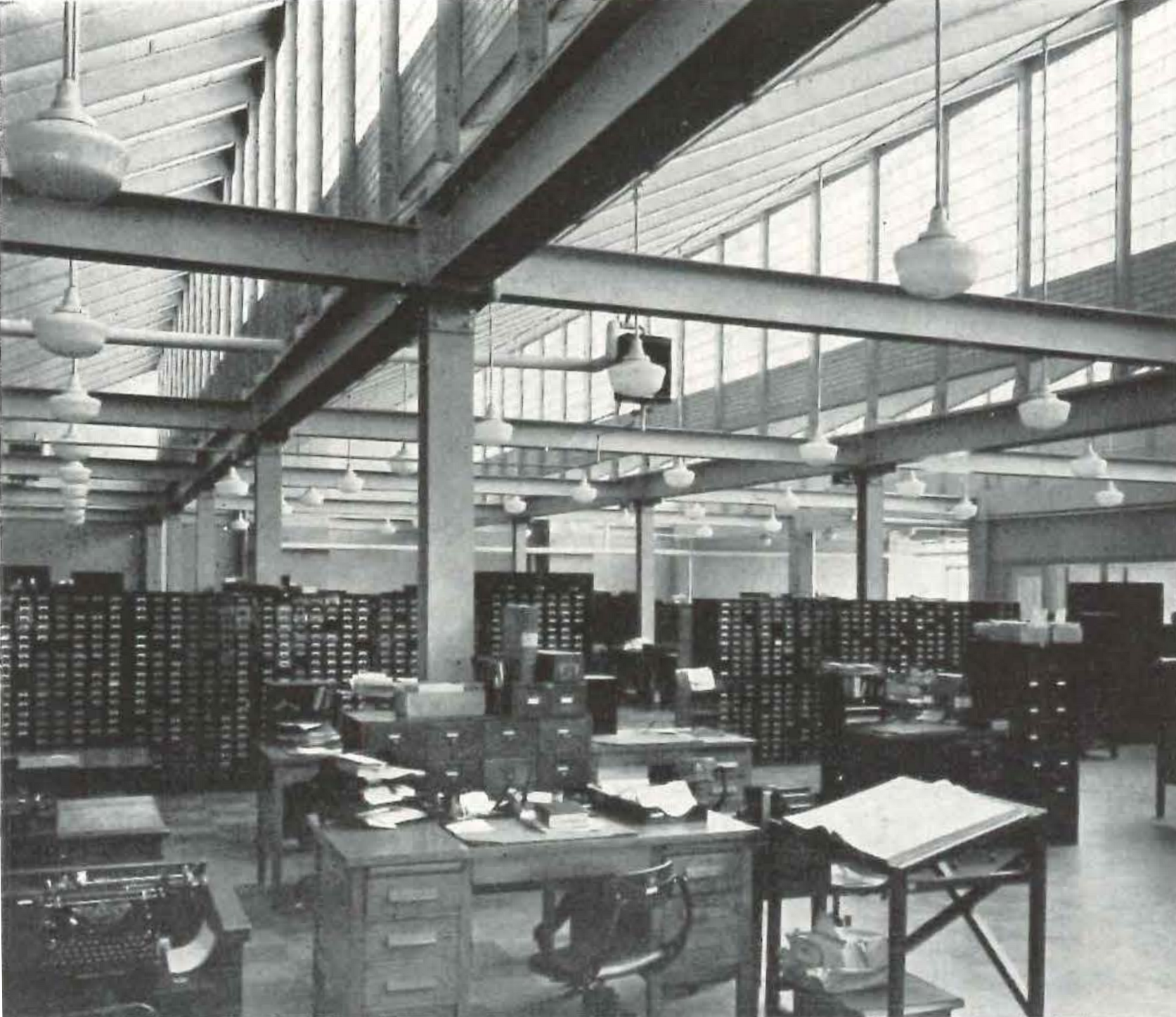
Skylit interior space

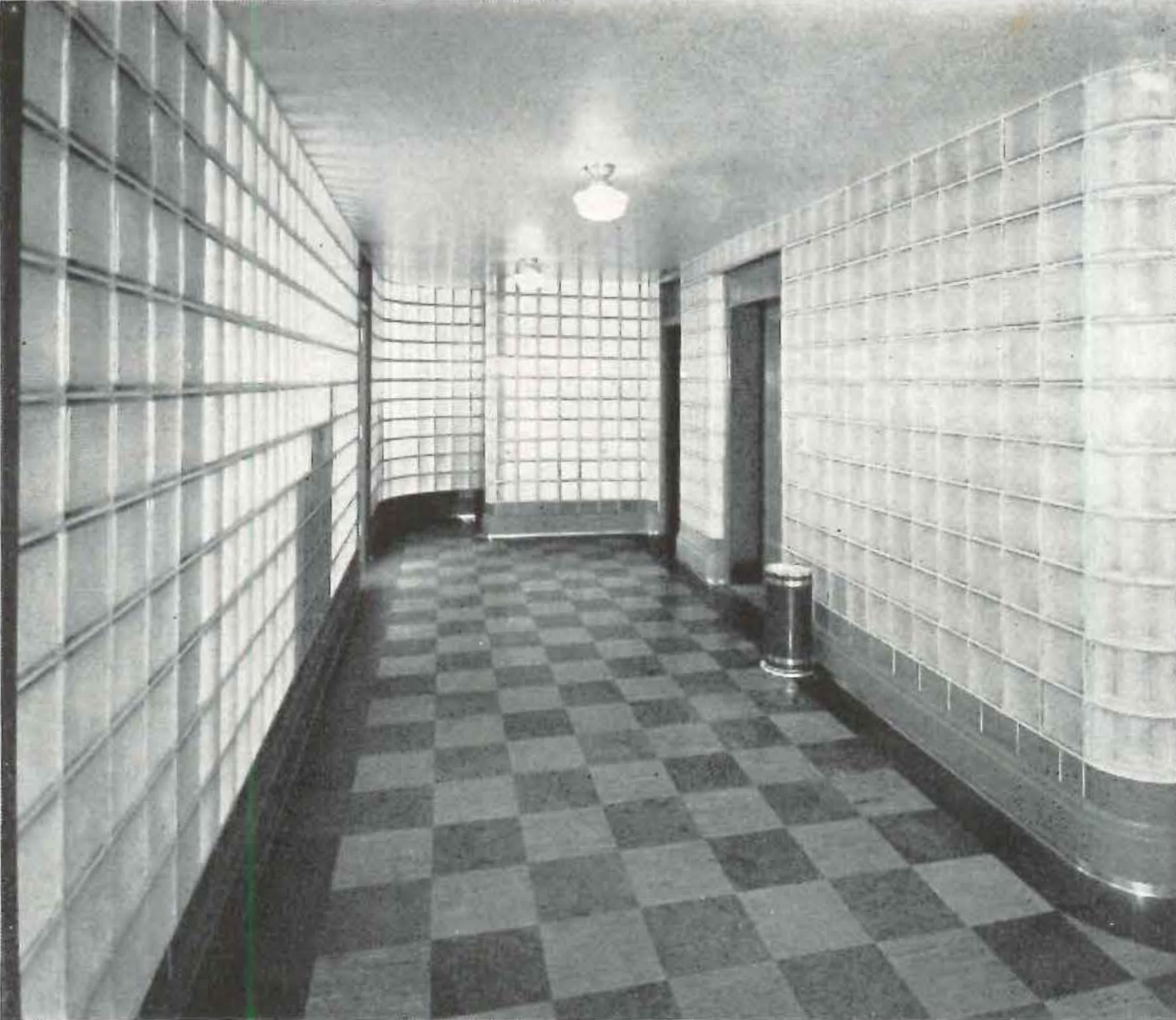
Glass block-walled interior hallway

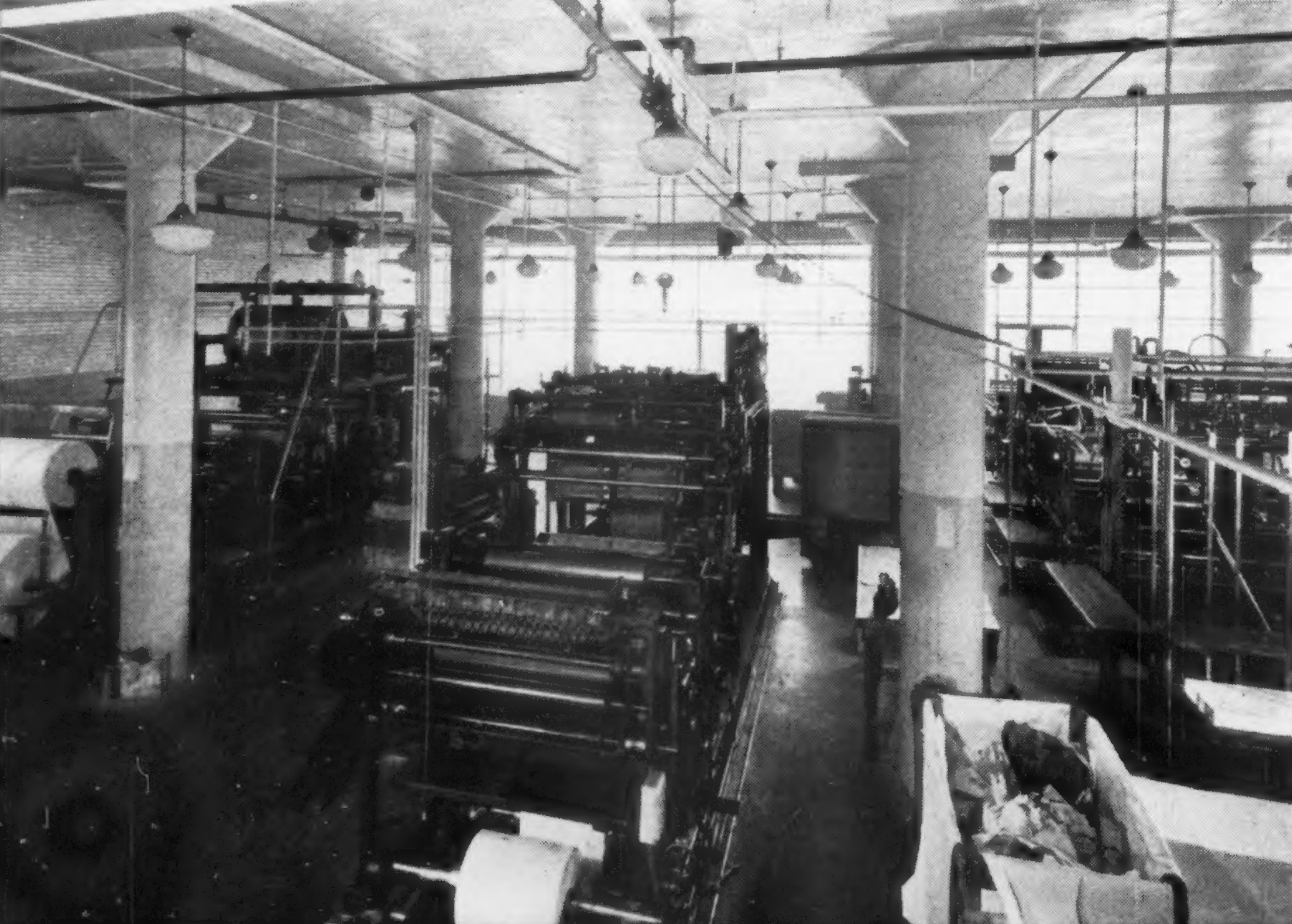
Section of the pressroom

The building was situated at the northeast corner of Front and Fulton streets in Downtown Columbus. Engler and Wall streets once made up the building's other boundaries, though they no longer extend to the block.

It had a concrete foundation, steel frame, and exterior walls consisting of uninterrupted alternating horizontal bands of light-colored Kittanning brick, Bedford limestone, and glass blocks. The exterior walls had smooth surfaces, with no protrusions. These features were made possible by setting the building's support columns away from the exterior wall, which was supported by a cantilevered section of the floor slab. The exterior wall's corners were rounded, as were the building's chimneys. The building's entrances also had rounded corners, and were recessed into the walls.

The building's flat roof was made of reinforced concrete, gypsum slabs, and large sawtooth skylights. The construction permitted the addition of a fourth floor in the future.

The building was designed to house the American Education Press, including 200 employees and their equipment and operations. It was made to handle the weight of heavy printing presses, making it sturdier than office buildings made later in the 20th century.

The building's novel architectural elements granted it features in the June and August 1937 issues of Architectural Record. The work was an extreme departure from architectural norms in the Midwest, and for the architecture firm.

==== Use of glass ====
The building included a significant use of glass brick, the newest building material of the time, for interior and exterior walls and skylights. These were translucent Insulux-brand blocks manufactured by Owens-Illinois, Inc., a Toledo, Ohio-based company. The material was chosen for its appearance and ability to diffuse light, giving a comfort and attractiveness to its occupants; it also carried a low maintenance cost, with cleaning not as urgent as with plain glass. The thickness and hollow interiors of the glass blocks created an insulating value comparable to a 13-inch brick wall. The company had a strong desire for the building to maximize daylight, with large window areas yet highly diffused light. The building became the most memorable for its use of glass block for Columbus residents of the time, and it was considered to be the first "all-glass" structure in the city.

=== Interior ===
As originally designed, the three-story building included lobbies, a mailing room, book storage, and utilities taking up most of the first floor, while the production departments (paper storage, the press room, and the composing room) took up almost all of the second floor. The third floor held editorial and business offices (private offices for executives and editors, the library, cut-file room, art department, and the circulation department). The private offices had windows onto Front and Fulton Streets, the art department was on the north side of the building, and the other spaces, making up most of the floor area, were lit by large skylights and glass block interior walls.

The building had heating units in many of its spaces, with the option for future air conditioning on the third floor. General Electric lamps were spaced throughout the building for supplemental lighting.

== History ==
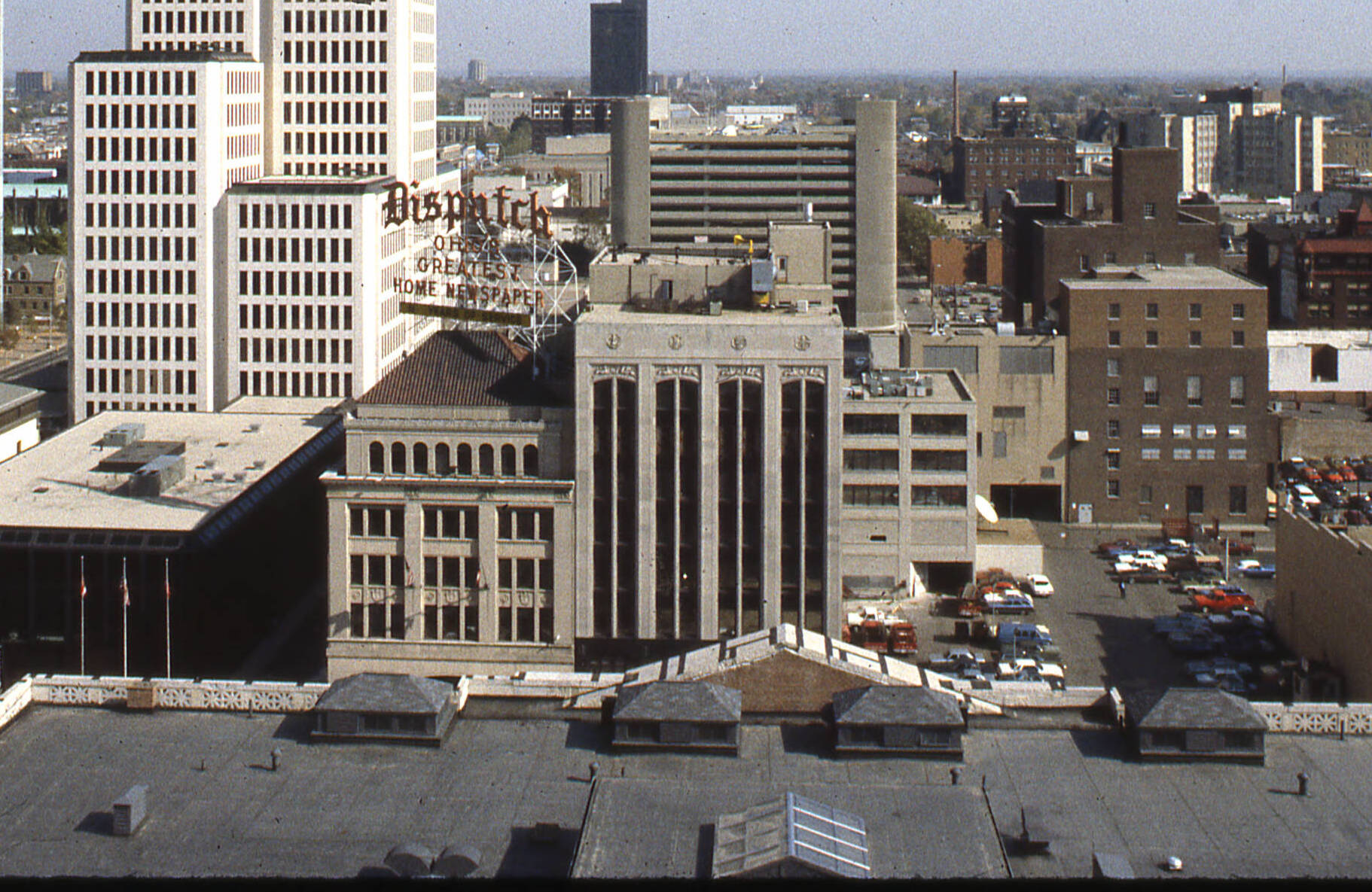
The former American Education Press building (center) on Capitol Square in 1982

The building was constructed for American Education Press, a printer and publisher of educational materials, known for the periodical Weekly Reader. Its construction allowed the company to move from another built for it in 1932. Both buildings were designed by Richards, McCarty & Bulford. The earlier building, at 40 S. Third St. on Capitol Square, had a restrained, classical design. It was demolished by S.G. Loewendick & Sons in the early 1990s for a 42-story skyscraper project that had its financing fall through.

The plans to construct the new building were announced in April 1936. The editorial offices and printers of American Education Press moved to the building in December of that year.

In 1949, American Education Press was purchased by Wesleyan University. The building became known as the Wesleyan Press Building, as the company became American Education Publications, a division of Wesleyan University Press.

The company used the building for several decades before it was converted for state and county office use. Franklin County had studied the potential for the building's use beginning in 1954.

The state leased 70,699 square feet in the building in 1960, including a sub-lease for 12,331 square feet for the Safety and Hygiene Division of the Industrial Commission. In 1961, the industrial commission moved out and the state's data processing center moved to the building; the center was shared by the highway and finance departments. The equipment there was made obsolete in 1974 by IBM-leased equipment located in the then-new Rhodes State Office Tower.

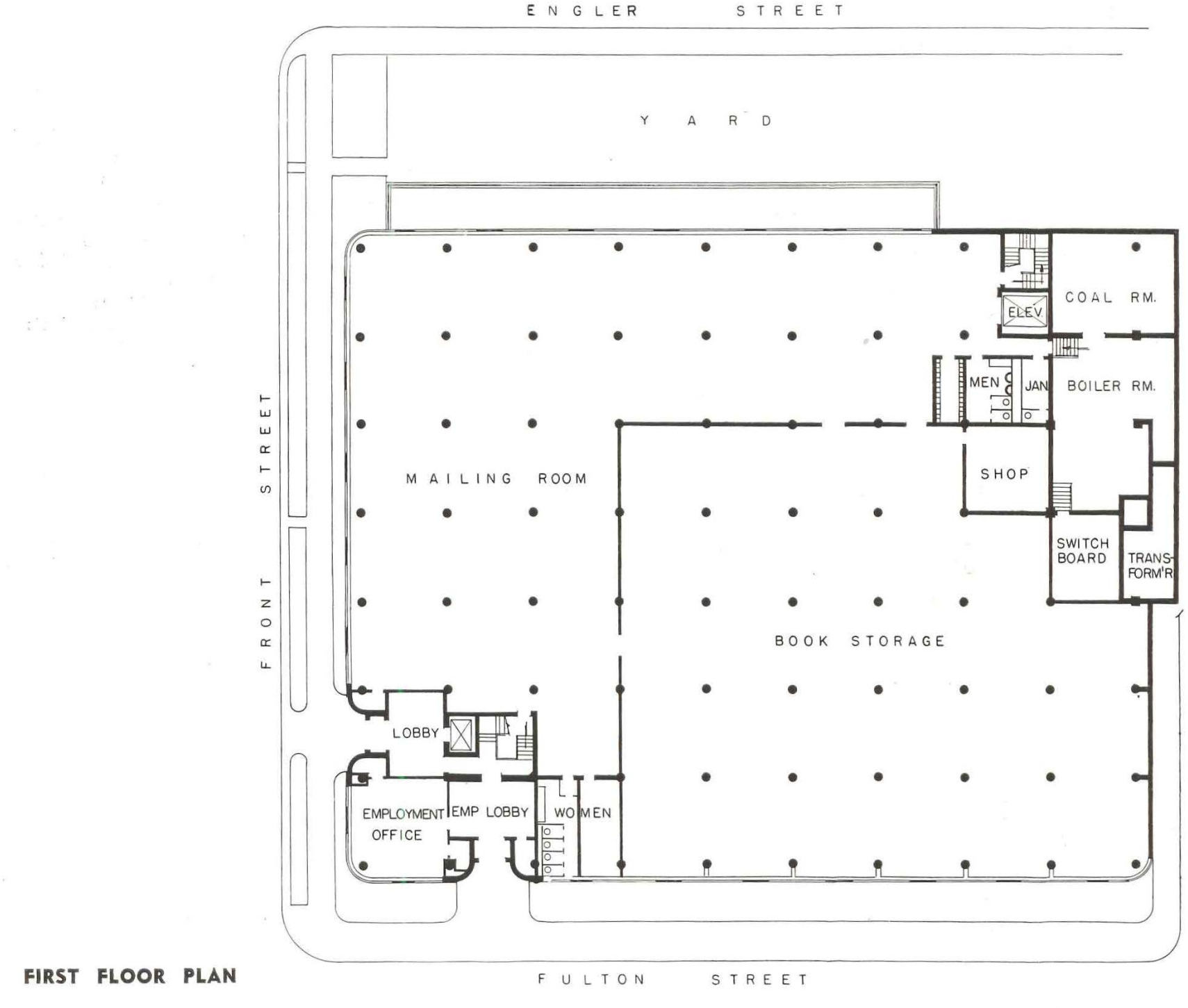
First floor layout

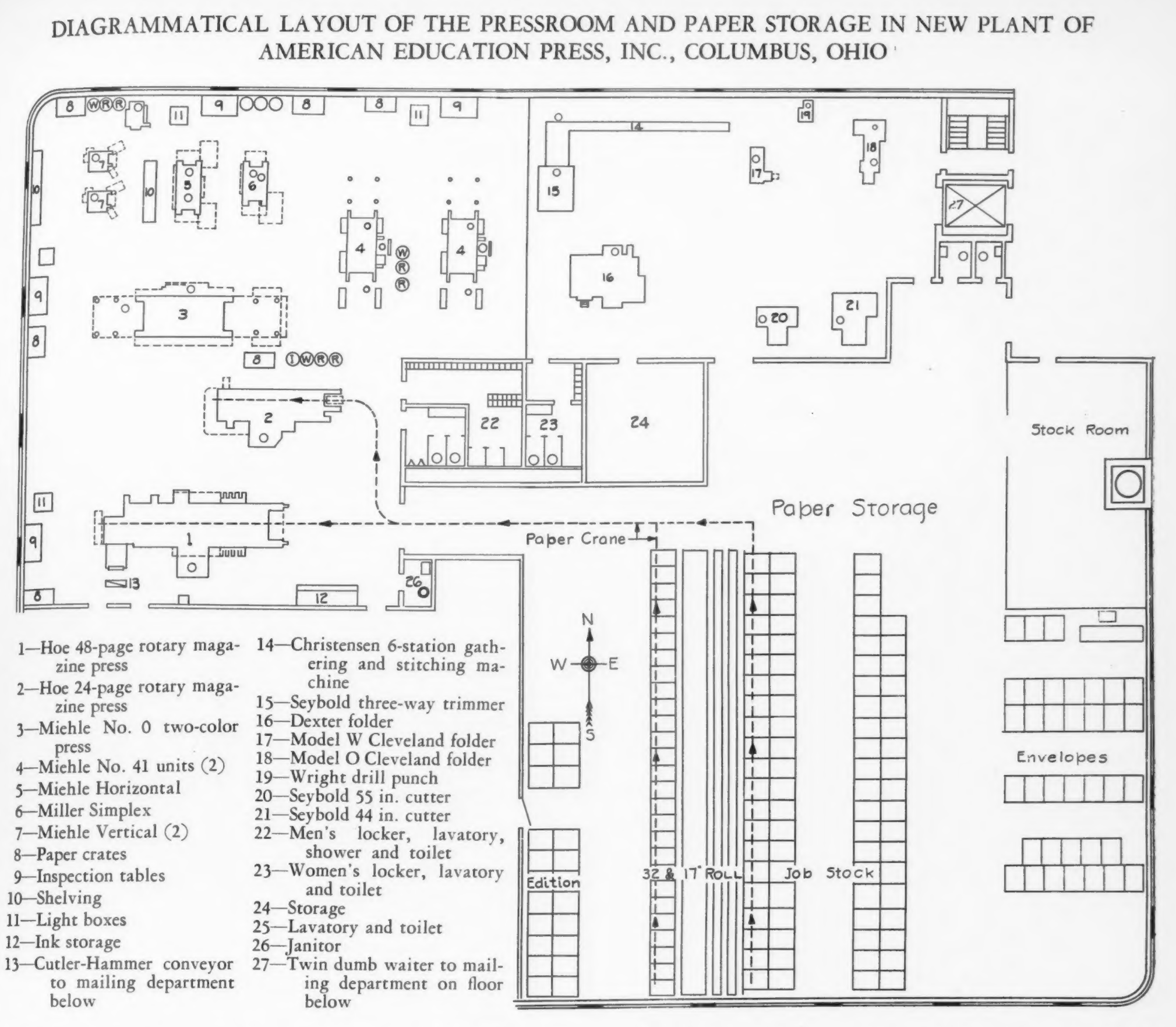
Second floor layout

In 1969, the county prepared to build the first phases of the Franklin County Government Center, predominantly in the block between Mound, High, Fulton, and Front Streets. It demolished all buildings on the block at this time except for the glass block building. The county would use the building, though it aimed to eventually demolish it – the master plan for the government center called for a parking garage on the site; one of two in the master plan as of 1975. The county hoped to move all of its offices to modern buildings by 1980.

By 1976, it was owned by the government of Franklin County. It was regarded by the Columbus AIA in 1976 as one of few extreme 1930s streamline modern buildings in American cities, and as an exceptional example of the style. The AIA chapter also stated the building was one of three similar buildings constructed at the same time, and the only one of the set standing at the time. It was supposedly always in use for printing or publishing; its last use for state offices also included printing services. The site became more prominent by the late 20th century, due to the construction of Columbus's innerbelt and Franklin County office buildings constructed surrounding the building.

In 1976, the building was still entirely as originally built, except for an entrance canopy and a flight of steps. By 1984, some of the glass blocks were being replaced by solid panels and stucco, even though block was reportedly just coming back into fashion. A local architect attested at the time that the building was "tremendously sound", as much as when it was built.

In the 1970s, the state leased space in the building for its printing operations, though it moved to a larger space in the Heer Building later on to consolidate offices, and to allow the county more space. In 1980, the Rickenbacker Port Authority opened an office in the building, which already housed the county office on aging, its public defender, and its CETA office, along with several others. By 1984, the building housed its domestic relations court, the Alliance for Cooperative Justice, the probation department, as well as the port authority and office on aging.

Despite its appreciation by architects and the Columbus Landmarks Foundation, building tenants began to dislike the structure, concerned about heating difficulties, broken or missing glass blocks, lack or inefficient use of space, and roof leaks. A local architect recommended renovating the building, potentially adding floors to double its square footage. Prindle, Patrick and Associates was hired to study overcrowding in the county's offices in 1984; the firm recommended a new $7.9 million court building to adequately house the county offices. The plan would demolish the American Education Press building.

The county decided to tear down the building in the 1980s; it was torn down between 1986 and 1988. The site currently holds the Franklin County Government Center's 27-story Franklin County Courthouse.

The building's original drawings are kept by the Ohio History Connection, which received them along with 54 other projects' documents in 1985.

=== Gallery ===
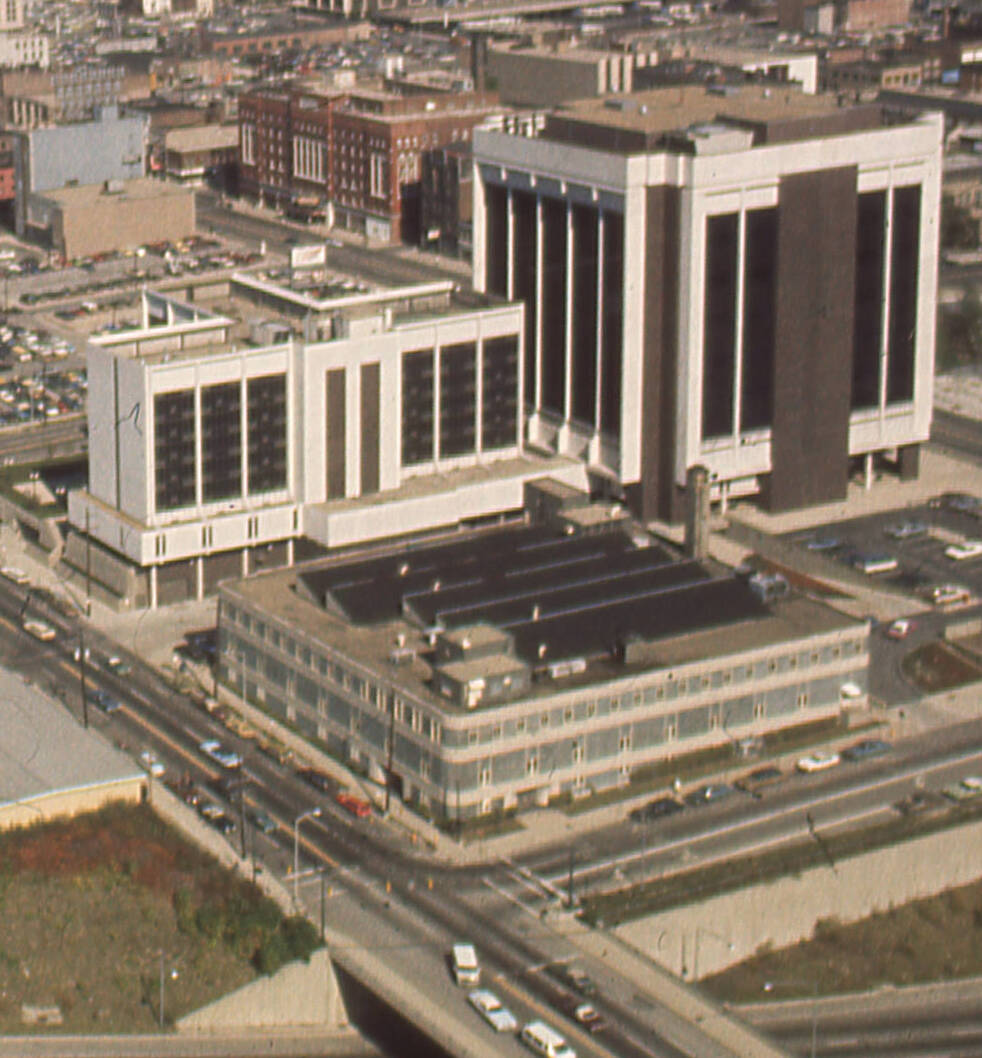
c. 1976

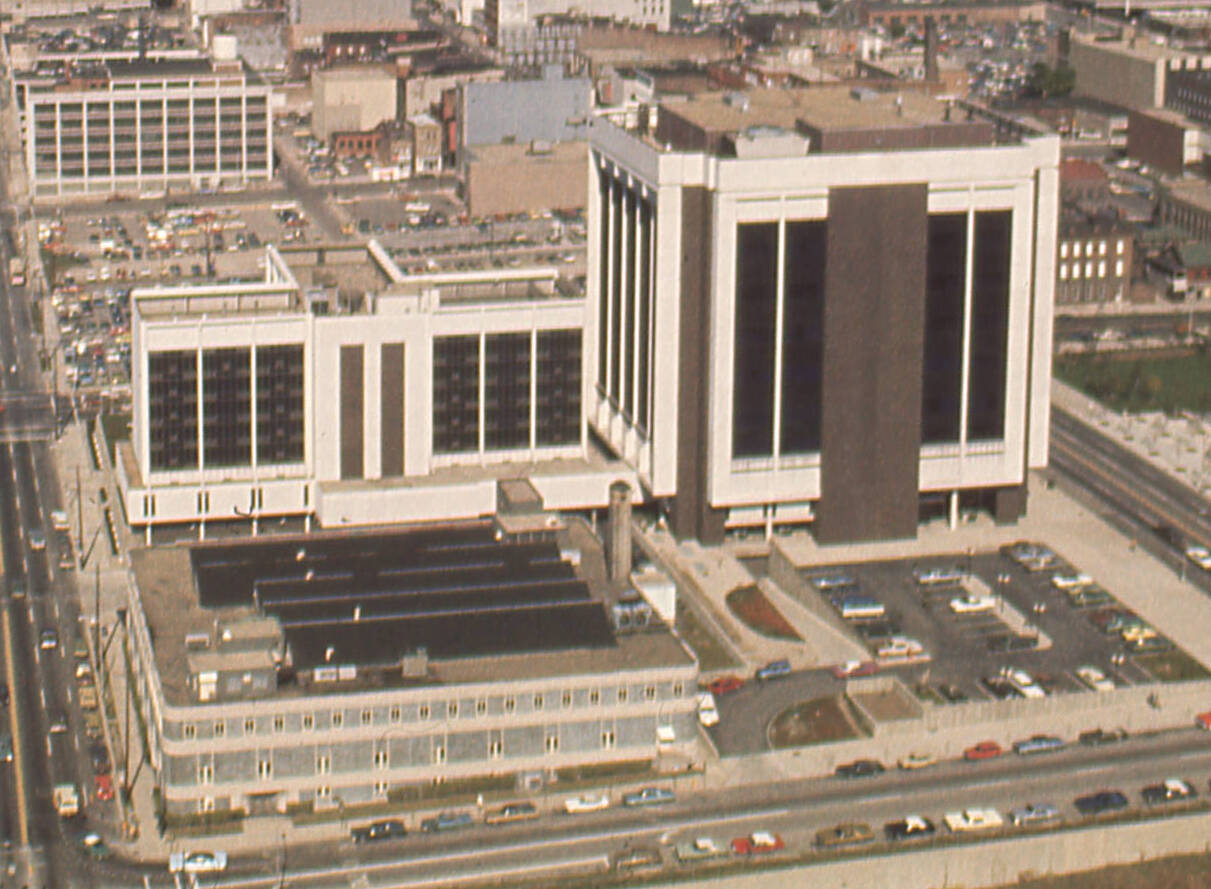
c. 1976

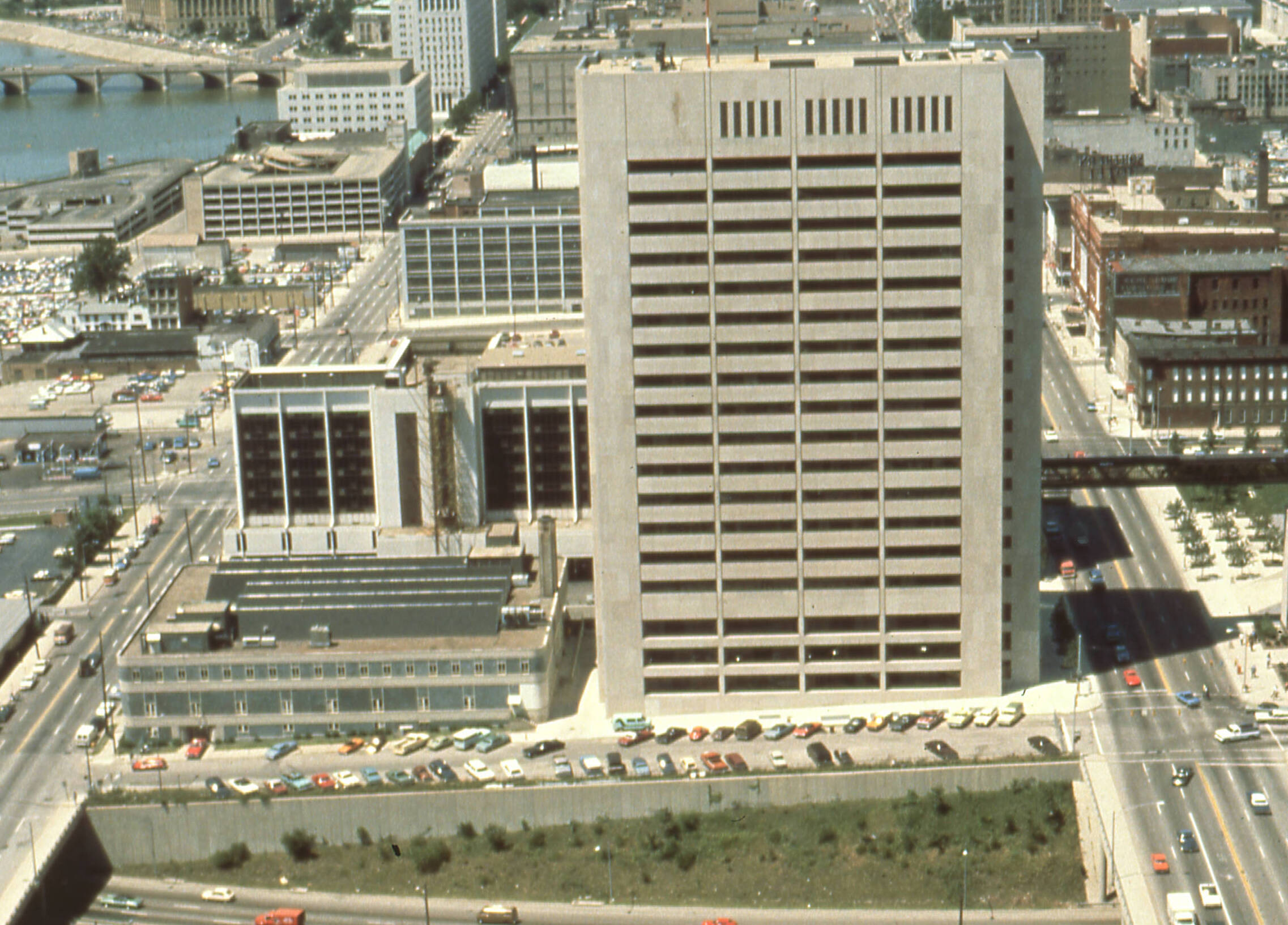
In 1980

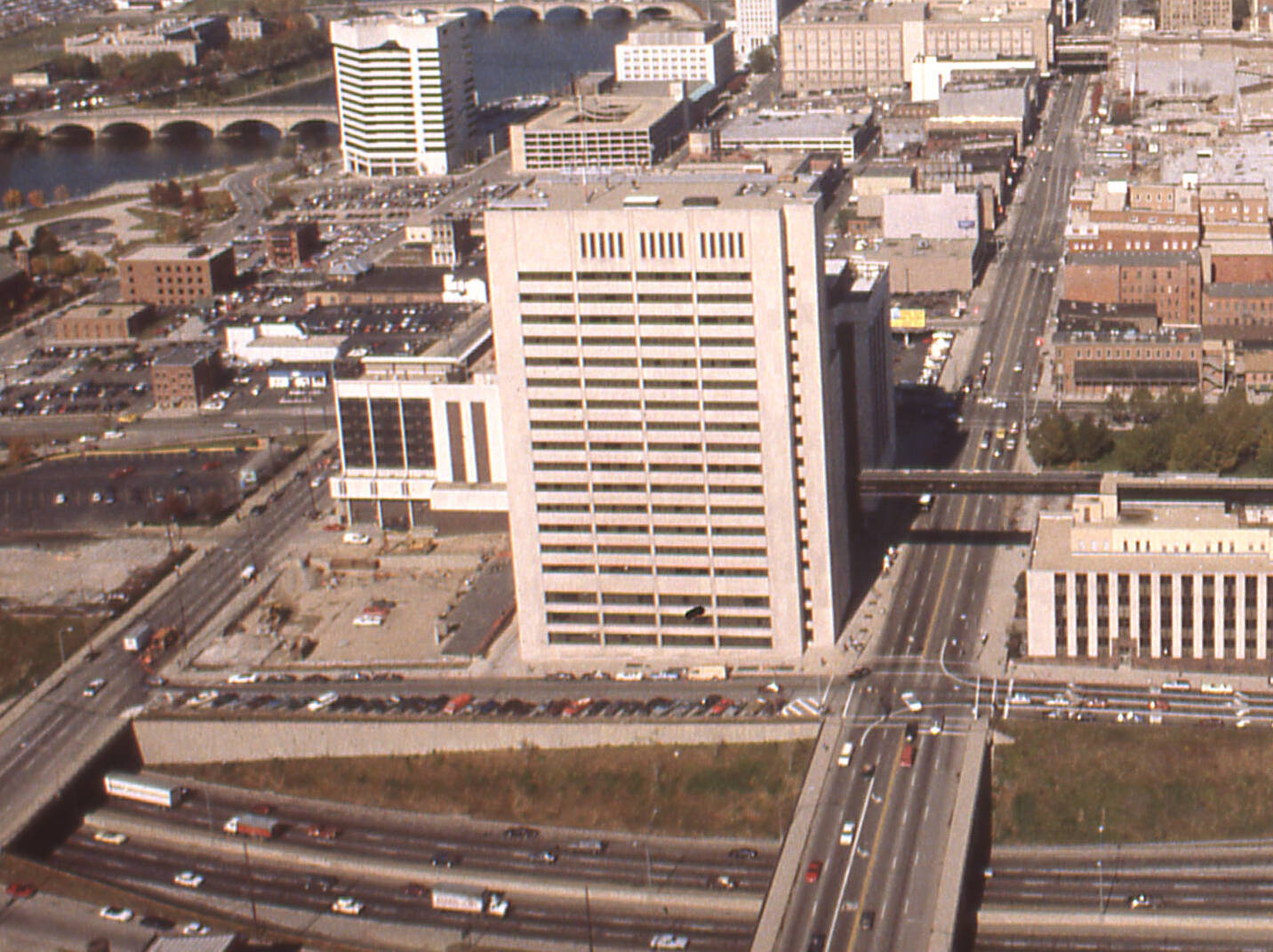
In 1988; demolished

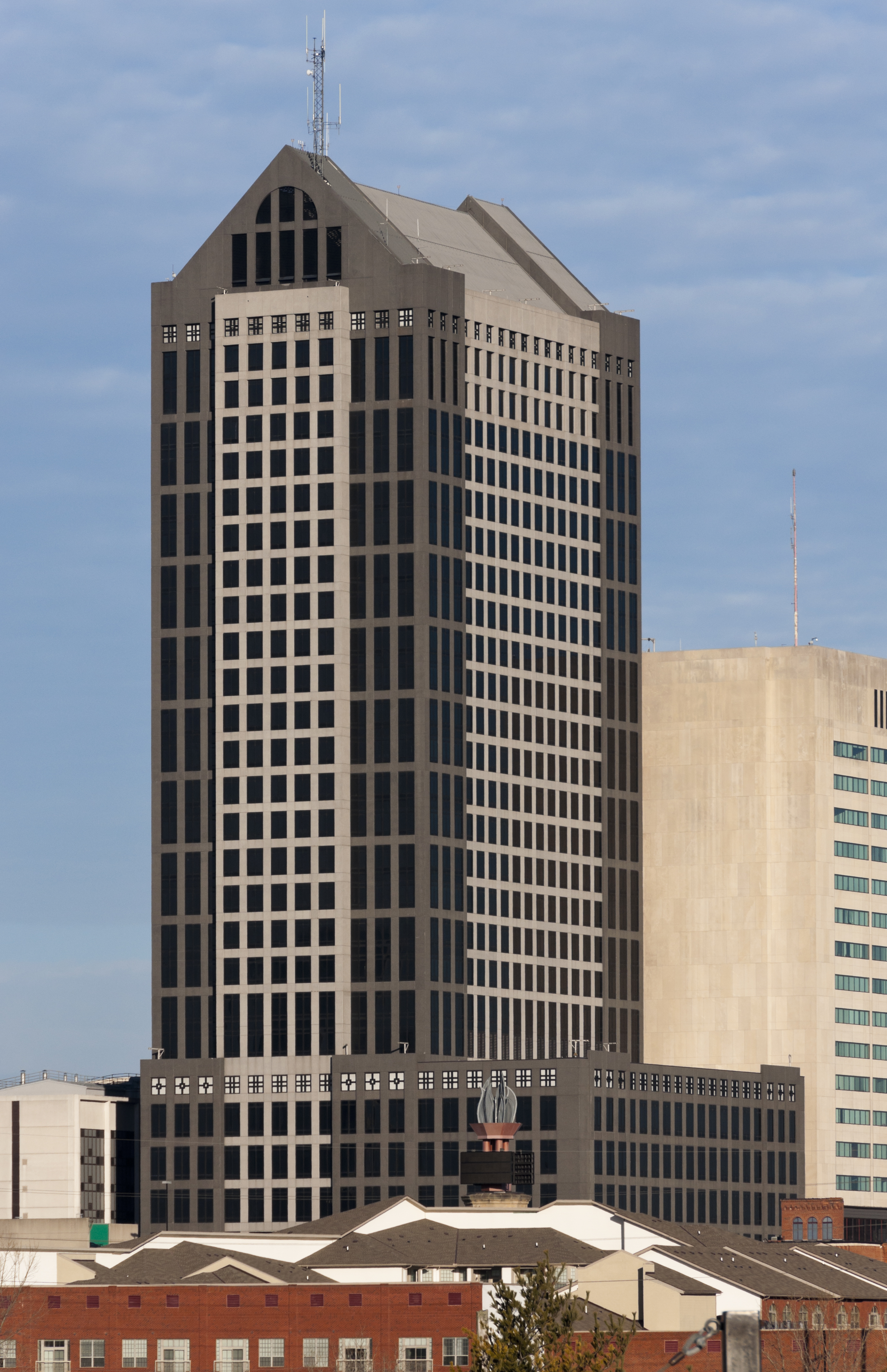
Building on-site since 1991

== See also ==
- List of Art Deco architecture in the United States
- List of demolished buildings and structures in Columbus, Ohio
