= Eleanor Johnson =

Eleanor Johnson may refer to:

- Eleanor Ileen Johnson (1910–1998), American telephone operator and Titanic survivor
- Eleanor Murdoch Johnson (1892–1987), American educator and editor
