= The Daily Northwestern =

Student newspaper at the Northwestern University

- Type: Student newspaper
- Format: Tabloid
- School: Northwestern University
- Owner: Students Publishing Company
- Founded: 1881; 145 years ago
- Headquarters: Evanston, Illinois
- ISSN: 1523-5033
- Website: www.dailynorthwestern.com

The Daily Northwestern is the student newspaper at Northwestern University which is published in print on Wednesdays and online daily during the academic year. Founded in 1881, and printed in Evanston, Illinois, it is staffed primarily by undergraduates, many of whom are students at Northwestern's Medill School of Journalism.

The Daily has won the Columbia Scholastic Press Association, Associated Collegiate Press Pacemaker Awards and awards from the Illinois College Press Association.

It is owned by Students Publishing Company, which also publishes Syllabus, the university yearbook. Current circulation is in excess of 7,500. The Daily Northwestern is the only daily for both Northwestern and Evanston.

The paper's offices are located on the third floor of Norris University Center on Northwestern's Evanston Campus.

In 2015, The Daily launched "The Campaign for the Future of The Daily Northwestern," a five-year fundraising campaign.

== Early history ==
The Daily descends from two earlier publications, the Tripod and Vidette, the older of which began publishing in 1871. In 1881, in what is considered The Daily's founding moment, the two papers merged to become The Northwestern, which would only gradually shed its literary-journal roots. Publication increased to five days a week by 1910. Independence from the university followed in 1923.

Future Chicago Tribune reporter Genevieve Forbes Herrick (graduated 1916) was the first female editor-in-chief of The Daily Northwestern.

== Notable alumni of The Daily Northwestern ==
- J.A. Adande - ESPN.com sports columnist
- Michael Jon Anderson - former editor, New York Times Book Review
- Kim Barker - ProPublica, author of "The Taliban Shuffle"
- Geraldine Baum - New York Bureau Chief for the Los Angeles Times and Pulitzer Prize winner
- Saul Bellow (published first short story in The Daily) - Nobel Prize-winning novelist
- Stephan Benzkofer - Chicago Tribune news editor
- Christine Brennan - USA Today sports columnist
- Elisabeth Bumiller - New York Times White House correspondent
- Rance Crain - president of Crain Communications Inc.
- Lester Crystal - retired executive producer, News Hour with Jim Lehrer
- R. Bruce Dold - Pulitzer Prize-winning editorialist, Chicago Tribune
- John J. Edwards III - Wall Street Journal deputy business editor
- Jonathan Eig - journalist and author
- David T. Friendly - film producer and Academy Award nominee
- Al From - Democratic Leadership Council CEO
- Jack W. Fuller - former Tribune Co. president and Pulitzer Prize winner
- Georgie Anne Geyer - editor, foreign correspondent, Chicago Daily News, L.A. Times
- Bob Greene - former columnist, Chicago Tribune; author
- Donal Henahan - Pulitzer Prize winner for music criticism
- Adam Horvath -- Wall Street Journal world news editor
- Stephen Hunter - Pulitzer Prize-winning film critic, Washington Post
- Maura Johnston - Music editor, Village Voice
- Jonathan M. Katz - author, former Associated Press correspondent
- Walter Kerr - Famed Pulitzer Prize-winning theater critic for the New York Times, namesake of a Broadway theater
- Vincent Laforet - Pulitzer Prize-winning photographer
- Robert Leighton - The New Yorker cartoonist
- Kerry Luft -- Chicago Tribune senior editor
- Jeffrey R. Lyon - Pulitzer Prize for Explanatory Reporting
- Edgar May - Pulitzer Prize winner for Local Reporting, served in the Vermont House of Representatives and Senate
- Garry Marshall - director, producer, famous for Happy Days, Laverne & Shirley, and Mork and Mindy.
- Robert E. Mulholland - former president, National Broadcasting Company
- Brent Musburger - ABC sportscaster
- John Musker - writer and director of Disney's The Little Mermaid and Aladdin
- Charles F. Neubauer - Pulitzer Prize winner (shared), LA Times reporter
- Bill Ostendorf - founder of Creative Circle Media Solutions, media trainer and software innovator
- Ralph Otwell - former Chicago Sun-Times editor
- Susan Page - USA Today White House correspondent
- Tom Philp - Pulitzer Prize winner
- Jim Puzzanghera - Boston Globe national politics reporter
- Daniel Roth - Conde Nast business writer, formerly of Fortune magazine
- Sidney Sheldon - novelist
- Richard Stolley - founding editor of People magazine
- Cheryl Lu-Lien Tan - author and journalist
- Steven Twomey - Pulitzer Prize winner for Feature Writing
- John Walter - former Atlanta Journal-Constitution executive editor
- David Weigel - Washington Post journalist
- Beth Whitehouse - Pulitzer Prize winner for Spot News Coverage (shared), author of The Match: "Savior Siblings" and One Family's Battle to Heal Their Daughter
- Michael Wilbon - Washington Post sports columnist and host of Pardon the Interruption
- Lois Wille - Pulitzer Prize winner for Editorial Writing, Chicago Tribune
