= Herbert Edwin Bradley =

American big-game hunter and zoo director

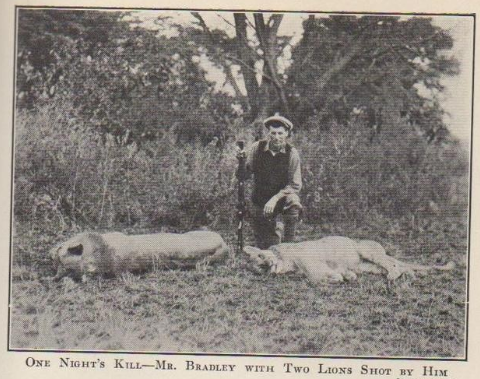
- Herbert Bradley with two lions he shot on the 1921–22 American Museum of Natural History expedition to the Belgian Congo
- Born: December 20, 1871; Brooklin, Ontario
- Died: April 22, 1961 (aged 89); Chicago
- Occupations: Lawyer, real estate investor and zoo director
- Spouse: Mary Hastings Bradley (m. 1910)
- Children: Alice Bradley Sheldon

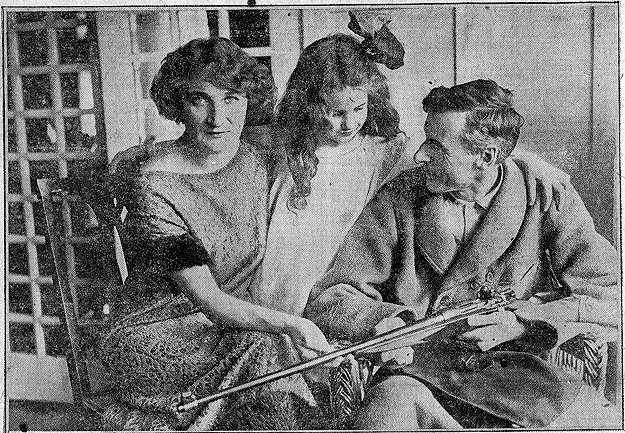
With family 1924

Herbert Edwin Bradley (December 20, 1871 – April 22, 1961) was a Canadian-born American lawyer, real estate investor, big-game hunter and zoo director. Born to a farmer in Brooklin, Ontario, Bradley graduated from the University of Michigan and the Northwestern University Pritzker School of Law. Bradley practiced in the field of mining law before becoming involved in real estate investment in Chicago. He married Mary Hastings Bradley in 1910, and their daughter, Alice Bradley Sheldon, was born in 1915. Bradley took his family to the Belgian Congo in 1921 as part of Carl Ethan Akeley's American Museum of Natural History expedition. This was one of the first expeditions to study gorillas. The expedition trailed some of the animals and shot five for display in American museums. Bradley undertook other expeditions to Africa in 1924 and 1930–1; he also traveled to Sumatra and Indochina in 1935 to hunt tigers. Bradley became chair of the Brookfield Zoo's animal committee in 1933, with responsibility for sourcing animals for the collection. He held this position and appointment as vice-president of the zoo until 1951, when he resigned to undertake an animal-collecting expedition in Africa.

== Early life ==
Herbert Edwin Bradley was born in Brooklin, Ontario, on December 20, 1871, the third son (of six) of a farmer. He trained as a teacher at the University of Michigan in the United States before attending the Northwestern University Pritzker School of Law in Chicago. After graduation he specialized in mining law and practiced in Chicago from 1901. At around this time he became involved in real estate investment and erected apartments on South Side, Chicago.

Bradley married Mary Hastings, a traveler and writer, in 1910. The couple moved into an apartment at 5344 Hyde Park Boulevard in Chicago in 1912, where they would live for the rest of their lives. The block has one building that had been built by Bradley, and they occupied the top floor, plus a penthouse and roof garden, and were accompanied by a staff of servants. The couple had a daughter, Alice, in 1915; she later became a science fiction writer under the pseudonym James Tiptree Jr.

== 1921–22 expedition ==
Bradley was a big-game hunter and took his family onto Carl Ethan Akeley's American Museum of Natural History expedition to the Belgian Congo in 1921. Some contemporaries described his decision to take his wife and child on the expedition as "madness". The expedition searched for gorillas, which had been little studied up to that time. As well as trailing and photographing the animals, the expedition shot and killed five for recovery and preservation as museum exhibits.

Some of the gorilla meat was eaten by members of the expedition. Akeley recalled that when Bradley shot one large and placid male that "it took all one's scientific ardour to keep from feeling like a murderer" and Mary, discussing the same event, noted she would "never forget the humanness of that black, upturned face". She later campaigned for gorillas to be protected from game hunters and for protective reservations to be established. During the expedition Bradley and Alice became ill, and a series of blood transfusions from Mary were required to save their lives. The expedition returned to the United States in 1922, and Bradley spent the following two years in convalescence. Mary wrote On the Gorilla Trail in 1922 about the expedition.

== Later life ==
Bradley and his family undertook a second expedition to the Congo in 1924, which was the first to move through the country west of Lake Edward; Mary published Caravans and Cannibals in 1926 about this trip. A third expedition of 1930–31 studied the African Pygmies and Mangbetu people. Bradley traveled along in 1935 to Sumatra and Indochina to hunt tigers.

Bradley was involved with Chicago's Brookfield Zoo and in 1933 became chair of their animal committee, tasked with gathering animals for the collection. He later became a vice president of the zoo, though he resigned in 1951 to embark upon an animal-collecting expedition to Africa. Bradley had aimed to bring okapis to the zoo since 1939 and achieved his aim in 1955. He died in Chicago on April 22, 1961.
