= List of Theta Sigma Phi chapters =

Theta Sigma Phi was an American honor society for women in journalism. It was established in 1909 at the University of Washington in Seattle, Washington. It was called Women in Communications, Inc. from 1972 to 1996. The society ceased operations in 1996.

== Collegiate chapters ==
The following is a list of Theta Sigma Phi collegiate chapters as of 1968, with inactive chapters and institutions indicated in italics.

Chapter	Charter date and range	Institution	Location	Status	Ref.
Alpha	April 8, 1909	University of Washington	Seattle, Washington	Inactive	
Beta	1910	University of Wisconsin	Madison, Wisconsin	Inactive	
Gamma	1911	University of Missouri	Columbia, Missouri	Inactive	
Delta	March 4, 1913	Indiana University Bloomington	Bloomington, Indiana	Inactive	
Eta	1913	Ohio State University	Columbus, Ohio	Inactive	
Zeta	1915	University of Oklahoma	Norman, Oklahoma	Inactive	
Epsilon	1914	University of Kansas	Lawrence, Kansas	Inactive	
Theta	1915	University of Oregon	Eugene, Oregon	Inactive	
Iota	1916	Stanford University	Stanford, California	Inactive	
Kappa	1916	University of Montana	Missoula, Montana	Inactive	
Lambda	1916	University of Nebraska–Lincoln	Lincoln, Nebraska	Inactive	
Mu	1916	Kansas State University	Manhattan, Kansas	Inactive	
Nu	1917	University of Minnesota	Minneapolis, Minnesota	Inactive	
Xi	1919	University of Texas at Austin	Austin, Texas	Inactive	
Omicron	January 10, 1918	Iowa State University	Ames, Iowa	Inactive	
Pi	May 25, 1918	University of Illinois	Champaign, Illinois	Inactive	
Rho	May 27, 1918	University of Iowa	Iowa City, Iowa	Inactive	
Sigma	November 22, 1919	DePauw University	Greencastle, Indiana	Inactive	
Tau	May 30, 1931	New York University	New York City, New York	Inactive	
Upsilon	May 27, 1920	Lawrence University	Appleton, Wisconsin	Inactive	
Phi	May 29, 1920 - June 1927	Knox College	Galesburg, Illinois	Inactive	
Chi	May 29, 1920	University of Kentucky	Lexington, Kentucky	Inactive	
Psi	May 31, 1920	Columbia University	New York City, New York	Inactive	
Omega	May 29, 1920	Syracuse University	Syracuse, New York	Inactive	
Alpha Alpha	February 9, 1922	University of California, Berkeley	Berkeley, California	Inactive	
Alpha Beta	April 1923	Northwestern University	Evanston, Illinois	Inactive	
Alpha Gamma	May 11, 1923	Marquette University	Milwaukee, Wisconsin	Inactive	
Alpha Delta	May 23, 1923	Grinnell College	Grinnell, Iowa	Inactive	
Alpha Epsilon	October 12, 1925	Mary Hardin–Baylor College	Belton, Texas	Inactive	
Alpha Zeta	October 24, 1925	Washington State University	Pullman, Washington	Inactive	
Alpha Eta	October 17, 1925	Oregon State University	Corvallis, Oregon	Inactive	
Alpha Theta	May 23, 1926	University of Michigan	Ann Arbor, Michigan	Inactive	
Alpha Iota	March 12, 1927	Butler University	Indianapolis, Indiana	Inactive	
Alpha Kappa	November 4, 1927	Louisiana State University	Baton Rouge, Louisiana	Inactive	
Alpha Lambda	December 4, 1927	University of Colorado Boulder	Boulder, Colorado	Inactive	
Alpha Mu	May 10, 1930	Southern Methodist University	Dallas, Texas	Inactive	
Alpha Nu	May 27, 1930	Baylor University	Waco, Texas	Inactive	
Alpha Xi	May 30, 1930	University of Georgia	Athens, Georgia	Inactive	
Alpha Omicron	June 8, 1930	University of Southern California	Los Angeles, California	Inactive	
Alpha Pi	1932	Texas Woman's University	Denton, Texas	Inactive	
Alpha Rho	April 1933	Drake University	Des Moines, Iowa	Inactive	
Alpha Sigma	October 25, 1933	Temple University	Philadelphia, Pennsylvania	Inactive	
Alpha Tau	October 1935	Pennsylvania State University	University Park, Pennsylvania	Inactive	
Alpha Upsilon	1941	Texas Tech University	Lubbock, Texas	Inactive	
Alpha Phi	1941	Ohio University	Athens, Ohio	Inactive	
Alpha Chi	1942	Oklahoma State University	Stillwater, Oklahoma	Inactive	
Alpha Psi	1944	Michigan State University	East Lansing, Michigan	Inactive	
Alpha Omega	1946	Franklin College	Franklin, Indiana	Inactive	
Beta Alpha	1947	University of North Dakota	Grand Forks, North Dakota	Inactive	
Beta Beta	1947	West Virginia University	Morgantown, West Virginia	Inactive	
Beta Gamma	1949	University of Alabama	Tuscaloosa, Alabama	Inactive	
Beta Delta	1949	South Dakota State University	Brookings, South Dakota	Inactive	
Beta Epsilon	1950	University of Houston	Houston, Texas	Inactive	
Beta Zeta	1951	Kent State University	Kent, Ohio	Inactive	
Beta Eta	1952	University of Mississippi	Oxford, Mississippi	Inactive	
Beta Theta	1952	University of New Mexico	Albuquerque, New Mexico	Inactive	
Beta Iota	1953	University of Miami	Coral Gables, Florida	Inactive	
Beta Kappa	1953	University of North Texas	Denton, Texas	Inactive	
Beta Lambda	1954	Purdue University	West Lafayette, Indiana	Inactive	
Beta Mu	1954	Wayne State University	Detroit, Michigan	Inactive	
Beta Nu	1955	University of Idaho	Moscow, Idaho	Inactive	
Beta Xi	1956	University of Florida	Gainesville, Florida	Inactive	
Beta Omicron	1957	American University	Washington, D.C.	Inactive	
Beta Pi	1958	San Jose State University	San Jose, California	Inactive	
Beta Rho	1959	University of California, Los Angeles	Los Angeles, California	Inactive	
Beta Sigma	1959	University of Utah	Salt Lake City, Utah	Inactive	
Beta Tau	1961	Southern Illinois University Carbondale	Carbondale, Illinois	Inactive	
Beta Upsilon	1961	University of Arizona	Tucson, Arizona	Inactive	
Beta Phi	1962	Duquesne University	Pittsburgh, Pennsylvania	Inactive	
Beta Chi	1963	University of South Carolina	Columbia, South Carolina	Inactive	
Beta Psi	1964	Fresno State College	Fresno, California	Inactive	
Beta Omega	1967	Texas Christian University	Fort Worth, Texas	Inactive	
Gamma Alpha	196x ?	University of Maryland	College Park, Maryland	Inactive	
Gamma Beta	196x ?	San Fernando Valley State College	Northridge, Los Angeles, California	Inactive	
Gamma Epsilon	prior to August 1972	Trinity University	San Antonio, Texas		
	May 12, 1972	East Texas State University	Commerce, Texas	Inactive	

== Professional chapters and alumna clubs ==
The following is a list of Theta Sigma Phi professional chapters and alumna clubs as of 1968, with inactive chapters indicated in italics.

Chapter	Charter date and range	Location	Status	Ref.
Akron Club		Akron, Ohio	Inactive	
Albuquerque		Albuquerque, New Mexico	Inactive	
Ames Club		Ames, Iowa	Inactive	
Atlanta		Atlanta, Georgia	Inactive	
Austin		Austin, Texas	Inactive	
Baton Rouge		Baton Rouge, Louisiana	Inactive	
Birmingham	April 19, 1929	Birmingham, Alabama	Inactive	
Bloomington	192x ?	Bloomington, Indiana	Inactive	
Blue Grass Club		Lexington, Kentucky	Inactive	
Boise Club		Boise, Idaho	Inactive	
Boston Club		Boston, Massachusetts	Inactive	
Broward County		Fort Lauderdale, Florida	Inactive	
Central New York		Fayetteville, New York	Inactive	
Champaign-Urbana Club		Champaign, Illinois	Inactive	
Charlotte Club		Charlotte, North Carolina	Inactive	
Chicago	192x ?	Chicago, Illinois	Inactive	
Cincinnati		Cincinnati, Ohio	Inactive	
Cleveland		Cleveland, Ohio	Inactive	
Colorado Springs Club		Colorado Springs, Colorado	Inactive	
Columbia Club		Columbia, Missouri	Inactive	
Columbus	192x ?	Columbus, Ohio	Inactive	
Dallas	1931	Dallas, Texas	Inactive	
Dayton		Dayton, Ohio	Inactive	
Denver	c. 1928	Denver, Colorado	Inactive	
Des Moines Club	c. 1928	Des Moines, Iowa	Inactive	
Detroit		Detroit, Michigan	Inactive	
Eugene Club		Eugene, Oregon	Inactive	
Florida West Coast		St. Petersburg, Florida	Inactive	
Fort Worth		Fort Worth, Texas	Inactive	
Gainesville Club		Gainesville, Florida	Inactive	
Honolulu	February 1929	Honolulu, Hawaii	Inactive	
Houston		Houston, Texas	Inactive	
Indianapolis	c. 1928	Indianapolis, Indiana	Inactive	
Iowa City Club		Iowa City, Iowa	Inactive	
Kansas City	1919	Kansas City, Missouri	Inactive	
Lansing Club		Lansing, Michigan	Inactive	
Lawrence Club		Lawrence, Kansas	Inactive	
Lexington	November 4, 1930	Lexington, Kentucky	Inactive	
Lincoln	February 20, 1929	Lincoln, Nebraska	Inactive	
Los Angeles		Los Angeles, California	Inactive	
Madison		Madison, Wisconsin	Inactive	
Miami		Miami, Florida	Inactive	
Milwaukee	c. 1928	Milwaukee, Wisconsin	Inactive	
Muncie		Muncie, Indiana	Inactive	
Nashville Club		Nashville, Tennessee	Inactive	
National Capital	192x ?	Washington, D.C.	Inactive	
New Orleans Club		New Orleans, Louisiana	Inactive	
New York City	192x ?	New York City, New York	Inactive	
Norman Club		Norman, Oklahoma	Inactive	
North Shore		Evanston, Illinois	Inactiv	
Oakland-Berkeley		Oakland and Berkeley, California	Inactive	
Oklahoma City		Oklahoma City, Oklahoma	Inactive	
Omaha Club	192x ?–before 1968	Omaha, Nebraska	Inactive	
Orange County Club		Laguna Beach, California	Inactive	
Peninsula		San Jose, California	Inactive	
Philadelphia		Philadelphia, Pennsylvania	Inactive	
Phoenix		Phoenix, Arizona	Inactive	
Pittsburgh		Pittsburgh, Pennsylvania	Inactive	
Portland		Portland, Oregon	Inactive	
Rochester		Rochester, New York	Inactive	
Sacramento Club		Sacramento, California	Inactive	
St. Louis	c. 1928	St. Louis, Missouri	Inactive	
San Antoinio		San Antonio, Texas	Inactive	
San Diego		San Diego, California	Inactive	
San Francisco Club	c. 1928	San Francisco, California	Inactive	
Seattle	192x ?	Seattle, Washington	Inactive	
Spokane	192x ?	Spokane, Washington	Inactive	
Stillwater Club		Stillwater, Oklahoma	Inactive	
Takoma Club		Takoma, Washington	Inactive	
Topeka		Topeka, Kansas	Inactive	
Tucson Club		Tucson, Arizona	Inactive	
Tulsa		Tulsa, Oklahoma	Inactive	
Twin Cities	192x ?	Minneapolis, Minnesota	Inactive	
Wichita Club		Wichita, Kansas	Inactive	

== See also ==
- List of Theta Sigma Phi members
