= Lois Wille =

American journalist and author (1931–2019)

Lois Jean Wille
- Born: Lois Jean Krober; September 19, 1931; Chicago, Illinois, U.S.
- Died: July 23, 2019 (aged 87); Chicago, Illinois, U.S.
- Education: Northwestern University
- Occupations: Journalist, editor, author
- Spouse: Wayne Wille (m. 1954)
- Writing career
- Language: English
- Subjects: Public health, public housing, gender and racial inequality
- Notable awards: Pulitzer Prize for Public Service; Pulitzer Prize for Editorial Writing

Lois Jean Wille (/wɪliː/; née Kroeber; September 19, 1931 – July 23, 2019) was a Chicago-based journalist, editor, and author. She won her first of two Pulitzer Prizes in 1963 for a series on local government's failure to provide contraceptive information and services to low-income women. Her stories led to a number of important policy changes in women's healthcare, public housing, and the juvenile court systems. In 1989, she received her second Pulitzer Prize for editorial writing.

== Early life ==
Wille was born in Chicago, Illinois in 1931 to architect Walter and homemaker Adele, née Taege. She had one younger brother, Donald. Soon after she was born, she moved with her family to Arlington Heights, Illinois, a suburb of Chicago. Wille's maternal ancestors were of German descent, and lived in Chicago since the 1800s. Her mother was born in Arlington Heights. Wille's father was born in Leipzig, Germany, and moved to America in 1924 after finishing college.

Wille described her father as "an intellectual...[who] loved mathematics, science, archaeology and transmitted a lot of that to my brother and to me." Her mother "did...the things that a mother and homemaker did in the thirties and forties...but also early on developed a great interest in politics and civic affairs and later in her life she was one of the most avid listeners of talk shows and radio and readers of newspapers. I think she read newspapers more thoroughly than I did."

Wille attended a Lutheran grammar school and Arlington Heights High School before attending Northwestern University, where she received both a bachelor's degree and master's degree from the university's Medill School of Journalism, Media, Integrated Marketing Communications in 1953 and 1954, respectively. Wille won the Northwestern Alumnae Award in 1986.

While a senior at Northwestern, Wille was the managing editor of the campus newspaper, The Daily Northwestern. She also was involved in the efforts to integrate campus dormitories.

== Journalism career ==
=== Chicago Daily News and first Pulitzer Prize ===
Upon graduation, Wille began her career at the Chicago Daily News in 1956. At the time, most women were assigned "feminine" beats, like "Our Gal" stories, fashion coverage, and celebrity interviews. Among Wille's early work included interviewing film star Cary Grant, coverage of Khrushchev's visit to the United States, and a feature on the Lady of Angels school fire.

When Wille saw an opening in the newsroom in 1957, she jumped at the opportunity. She got the job, becoming one of two women in the newsroom. "The jobs were hard to get," Wille recalled. "The excuse we kept hearing: 'Well, what if you get pregnant? Then you're going to quit.' And what do you say? You vow never to get pregnant? It was nonsense, and it's something a boss or editor would never dare say today."

Early in her career, Wille began covering the civil rights movement and social welfare issues. Much of that work involved reporting on the conditions of Chicago's ghettos, with a focus on disparities in housing and healthcare. In September 1962, Wille ran a five-part series investigating the state's failure to provide birth control information and services to women on public aid and women below the poverty line. She found that city public health clinics and the public Cook County Hospital refused to give women information on contraception if they relied on the state for health care.

"I had wanted to write about this problem for a long time," said Wille, "both because it was important to women's health and because it denied an essential part of health care to poor women that more affluent women got as a matter of course."

Wille faced some pushback in the lead-up to running her series. The editor of the Chicago Daily News, Maurice "Ritz" Fisher, was a devout Catholic with reservations about publishing a story involving birth control. After consulting a local Catholic priest and activist, Fisher allowed the story to be run. Less than three months after the story's publication, the Illinois Public Aid Commission voted 6–4 to pay for birth control for welfare recipients. In 1963, Wille won her first Pulitzer Prize for Public Service.

Wille had said that she never imagined she would win a Pulitzer for this story, and that her goal was to change public policy. "It bothered me that women who were so poor that they had to rely on government for their medical care could not get the same quality of care that I could," Wille said in her interview with Diane Gentry in 1991. "Women were dying because of it. There were women who were aborting themselves and dying. Children who were being abandoned because they were unwanted. So that's what motivated me."

During that time period, Wille also wrote a series on children who developed brain damage from eating lead paint in tenements, investigated issues with commitment procedures at a local mental health clinic, and reported on the failures of the juvenile court system in Cook County. For several of her stories, Wille went undercover or semi-undercover.

After leading a report on the impact on Chicago of the death of Mayor Richard J. Daley, Wille shifted her focus from investigative to editorial writing. She was promoted to editor of the editorial page in 1977.

=== Chicago Sun-Times, Chicago Tribune, and later career ===
When the Chicago Daily News ceased publication in 1978, Wille became the editorial page editor at the Chicago Sun-Times. In 1984, following Rupert Murdoch's purchase of the Sun-Times, Wille left the paper for its rival paper, the Chicago Tribune. In 1987, she became editor of the Tribune's editorial page. In 1989, she received her second Pulitzer Prize in Editorial Writing. She retired from the Tribune in 1991.

Wille's colleagues at the Tribune described her as "standard-bearer for women, a remarkably adroit writer-thinker-editor who is tough and dogged without losing her femininity."

Doug Kneeland, Wille's deputy editorial page editor, wrote of his colleague: "No question. If Lois Wille were running Chicago, it would be a better place. Fairer, more decent, more honest, more demanding and more giving, preserving the best part of its past, while reaching out eagerly to make even more of its future—for all of its people."

Columnist Mike Royko, Wille's colleague at the Daily News, Sun-Times, and Tribune, described Wille as having "no weaknesses as a journalist", stating: "Over the years, I've seen lots of Pulitzer prize winners in action, but I have never seen anyone who is superb at everything, except Lois. She's brilliant, with the best analytical mind I've ever seen. She's a superb writer, great reporter, marvelous organizer. If she had been a man she could have been editor of the Chicago Daily News and Sun-Times."

=== Bibliography ===
- Wille, Lois (1991). Forever Open, Clear, and Free : The Struggle for Chicago's Lakefront. Chicago: University of Chicago Press. ISBN 0-226-89871-7. OCLC 22859072.
- Wille, Lois (1997). At Home in the Loop : How Clout and Community Built Chicago's Dearborn Park. Carbondale: Southern Illinois University Press. ISBN 0-8093-2126-2. OCLC 36126525.

== Personal life ==
Wille met her husband, Wayne, also an editor and journalist, in a journalism class at Northwestern. They were married in 1954, the same year Wille received her master's degree. They had no children.

== Death ==
Wille died on July 23, 2019, in Chicago following a severe stroke.
