= Eleanor Murdoch Johnson =

American educator and editor

Eleanor M. Johnson
- Born: December 10, 1892; Washington County, Maryland
- Died: October 8, 1987 (aged 94); Gaithersburg, Maryland
- Education: University of Chicago; Columbia University
- Occupations: Educator, editor
- Known for: Co-founding My Weekly Reader

Eleanor Murdoch Johnson (1892–1987) was an American educator and editor. She founded the children's periodical My Weekly Reader and was its editor-in-chief from 1935 to 1961. She was a schoolteacher in Oklahoma and served as superintendent of schools in Ohio and Pennsylvania. Johnson served on the editorial board of Education magazine. She was a graduate of Columbia University and the University of Chicago.

== Early life and education ==
Eleanor Murdoch Johnson was born in Washington County, Maryland, on December 10, 1892, to farmers Emma J. (née Shuff) and Richard Potts Johnson. She attended Colorado College from 1911 to 1912. She earned a degree from the Central State Teachers College in 1913. In 1925 she earned her PhB cum laude from the University of Chicago and an MA from Columbia University in 1932.

== Career ==
Following her graduation from Central State Teachers College in Oklahoma, Johnson was a public school teacher. She taught in Lawton from 1913 to 1916, in Chickasha from 1916 to 1917, and in Oklahoma City from 1917 to 1918. She was the superintendent for the Drumright, Oklahoma, elementary schools from 1918 to 1922. She also served as superintendent in Oklahoma City from 1922 to 1926. Johnson then moved to Pennsylvania, where she was a superintendent in York from 1926 to 1930. While working in Pennsylvania, she came up with the idea for a weekly children's newspaper. She approached American Education Publications with the idea and worked on the format and content for the periodical. The first issue was published on September 21, 1928. She was the assistant superintendent in Lakewood, Ohio, from 1930 to 1934.

Johnson co-founded My Weekly Reader in 1934. She served as the editor-in-chief for the publication, joining the staff of American Education Publications in 1935. The paper was first published in 1928. She was also involved in the publishing of Current Events and was the author of textbooks on mathematics, reading, and geography. She authored the children's books Treasury of Literature Readers and Child Story Readers. She retired as editor-in-chief of My Weekly Reader in 1961 and was a consultant for Xerox Educational Publications. She continued to be involved in the publication of My Weekly Reader until 1978 and served on the editorial board of Education magazine.

Johnson died of cancer in Gaithersburg, Maryland, on October 8, 1987.

== Publication ==
- Johnson, Eleanor M. (1963). "What Is Happening to Children's Storybooks?". The Reading Teacher. 17 (3): 178–181. ISSN 0034-0561. JSTOR 20197744.
