= Mary Hastings Bradley =

American novelist

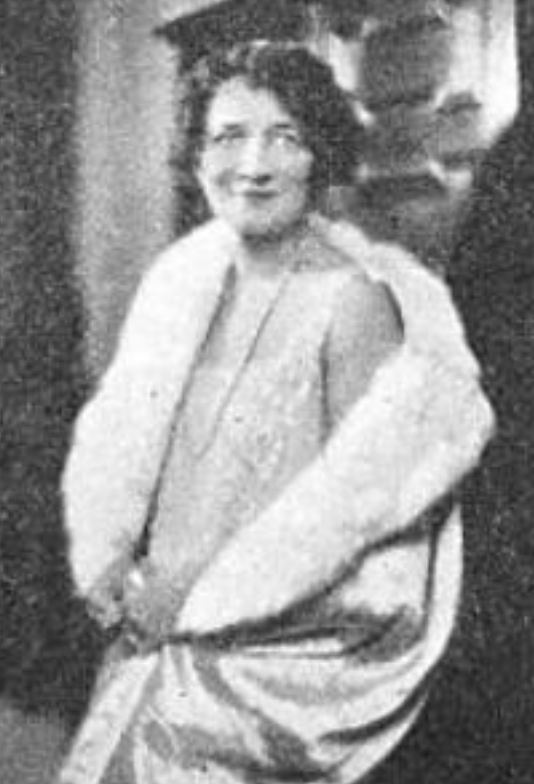
- Bradley, from a 1929 publication
- Born: Mary Wilhelmina Hastings; April 19, 1882; Chicago, Illinois, U.S.
- Died: October 25, 1976 (aged 94)
- Occupations: Writer, traveler
- Spouse: Herbert Edwin Bradley
- Children: James Tiptree Jr. (daughter)
- Relatives: Carl E. Akeley (uncle)

Mary Hastings Bradley (born Mary Wilhelmina Hastings, April 19, 1882 in Chicago – October 25, 1976) was a traveler and author. She was the mother of the author Alice Sheldon ("James Tiptree, Jr.").

== Life and work ==
She was born Mary Wilhelmina Hastings in 1882 in Chicago, Illinois, USA. She graduated from Smith College in 1905 where she majored in English. After graduation she traveled to Egypt with a cousin and was inspired to write "The Palace of Darkened Windows" and "The Fortieth Door" detailing the life of the veiled and secluded women of Egypt. Both of these stories were later made into films, providing a further audience for Bradley's writings. While doing research for her book The Favor of Kings in Oxford, she met her husband Herbert Edwin Bradley. Herbert Bradley was a lawyer, big game hunter, traveler and explorer who later helped found the Brookfield Zoo. They were married in 1910 and five years later they had a daughter, Alice.

In 1921 and 1922, Mary, Herbert and Alice traveled to the Belgian Congo with her uncle, Carl E. Akeley of the American Museum of Natural History, for specimens of the mountain gorilla for display in the museum. These expeditions were described in her books, On the Gorilla Trail, Alice in Jungleland and Alice in Elephantland. In 1938 her story "The Life of the Party" was chosen to appear in The O. Henry Prize Stories anthology. As a war correspondent for Colliers magazine in 1945, Mary took on the difficult task of reporting on women in the military in Italy, France and Germany. At the close of the war she recounted her tour of concentration camps in a magazine feature series on the Holocaust.

Bradley was a prolific author of mysteries, travel books, short fiction and novels, most notably the Old Chicago series of historical novels. The four books in this series — The Fort, The Duel, Debt of Honor and Metropolis — cover a span of Chicago history from 1812, when it was still part of frontier America, to the World's Fair in 1893. They were originally published together in a slipcased edition in 1933.

She was frequently asked to lecture on her travels and was inducted into the Society of Woman Geographers, whose membership included Amelia Earhart, Margaret Mead and Eleanor Roosevelt. Bradley was one of the few female presidents of the Society of Midland Authors as well as an active clubwoman in Chicago.

It was Bradley's death in late October 1976 that inadvertently revealed that her daughter, Alice B. Sheldon, was the prominent science fiction writer James Tiptree, Jr.

== Selected books ==
Expedition-related books

- On the Gorilla Trail (1922)
- Caravans and Cannibals (1926)
- Alice in Jungleland (1927)
- Alice in Elephantland (1929)
- Trailing the Tiger (1929)

Old Chicago historical novels

- The Fort (1933)
- The Duel (1933)
- Debt of Honor (1933)
- Metropolis (1933)

Other books

- The Favor of Kings (1912)
- The Palace of Darkened Windows (1914)
- The Splendid Chance (1915)
- The Wine of Astonishment (1919)
- The Fortieth Door (1920)
- The Innocent Adventuress (1921)
- Murder in the Room 700 (1931)
- The Road of Desperation (1932)
- Unconfessed (1934)
- A Hanging Matter (1937)
- Pattern of Three (1937)
- The Hunters (1943)
- Incident in Berlin (1944)
- Understudy (1946)
- Seventy-Five Years of Best Girls (1948)
- Murder in the Family (1951)
- Nice People Murder (1952)
- Nice People Poison (1952)
