= Genevieve Forbes Herrick =

American journalist

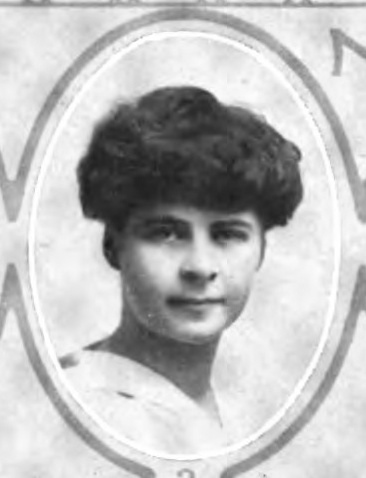
- Born: May 21, 1894; Chicago
- Died: December 17, 1962 (aged 68); Santa Fe
- Occupation: Journalist
- Spouse(s): John Origen Herrick

Genevieve Forbes Herrick (May 21, 1894 – December 17, 1962) was a journalist for the Chicago Tribune.

== Early life ==
Genevieve Forbes was born in Chicago, Illinois, on May 21, 1894, the daughter of Frank G. Forbes and Carolyn D. (Gee) Forbes. She attended Lakeview High School, then earned a bachelor's degree from Northwestern University in 1916 and a master's degree in English from the University of Chicago in 1917. At Northwestern, she was the first female editor-in-chief of the student newspaper, The Daily Northwestern. After teaching English for a year at Waterloo High School, she joined the Chicago Tribune in 1918.

== Chicago Tribune ==
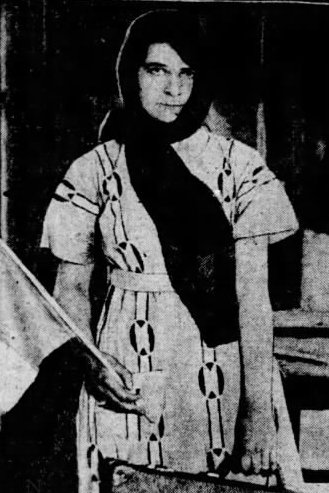
Genevieve Forbes undercover as an Irish immigrant in 1921.

After a few years working as an assistant editor and covering literary and society events, Forbes got her breakthrough story in 1921 when she went to County Wexford, Ireland and posed undercover as an Irish immigrant making the journey to Ellis Island. Her 13-part series exposed the indignities and abuses, often physical, that immigrants suffered entering the United States. The series prompted an investigation by the United States House of Representatives and the replacement of Ellis Island Commissioner Frederick A. Wallis.

Most of Herrick's work in the 1920s was the crime beat, reporting on Chicago's many gangsters and criminals. In 1924, she covered the Leopold and Loeb trial, where she met her future husband, reporter John Origen Herrick. They married on September 6, 1924, and her byline became Genevieve Forbes Herrick. Reportedly, the judge in the trial delayed sentencing to accommodate the Herricks' wedding.

In March 1930, Herrick interviewed notorious gangster Al Capone, who complained "All I ever did is sell beer and whiskey to our best people."

Herrick took a special interest in women in politics, covering, among others, US Representative Ruth Hanna McCormick, US Senator Hattie Wyatt Caraway, US Secretary of Labor Frances Perkins, and Alice Roosevelt Longworth. She criticized them when they refused to talk to the press, as she believed it was their obligation as public figures and role models.

== Roosevelt administration ==
Herrick became closely associated with First Lady Eleanor Roosevelt. From the first one in 1933, Herrick was a regular attendee of Roosevelt's famous press conferences limited to women reporters. She became one of the "faithful four" reporters most trusted by Roosevelt and was a frequent lunch guest at the White House. Herrick also made some appearances on Roosevelt's radio show on the NBC Red Network, Mrs. Roosevelt's Own Program.

Tribune publisher Robert R. McCormick was an ardent opponent of the Roosevelt administration and the New Deal. Following pointed criticism of her reporting by McCormick in May 1934, Herrick felt compelled to resign from the Tribune and the Tribune's WGN Radio.

Herrick continued her journalistic work at other outlets, including regular columns at the New York Daily News and the magazine The Country Gentleman. She was president of the Women's National Press Club from 1933 to 1935.

In August 1935, Herrick was seriously injured in and spent months recovering from a car accident in New Mexico that killed Anna Wilmarth Ickes, wife of US Secretary of the Interior Harold Ickes.

During World War II, Herrick worked for the US Treasury Department, then became press relations chief for the Women's Army Corps. She worked in several capacities for the Office of War Information, eventually becoming chief of their Book and Magazine Bureau.

== Later life ==
The Herricks moved to New Mexico in 1951. Genevieve Herrick did little writing in the 1950s. She died in St. Vincent's Hospital in Santa Fe, New Mexico on December 17, 1962, at the age of 68. The Herricks are buried in Arlington National Cemetery.
