= Weekly Reader Publishing =

American educational material publisher

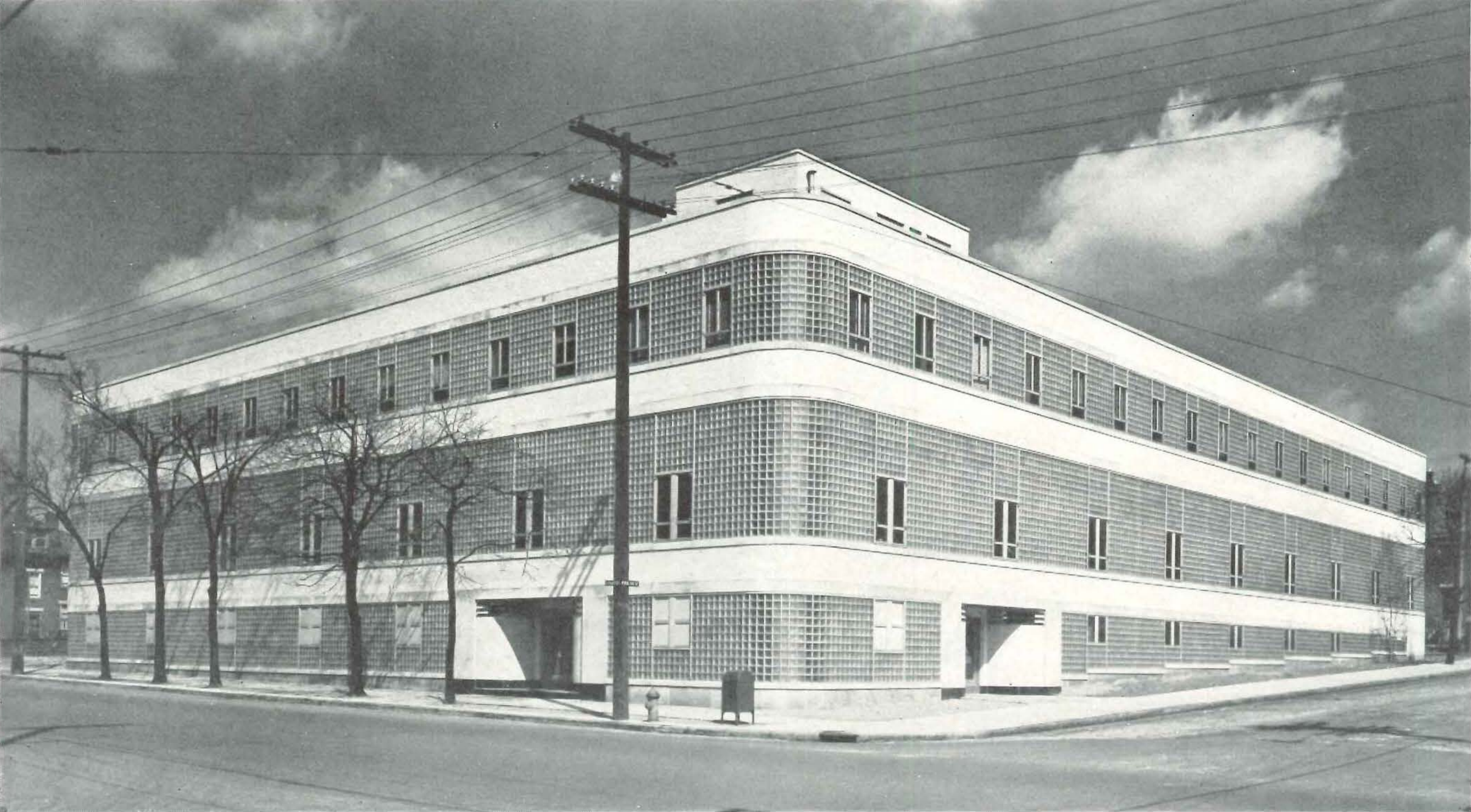
The American Education Press Building, the company's office and printer from 1936 to the 1950s

Weekly Reader Publishing was a publisher of educational materials in the United States that had been in existence for over 100 years. It provided teaching materials to elementary and secondary schools that was used by more than 90 percent of that country's school districts.

== Overview ==
The company’s flagship publication was Weekly Reader, a grade-specific classroom magazine that served elementary students in over 50,000 schools across the country.

Weekly Reader also published branded periodicals and instructional materials for middle and high school students, along with a full range of supplementary educational materials for grades Pre-K–9. These curriculum-specific products included classroom magazines, workbooks, reproducibles, early learning centers, and more.

The company’s age- and grade-appropriate elementary and secondary publications integrated reading, writing, science, math, social studies, current events, and life skills topics into “news-style” classroom magazines and other formats.

The company, by then known as American Education Publications, was purchased for $8.6 million in 1949 by Wesleyan University, which sold it in 1965 to Xerox Corp. in exchange for $56 million in stock.

In 2007, Weekly Reader Corporation became part of The Reader's Digest Association, based in Chappaqua, New York. Weekly Reader's main office was relocated from Stamford, Connecticut, to Chappaqua at the end of May 2007.

It was acquired by Scholastic Corporation in 2012, which shut down its title publications and integrated the company into its Scholastic News division.

== Elementary school classroom magazines ==
Weekly Reader – grade-appropriate magazines for students in grades Pre-K to 2. Content built children’s general knowledge, reinforced the literacy scope and sequence used in the classroom, and aligned with national standards. Weekly Reader helped students read, write, talk, and listen, while reinforcing themes and skills taught in basal reading programs.

WR News – grade-appropriate news magazines for students in grades 3 to 6.

== Middle school and high school classroom magazines ==
Read was for students in grades 6–10. It included plays, fiction, and nonfiction that motivated students to read while building reading comprehension skills.

Current Events was for students in grades 1–10. In-depth coverage of world and national news in a student-friendly format.

Current Health 1 & 2 – for students in grades 6–8 and 1–12 respectively. Covered most state health curricula, so it could be used as a stand-alone teaching tool.

Current Science – for students in grades 3–10. Each issue covered major areas of the science curriculum, using relevant news and events.

Career World – for students in grades 1–12. Gave students guidance to make better decisions about school, careers, and life after school.

== Supplementary educational materials ==
Student-practice books, reproducibles, and activity centers for students in grades Pre-K–9 that supplemented an array of curriculum areas, support teaching standards. Grade-appropriate resources that helped children achieve their educational goals.
