= Weekly Reader =

Children's educational classroom magazine

- Cover of the November 7–11, 1955, issue
- Categories: Classroom magazine
- Frequency: Weekly
- Founded: 1928
- Final issue: 2012
- Country: United States
- Language: English
- Website: Weeklyreader.com

Weekly Reader was a weekly educational classroom magazine designed for children. It began in 1928 as My Weekly Reader. Editions covered curriculum themes in the younger grade levels and news-based, current events and curriculum themed-issues in older grade levels. The publishing company also created workbooks, literacy centers, and picture books for younger grades.

In 2012, Weekly Reader ceased operations as an independent publication and merged with its new owner, Scholastic News, due primarily to market pressures to create digital editions as well as decreasing school budgets.

== History ==
Formerly My Weekly Reader, the Weekly Reader was a weekly newspaper for elementary school children. It was first published by the American Education Press of Columbus, Ohio, which had been founded in 1902 by Charles Palmer Davis to publish Current Events, a paper for secondary school children. The first issue appeared on September 21, 1928.

The first editor was Martha Fulton, who had been hired that summer by Preston Davis, the major owner of the Press, and Harrison Sayre, who became managing editor. Sayre, also the editor of World News, a paper for high school students, had been urged to start a paper for grade schools by teachers he had met in June 1928, while on a sales trip in Indiana. Martha Fulton, who was a friend of Sayre's wife, Mary, and a graduate of Wells College, enjoyed travel and adventure. During World War I, she had been an American Red Cross worker in France. She also had "a remarkable rapport with children and had lively interests in every direction." The lead article was about the boyhoods of Herbert Hoover and Al Smith. There were two shorter articles: "Wings for Safety", about street crossing guards; and, "Sky Medicine", which was about the healthful qualities of the Sun. The most popular was a letter from "Uncle Ben" about a ride in a German glider on Cape Cod. Fulton wrote all these articles. Her sister Peg was the first artist, though soon replaced by her friend Mary Sherwood Wright. Beginning with the third issue, Eleanor Johnson, director of elementary schools in York, Pennsylvania, designed tests for the back page.

My Weekly Reader was an instant success. By December, circulation was 99,000. In 1929, a second edition was started for younger children, and their combined circulation was 376,000. By 1931, there were four editions, with a combined circulation of 1,099,000.

The keys to its early success were the timely news articles that had a children's angle, and the Uncle Ben letters describing new inventions and discoveries that excited children's imaginations. For example, the second issue's lead article, "A Village Moves to the South Pole", was about Admiral Byrd's 75-man expedition, their sled dogs, and Paul Siple, a Boy Scout who was with them. Uncle Ben wrote about planned "Seadromes", floating airports that airplanes could use to hop across the Atlantic. The third issue, published on October 5, 1928, began with "How Mother Nature Prepares for Winter". Uncle Ben described seeing his "first radio television set", even though the paper itself had yet to print even a photograph—illustrations for the Reader having only been drawings to date. On October 12, he wrote about Zeppelins, and the first Reader photographs appeared. They depicted "Mr. and Mrs. Hoover" and "Mr. and Mrs. Smith and Grandchildren".

Harrison Sayre, who became president of the American Education Press while remaining managing editor of My Weekly Reader, gave Martha Fulton the major credit for the newspaper's popularity. In his memoirs, Sayre quoted Gertrude Wolff, another editor who shared an office with Fulton: "As I had had some editorial experience, she at times sought my advice on minor details, but the conception and execution of those first issues were hers alone. With her imagination, enthusiasm, intuitive understanding of a child's world, she sensed what would appeal to her young readers. Her very personal stamp on the new publication distinguished the succeeding issues during her years as editor."

As the new editions for upper and lower grades were added, Fulton remained the principal writer, even after her marriage in 1930 (to Clarence L. Sager, a New York City lawyer) and her moves to New York City and Old Greenwich, Connecticut. Sayre remembered that Fulton wrote for the papers for twelve years, adding that "men of the composing room...testify that with her square, legible, longhand copy, she never missed a deadline".

Other people who were important to the newspaper's early years were Laura E. Zirbes, a reading expert at the Ohio State University laboratory school, and Dr. Charles H. Judd of the University of Chicago, who introduced Sayre to Dr. William S. Gray, who in turn supplied Fulton with graded vocabulary lists. In 1930, Eleanor Johnson moved from York to Lakewood, Ohio, where she was assistant superintendent of schools until 1934, when she moved to Columbus and later became a managing editor.

In 1934, a fifth edition was added for the fifth and sixth grades. The price was twenty cents per semester. Circulation continued to rise, passing two million in 1942. Many people still fondly remember the papers they read as children and how they looked forward to Friday afternoons when their teachers handed out the latest issue.

In 1949, the American Education Press was sold to Wesleyan University and became American Education Publications, a division of the Wesleyan University Press. Editorial offices were moved to Middletown, Connecticut, but printing continued to be done in Columbus, Ohio. There were then six editions, one for each elementary grade, with a total circulation of 4,269,000. Total circulation of AEP papers was 5,605,000. In 1965, Wesleyan sold American Education Publications to the Xerox Corporation to form Xerox Education Press. By then, there was also a kindergarten edition. Eleanor Johnson was editor-in-chief of all editions. A pre-kindergarten edition was added in 1980. There were also curriculum-specific magazines for middle and high school students, including areas such as health, science, careers, reading, and writing.

In 1988, Xerox sold the company to the Field Corporation headed by Marshall Field V, heir to the Marshall Field's department store fortune to form Field Publications, which in turn became Newfield Publications after being sold to K-III Communications, a holding company owned by KKR.

Weekly Reader Publishing, which began with the publication of the first Current Events on May 20, 1902, celebrated its 100th birthday in 2002.

At various times through its publishing history, the magazine was known as My Weekly Reader or Weekly Reader.

In 2007, Weekly Reader Corporation became part of The Reader's Digest Association, based in Chappaqua, New York. Weekly Reader's main office was relocated from Stamford, Connecticut, to Chappaqua at the end of May 2007. Financial difficulties marred the publication during its time under Reader's Digest ownership; the magazine made efforts to launch an online presence for the magazine but were unable to secure the funds from the parent organization to do so, a factor in the magazine's decline.

In February 2012, Weekly Reader was acquired by Scholastic, which operated the competing Scholastic News. Scholastic announced that it would be shutting down Weekly Reader publication and moving some of its staff to Scholastic News. Following the completion of the merger, the merged magazines are:

- Let’s Find Out / Weekly Reader Pre-K
- Let’s Find Out / Weekly Reader K
- Scholastic News / Weekly Reader Edition 1
- Scholastic News / Weekly Reader Edition 2
- Scholastic News / Weekly Reader Edition 3
- Scholastic News / Weekly Reader Edition 4
- Scholastic News / Weekly Reader Edition 5/6

== Polls ==
One of the best-known events in the magazine's history is its quadrennial "Weekly Reader Student Presidential Election Poll". The poll is an educational exercise in which Weekly Reader-subscribing teachers conduct mock elections to find their students' preference for president. Teachers tabulate the results, then send them to Weekly Reader. (Since 2000, the surveys have been developed with, and tabulated by, the Zogby International polling organization.) This survey of students in grades K through 12 began in 1956, when readers chose Dwight Eisenhower over Adlai Stevenson.

The poll was conducted 14 times, the last being in 2008 and the students had voted for the candidate who became president a remarkable 13 out of 14 times. The one exception was in 1992, when George H. W. Bush garnered more votes than Bill Clinton. Notably, third-party candidate Ross Perot, whose presence on the national ballot was important during the actual election, was not on the Weekly Reader ballot that year.

== Read ==
In 2005, Weekly Reader Publishing's literary magazine, Read, launched Word, a blog that features student writing and other literary news. It also offers interactive opportunities for reading and writing, including its "What's Your Story?" program, which features "The Weekly Writer", where students can help authors such as Stephen King and R. L. Stine finish an original story. Read magazine has pioneered "electronic issues" around literary themes, including Canterbury Tales, William Shakespeare, and Edgar Allan Poe; these interactive websites incorporate video and film, music and sound effects, rap renditions and flash animation. In the 2009–2010 school year, the company extended these "e-issues" to four other Weekly Reader publications, including Weekly Reader editions 3 and Senior (4-6 grades), Current Events and Current Science magazines.
