= Read (magazine) =

Children's classroom magazine

READ Magazine was a children's classroom magazine for grades 6–10, published by Weekly Reader Corporation. It included a mix of classic and contemporary fiction and nonfiction, including plays, personal narratives, poetry, and more to help build reading comprehension and verbal skills. The headquarters was in Delran, New Jersey. It was based in Middletown, Connecticut, and was published on a biweekly basis at the end of the 1980s.

READ had 15 printed issues and 3 electronic issues per publishing year, and featured the work of a number of illustrators, including Alex Bradley, Noma Bliss, and many others. The final issue was published May 2012, Vol. 61 No. 10. Weekly Reader Corporation was bought by Scholastic in Spring 2012, and thereafter ceased to exist.
