= Feminist science fiction =

Subgenre of science fiction

Feminist science fiction is a subgenre of science fiction (abbreviated "SF") focused on such feminist themes as: gender inequality, sexuality, race, economics, reproduction, and environment. Feminist SF is political because of its tendency to critique the dominant culture. Some of the most notable feminist science fiction works have illustrated these themes using utopias to explore a society in which gender differences or gender power imbalances do not exist, or dystopias to explore worlds in which gender inequalities are intensified, thus asserting a need for feminist work to continue.

Science fiction and fantasy serve as important vehicles for feminist thought, particularly as bridges between theory and practice. No other genres so actively invite representations of the ultimate goals of feminism: worlds free of sexism, worlds in which women's contributions (to science) are recognized and valued, worlds that explore the diversity of women's desire and sexuality, and worlds that move beyond gender.

— Elyce Rae Helford

== Definition ==
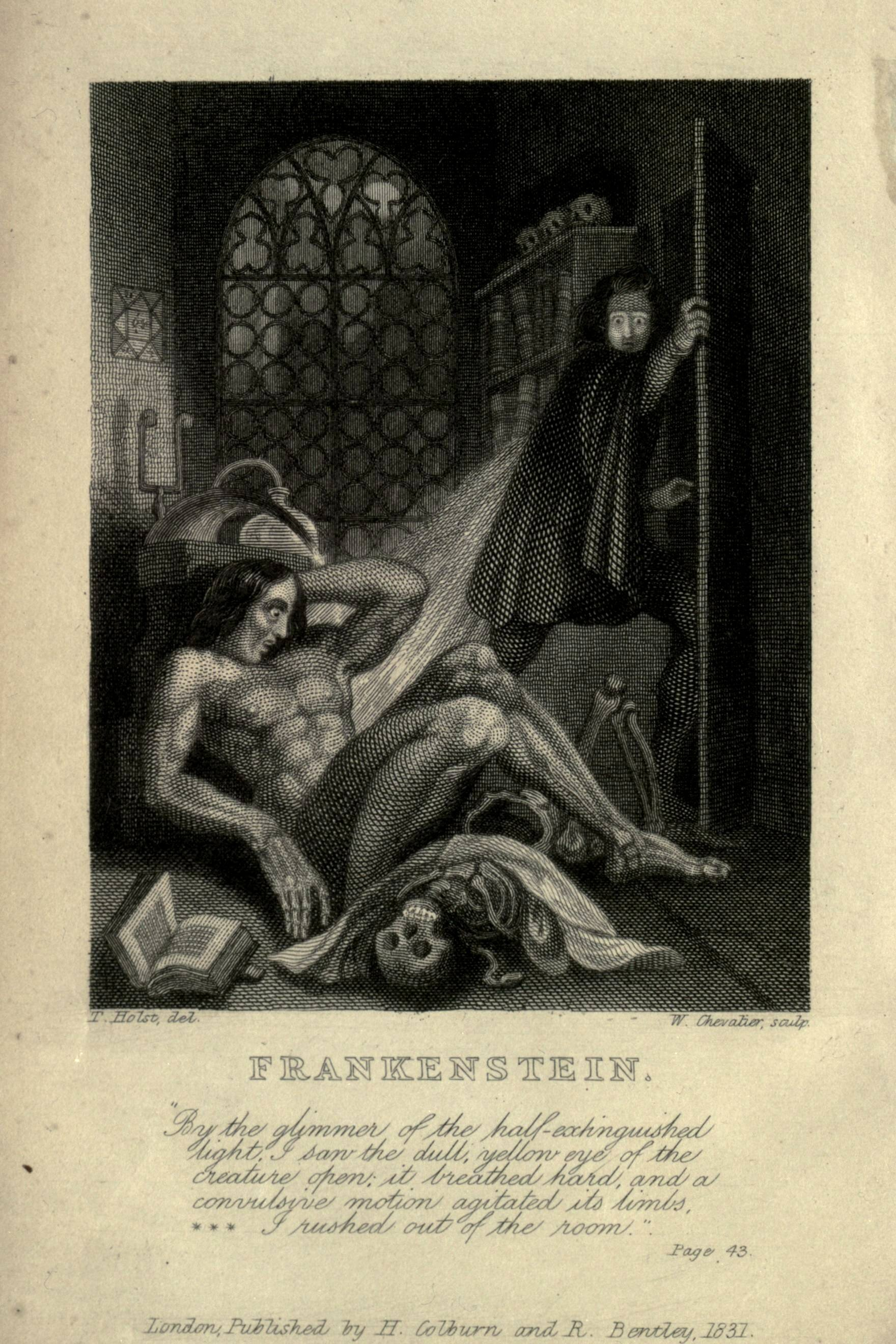
Frankenstein by Mary Shelley (1818)

Feminist science fiction is a sub-genre of science fiction (SF for short) that focuses on theories that include feminist themes, for example gender inequality, sexuality, race, economics and reproduction. Feminist science fiction spans a wider range than science fiction itself, covering fantasy, utopia and dystopia, horror (such as Anne Rice's vampire stories). Marleen S. Barr says that what is described as feminist 'SF' is not really 'SF' at all, because it is not concerned with 'hard science' but with women's drive for power. Hard science fiction is of course a subset of science fiction. She thought we needed to use a term like feminist fabulation.

Fantasy literature is de facto a privileged genre for tackling feminist themes. Because it allows to reflect on the future, on the possibilities of humanity and science, this literature allows all progressive and innovative ideas to coexist. So, to qualify as feminist science fiction, the stories must carry a political message, that of challenging the male/female paradigm in society. With this in mind, in the early 1990s the American feminist fanzine Aurora SF published a list of ten levels of feminism to measure the political content of a text. This graduation of the political message ranges from simple questioning of patriarchal society, to egalitarian discourse between the sexes, to systematic criticism of men, to the establishment of feminist and lesbian utopia.

In her book In the chinks of the world machine: feminism and science fiction, Scottish author Sarah LeFanu distinguishes between feminist SF and women's SF insofar as the latter, while having a certain influence on the development of science fiction in general by rejecting sexism and featuring female heroes, does not make feminist demands.

Feminist science fiction (SF) distinguishes between female SF authors and feminist SF authors. Both female and feminist SF authors are historically significant to the feminist SF subgenre, as female writers have increased women's visibility and perspectives in SF literary traditions, while the feminist writers have foregrounded political themes and tropes in their works. Because distinctions between female and feminist can be blurry, whether a work is considered feminist can be debatable, but there are generally agreed-upon canonical texts, which help define the subgenre.

== History ==
=== Early modern times ===
As early as the English Restoration, female authors were using themes of SF and imagined futures to explore women's issues, roles, and place in society. This can be seen as early as 1666 in Margaret Cavendish's The Blazing World, in which she describes a utopian kingdom ruled by an empress. This foundational work has garnered attention from some feminist critics, such as Dale Spender, who considered this a forerunner of the science fiction genre, more generally. Another early female writer of science fiction was Mary Shelley. Her novel Frankenstein (1818) dealt with the asexual creation of new life, and has been considered by some a reimagining of the Adam and Eve story.

Her book is a critique of Darwinist ideas and also of the use of science without ethical reflection, as well as of the seventeenth-century view that science was endowed with a certain virility aimed at penetrating the secrets of nature, presented as other, feminine and objectified. The book paved the way for future explorations of the cyborg theme by feminist science fiction and had a lasting influence.

In France, feminist writer Marie-Anne de Roumier-Robert's The Voyages of Lord Seaton to the Seven Planets, published in 1758, is considered one of the first science fiction novels. Refusing to overlook the contribution made by women to science and culture for the sole benefit of men, Marie-Anne Robert wrote an initiatory tale designed to develop women's critical faculties, and ultimately work towards their emancipation.

=== First-wave feminism (suffrage) ===
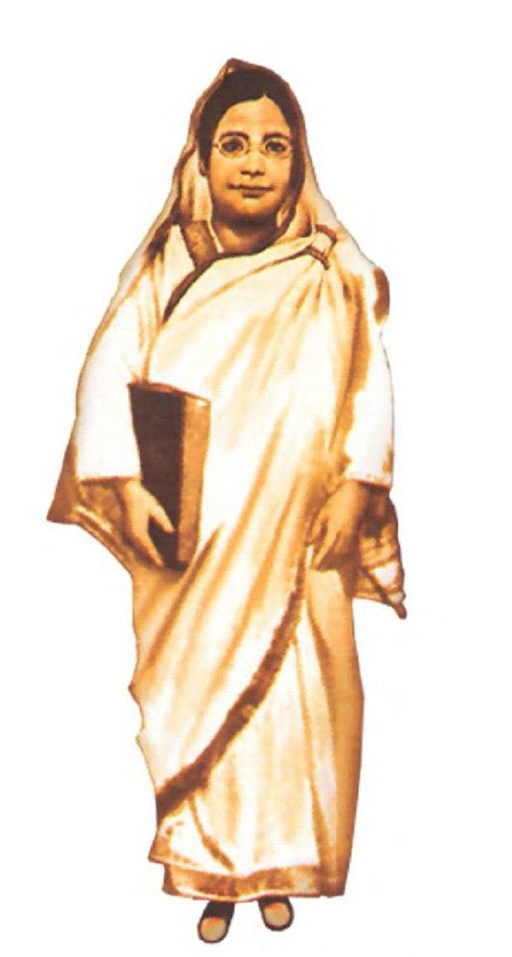
Begum Rokeya, a Bengali feminist who in 1905 wrote one of the earliest feminist science fiction, Sultana's Dream. She is considered to be one of the earliest Muslim feminists.

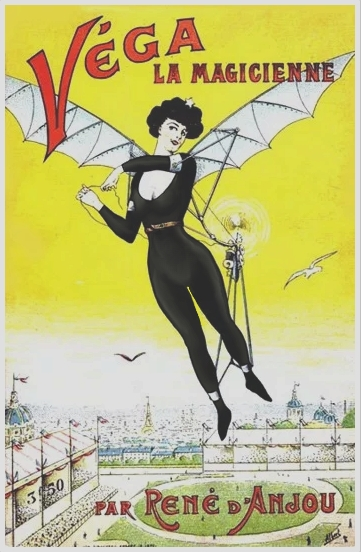
L'Oiselle published in 1909 features the first super superheroine.

Women writers involved in the utopian literature movement of the late nineteenth and early twentieth centuries could be considered the first feminist SF authors. Their texts, emerging during the first-wave feminist movement, often addressed issues of sexism through imagining different worlds that challenged gender expectations. In 1881, Mizora: A Prophecy described a women-only world with technological innovations such as parthenogenesis, videophones, and artificial meat.

It was closely followed by other feminist utopian works, such as Elizabeth Burgoyne Corbett's New Amazonia: A Foretaste of the Future (1889). In 1892, poet and abolitionist Frances Harper published Iola Leroy, one of the first novels by an African American woman. Set during the antebellum South, it follows the life of a mixed race woman with mostly white ancestry and records the hopes of many African Americans for social equality—of race and gender—during Reconstruction. Unveiling a Parallel (1893) features a male protagonist who takes an "aeroplane" to Mars, visiting two different "Marsian" societies; in both, there is equality between men and women. In one, Paleveria, women have adopted the negative characteristics of men; in Caskia, the other, gender equality "has made both sexes kind, loving, and generous." Two American Populists, A.O. Grigsby and Mary P. Lowe, published NEQUA or The Problem of the Ages (1900), which explores issues of gender norms and posited structural inequality. This recently rediscovered novel displays familiar feminist SF conventions: a heroine narrator who masquerades as a man, the exploration of sexist mores, and the description of a future hollow earth society (like Mizora) where women are equal.

Sultana's Dream (1905), by Rokeya Sakhawat Hussain, a Bengali writer and Muslim feminist, engages with the limited role of women in colonial India. Through depicting a gender-reversed purdah in an alternate technologically futuristic world, Rokeya Sakhawat Hussain's book has been described as illustrating the potential for cultural insights through role reversals early on in the subgenre's formation.

In the utopian novel Beatrice the Sixteenth (1909), transgender writer Irene Clyde creates a world where gender is no longer recognized and the story itself is told without the use of gendered nouns. Along these same lines, Charlotte Perkins Gilman explores and critiques the expectations of women and men by creating a single-sex world in Herland (1915), possibly the most well-known of the early feminist SF and utopian novels.

In 1909, the French author Renée Marie Gouraud d'Ablancourt published Vega la magicienne, depicting L'Oiselle, a winged superheroine and the first Francophone superhero series.

Rhoda Broughton is also one of a number of 19th-century women writing in the successful science fiction genre.

Rosa Rosà (Edith von Haynau) wrote the first Italian feminist science fiction with Una donna con tre anime in 1918.

=== Between the wars ===
During the 1920s and 1930s, many popular pulp science fiction magazines exaggerated views of masculinity and featured portrayals of women that were perceived as sexist. These views would be subtly satirized by Stella Gibbons in Cold Comfort Farm (1932) and much later by Margaret Atwood in The Blind Assassin (2000). As early as 1920, however, women writers of this time, such as Clare Winger Harris ("The Runaway World," 1926) and Gertrude Barrows Bennett (Claimed, 1920), published science fiction stories written from female perspectives and occasionally dealt with gender and sexuality-based topics.

John Wyndham, writing under his early pen-name of John Beynon Harris, was a rare pulp writer to include female leads in stories such as "The Venus Adventure" (Wonder Stories, 1932), in which a mixed crew travel to Venus. The story opens in a future in which women are no longer enslaved by pregnancy and childbirth thanks to artificial incubators, which are opposed by a religious minority. Women have used this freedom to enter professions including chemistry. Wyndham's outlook was so rare that in a serialisation of his novel Stowaway to Mars, one magazine editor "corrected" the name of the central character Joan to John. Wyndham then had to write them a new final instalment to replace the conclusion in which Joan fell in love and became pregnant.

==== The Fate of the Poseidonia, 1927 ====
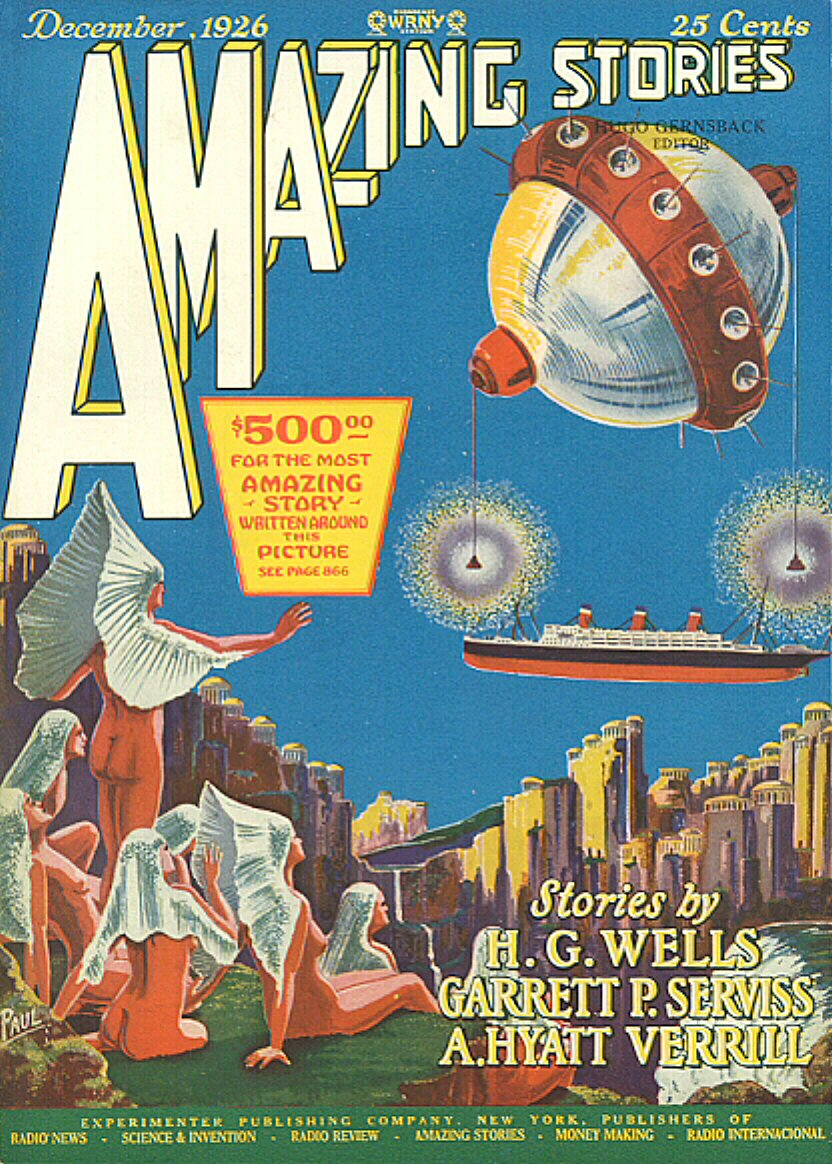
The cover of Amazing Stories, December 1926, which describes Clare Winger Harris's short story "The Fate of the Poseidonia".

The first science fiction story published in a magazine by a woman in America was The Fate of the Poseidonia, written by Clare Winger Harris in 1927. The story was published by Hugo Gernsback in the pulp magazine Amazing Stories. The story was published as part of a science fiction competition, in which 300 short stories were proposed. Hugo Gernsback put out a call to his magazine's readership for this competition, inviting them to send in texts describing the cover of Amazing Stories in December 1926. The cover featured an ocean liner floating in space. Using the term 'fans' to describe his male and female readers, blurring the boundary between readership and writing, he allowed women to take part for the first time. The 1920s saw the establishment of what was later to become 'fandom'.

=== Post World War II ===
The Post-WWII and Cold War eras were a pivotal and often overlooked period in feminist SF history. During this time, female authors utilized the SF genre to assess critically the rapidly changing social, cultural, and technological landscape. Women SF authors during the post-WWII and Cold War time periods directly engage in the exploration of the impacts of science and technology on women and their families, which was a focal point in the public consciousness during the 1950s and 1960s. These female SF authors, often published in SF magazines such as The Avalonian, Astounding, The Magazine of Fantasy & Science Fiction, and Galaxy, which were open to new stories and authors that pushed the boundaries of form and content.

At the beginning of the Cold War, economic restructuring, technological advancements, new domestic technologies (washing machines, electric appliances), increased economic mobility of an emerging middle class, and an emphasis on consumptive practices, carved out a new technological domestic sphere where women were circumscribed to a new job description – the professional housewife. Published feminist SF stories were told from the perspectives of women (characters and authors) who often identified within traditional roles of housewives or homemakers, a subversive act in many ways given the traditionally male-centered nature of the SF genre and society during that time.

In Galactic Suburbia, author Lisa Yaszek recovers many women SF authors of the post-WWII era such as Judith Merril, author of "That Only a Mother" (1948), "Daughters of Earth" (1952), "Project Nursemaid" (1955), "The Lady Was a Tramp" (1957); Alice Eleanor Jones "Life, Incorporated" (1955), "The Happy Clown" (1955), "Recruiting Officer" (1955); and Shirley Jackson "One Ordinary Day, with Peanuts" (1955) and "The Omen" (1958). These authors often blurred the boundaries of feminist SF fiction and feminist speculative fiction, but their work laid substantive foundations for second-wave feminist SF authors to directly engage with the feminist project. "Simply put, women turned to SF in the 1940s, 1950s, and 1960s because it provided them with growing audiences for fiction that was both socially engaged and aesthetically innovative."

=== Second-wave feminism ===
By the 1960s, science fiction was combining sensationalism with political and technological critiques of society. With the advent of second-wave feminism, women's roles were questioned in this "subversive, mind expanding genre". Three notable texts of this period are Ursula K. Le Guin's The Left Hand of Darkness (1969), Marge Piercy's Woman on the Edge of Time (1976) and Joanna Russ's The Female Man (1970). Each highlights what the authors believe to be the socially constructed aspects of gender roles by creating worlds with genderless societies. Two of these authors were pioneers in feminist criticism of science fiction during the 1960s and 1970s through essays collected in The Language of the Night (Le Guin, 1979) and How To Suppress Women's Writing (Russ, 1983). Also of note, Madeleine L'Engle's A Wrinkle in Time (1962), written for children and teens, features a 13-year-old girl protagonist, Meg Murry, whose mother, Mrs. Murry, is a scientist with degrees in biology and bacteriology. L'Engle's novel is decidedly science fiction, feminist, and deeply Christian, and the first of her series, The Time Quintet. Meg's adventures to other planets, galaxies, and dimensions are aided in Wrinkle by three ancient beings, Mrs What, Mrs Which, and Mrs Who who "tesser" to travel vast distances. A Wrinkle in Time was awarded the Newbery Medal in 1963 and has never been out of print. Men also contributed literature to feminist science fiction. Prominently, Samuel R. Delany's short story, "Time Considered as a Helix of Semi-Precious Stones" (1968), which won the Hugo Award for Best Short Story in 1970, follows the life of a gay man that includes themes involving sadomasochism, gender, significance of language, and when high and low society encounter one another, while his novel Babel-17 has a Chinese woman as its primary hero and protagonist. Octavia Butler's Kindred (1979) tells the story of an African American woman living in the United States in 1979 who uncontrollably time travels to the antebellum South. The novel poses complicated questions about the nature of sexuality, gender, and race when the present faces the past.

The Demon Breed is a 1968 science fiction novel by James H. Schmitz in which the female main character, Nyles Etland, armed only with intelligence and intimate knowledge of her home environment, allies and science, intimidated an alien species who had intended to invade. Schmitz, who still commands a cult audience half a century after his death, dealt almost exclusively in competent and intelligent female main characters in dozens of novels and short stories.

=== 1980s onwards ===
Feminist science fiction continues on into the 1980s with Margaret Atwood's novel The Handmaid's Tale (1985), a dystopic tale of a theocratic society in which women have been systematically stripped of all liberty. The book was motivated by fear of potential retrogressive effects on women's rights. Sheri S. Tepper is perhaps best known for her series The True Game, which explore the Lands of the True Game, a portion of a planet explored by humanity somewhere in the future. In November 2015, she received the World Fantasy Award for Life Achievement for this series. Tepper has written under several pseudonyms, including A. J. Orde, E. E. Horlak, and B. J. Oliphant. Carol Emshwiller is another feminist SF author whose best known works are Carmen Dog (1988), The Mount (2002), and Mister Boots (2005). Emshwiller had also been writing SF for The Magazine of Fantasy and Science Fiction since 1974. She won the World Fantasy Award for Life Achievement in 2005 for her novel The Mount (2002). This novel explores the prey/predator mentality through an alien race. Another author of the 1980s, Pamela Sargent has written the "Seed Series", which included Earthseed, Farseed, and Seed Seeker (1983–2010), the "Venus Series" about the terraforming of Venus, which includes Venus of Dreams, Venus of Shadows, and Child of Venus (1986–2001), and The Shore of Women (1986). Sargent is also the 2012 winner of the Pilgrim Award for lifetime contributions to SF/F studies. Lois McMaster Bujold has won both the Hugo Award and the Nebula Award for her novella The Mountains of Mourning, which is part of her series the "Vorkosigan Saga" (1986–2012). This saga includes points of view from a number of minority characters, and is also highly concerned with medical ethics, identity, and sexual reproduction.

More recent science fiction authors illuminate what they contend are injustices that are still prevalent. At the time of the LA Riots, Japanese-American writer Cynthia Kadohata's work In the Heart of the Valley of Love (1992) was published. Her story, set in the year 2052, examines tensions between two groups as defined as the "haves" and the "have-nots" and is written as seen through the eyes of a nineteen-year-old girl who is of Asian and African descent. Nalo Hopkinson's Falling in Love With Hominids (2015) is a collection of her short stories whose subjects range from an historical fantasy involving colonialism in the Caribbean, to age manipulation, to ethnic diversity in the land of Faerie, among others.

In the early 1990s, a new award opportunity for feminist SF authors was created. The James Tiptree, Jr. Award is an annual literary prize for works of science fiction or fantasy that expand or explore one's understanding of gender (Alice Sheldon was a female writer who published science fiction under the Tiptree pen name). Science fiction authors Pat Murphy and Karen Joy Fowler initiated this subsequent discussion at WisCon in February 1991. The authors' publishing in feminist SF after 1991 were now eligible for an award named after one of the genre's beloved authors. Karen Joy Fowler herself is considered a feminist SF writer for her short stories, such as "What I Didn't See", for which she received the Nebula Award in 2004. This story is an homage to Sheldon, and describes a gorilla hunting expedition in Africa. Pat Murphy won a number of awards for her feminist SF novels as well, including her second novel The Falling Woman (1986), a tale of personal conflict and visionary experiences set during an archaeological field study for which she won the Nebula Award in 1988. She won another Nebula Award in the same year for her story "Rachel in Love". Her short story collection, Points of Departure (1990) won the Philip K. Dick Award, and her 1990 novella "Bones" won the 1991 World Fantasy Award.

Other winners of the James Tiptree, Jr. Award include "The Sparrow" by Mary Doria Russell (1996), "Black Wine" by Candas Jane Dorsey (1997), Redwood and Wildfire by Andrea Hairston (2011), "The Carhullan Army" by Sarah Hall (2007), Ammonite by Nicola Griffith (1993), and "The Conqueror's Child" by Suzy McKee Charnas (1999). All of these authors have had an important impact on the SF world by adding a feminist perspective to the traditionally male genre.

Eileen Gunn's science fiction short story "Coming to Terms" received the Nebula Award (2004) in the United States and the Sense of Gender Award (2007) in Japan, and has been nominated twice each for the Hugo Award, Philip K. Dick Award and World Fantasy Award, and short-listed for the James Tiptree, Jr. Award. Her most popular anthology of short stories is Questionable Practices, which includes stories "Up the Fire Road" and "Chop Wood, Carry Water". She also edited "The WisCon Chronicles 2: Provocative Essays on Feminism, Race, Revolution, and the Future" with L. Timmel Duchamp. Duchamp has been known in the feminist SF community for her first novel Alanya to Alanya (2005), the first of a series of five titled "The Marq'ssan Cycle". Alanya to Alanya is set on a near-future earth controlled by a male-dominated ruling class patterned loosely after the corporate world of today. Duchamp has also published a number of short stories, and is an editor for Aqueduct Press. Lisa Goldstein is another well respected feminist sf author. The novelette Dark Rooms (2007) is one of her better known works, and another one of her novels, The Uncertain Places, won the Mythopoeic Award for Best Adult Novel in 2012.

== Recurrent themes ==
Works of feminist science fiction are often similar in the goals they work towards as well as the subjects and plotlines they focus on in order to achieve those goals. Feminist science fiction is science fiction that carries across feminist ideals and the promotion of societal values such as gender equality, and the elimination of patriarchal oppression. Feminist science fiction works often present tropes that are recurrent across science fiction with an emphasis on gender relations and gender roles. Many elements of science fiction, such as cyborgs and implants, as well as utopias and dystopias, are given context in a gendered environment, providing a real contrast with present-day gender relations while remaining a work of science fiction.

=== Utopian and dystopian societies ===
Representations of utopian and dystopian societies in feminist science fiction place an increased emphasis on gender roles while countering the anti-utopian philosophies of the 20th century. Male philosophers such as John Rawls, Isaiah Berlin, and Michael Oakeshott often criticize the idea of utopia, theorizing that it would be impossible to establish a utopia without violence and hegemony. Many male authored works of science fiction as well as threads of philosophical utopian thought dismiss utopias as something unattainable, whereas in feminist science fiction, utopian society is often presented as something both achievable and desirable.

Anti-utopian philosophies and feminist science fiction come to odds in the possibility of achieving utopia. In "Rehabilitating Utopia: Feminist Science Fiction and Finding the Ideal", an article published in Contemporary Justice Review, philosophers against the dream of utopia argue that "First is the expectation that utopia justifies violence, second is the expectation that utopia collapses individual desires into one communal norm, and third is the expectation that utopia mandates a robotic focus on problem-solving." In feminist science fiction, utopias are often realized through a communal want for an ideal society. One such novel is summarized in the aforementioned article, Charlotte Perkins Gilman's novel Herland, in which "Gilman perfectly captures the utopian impulse that all problems are solvable. She establishes a society where every consideration about a question aims for the rational answer." Gilman's utopia is presented as something attainable and achievable without conflict, neither enabling violence nor extinguishing individualism.

In the Parable series by feminist science fiction novelist Octavia Butler, anti-utopian philosophies are criticized via a dystopian setting. In the first novel, Parable of the Sower, following the destruction of her home and family, Lauren Olamina, one of many who live in a dystopian, ungoverned society, seeks to form her own utopian religion entitled 'Earthseed'. Olamina's utopian creation does not justify the use of violence as a means, no matter how expedient, to justify the end, achieving utopia, no matter how desirable. Yet we witness that she cannot avoid violence, as it results from little more than promulgating ideas different from those held by the majority of those living within the current social structure, however disorganized and ungoverned that social structure may be. Butler posits that utopian society can never be achieved as an entity entirely separate from the outside world, one of the more commonly held beliefs about conditions necessary to achieve utopia. Olamina's, and Butler's, utopia is envisioned as a community with a shared vision that is not forced on all within it.

One common trend in feminist science fiction utopias is the existence of utopian worlds as single-gendered – most commonly female, an early example being Emília Freitas's 1899 novel A Rainha do Ignoto. In literary works female utopias are portrayed as free of conflict, and intentionally free of men. The single gendered utopias of female science fiction are free of the conflicts that feminism aims to eliminate, such as oppression and gender inequality inherent in patriarchal society. In a statement about these single gendered utopias, Joanna Russ, author of The Female Man, theorized that male-only societies were not written because in patriarchal society, male oppression is not as pressing an issue as is female oppression.

Utopia as an ideal to strive for is not a concept wholly limited to feminist science fiction, however many non-feminist science fiction works often dismiss utopia as an unachievable goal, and as such, believe that pursuits for utopia should be considered dangerous and barren. Anti-utopian theory focuses on the 'how' in the transition from present society to a utopian future. In feminist science fiction, the achievement of a utopian future depends on the ability to recognize the need for improvement and the perseverance to overcome the obstacles present in creating a utopian society.

=== Representation of women ===
Perhaps the most obvious attraction of science fiction to women writers – feminist or not – is the possibilities it offers for the creation of a female hero. The demands of realism in the contemporary or historical novel set limits which do not bind the universes available to science fiction. Although the history of science fiction reveals few heroic, realistic, or even original images of women, the genre had a potential recognized by the women writers drawn to it in the 1960s and 1970s. Before this time, the appeal for women writers was not that great. The impact of feminism on the science fiction field can be observed not only in science fiction texts themselves, but also on the development of feminist approaches to science fiction criticism and history, as well as conversations and debates in the science fiction community. One of the main debates is about the representation of women in science fiction. As Joanna Russ put it, "There are plenty of images of women in science fiction. There are hardly any women."

In her article "Redefining Women's Power through Feminist Science Fiction", Maria DeRose suggests that, "One of the great early socialists said that the status of women in a society is a pretty reliable index of the degree of civilization of that society. If this is true, then the very low status of women in science fiction should make us ponder about whether science fiction is civilized at all". The women's movement has made most of us conscious of the fact that Science Fiction has totally ignored women. This "lack of appreciation" is the main reason that women are rebelling and actively fighting to be noticed in the field anyway.

Virginia Wolf relates to this aspect of feminist science fiction in the article "Feminist Criticism and Science Fiction for Children". As she discusses the scarcity of women in the field, she states, "During the first period, that of the nineteenth century, apparently only two women wrote Science Fiction, Mary Shelley and Rhoda Broughton," and continues, "In the early twentieth century, a few women were successful Science Fiction writers". But, "The times changed. Repression gave way to questioning and outright rebellion, and in the Science Fiction of the 1960s stylistic innovations and new concerns emerged 'Many of their stories, instead of dealing with the traditional hardware of science fiction, concentrated on the effects that different societies or perceptions would have on individual characters'". Andre Norton, a semi-well known analyst of Science fiction argues along these lines as well. As Norton explored one or more novels she came across, she realized that the creation of characters and how they are shown is a clear connection to the real world situation. From here, she goes in depth of characters in these feminist novels and relates them to the real world. She concludes here article along these lines. She wanted to get the idea out that feminists have a way to get their voice out there. Now, all their works are famous/ popular enough for their ideas to be let out. Virginia Wolf can attest to this fact. She introduced the idea that women were not represented well in the field till the early 1900s and added to the fact by stating, "Women are not represented well in Science Fiction".

Individual characters, as we come to know, have their own perception and observation of their surroundings. Characters in novels such as The Girl Who Was Plugged In by James Tiptree and Margaret Atwood's The Handmaid's Tale are fully aware of the situation at hand and their role in society. This idea is a continuation of the argument presented by Andre Norton. Wolf argues the same point in her analysis of Le Guin's writing, who has many contributions to the works of feminist Science Fiction. Wolf argues, "What matters to Le Guin is not what people look like or how they behave but whether or not they have choice and whether or not they receive respect for who they are and what they do rather than on the basis of sex. Feminism is for her not a matter of how many women (or characters in Science Fiction) are housewives but a part of our hope for survival, which she believes lies in the search for balance and integration". This stirs up many questions about equality (a debate which has been going on for many years) but nobody seems to have an answer. In this continual search for equality, many characters find themselves asking the same question: "Is Gender Necessary" (which is, coincidentally, one of Le Guin's novels and also another problem arising from gender biases). Robin Roberts, an American literary historian, addresses the link of these characters and what that means for our society today. Roberts believes that men and women would like to be equal, but are not equal. They should be fighting the same battle when in fact they are fighting each other. She also debates that gender equality has been a problem in every reach of feminism, not just in feminist science fiction. Wolf also tackles this problem, "As she explains in "Is Gender Necessary?", The Left Hand of Darkness convinced her that if men and women were completely and genuinely equal in their social roles, equal legally and economically, equal in freedom, in responsibility, and in self-esteem, ... our central problem would not be the one it is now: the problem of exploitation—exploitation of the woman, of the weak, of the earth' (p. 159)". Science fiction criticism has come a long way from its defensive desire to create a canon. All of these authors demonstrate that science fiction criticism tackles the same questions as other literary criticism: race, gender, and the politics of Feminism itself. Wolf believes that evaluating primarily American texts, written over the past one hundred and twenty years, these critics locate science fiction's merits in its speculative possibilities. At the same time, however, all note that the texts they analyze reflect the issues and concerns of the historical period in which the literature was written. DeRose introduces her article with, in effect, the same argument. She says, "the power of women in Science Fiction has greatly depreciated in the past few years".

=== Gender identity ===
Feminist science fiction offers authors the opportunity to imagine worlds and futures in which women are not bound by the standards, rules, and roles that exist in reality. Rather, the genre creates a space in which the gender binary might be troubled and different sexualities may be explored.

As Anna Gilarek explains, issues of gender have been a part of feminist discourse throughout the feminist movement, and the work of authors such as Joanna Russ and Marge Piercy explore and expose gender based oppression. Gilarek outlines two approaches to social critique via Feminist SF: the use of fantastical elements such as "invented worlds, planets, moons, and lands", used to call attention to the ills of society by exaggerating them, or a more straightforward approach, "relying on realist techniques to convey the message about the deficiencies of our world and its social organization, in particular the continued inequality of women". There are many examples of redefined gender roles and gender identity found in Feminist SF, ranging from the inversion of gendered oppression to the amplification of gender stereotypes and tropes. In the short story "The Matter of Seggri", by Ursula Le Guin, traditional gender roles are completely swapped. Men are relegated to roles of athletes and prostitutes while women control the means of production and have exclusive access to education. In Margaret Atwood's The Handmaid's Tale, gendered oppression is exaggerated in a dystopian society in which women's rights are stripped away and fertile women are relegated to the roles of handmaids who will bear children to further the human race. New books continue the dystopian theme of women living in a society which conforms to the wishes of men, at the expense of women's rights and well-being, such as in Louise O'Neill's young adult novel Only Ever Yours. In this work, females are no longer born naturally but are genetically designed before birth to conform to the physical desires of men, then placed in a school in which they are taught not to think (they are never taught to read), and to focus on appearance until they are rated by beauty on a scale at age sixteen, with the top ten becoming the brides of elite men, the middle ten forced into concubinage, and the bottom ten forced to continue their lives as instructors at the school in very humiliating circumstances. At age forty, the women are euthanized. In the post-apocalyptic novel, Gather the Daughters, by Jennie Melamed, females living in an island society are sexually exploited from the time they are girls, are forced to marry at adolescence, and after they become grandmothers must commit suicide.

Over the decades, SF and feminist SF authors have taken different approaches to criticizing gender and gendered society. Helen Merrick outlines the transition from what Joanna Russ describes as the "Battle of the Sexes" tradition to a more egalitarian or androgynous approach. Also known as the "Dominant Woman" stories, the "Battle of the Sexes" stories often present matriarchal societies in which women have overcome their patriarchal oppressors and have achieved dominance. These stories are representative of an anxiety that perceives women's power as a threat to masculinity and the heterosexual norm. As Merrick explains, "And whilst they may at least hint at the vision of a more equal gendered social order, this possibility is undermined by figuring female desire for greater equality in terms of a (stereotypical) masculine drive for power and domination." Examples of these types of stories, written in the 1920s and 30s through the 50s, include Francis Steven's "Friend Island" and Margaret Rupert's "Via the Hewitt Ray"; in 1978, Marion Zimmer Bradley released The Ruins of Isis, a novel about a futuristic matriarchy on a human colony planet where the men are extremely oppressed.

In the 1960s and 1970s, feminist SF authors shifted from the "Battle of the Sexes" writing more egalitarian stories and stories that sought to make the feminine more visible. Ursula Le Guin's The Left Hand of Darkness portrayed an androgynous society in which a world without gender could be imagined. In James Tiptree Jr.'s short story "Houston, Houston, Do You Read?", women are able to be seen in their full humanity due to the absence of men in a post-apocalyptic society. Joanna Russ's works, including "When it Changed" and The Female Man are other examples of exploring femininity and a "deconstruction of the acceptable, liberal 'whole' woman towards a multiple, shifting postmodernist sense of female 'selfhood'".

== Comic books and graphic novels ==
Feminist science fiction is evidenced in the globally popular mediums of comic books, manga, and graphic novels. One of the first appearances of a strong female character was that of the superhero Wonder Woman, co-created by husband and wife team William Moulton Marston and Elizabeth Holloway Marston. In December 1941, Wonder Woman came to life on the pages of All Star Comics, and in the intervening years has been reincarnated in from animated TV series to live-action films, with significant cultural impact. By the early 1960s, Marvel Comics already contained some strong female characters, although they often suffered from stereotypical female weakness such as fainting after intense exertion. By the 1970s and 1980s, true female heroes started to emerge on the pages of comics. This was helped by the emergence of self-identified feminist writers including Ann Nocenti, Linda Fite, and Barbara Kesel. As female visibility in comics increased, the "fainting heroine" type began to fade into the past. However, some female comic book writers, such as Gail Simone, believe that female characters are still relegated to plot devices (see Women in Refrigerators).

Feminism in science fiction shōjo manga has been a theme in the works of Moto Hagio among others, for whom the writings of Ursula K. Le Guin have been a major influence.

== Film and television ==
Feminism has driven the creation of a considerable body of action-oriented science fiction with female protagonists: Wonder Woman (originally created in 1941) and The Bionic Woman during the time of the organized women's movement in the 1970s; Terminator 2: Judgment Day and the Alien tetralogy in the 1980s; and Xena, Warrior Princess, comic book character Red Sonja, and Buffy the Vampire Slayer. 2001 science fiction TV series Dark Angel featured a powerful female protagonist, with gender roles between her and the main male character generally reversed.

However, feminists have also created science fiction that directly engages with feminism beyond the creation of female action heroes. Television and film have offered opportunities for expressing new ideas about social structures and the ways feminists influence science. Feminist science fiction provides a means to challenge the norms of society and suggest new standards for how societies view gender. The genre also deals with male/female categories, showing how female roles can differ from feminine roles. Hence feminism influences the film industry by creating new ways of exploring and looking at masculinity/femininity and male/female roles. A contemporary example of feminist science fiction television can be found in Orphan Black, which deals with issues of reproductive justice, science, gender, and sexuality.

== Fandom ==
By the 1970s, the science fiction community was confronting questions of feminism and sexism within science fiction culture itself. Multiple Hugo-winning fan writer and professor of literature Susan Wood and others organized the "feminist panel" at the 1976 World Science Fiction Convention against considerable resistance. Reactions to the appearance of feminists among fannish ranks led indirectly to the creation of A Women's APA and WisCon.

Feminist science fiction is sometimes taught at the university level to explore the role of social constructs in understanding gender.

== Publications ==
In the 1970s, the first feminist science fiction publications were created. The most well-known are fanzines The Witch and the Chameleon (1974–1976) and Janus (1975–1980), which later became Aurora SF (Aurora Speculative Feminism) (1981–1987). Windhaven, A Journal of Feminist Science Fiction was published from 1977 to 1979 by Jessica Amanda Salmonson in Seattle. Special issues of magazines linked to science fiction meetings were also published at that moment, like the Khatru symposium's fanzine Women in Science Fiction in 1975.

== Critical works ==
Femspec
- Discipline: Feminist speculative fiction
- Language: English
- Edited by: Batya Weinbaum

Publication details
- History: 1999–present
- Publisher: Cleveland State University (United States)
- Frequency: Biannual

Standard abbreviations
- ISO 4: Femspec

Indexing
- ISSN: 1523-4002
- LCCN: sn99008204
- OCLC no.: 55471482

Links
- Journal homepage; Online archive

=== Femspec ===
Femspec is a feminist academic journal specializing in works that challenge gender through speculative genres, including science fiction, fantasy, magical realism, mythic explorations in poetry and post-modern fiction, and horror. There is a conscious multicultural focus of the journal, both in content and in the diverse makeup of its editorial group. The first issue came out in 1999 under the editorial direction of founder Batya Weinbaum, who is still the Editor-in-Chief. Femspec is still publishing as of 2021 and has brought over 1000 authors, critics and artists into print. Having lost their academic home in May 2003, they increasingly cross genres and print write-ups of all books and media received, as well as of events that feature creative works that imaginatively challenge gender such as intentional communities, performance events, and film festivals.

== See also ==
- Feminist literature
- List of feminist comic books
- Single-gender worlds
- Women in speculative fiction

== Bibliography ==
- Clute, John; Nicholls, Peter (1993). The Encyclopedia of Science Fiction (2nd ed.). New York: St. Martin's Griffin. ISBN 9780312134860.
- Helford, Elyce Rae (2005), "Feminism", in Westfahl, Gary (ed.), The Greenwood Encyclopedia of Science Fiction and Fantasy: themes, works and wonders, Westport, Connecticut: Greenwood Press, pp. 289–291, ISBN 9780313329531. Preview.
- Wright, Bradford W. (2003). Comic Book Nation: The Transformation of Youth Culture in America. Baltimore: Johns Hopkins University Press. ISBN 9780801865145. Preview.
