= Richard Suckle =

American film producer (born 1969)

- Born: January 1969 (age 57)
- Education: Gallatin School of Individualized Study
- Occupation: Film producer
- Years active: 1995–present

Richard Suckle (born January 1969) is an American film and television producer. He is best known for producing American Hustle (2013), which earned ten Academy Award nominations, including Best Picture, and won the Golden Globe Award for Best Motion Picture – Musical or Comedy. He has also produced several tentpole films, including the live-action Scooby-Doo series, and DC Comics's Suicide Squad and Wonder Woman franchises. His projects have collectively generated more than $2 billion at the worldwide box office.

Suckle grew up in Philadelphia and graduated from New York University's Gallatin School of Individualized Study in 1991.

In 2024, Suckle was named president of From Red Clay, the newly established content creation division of Trilith Studios.

== Filmography ==
Producer

- Fallen (1998) (Associate producer)
- Scooby-Doo (2002)
- Scooby-Doo 2: Monsters Unleashed (2004)
- Extreme Movie (2008)
- The International (2009)
- American Hustle (2013)
- Suicide Squad (2016)
- Wonder Woman (2017)
- Vicious (2025)

Executive producer

- Yours, Mine & Ours (2005)
- 12 Monkeys (2015)
- The Monster (2016)
- The Whole Truth (2016)
- Dirty John (2018)
- Scoob! (2020)
- Wonder Woman 1984 (2020)
- The Suicide Squad (2021)
