= Grass (Tepper novel) =

1989 science fiction novel by Sheri S. Tepper

- Author: Sheri S. Tepper
- Language: English
- Genre: Science fiction
- Publisher: Doubleday
- Publication date: 1989
- Publication place: United States
- Media type: Print
- ISBN: 978-1-85798-798-0

Grass is a 1989 science fiction novel by Sheri S. Tepper and the first novel of the Arbai trilogy. Styled as an ecological mystery, Grass presents one of Tepper's earliest and perhaps most radical statements on themes that would come to dominate her fiction, in which despoliation of the planet is explicitly linked to gender and social inequalities.

Considered to be among her best works and hailed as "a splendid achievement, one of the most satisfying science fiction novels I have read in years" by The New York Times book critic Gerald Jones at the time of its publication, Grass was nominated for both the Hugo and Locus award in 1990. Interest in the novel continued, and it was included in the SF Masterworks classic science fiction paperback collection in 2002.

== Setting ==
Much of the novel centers on the cosmic anomaly Grass, the only planet immune to a galaxy-wide plague. Grass is so named because almost its entire surface is covered in multi-coloured prairie.

== Premise ==
In the distant future Terra (Earth) has become massively over-populated and its resources overstretched. Partially as a result of this, the human race has spread out across the galaxy and populated new worlds. One such world is the eponymous Grass.

The spread of a seemingly incurable plague across human settlements throughout known space prompts the authoritarian religious rulers of humanity, Sanctity, to send investigators to Grass, the only place the plague does not seem to have affected, in the hope of finding a cure.

Given that the mainly aristocratic inhabitants of Grass have developed an obsession with a localised variant of fox hunting using the planet's native fauna in place of the horses, hounds, and foxes found on Earth, Sanctity chooses as its investigators the Westriding-Yrarier family, whose equestrian background and upper class roots may enable them to successfully infiltrate the aristocratic society and learn more about the hitherto secretive planet. But the secret of the planet's immunity hides a truth so shattering it could mean the end of life itself.

== Reception ==
Tepper's work has been situated by some critics into a significant lineage of feminist science fiction by women, in particular the moderate feminism of the 1980s that included authors like Joan Slonczewski and Pamela Sargent. However, in part due to her later 1988 work The Gate to Women's Country, which raised ethical questions due to its premise of genetically altering violence out of men while also removing homosexuality from the population, Tepper has been received as a controversial figure. Beyond this controversy, her oeuvre has inspired critique and even roasting; in 2016, NPR's Genevieve Valentine, writing a remembrance of Tepper, challenged readers to "explain any given plot point in a Tepper book and watch friends refuse to believe you." Other critiques have dismissed Tepper's work as popular entertainment sullied by her politics—making, according to one critic, even the apocalypse seem boring (though supporters praise the politics in the Arbai trilogy for condemning ecological violence and bigotry). One of the ideas presented in Grass that interested critics the most was the idea that, rather than being a gift to the cosmos, humanity might be better perceived as a virus. The novel was also praised for its narrative skill and lauded for the puzzles it allows its readers to solve.

== Awards ==
Grass was shortlisted for both the Hugo Award for Best Novel and Locus Award for Best Science Fiction Novel in 1990.

== Sequels ==
"Grass" was followed in the Arbai trilogy by Raising the Stones (set a thousand or so years later) and Sideshow (set even farther in the future). The evolving character of Marjorie Westriding continues in varying capacities through these subsequent novels.
