= Renée Marie Gouraud d'Ablancourt =

French SF writer

Renée Marie Gouraud d’Ablancourt
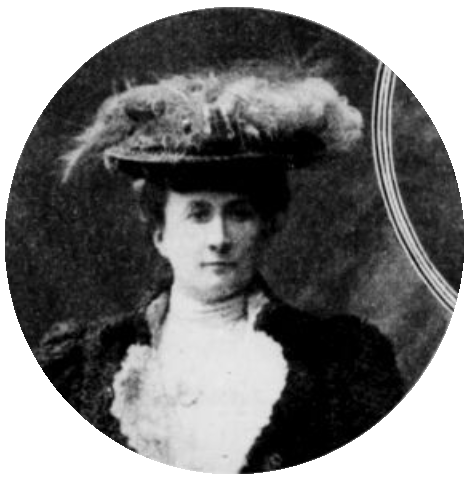
- Born: October 1, 1853; Angers
- Died: May 13, 1941 (aged 87); La Meignanne
- Other names: René d'Anjou
- Occupation: writer
- Known for: L'Oiselle
- Notable work: L'Oiselle

Renée Marie Gouraud d'Ablancourt, née Marie Renée Joséphine Meslet (October 1, 1853 – May 13, 1941), was a French writer of romance novels, historical fiction and science fiction.

She went by the pen name Renée Marie Gouraud d'Ablancourt, partly using her marital name (her spouse was Georges François Marie Lucien Gouraud en 1872) and partly her mother's (Julie Clotilde Emerance Perrot d'Ablancourt).

She also wrote under various pen names as René d'Anjou, Pierre d'Anjou or Perrot d'Blancourt, as a reference to her origins in the ancient County of Anjou.

== Biography ==
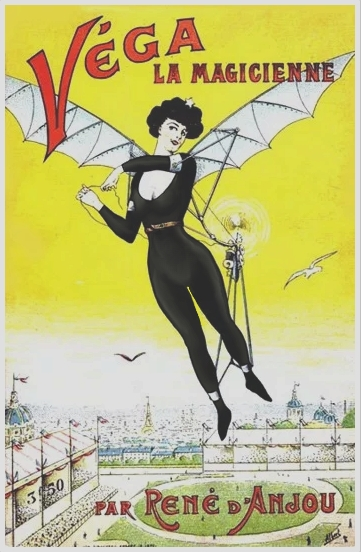
Véga la magicienne, the super heroine of L'Oiselle on the original cover of the 1912 edition.

Renée Marie Gouraud d'Ablancourt, whose birth name was Marie Renée Joséphine Meslet, was born on 1 October 1853 in Angers, at 3 de la Rue Belle-Poignée. Her parents were René François Meslet, a landowner from Savennières, and Julie Perrot d'Ablancourt, daughter of an officer of the army of Anjou, Jean Perrot d’Ablancourt. Renée d'Anjou started to write stories at age 14 or 15 and seems to have invented an aristocratic lineage for herself.

On 17 July 1872, Renée married Georges Gouraud (owner of Papeteries de Chantenay), a wealthy industrialist from Nantes. The couple first settled in Limoges before returning to live in Anjou, at the Château de La Filotière, which Renée was particularly fond of and where she would, much later, spend the rest of her life. They had four children: Renée (1873), Paul (1874), Marie Clotilde (1876) and Marie Cécile (1878).

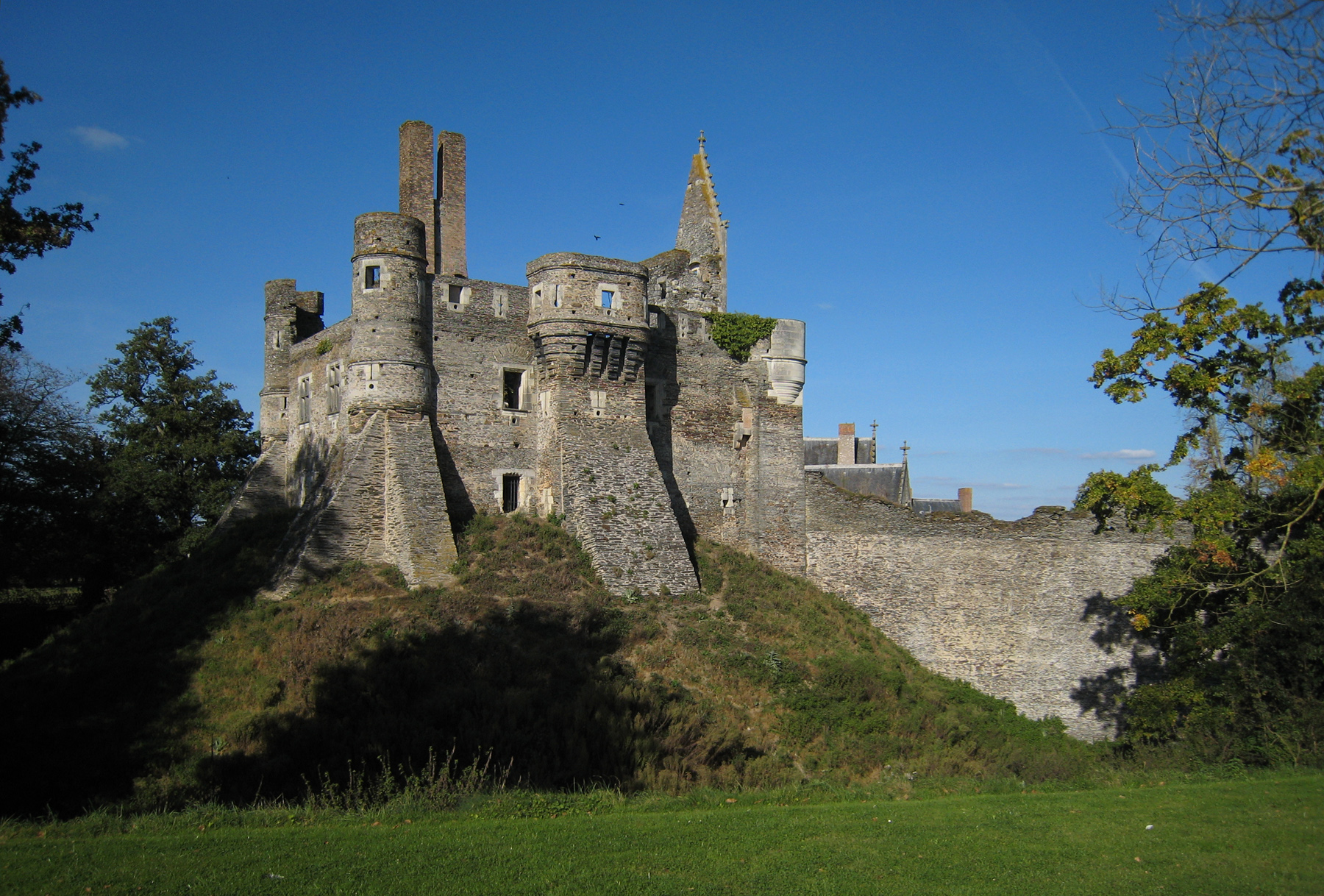
Castle Plessis Macé in 2007.

In 1888, the couple bought the Château du Plessis-Macé, in which they lived until 1908. The family also had a pied-à-terre in Paris and Renée became a very popular figure in Parisian society life. Thanks to the patronage of novelists Henri de Bornier and Eugène Muller, Renée Gouraud d'Ablancourt became a member of the Société des Gens de Lettres in 1899.

Renée Gouraud d'Ablancourt died on 13 May 1941 at the Château de La Filotière in La Meignanne.

== Popular fiction ==
Renée Gouraud d'Ablancourt published many short stories and popular novels, with Christian publishers, regional newspapers and fashion magazines. She was published by Hirt, La Librairie des saints pères, J. Siraudeau in Angers.

=== L'Oiselle, a French super hero ===
In 1909, she published the stories of L'Oiselle, or Véga de Ortega, in La Mode du Petit Journal (supplement). She was transformed into a superheroine by her Lady-Bird costume, a suit with artificial wings that allowed her to fly over Paris, where she carried out her adventures. She has a whole range of gadgets, including a night vision system and pills that kept her awake at night. Her stories were republished in 1912 under the title Véga la magicienne.

== See also ==
- L'Oiselle
- Feminist science fiction

== Bibliography ==
- Croquet, Pauline (2022-04-01). "Oubliée pendant un siècle, L'Oiselle, première superhéroïne française, reprend son envol". Le Monde.fr (in French).
- Nicolas-Delavigne, Françoise (2 April 2022). "Renée Marie Gouraud d'Ablancourt (1853-1941), une romancière angevine". Feuilles d'Ardoise.
- Reyns-Chikuma, Chris (2015-05-09). "Xavier Fournier, Super-héros: une histoire française". Belphégor. Littérature populaire et culture médiatique (in French) (13–1). doi:10.4000/belphegor.566. ISSN 1499-7185.
- Fournier, Xavier (2014). Super-héros: une histoire française. Paris San Francisco: Huginn & Muninn. ISBN 978-2-36480-127-1.

== Publications ==
- Reines et rois poètes et prisonniers (in French). [S. l. n. d: Le Petit écho de la Mode.
- La Voie mystérieuse. Collection des "Petits chefs d'œuvre" (in French). Paris: impr. de la Bourse de commerce.
- "La Jeune mère ou L'éducation du premier âge : journal illustré de l'enfance / rédacteur en chef le Dr Brochard,..." Gallica (in French). 1896-01-01.
- "La Jeune mère ou L'éducation du premier âge : journal illustré de l'enfance / rédacteur en chef le Dr Brochard,..." Gallica (in French). 1897.
- "Livre:Gouraud - Dieu et patrie, paru dans La Croix, 1897.djvu - Wikisource". fr.wikisource.org (in French).
- La Noble Bohême (in French). Paris: A. Pierret. 1898.
- Dieu et patrie. Bibliothèque de la bonne presse (in French). Paris: Maison de la bonne presse. 1899.
- Perrot d'Ablancourt (1899). Coeurs vaillants (in French). Paris: Maison de la bonne presse.
- Cruelles amours, par René d'Anjou (in French). Bordeaux: impr. de G. Gounouilhou. 1900.
- "Carnet de la femme : les femmes du XXe siècle". Gallica (in French). 1905-01-30.
- Intuitif amour, par René d'Anjou (in French). Paris: P. Orsoni. 1905.
- Véga la Magicienne (in French). Prodinnova. 2019-10-05. ISBN 978-3-96787-007-7.
