= The Fresco =

2000 novel by Sheri S. Tepper

- Paperback
- Author: Sheri S. Tepper
- Cover artist: Jean Targete
- Language: English
- Genre: Science fiction
- Publisher: Harper Voyager
- Publication date: 2000
- Publication place: United States
- Media type: Print (hardback and paperback) and ebook
- Pages: 416 (hardback)
- ISBN: 0380978792 (hardback)

The Fresco is a science fiction novel by American writer Sheri S. Tepper, published in 2000. It describes Earth's contact with a confederation of intelligent alien races. The Fresco was on the shortlist ("honor list") for 2001 James Tiptree, Jr. Award

== Plot ==
Multiple alien races have discovered Earth. Two members of one of those races, “Chiddy” and “Vess” of the Pistach, approach Benita Alvarez-Shipton and ask her to carry a device to the authorities that will communicate their message. Benita uses this as an opportunity to escape her abusive husband. The device ultimately reaches the U. S. President, and the Pistach envoys arrange a personal meeting with him.

Having noticed Earth's forays into space, the Pistach envoys have been sent to evaluate Earth for membership in a confederation of intelligent races. Failing to qualify for membership exposes Earth to sequestration from space travel and predation by the three other races that have become aware of Earth. The envoys point out some issues that Earth needs to resolve and then take various actions to assist with those problems. The envoys also insist that Benita act as their official intermediary.

Throughout the book, one of the envoys, Chiddy, explains the history of Pistach and their religion in journal entries. The Pistach religion and way of life are driven by the stories revealed in the eponymous Fresco, a series of seventeen painted panels. Age and soot and grime have darkened the panels beyond recognition, so the Pistach rely on a book known as the Compendium which contains annotated copies of the Fresco panels.

When rebel Pistach take possession of the Fresco and clean the panels, it is revealed that the stories told in the Compendium are contradicted by the actual paintings, threatening the entire body of principles on which Pistach society is based. To prevent the Pistach from withdrawing their protection of Earth, Benita and a group of artists from Earth put the Pistach to sleep with sarsparilla and secretly repaint the panels to be in accordance with the Compendium. The changes to the panels are acclaimed a miracle. Inspired, Chiddy and Vess continue to help Earth and teach them to be neighborly.

One year later, Benita is granted a divorce from her husband by the president and marries Chiddy, who had fallen in love with her throughout the book.

== Theme ==
Tepper uses the contrasts between Earth religions and the Pistach religion to explore the emergence of male-dominated religions. In Aliens in Popular Culture, Edward James observes that Tepper's satire explores the "take me to your leader" trope.

== Reception ==
Library Journal notes "Tepper's talent for creating believable human and alien characters lends power and credibility to her work and makes her a convincing portrayer of sociologically oriented sf." Booklist states that the latter half of the book "stretches the limits of credibility" but concludes that "she has created an overwhelmingly detailed scenario for humanity's first contact with aliens." Kirkus describes it as "consummately skillful, wise, sometimes hilarious, iconoclastic performance, although possibly too relentlessly polemical".
