= Sheri S. Tepper =

American science fiction, horror and mystery novelist (1929–2016)

- Born: Shirley Stewart Douglas; July 16, 1929 near Littleton, Colorado, U.S.
- Died: October 22, 2016 (aged 87); Santa Fe, New Mexico, U.S.
- Writing career
- Genres: Horror, mystery fiction, feminist science fiction
- Notable works: The Gate to Women's Country, Beauty, Grass
- Notable awards: World Fantasy Award for Life Achievement, Locus Award in 1992 for Beauty

Sheri Stewart Tepper (July 16, 1929 – October 22, 2016) was an American writer of science fiction, horror and mystery novels. She is primarily known for her feminist science fiction, which explored themes of sociology, gender and equality, as well as theology and ecology. Often referred to as an eco-feminist of science fiction literature, Tepper personally preferred the label eco-humanist. Some of her novels fall into the category of climate fiction, in which the changing environment of a planet affects the life of its colonists (or vice versa) in the form of a mystery to be solved; examples include Grass (1989), Beauty (1991), A Plague of Angels (1993), The Family Tree (1997), Six Moon Dance (1998), and Singer from the Sea (1999). Though the majority of her works operate in a world of fantastical imagery and metaphor, at the heart of her writing is real-world injustice and pain. She employed several pen names during her lifetime, including A. J. Orde, E. E. Horlak, and B. J. Oliphant.

== Biography ==
She was born Shirley Stewart Douglas near Littleton, Colorado. As a child, she read science fiction and fantasy by A. Merritt and C. S. Lewis, as well as Frank Baum's 'Oz' books, William Hope Hodgson's The Night Land and Islandia by Austin Tappan Wright. She later commented, "These were the books I went back to again and again."

Tepper recalled that she "spent ten years ... working all kinds of different jobs" as a single mother of two. This included time working as a clerical assistant for the international relief agency, CARE. From 1962 to 1986, she worked for Rocky Mountain Planned Parenthood, eventually as its executive director.

She wrote poetry and children's stories as Sheri S. Eberhart, then took a break from writing. She published her first novels after she turned 50.

By the mid-1980s, she was publishing science fiction novels, including The Revenants (1984), and the books of the True Game series, including King's Blood Four (1983), Necromancer Nine (1983), and Wizard's Eleven (1984). Other related works followed, including her ecofeminist novels The Gate to Women's Country (1988) and Grass (1989), which is part of the Arbai Trilogy. Later novels in the 1990s and 2000s included Beauty (1991), which won a Locus Award; Shadow's End (1994); The Family Tree (1997); Six Moon Dance (1998); Singer from the Sea (1999); The Visitor (2002); The Companions (2003); and The Margarets (2007).

As of 1998, she operated a guest ranch near Santa Fe, New Mexico. That year saw her first and possibly only appearance at a science fiction convention, when she was Guest of Honor at the 25th WisCon, the feminist science fiction convention held annually in Madison, Wisconsin.

In November 2015, Tepper received the World Fantasy Award for Life Achievement. Her fantasy novel Beauty won a Locus Award in 1992.

== Personal life ==
Tepper married in her 20s and had two children. In the late 1960s, about 10 years after her divorce, she was married to Gene Tepper.

She died on October 22, 2016 at age 87.

== Awards ==
Work	Year & Award	Category	Result
	2015 World Fantasy Award	Life Achievement	Won
King's Blood Four	1984 Locus Awards	First Novel	Nominated
The Song of Mavin Manyshaped	1986 Locus Awards	Fantasy Novel	Nominated
Marianne, the Magus, and the Manticore	1986 Locus Awards	Fantasy Novel	Nominated
Jinian Star-Eye	1987 Locus Awards	Fantasy Novel	Nominated
The Awakeners	1988 Locus Awards	Science Fiction Novel	Nominated
After Long Silence	1988 Locus Awards	Science Fiction Novel	Nominated
The Gate to Women's Country	1989 Locus Awards	Science Fiction Novel	Nominated
"The Gardener" (Night Visions 6)	1989 World Fantasy Awards	Novella	Nominated
Marianne, the Matchbox, and the Malachite Mouse	1990 Locus Awards	Fantasy Novel	Nominated
Grass	1990 Hugo Awards	Novel	Nominated
Grass	1990 Locus Awards	Science Fiction Novel	Nominated
Raising the Stones	1991 Locus Awards	Science Fiction Novel	Nominated
Beauty	1992 Locus Awards	Fantasy Novel	Won
Sideshow	1993 John W. Campbell Memorial Award		2nd place
Sideshow	1993 Locus Awards	Science Fiction Novel	Nominated
A Plague of Angels	1994 James Tiptree Jr. Memorial Award		long list
A Plague of Angels	1994 Locus Awards	Science Fiction Novel	Nominated
Shadow's End	1995 James Tiptree Jr. Memorial Award		long list
Shadow's End	1995 Locus Awards	Science Fiction Novel	Nominated
Gibbon's Decline and Fall	1997 Arthur C. Clarke Award		shortlist
Gibbon's Decline and Fall	1997 James Tiptree Jr. Memorial Award		long list
Gibbon's Decline and Fall	1997 Locus Awards	Science Fiction Novel	Nominated
The Family Tree	1998 Arthur C. Clarke Award		shortlist
The Family Tree	1998 Locus Awards	Science Fiction Novel	Nominated
Six Moon Dance	1999 James Tiptree Jr. Memorial Award		long list
Six Moon Dance	1999 Locus Awards	Science Fiction Novel	Nominated
Singer from the Sea	2000 James Tiptree Jr. Memorial Award		long list
Singer from the Sea	2000 Locus Awards	Science Fiction Novel	Nominated
The Fresco	2002 James Tiptree Jr. Memorial Award		short list
The Fresco	2001 John W. Campbell Memorial Award		third place
The Fresco	2001 Locus Awards	Science Fiction Novel	Nominated
The Visitor	2003 John W. Campbell Memorial Award		finalist
The Visitor	2003 Locus Awards	Science Fiction Novel	Nominated
The Companions	2004 John W. Campbell Memorial Award		finalist
The Margarets	2009 Arthur C. Clarke Award		shortlist
The Margarets	2008 James Tiptree Jr. Memorial Award		honor list
The Margarets	2008 John W. Campbell Memorial Award		finalist
The Waters Rising	2012 Arthur C. Clarke Award		shortlist
The Waters Rising	2011 John W. Campbell Memorial Award		finalist

== Works ==
=== Novels ===
==== Series ====
- The True Game (a trilogy of trilogies)
  - The Peter series was the first published. The Mavin series takes place earlier. The Jinian series takes place during and after the same time period as the Peter series, often giving a different perspective on the same events.
    - This series has a crossover with the Plague of Angels series.
  - The Books of the True Game: Peter
    - King's Blood Four (Ace Books, 1983) (first novel)
    - Necromancer Nine (Ace Books, 1983)
    - Wizard's Eleven (Ace Books, 1984)
      - The True Game (omnibus edition) (1985)
  - The Books of the True Game: Mavin Manyshaped
    - The Song of Mavin Manyshaped (Ace Books, 1985)
    - The Flight of Mavin Manyshaped (Ace Books, 1985)
    - The Search of Mavin Manyshaped (Ace Books, 1985)
      - The Chronicles of Mavin Manyshaped (omnibus edition) (1985)
  - The Books of the True Game: Jinian
    - Jinian Footseer (Tor Books, 1985)
    - Dervish Daughter (Tor Books, 1986)
    - Jinian Star-Eye (Tor Books, 1986)
      - The End of the Game (omnibus edition)
- The Marianne Trilogy
  - Marianne, the Magus, and the Manticore (Ace Books, 1985)
  - Marianne, the Madame, and the Momentary Gods (Ace Books, 1988)
  - Marianne, the Matchbox, and the Malachite Mouse (Ace Books, 1989)
    - The Marianne Trilogy (omnibus edition)
- Ettison Duo, featuring Badger Ettison
  - Blood Heritage (Tor Books, 1986)
  - The Bones (Tor Books, 1987)
- The Awakeners:
  - Northshore (Tor Books, 1987)
  - Southshore (Tor Books, 1987)
    - The Awakeners (omnibus edition, 1989. A later omnibus edition erroneously claims to be first)
- Plague of Angels:
  - A Plague of Angels (Bantam, 1993)
  - The Waters Rising (Eos, 2010) - Arthur C. Clarke Award nominee, 2010
  - Fish Tails (2014), a crossover into the True Game series
- The Arbai Trilogy
  - Grass (Doubleday, 1989) – Hugo and Locus Awards nominee, 1990
  - Raising the Stones (Doubleday, 1990)
  - Sideshow (Doubleday, 1992) – John W. Campbell Award nominee, 1993

==== Non-series ====
- The Revenants (Berkley Publishing, 1984)
- After Long Silence (1987) (UK: The Enigma Score, 1989)
- The Gate to Women's Country (1988)
- Beauty (Doubleday, 1991; revised UK edition is author's preferred text) – Winner, Locus Award for Best Fantasy Novel, 1992
- Shadow's End (1994)
- Gibbon's Decline & Fall (1996) – Arthur C. Clarke Award nominee, 1997
- The Family Tree (1997) – Arthur C. Clarke Award nominee, 1998
- Six Moon Dance (1998)
- Singer from the Sea (1999)
- The Fresco (2000) – John W. Campbell Memorial Award nominee, 2001
- The Visitor (2002) – John W. Campbell Memorial Award nominee, 2003
- The Companions (2003) – John W. Campbell Memorial Award nominee, 2004
- The Margarets (released June 1, 2007 by Eos) – John W. Campbell Memorial Award nominee, 2008; Arthur C. Clarke Award nominee, 2009

=== Short works ===
- "The Gardener" (novella) in Night Visions 6. Released as The Bone Yard (1988) in mass market. Collaboration with F. Paul Wilson and Ray Garton. World Fantasy Award—Long Fiction finalist (1989)
- "Someone Like You" in The Further Adventures of the Joker (ed. Martin Greenberg) (1990)
- The "Crazy" Carol Stories
  - "The Gazebo" in The Magazine of Fantasy & Science Fiction, October 1990
  - "Raccoon Music" in The Magazine of Fantasy & Science Fiction, February 1991
  - "The Gourmet" in The Magazine of Fantasy & Science Fiction, October/November 1991

=== Poetry ===
- "Extraterrestrial Trilogue on Terran Self-Destruction" in Galaxy, August 1961 (as Sheri S. Eberhart)
- "Lullaby, 1990" in Galaxy, December 1963 (as Sheri S. Eberhart)
- "Ballad of the Interstellar Merchants" in Galaxy, December 1964 (as Sheri S. Eberhart)

=== Essays/articles ===
Educational pamphlets for Rocky Mountain Planned Parenthood:

- The People Know (1968)
- The Perils of Puberty (1974)
- The Problem with Puberty (1976)
- This Is You (1977)
- So Your Happily Ever After Isn't (1977)
- The Great Orgasm Robbery (1977)
- So You Don't Want to Be a Sex Object (1978)

=== Pseudonymous works ===
- as E. E. Horlak (horror):
  - Still Life (Bantam, 1987/1988)
- as B. J. Oliphant (mystery):
  - Shirley McClintock Mysteries, featuring a Colorado rancher and former Washington, DC "advisor":
    - Dead in the Scrub (1990)
    - The Unexpected Corpse (1990)
    - Deservedly Dead (1992)
    - Death and the Delinquent (1993)
    - Death Served Up Cold (1994)
    - A Ceremonial Death (1996)
    - Here's to the Newly Dead (1997)
- as A. J. Orde (mystery):
  - The Jason Lynx Mysteries, featuring a Colorado antiques dealer and his significant other, a female cop:
    - A Little Neighborhood Murder: A Jason Lynx Novel (1989)
    - Death and the Dogwalker: A Jason Lynx Novel (1990)
    - Death for Old Time's Sake: A Jason Lynx Novel (1992)
    - Looking for the Aardvark (1993) (also published in paperback as Dead on Sunday, 1994)
    - A Long Time Dead (Fawcett, 1994)
    - A Death of Innocents: A Jason Lynx Novel (1996, 1997)
