= The Gate to Women's Country =

1988 novel by Sheri S. Tepper

- Cover for the 1988 first printing, by Rafał Olbiński.
- Author: Sheri S. Tepper
- Cover artist: Rafał Olbiński
- Genre: post-apocalyptic science fiction
- Publisher: Doubleday
- Publication date: 1988
- Pages: 278
- ISBN: 0385247095 American first ed.
- OCLC: 759887784

The Gate to Women's Country is a post-apocalyptic novel by American writer Sheri S. Tepper, published in 1988. It describes a world set three hundred years into the future after a catastrophic war which has fractured the United States into several nations.

== Setting ==
The story is set in "Women's Country", apparently in the former Pacific Northwest. They have evolved in the direction of Ecotopia, reverting to a sustainable economy based on small cities and low-tech local agriculture. They have also developed a matriarchy where the women and children live within town walls with a small number of male servitors, and most of the men live outside the town in warrior camps.

== Plot ==
The Gate to Women's Country is set in the future, 300 years after a nuclear war destroyed most of human civilization. The book focuses on a matriarchal nation known as Women's Country, and particularly the city of Marthatown.

Stavia, the novel's hero, is the younger daughter of Morgot, an important member of the Marthatown Council. The book opens with Stavia as an adult, heading to meet her fifteen-year-old son, Dawid. He has spent the last ten years living outside the city walls with the warriors, as is customary for Women's Country boys, and is now old enough to decide whether he wishes to remain a warrior or accept a life of study and service among the women as a servitor. At the meeting Dawid formally renounces his mother and chooses to become a full-fledged warrior. Stavia also renounces Dawid.

Afterwards, Stavia remembers when her younger brother was sent to live with the warriors. Much of the rest of the novel is told in flashback, following Stavia's life from childhood to adulthood. In the story's present, Stavia prepares for her role as Iphigenia in Marthatown's annual performance of Iphigenia at Ilium, a reworking of the Greek tragedy The Trojan Women that weaves through the novel as a leitmotif.

While still a child, Stavia met Chernon, the son of one of her mother's friends. Although Chernon lives in the garrison with the other boys and men, he and Stavia form a friendship. They meet at the twice-annual Carnival, the only event in Women's Country where warriors and women can mix freely and during which time boys who have not yet chosen to become warriors can visit their families. Stavia eventually agrees to smuggle books to Chernon for him to read, even though this is forbidden for boys in the garrison.

In fact, Chernon has been ordered by his commander, Michael, to learn more about the secrets of the women who rule Women's Country. After confessing to breaking the ordinances, Stavia is sent away from Marthatown for several years to train as a doctor. On her return, Chernon pursues their relationship again. When Stavia is selected for an exploration mission to the south, Chernon leaves the garrison (on Michael's orders), meets her there, and rapes her.

While away from Women's Country, Stavia and Chernon are captured by a band of "Holylanders", members of a struggling community to the south of Women's Country. They practice polygamy and a fundamentalist patriarchy with Christian underpinnings. The Holylanders are brutally misogynistic, treating women as slaves to their husbands, and children (both sons and daughters) are subject to severe corporal punishment which they term 'chastisement'. Chernon betrays Stavia after their capture, during which time she realizes she is pregnant by Chernon. She makes an escape attempt, and is struck a blow to the head and incapacitated.

Upon her return to Women's Country, she finally learns the secrets of the Women's Country Council and the choices they have made to preserve their way of life. The secret of Women's Country is that the council has been engaged in a selective breeding program with the population, using select servitors to propagate desirable traits through artificial insemination amongst select women; additionally selective sterilization has been used among the women. Chernon also is changed by his experiences, and returns to his garrison promoting the ways of the Holylanders as an alternative to their current societal structure. The Marthatown garrison is soon sent to battle against another Women's Country city, and no survivors return.

== Major themes ==
The story explores many elements from ecofeminism, which has been a hallmark of much of Tepper's writing, both in her feminist science fiction and in her pseudonymous mysteries.

The question of the causes of human violence is also a major theme, and in the novel Stavia's society hopes they are successfully breeding violence out of humanity. In the novel, violence appears to be biologically determined. By selecting only nonviolent individuals to breed, society is slowly increasing the number of such nonviolent members.

Tepper is careful to demonstrate that it is only unreasoning violence, not the ability to learn to fight and defend oneself and others, that is being bred out. For instance, she shows the servitor Joshua and Morgot as skilled fighters—so skilled they are able to defeat the men who have trained as fighters their entire lives. So it is clear that it is only certain personality traits—violence, especially in men—that is being weeded out. Women are also given hysterectomies and tubal ligations at the discretion of the medical officers.

The biological determinism of Tepper's world also controls sexuality, and the novel constructs homosexuality as a genetic and hormonal disorder which has been eugenically removed from the population. Jane Donawerth describes Tepper's approach as a "chillingly homophobic solution". Tepper thus illustrates a world approaching a feminist utopia through the vision of a powerful leadership who impose rigid behavioral control on their society, and engineer the removal of those traits they consider undesirable (mainly violence) through forced sterilization. Their world remains vulnerable to ideological attack, as can be seen by the plots of the garrisons to take over the women's cities every generation and to force the women to serve them, as well as in Chernon's susceptibility to the violently misogynist ideology of the Holylanders. However, the Council's decision to interfere with its citizens' reproduction, without their consent or knowledge, is shown as a serious ethical issue—a "damned" choice as described by one of the leaders.

== See also ==
- Eugenics
- Selective breeding
- The Fifth Sacred Thing
- Eleanor Arnason, a contemporary science fiction author who explored similar themes in her Hwarhath series
