= Rosa Rosà =

Austrian writer

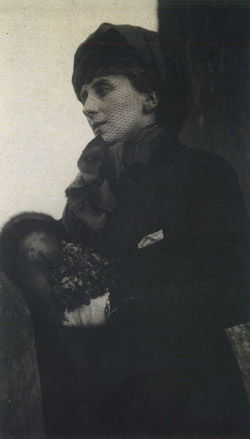
- Rosa Rosà ca. 1930—1940
- Born: Edyth von Haynau; 1884; Vienna
- Died: 1978 (aged 93–94)
- Writing career
- Literary movement: Futurist movement

Rosa Rosà (born Edyth von Haynau; 1884–1978) was a writer and author associated with the inter-war Italian Futurist movement (the art and social movement, which is not to be confused with the field of futurist studies and ideas also known as futurology). She is renowned for her first short novel, Una donna con tre anime (A Woman with Three Souls, 1918).

== Biography ==
=== Early life ===
Rosa Rosà was born as in 1884 in Vienna as Baroness Edyth (also written Edith) von Haynau to a conservative aristocratic Austrian family. Rosà was educated in Vienna and she quickly developed a passion for drawing. Against the desires of her family, Rosà enrolled in the Wiener Kunstschule für Frauen und Mädchen, where she studied art for two years. In 1907, Rosà met Ulrico Arnaldi, an Italian journalist for La Tribuna; the couple married in 1908, moved to Rome, and had four children by 1915.

=== Engagement with futurism ===
When her husband was enlisted in World War I, Rosà was introduced to Futurism by its leader, Filippo Tommaso Marinetti, and soon began to engage with the movement. At this time, Edyth changed her name to "Rosa Rosà." She chose the name "Rosà" for its symbolic qualities; the name came from a town on the Austrian-Italian border, which at several points in its history was ruled by both countries. The town of Rosà's dual identity reflected that within the writer. Additionally, Rosà doubled the name (and lost the accent on the first name, "Rosa") to express this dual identity and to engage with Futurist ideas of movement, while simultaneously punning on the traditional female name, "Rose/Rosa."

During the war, Rosà began to write in Italian for the Futurist journal L'Italia Futurista, where she published a myriad of articles, black and white drawings, short poems, and poetry. These productions engaged with Futurist aesthetic and philosophical theories, and oftentimes critiqued their misogyny. As such, Rosa is acknowledged for her feminist contributions to the movement, especially in relation to her first novel, Una donna con tre anime (A Woman with Three Souls, 1918).

=== Life post-Futurism ===
In 1920, Rosà left the Futurist movement due to her objections to the group's growing Fascist inclinations. After leaving the group, Rosa continued to produce artworks, however she transitioned to painting, textile, and sculpture. Between 1919 and 1922, Rosà was exhibited in two Futurist exhibitions and had her own show at a Roman gallery (see section titled: "Artistic Production: Artworks, Exhibitions"). Rosa continued to produce writings and artworks until her death in 1978.

== Quotes ==
- “…women are about to conquer something new…the consciousness of a free and immortal ‘I’ which owes nothing to anybody or anything.” -Rosa Rosà (1917)
- "Giorgina Rossi was young, but her youth was starting to collect dust...One could say that Nature wanted her to be average in every way...He [Alberto Boni] turned around instinctively to stare at his neighbor [Giorgina]...It was difficult to say exactly what this change was...Her face glowed with a new light typical of those who live life with great intensity. A new vitality gave her body and movements grace and elasticity, conveying the fresh exuberance of her new personality...the suddenly revealed femininity." (Una donna con tre anime, 1918, pages 1, 8)
- "That strange soul invading her being with such overwhelming force, had traits and tendencies that could not have been further removed from the way Giorgina used to be. A feeling of insufferable boredom, monotony, and immobility drove her to crave even an unpleasant experience just so that there could at least be a change. A new lucidity and mental vivacity urged her brain to address problems and explore possibilities she had never imagined before." (Una donna con tre anime, 1918, page 10)
- "Every moral scruple had vanished from her soul. Her bourgeois consciousness has effectively shattered." (Una donna con tre anime, 1918, page 14)
- "'You're too human, you're too human. Purify yourself.'" -Giorgina Rossi to Umberto Rossi [Giorgina's husband] (Una donna con tre anime, 1918, page 20)
- "'All three are examples of how the life of woman will be in the future...In fact, we have a vision of a female life reaching out in a mystic leap towards a symbol of unreality...fragments of pulverized futures...Since this future is probably closer than we think, it will be necessary to prepare ourselves for a complete change in all the moral and legal codes that have regulated our Society thus far...so the world is well aware of its [the world's] evolutionary destiny.'" (Una donna con tre anime, 1918, pages 22–23)

== Artistic production ==
=== Writing ===
==== L'Italia Futurista articles, stand-alone illustrations, and poems/short stories ====
Rosa was an active author in the Futurist journal, L'Italia Futurista. Most of her writings address the role of women in the Futurist context and explore Futurist ideas, such as the role of science in modernity. Rosa helped to establish a feminist branch of Futurism.

- 1917: "Multitudine" ("Multitude," short story)
- 1917: "Romanticismo sonnambulo" ("Sleepwalking Romanticism," short story)
- 1917: Conflagrazione geometrica (Geometric Conflagration, black and white ink drawing)
- 1917: "Ricevimento-thé, signore-nessun uomo" ("Reception-tea-ladies-no men," free word visual poem; accompanied Conflagrazione geometrica)
- 1917: "Le donne del posdomani" ("The Women of the Day After Tomorrow," 7 October 1917, her last article in this publication)

==== Novels ====
- 1918: Una donna con tre anime (A Woman with Three Souls)
- 1919: Non c’è che te! Una donna con tre anime e altre novelle (There is Nothing But You! A Woman with Three Souls and Other Stories)

=== Artwork ===
==== Illustrations ====
- 1917: Sam Dunn è morto (Sam Dunn is Dead), text by Bruno Corra
- 1918: Notti Filtrate (Filtered Nights), text by Mario Carli
  - Click this following link to view Rosa's illustrations in situ: https://monoskop.org/images/7/70/Notti_filtrate_1918.pdf
- 1919: Madrigali e grotteschi (Madrigals and Grotesques), text by Bruno Corra
- 1919: Le locomotive con le calze (Locomotives with Stockings), text by Arnaldo Ginna

==== Exhibitions ====
Rosa produced abstract artworks, fabrics, and ceramics, in addition to her black and white illustrations (the medium she preferred to work in).

- 1919: Grande Esposizione Nazionale Futurista (Milan-Genoa-Florence)
- 1921: Exhibition at the Lyceum (Rome)
- 1922: International Futurist Exhibition (Berlin)

==== Disclaimer ====
All of Rosà's known drawings were published in Futurist journals and novels. As such, very few if any of her artworks are on display in museums, however, some may be stored in Italian archives. Many of the novels she illustrated are still in print and as such, so are her illustrations.

== Scholarly reception ==
=== English-speaking ===
==== Summary ====
Scholars such as Lucia Re, Ursula Fanning, and Sharon Wood mainly focus on Rosa's role as a feminist writer and theorist within the Futurist context. Furthermore, most of the scholarship on Rosa examines her responses to Marinetti's Come si seducono le donne (How to Seduce Women, 1917), which were published both in L'Italia Futurista and her first short novel, Una donna con tre anime (A Woman with Three Souls, 1918). The most-renowned and influential scholar on Rosa Rosà in both English-speaking and Italian-speaking scholarship is Lucia Re. Lucia Re is currently a professor of Italian and Gender Studies (in their respective departments) at UCLA. Re focuses on the intersection of contemporary literature, feminist theory, and futurism/avant-garde in the artistic outputs of women writers and artists.

==== Bibliography ====
- Bentivoglio, Mirella and Franca Zoccoli. The Women Artists of Italian Futurism—Almost Lost to History. New York: Midmarch Arts Press, 1997.
- Berghaus, Günter, ed. International Futurism in Arts and Literature. Berlin: Walter de Gruyter, 2000.
- Fanning, Ursula. “Futurism and the Abjection of the Feminine.” Futurismo: Impact and Legacy (2011). https://researchrepository.ucd.ie/bitstream/10197/3051/1/Futurism%20and%20the%20Abjection%20of%20the%20Feminine.pdf.
- Greene, Vivien, ed. Italian Futurism 1909–1944: Reconstructing the Universe. New York: Guggenheim Museum Publications, 2014.
- Hanstein, Lisa. “Edyth von Haynau: A Viennese Aristocrat in the Futurist Circles of the 1910s.” International Yearbook of Futurism Studies, Special Issue: Women Artists and Futurism 5 (2015): 333–365.
- Katz, Barry. “The Women of Futurism.” A Woman’s Art Journal 2 (1999): 3–13.
- Panizanna, Letizia and Sharon Wood, eds. A History of Women’s Writings in Italy. Cambridge: Cambridge University Press, 2000.
- Parati, Graziella and Rebecca West, eds. Italian Feminist Theory and Practice: Equality and Sexual Difference. London: Associated University Presses, 2002.
- Pickering-Lazzi, Robin, ed. Mothers of Invention: Women, Italian Fascism, and Culture. Minneapolis, MN: University of Minneapolis Press, 1995.
- Re, Lucia. “Futurism and Feminism.” Annali d’Itaianistica 7 (1989): 253–72.
- Re, Lucia. Introduction to “A Woman with Three Souls.” California Italian Studies 2, no. 1 (2011). https://escholarship.org/uc/item/7k625747#main.
- Russell, Rinaldina, ed. Italian Women Writers: A Bio-bibliographical Sourcebook. London: Greenwood Press, 1994. (353–360)

=== Italian-speaking ===
==== Bibliography ====
- Marola, Barbara, ed. Fuori norma, Scrittrici italiane del primo Novecento: Vittoria Aganoor, Paola Drigo, Rosa Rosà, Lina Pietravalle. Ferrara : L. Tufani, impr. 2003.
- Re, Lucia. “Scitture della metamorfosi e metamorfosi della sciturra: Rosa Rosà e il futurismo.” In Les femmes écrivains en Italie (1870–1920): ordres et libertés, edited by Emmanuelle Genevois, 311-27. Paris: Université de la Sorbonne nouvelle, 1994.
- Salaris, Claudia, ed. “Le futuriste: Donne e letteratura d’avanguardia.” In Italia. Milano: Edizioni delle donne, 1982.
- Vergine, Lea, ed. “Rosa Rosà.” In L’altra metà dell’avanguardia. Milano: G. Mazzotta, 1980.
