= The True Game =

Fantasy novel series by Sheri S. Tepper

The True Game is the collective name for a series of three related trilogies of short novels by Sheri S. Tepper. The novels explore the Lands of the True Game, a portion of a planet explored by humanity somewhere in the future. These novels straddle the genres of both fantasy and science-fiction, although this does not become apparent until quite late in the overall story.

Each of the trilogies focuses on the point of view of one particular character. The Peter trilogy tells the story from the point of view of Peter, a shape-shifting youth. The Mavin series tells an earlier portion of the story from the point of view of Mavin Manyshaped, Peter's shape-shifting mother. The Jinian series overlaps with and extends the Peter series and tells the story from the point of view of Jinian, a young wizardly woman.

== Books in series ==
=== Peter series ===
- King's Blood Four (Ace Books, 1983) (first novel)
- Necromancer Nine (Ace Books, 1983)
- Wizard's Eleven (Ace Books, 1984)

The stories were subsequently collected into a one-volume edition titled The True Game (1985).

=== Mavin Manyshaped series ===
- The Song of Mavin Manyshaped (Ace Books, 1985)
- The Flight of Mavin Manyshaped (Ace Books, 1985)
- The Search of Mavin Manyshaped (Ace Books, 1985)

The stories were subsequently collected into a one-volume edition titled The Chronicles of Mavin Manyshaped (1985).

=== Jinian series ===
- Jinian Footseer (Tor Books, 1985)
- Dervish Daughter (Tor Books, 1986)
- Jinian Star-Eye (Tor Books, 1986)

The stories were subsequently collected into a one-volume edition titled The End of the Game (Nelson Doubleday, 1986).

== Talents ==
Within the Lands of the True Game, humans have come to possess "talents".

- Shapeshifting (shifters)
- The ability to see the future (seers)
- Telekinesis (tragamors)
- Self-levitation (armigers)
- Self-teleportation (elators)
- The ability to heal the sick or wounded (healers)
- The ability to raise the dead (necromancers)
- Telepathy (demons)
- Pyrokinesis (sentinels)
- The ability to store power for use by the other talents (sorcerers)
- The ability to beguile others into following them (Rulers)

An additional group of humans known as the immutables has the ability to quench any of these talents while another group of humans, the wizards, has the ability to use magic/technology to produce effective results. Wizardry is learned, rather than appearing in adolescence as a talent does. Having any other talent does not negate wizardry. The so-called "thirteenth talent" was confirmed only to be possessed by one person, and was the ability to link with others and utilise or combine their talents.

Other humans are just ordinary humans and are referred to as pawns.

For the most part, the talented humans live in groups called demesnes and the demesnes are constantly warring with each other in great games. In the process, as usually occurs with wars, death and destruction and waste occurs, especially among the pawns. The stories examine the morality of the so-called True Game and other related issues.

As time goes on, the earlier history of humans on the planet and even to the creatures who occupied the planet prior to the arrival of the humans (and who are now much-diminished as a result of human colonization) is introduced. Ultimately, the story deals with the question of whether life on the planet will survive at all.

== Reception ==
Orson Scott Card reported that the series came to "a powerful, illuminating conclusion that lifts this story out of the ranks of grunting blood-and-thunder adventure and into the heady realm of thoughtful, entertaining science fiction."
