= Gather the Daughters =

2017 science-fiction novel by Jennie Melamed

- First edition
- Author: Jennie Melamed
- Language: English
- Genre: Science Fiction
- Publisher: Little, Brown and Company
- Publication date: 2017
- Pages: 341
- ISBN: 0316501409

Gather the Daughters is a 2017 science-fiction novel by Jennie Melamed. The novel received positive reviews and was nominated for the 2018 Arthur C. Clarke Award.
