= L'Oiselle =

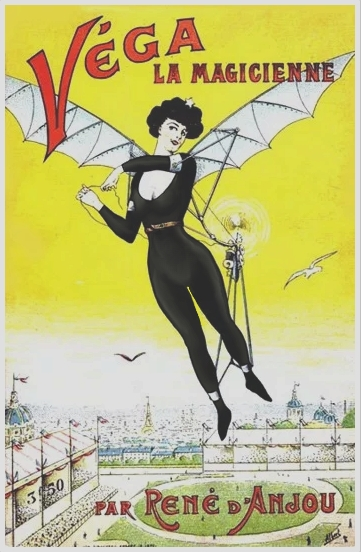
- L'Oiselle
- First appearance: L'Oiselle ou Royale énigme (July 1909)
- Created by: Renée Marie Gouraud d'Ablancourt

In-universe information
- Gender: Female
- Occupation: Superhero
- Nationality: French

L'Oiselle (French for "The female Bird") is a fictional woman created by Renée Marie Gouraud dʻAblancourt under the name René d'Anjou, whose literary adventures were first published in the serial novel L'Oiselle ou Royale énigme in the women's weekly La Mode du Petit Journal in 1909.

Thanks to her costume that allows her to fly, she is capable of real aerial prowess that she puts at the service of the organization "Les Compagnons de l'Étoile Noire". This character, a true first superheroïne, uses her technology to put an end to the actions of a criminal organization.

== Inspiration ==
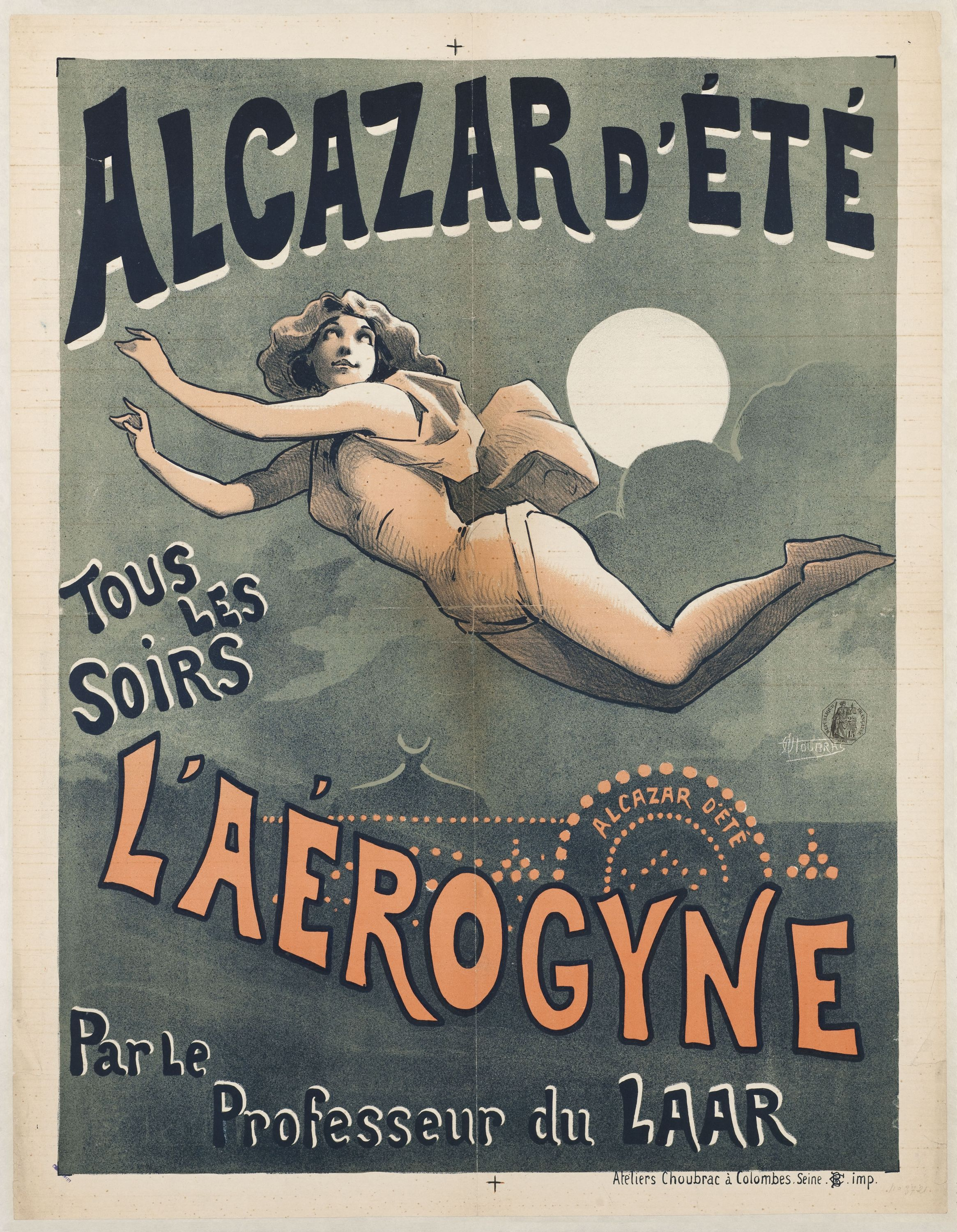
Aérogyne at the summer Alcazar, poster by Alfred Choubrac, Musée Carnavalet, ca. 1880–1900

From the end of the nineteenth century, a new fashion spread in Parisian cabarets: shows of flying women. Establishments like the Alcazar, the Folies Bergère, the Amphitheatre, proposed performances of dancers who, by means of cables or optical effects, rose a few meters in the air. In 1902, the film director Georges Meliès directed La Femme volante, a film in which the heroine alternates between dancing choreographies and flying scenes.

== Publications ==
The adventures of the Oiselle written by the novelist Renée Gouraud d'Ablancourt, alias René d'Anjou, appeared for the first time in serial form in La Mode du Petit Journal from July 18, 1909, under the title L'Oiselle ou Royale énigme. The story was again published in serial form under the title Véga la magicienne in L'Indépendant du Cher starting August 17, 1911. Finally, the novel was published in hardback the following year by J. Siraudeau with some variants.

The adventures of the Oiselle, which tell the story of a young woman of eighteen capable of flying, of chasing thieves, and also of rescuing a man, attracted to René d'Anjou a certain number of critics, in particular of the Catholic press which criticized a disruption of traditional gender roles.

Finally, after a century of oblivion, the character of l'Oiselle came out of oblivion again in 2022. The novel was published by Banquises et comètes, and a comic book re-creation, Lady-bird, was developed by writers Fabrice Sapolsky and Dawn J. Starr, and the artist Daniele Sapuppo.

== Character presentation ==
Her real name is Vega de Ortega, and she is also known as Lady Bird in the United States, where she performed her first extraordinary actions. With the help of her black suit equipped with artificial wings, she manages to easily chase down thugs who mistake her for a supernatural creature. This is how she comes to the rescue of a man, Daniel de San-Remo, whose life is threatened because of an inheritance issue.

Vega de Ortega was trained by a secret organization, the Companions of the Black Star. She was educated in a way that made her completely immune to fear, so she is the only one who can use her flying suit. The Companions of the Black Star are an anarchist society whose goal is to create a global utopia where all borders disappear. Based on a Mediterranean island, Stella Negra, the organization employs many scientists who create highly developed technology, such as the Oiselle suit. In addition, Vega benefits from twelve life tubes: substances manufactured by her friend, Aour-Ruoa, an Egyptian scientist capable of telepathy, which allow her to temporarily increase her senses, her endurance or to reinforce her metabolism. Finally, during her adventures, the Oiselle also uses night vision glasses.

== Cycle Compagnons de l'Étoile Noire ==
The novel L'Oiselle ou Royale énigme is part of a cycle developed by René d'Anjou. These series takes place in part in Alaxa, a fictional kingdom governed by Alexis III, at war with his neighbor Kouranie. In this universe, technology is advanced thanks to the work of the brilliant alchemist Fedor Romalewski in his laboratory "The Green Island" and to the revolutionary organization The Companions of the Black Star.

The Companions of the Black Star are in conflict with another secret society, the Friends of Happiness; and if the Oiselle has a deep sense of good and evil, the organization is much more pragmatic and does not hesitate to commit crimes to achieve its ends. Thus, its members resort to murder and child abduction if they feel the need.

Novels composing the cycle :

- Maître après Dieu (1901)
- Aigle et colombe (1902–1903)
- Rêve d'amour (1905)
- Le prince Fédor (1907)
- Les compagnons des ténèbres (1909)
- Le pardon d'outre-tombe (1909)
- L'Oiselle ou Royale énigme (1909)

== Posterity ==
A Wikisource workshop lead to the creation of the book Véga la magicienne on Wikisource in French in 2019.

== Bibliography ==
- Costes, Guy; Altairac, Joseph (2018). Rétrofictions : encyclopédie de la conjecture romanesque rationnelle francophone, de Rabelais à Barjavel, 1532-1951. Vol. 1 : letters A à L, 2: letters M to Z. Amiens / Paris: Interface, Encrage / Les Belles Lettres. ISBN 978-2-25144-851-0...
- Croquet, Par Pauline (2022-04-01). "Oubliée pendant un siècle, L'Oiselle, première superhéroïne française, reprend son envol". Le Monde.fr (in French).
- Fournier, Xavier (2014). Super-héros. Une histoire française (in French). Paris: Huginn & Muninn. ISBN 978-2364801271..
