= Cultural impact of Wonder Woman =

Impact of Wonder Woman in culture

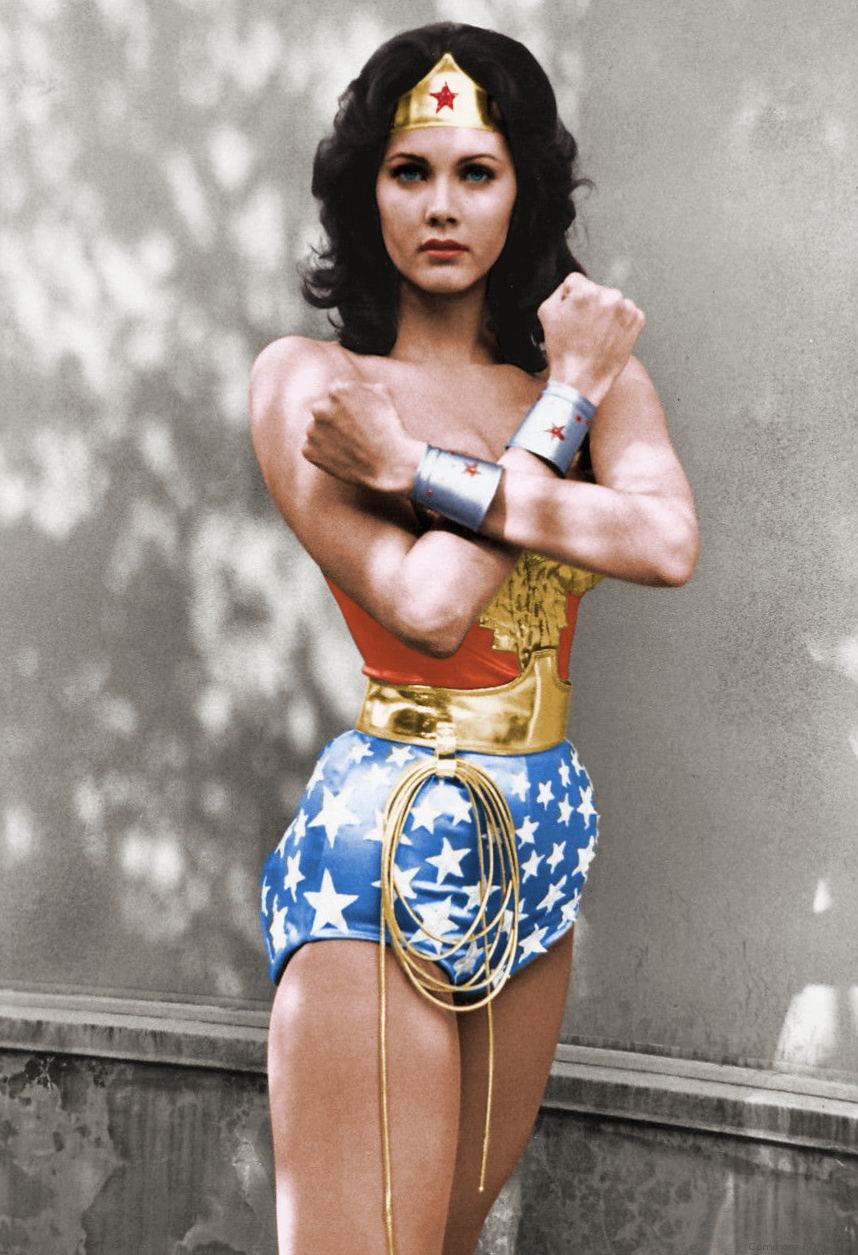
Photo of Lynda Carter as Wonder Woman from the television series of the same name

Wonder Woman is a character created for comic books in 1941, the medium in which she is still most prominently found to this day. As befitting an icon of her status, she has made appearances in other forms of media and has been referenced and meta-referenced beyond the scope of traditional superhero entertainment. For several years in the 1950s, the only three superheroes to have their own comic book were her, Superman, and Batman.

The cultural impact of the character, once derided by psychologists and anti-comic book crusaders as an anti-male lesbian, has steadily increased over the years, having served as an iconic exemplar of the feminist movement and a continuing symbol of female empowerment.

As such, she appears in numerous media, from cereal box covers and popular magazines to being referenced both directly and indirectly in film, animation and television programming. As a cultural icon, she is the subject of several homages and parodies in many forms of media.

== In media ==
Wonder Woman's viewpoints and characteristics reflect those of her creator, William Moulton Marston, who was a strong supporter of feminist ideals and female empowerment:

"(She) encourages women to stand up for themselves, to learn to fight, and be strong, so they don't have to be scared, or depend on men".

=== In art ===
Wonder Woman is the subject of a 1978 - 1979 video art piece by Dara Birnbaum, Technology/Transformation: Wonder Woman. In this work she uses appropriated images of Wonder Woman to subvert the ideology and meaning embedded in the television series. Author T.J. Demos writes, "(the) opening with a prolonged salvo of fiery explosions accompanied by the warning cry of a siren, Technology/Transformation: Wonder Woman is supercharged, action-packed, and visually riveting... throughout its nearly six minutes we see several scenes featuring the main character Diana Prince... in which she transforms into the famed superhero.". The exhibit currently resides in New York's Museum of Modern Art.

=== In theatre ===
Wonder Woman's origin, the invention of the lie detector and the unconventional troika marriage between Dr. Marston, Elizabeth Holloway Marston and Olive Byrne are interwoven in a 2014 production, Lasso of Truth. The last act engages two current-day characters discussing what Wonder Woman means to them individually, reflecting on her influence on society in general.

=== In nightclubs ===
In Christine Jorgensen's nightclub act, she sang several songs, including "I Enjoy Being a Girl", and at the end made a quick change into a Wonder Woman costume. She later recalled that Warner Communications, owners of the Wonder Woman character's copyright, demanded that she stop using the character; she did so and instead used a new character of her own invention, Superwoman, who was marked by the inclusion of a large letter S on her cape.

=== In pageants ===
At the 2001 Miss Gay Black America pageant, Tandi Iman Dupree and her dance partner Dee St. James performed a routine to the song "Holding Out for a Hero" by Bonnie Tyler; during the performance, Dupree was dressed as Wonder Woman, with St. James dressed as Superman. Dupree notably entered the performance by dropping from the ceiling, landing on the stage in a split. In 2009, this video was uploaded to YouTube, where it went viral.

=== In film ===
Images of and references to Wonder Woman abound in film. The apparent first appearance of the character was in the 1969 film Midnight Cowboy wherein a little girl covers her face with a copy of DC Comics' Wonder Woman #178. Later appearances have female (and male) characters of all ages appearing in Wonder Woman's costume or T-shirt representations of said costume. Wonder Woman entered the cultural lexicon, as characters were compared to Wonder Woman due to their athletic prowess, beauty and/or height.

Cobie Smulders performed the voice for Wonder Woman in 2014's The Lego Movie. Wonder Woman reappeared briefly as a non-speaking character in follow-up The Lego Batman Movie (2017).

The first live action theatrical film featuring Wonder Woman was 2016's Batman v Superman: Dawn of Justice. The second was 2017's Wonder Woman.

Professor Marston and the Wonder Women is a 2017 film about American psychologist William Moulton Marston, who created Wonder Woman. The film, directed and written by Angela Robinson, stars Luke Evans as Marston, Rebecca Hall as his legal wife Elizabeth and Bella Heathcote as Olive Byrne, their lover and the third member of their closed polyamorous triad. However, in an interview with Mark Walters, William Moulton Marston's granddaughter Christie Marston stated that the film is historically inaccurate. She said that the creators of the film did not contact her family and that the “depiction of the family and Wonder Woman’s origins are made up”. She also posted a statement on Twitter saying that "the film is not a true story. It is based on someone's imagination not in any way related to my family." In another interview with Rob Salkowitz for Forbes, Marston argues against two aspects of the film. The first lies in the depiction of Elizabeth and Olive: “The relationship between Gram [Elizabeth Marston] and Dots [Olive Byrne] is wrong; they were as sisters, not lovers.” The second part revolves around the depiction of the origin of Wonder Woman, which has “William Moulton Marston presenting an idea for a female hero, and Elizabeth naysaying the idea, declaring that nobody would ever publish it.” Christie Marston states instead that when her grandfather was asked by his publisher to create a comic character, he “went home and discussed it with my grandmother. She said to go ahead and do it, but that it had to be a woman.” Marston further elaborates on Elizabeth and Olive by stating that she spent a lot of time with her open-minded grandmother who never gave indication to her of a relationship with Olive. She also states that Elizabeth and Olive continued to share the responsibilities for bringing up the four children in the household after Marston's death because it was economically viable for both women. Christie Marston repeated and elaborated upon these statements in an op-ed for The Hollywood Reporter.

=== In literature and comics ===
In his book, Seduction of the Innocent, psychiatrist and anti-comic book crusader Fredric Wertham wrote that Wonder Woman had a bondage subtext to her character, a claim somewhat strengthened by the character's creator, William Moulton Marston having admitted as much. As well, Wertham also claimed Wonder Woman's strength and independence made her a lesbian, calling the "homosexual connotation of the Wonder Woman type of story is psychologically unmistakable", and considered Wonder Woman to be "Lesbian counterpart of Batman" Wertham notes in the Chapter "Those Wicked Men" in that Wonder Woman's sidekicks, students at the fictional, all-woman Holliday College are the 'Holliday girls,' i.e. the holiday girls, the gay party girls, the gay girls." The chapter title references a comic book story wherein another princess talks about "those wicked men". "For boys", writes Wertham, "Wonder Woman is a frightening image. For girls she is a morbid ideal. Where Batman is anti-feminine, the attractive Wonder Woman and her counterparts are definitely anti-masculine."

This sentiment would be later echoed by other critics. Short story author and cultural historian Jim Harmon describes in his 1970 book, All in Color For a Dime how Wonder Woman would "exchange hugs and kisses of delight with the readily available Holliday Girls." Harmon adds, "It was a very sick scene." This recollection by Harmon is disputed by comic book artist and writer, Trina Robbins. She notes that "although Wonder Woman is indeed seen hugging her friends and her mother in the pages of these comics (women do hug!), she doesn't kiss them. She's never even depicted kissing her "boyfriend," Steve Trevor!"

Robert Kanigher, who took over writing the comic in 1948 after the death of creator William Moulton Marston as well as later creating other female superheroines such as Black Canary, Lady Cop, Rose and Thorn and The Harlequin confided to Robbins in a telephone interview that the Amazons from her home, Paradise Island (where no men are permitted) were all lesbians.

=== In periodicals ===
Wonder Woman featured on the first cover of Ms. magazine, July, 1972

Gloria Steinem chose an image of Wonder Woman for the first cover of Ms. magazine in July, 1972, and again for the cover of the July–August 1997 issue. In the latter example, the retrospective issue depicts an illustrated version of the modernized version of Wonder Woman is reading a copy of the original Ms. magazine, its cover showing the Golden Age representation of the character. As well, magazine covers formed a collage of Wonder Woman on the cover of the 35th anniversary issue of Ms. magazine in 2007.

=== In television ===
Wonder Woman's iconic nature has found its way into such television programs as The Big Bang Theory, Charmed, Frasier, Friends, 30 Rock, The Simpsons, Family Guy, and Robot Chicken. In the pilot episode of Duncanville, she appears in Duncan's dream.

Prior to the more widely known Lynda Carter Wonder Woman series, Cathy Lee Crosby starred in a made-for-TV movie in 1974, playing the character as a blond in a star-spangled red & blue costume, which featured a skirt & tights rather than the comic costume. She uses her powers to thwart an international spy ring headed by Ricardo Montalbán.

Carter appeared on a 1976 Olivia Newton-John Special as Wonder Woman wherein she deflects a bullet meant for Olivia. In 1980, she appeared in an episode of The Muppet Show, singing The Rubberband Man and Orange Colored Sky. During a skit, Miss Piggy becomes "Wonder Pig" in order to rescue her family from a giant-sized chicken. Carter continues to be identified with the character thirty years after the portrayals.

The Wendy Williams Show host Wendy Williams often drinks from various Wonder Woman coffee mugs (having the same initials of 'WW'). In 2010, when DC Comics revamped the character with a new costume, Wendy had a 10-minute segment discussing the change and explained why she didn't care for it.

At Backlash, Nikki Bella dressed as Wonder Woman.

== In activism ==
Wonder Woman depicted as stricken by AIDS, in an awareness campaign

=== In women's culture and feminism ===
Feminist activist Gloria Steinem, who grew up reading Wonder Woman comics, was a key player in the restoration of Wonder Woman's powers and traditional costume, which were restored in issue #204 (January–February 1973). Steinem, offended that the most famous female superhero had been depowered, had placed Wonder Woman (in costume) on the cover of the first issue of the American feminist magazine Ms. (1972) – Warner Communications, DC Comics' owner, was an investor – which also contained an appreciative essay about the character.

Wonder Woman also appeared on the cover of the July–August 1997 issue of Ms. In the latter example, the retrospective issue depicts an illustrated version of the modernized version of Wonder Woman reading a copy of the original Ms. magazine, its cover showing the Golden Age representation of the character. As well, magazine covers formed a collage of Wonder Woman on the cover of the 35th anniversary issue of Ms. magazine in 2007.

Steinem once wrote:

"Wonder Woman's family of Amazons on Paradise Island, her band of college girls in America, and her efforts to save individual women are all welcome examples of women working together and caring about each other's welfare. The idea of such cooperation may not seem particularly revolutionary to the male reader. Men are routinely depicted as working well together, but women know how rare and therefore exhilarating the idea of sisterhood really is. Wonder Woman's mother, Queen Hippolyte, offers yet another welcome example to young girls in search of a strong identity. Queen Hippolyte founds nations, wages war to protect Paradise Island, and sends her daughter off to fight the forces of evil in the world... Wonder Woman symbolizes many of the values of the women's culture that feminists are now trying to introduce into the mainstream: strength and self-reliance for women; sisterhood and mutual support among women; peacefulness and esteem for human life; a diminishment both of "masculine" aggression and of the belief that violence is the only way of solving conflicts."

On October 21, 2016, the United Nations named Wonder Woman a UN Honorary Ambassador for the Empowerment of Women and Girls in a ceremony attended by UN Secretary-General Ban Ki-moon, Lynda Carter, and Gal Gadot.

On October 26, 2017, Hillary Clinton was given the first Women's Media Center Wonder Woman Award.

=== In health awareness campaigns ===
Wonder Woman's image—along with that of Superman—was used in an AIDS awareness campaign by French organization AIDES. Posters depicting Wonder Woman wasting away in a hospital bed and attached to an intravenous drip were exhibited on billboards and in French subways, demonstrating that no-one is beyond the reach of the disease. Concerned that the images could have an adverse impact on the public perception of the two superheroes, DC Comics demanded that AIDES withdraw the campaign.

== In academics ==
=== Scholarship ===
- Sociologist Susan Hopkins in her text Girl Heroes, juxtaposes the image of Lynda Carter as Wonder Woman with Girl Power action heroines of the late 1990s.
- Academic Angelo Iannella (Course Coordinator and Lecturer) began a research paper entitled "From Wonder Woman to Xena: Reframing Greek Mythology", which reveals the development and significance of the superheroine in speculative fiction. The article was first published in The Advertiser in South Australia on December 7, 2001. The research paper attracted interviews on radio as well as interstate conferences at universities in Australia. This event was timed with Wonder Woman's 60th Anniversary who first appeared in 1941.
