= Steve Green (journalist) =

British writer (born 1960)

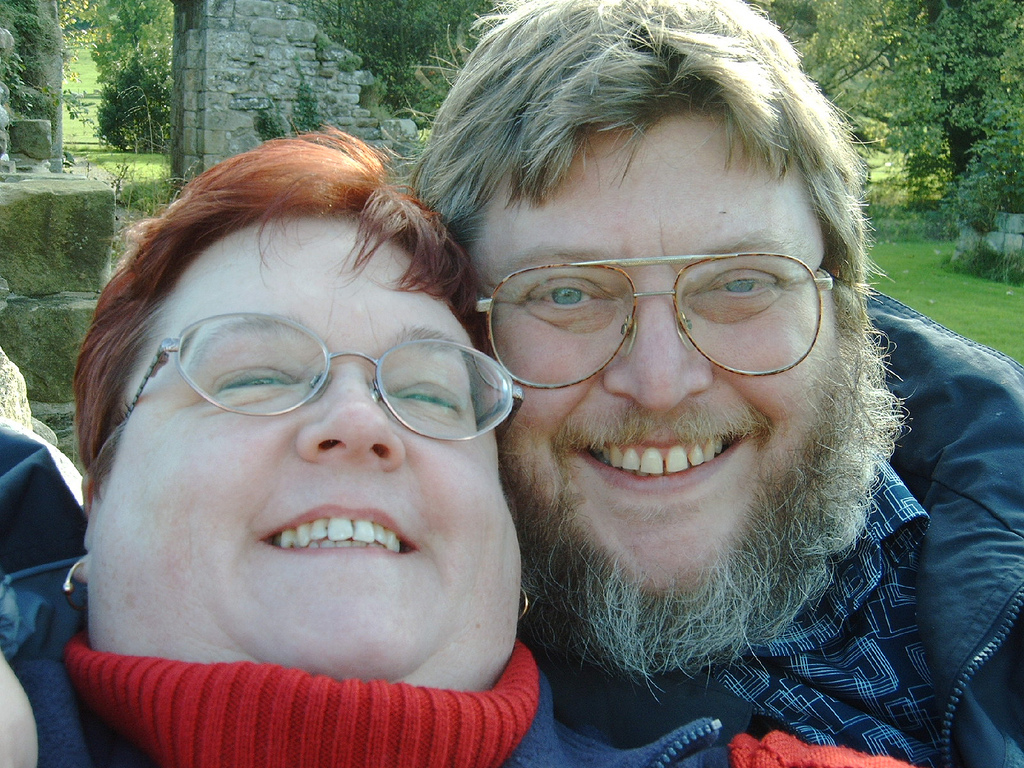
Ann and Steve Green at Jervaulx Abbey, North Yorkshire, October 2005. Photo by Steve Green.

Steve Green (born 1960, Solihull, England) is a former newspaper reporter (1978–84) turned freelance journalist, who has also written short fiction and poetry. He is an active member of the science fiction press and fan community.

== Journalism and other writings ==
Subsequent to his career as a newspaper reporter (initially on The Walsall Observer, later on The Solihull News), Green has contributed to such magazines as The Dark Side (for which he interviewed the actress Jenny Hanley and director André Øvredal, as well as writing 51 instalments of the review column "Fanzine Focus"), Interzone (interviewing the comics writer and editor Stan Lee and the author/screenwriter Peter Atkins), Fantasia and SFX, as well as being an occasional contributor to the 1990s BBC Radio 5 series The Way Out. He wrote an online column on real ale and the British pub industry for The Solihull Times (moving to The Sunday Mercury) in the late 2000s and returned to The Dark Side as a movie reviewer in 2015. Since 2023, he has been a regular contributor to the magazine Yours Retro.

With Martin Tudor, he was also the co-editor/publisher of the science fiction journal Critical Wave, from its launch in October 1987 to its financial heat-death in mid-1996; a new, online edition was announced in September 2008, with the same editorial team; the first issue of this new series was released in November 2008, but a second failed to appear.

During the mid-1990s, Green was a regular columnist for both the Seattle freesheet Mansplat! and the focal point American fanzine Apparatchik (examples:). His Apparatchik column, "Fannish Memory Syndrome", was relaunched in the Hugo Award-nominated US fanzine The Drink Tank in September 2007. Selected examples of this writing can be found on his professional blog The Shadow Library.

In the autumn of 2019, Green co-founded Birmingham Now TV with Des Tong, Gary James and Chrissie Harper. The first episode of the monthly magazine show 'Birmingham Now' was posted online on 25 November 2019, but the project was a victim of the UK's Covid Lockdown (most of the April 2020 episode was completed, but never screened).

== Related activities ==
Green joined the Birmingham Science Fiction Group in February 1977 and has held several posts with that organisation, including editor of its monthly newsletter. He also became a member of the British Science Fiction Association, eventually taking over the clubs column ("Life on Mars") for its newsletter Matrix. Later, he collaborated with artist Kevin Clarke on a short-lived comic strip for Matrix, "The Tavern at the End of Time".

He was chair of the British science fiction conventions Novacon 14 (1984), Novacon 37 (2007), and Novacon 44 (2014); he also ran the "Fan Lounge" at Intervention, the 1997 Eastercon. Other roles include: Fantasy Amateur Press Association vice-president, 2005–07, and president-elect in 2009 (as the post was dissolved in the same ballot, Green never took office, but was briefly listed in official publications as "president emeritus"); administrator of the Nova Awards for British fanzines, presented annually at Novacon, 2002–09 (he reassumed the role in late 2010); former administrator of the Delta Film Award, presented annually at Manchester's Festival of Fantastic Films until 2014.

In November 2008, Green announced himself as a candidate for the TransAtlantic Fan Fund. He won and subsequently attended the 2009 world sf convention, Anticipation, before travelling across Canada and the United States. He wrote several articles about his trip and acted as European TAFF administrator for two years, a requirement of the post.

He was a regular guest speaker at the Exeter University convention Microcon, 2008–10, 2012–13 and 2015 (the final year it was held).

Green was a director of the UK publishing imprint Rose of Eibon.

In addition to having several of his own short stories published, including "Cracking" in The Anthology of Fantasy & the Supernatural, plus a large number of poems, Green appears as a supporting character in both David Langford's comic novel The Leaky Establishment and Joel Lane's novella The Witnesses Are Gone (the latter also features his late wife, Ann Green). Joel Lane's 2009 short story collection The Terrible Changes is dedicated to Green and to the memory of his late wife, Ann.

== Personal life ==
Green married fellow science fiction fan Ann Thomas (born 1961, Merthyr Tydfil, Wales) in December 1983. She died in July 2008, aged 46, following a brief diabetes-related illness.
