= Rog Peyton =

Roger "Rog" Peyton (born 1942) is an English science fiction fan, bookseller, editor and publisher from Birmingham.

Peyton has been an active member of science fiction fandom since 1961, when he co-founded the Birmingham Science Fiction Group. From 1964 to 1966, he served as editor for the British Science Fiction Association's critical magazine Vector. He also started the British Science Fiction Association's fiction magazine Tangent. He began a long tradition of working on science fiction convention organizing committees with work for Brumcon 2, the 1965 Eastercon. Since then he has attended over 150 science fiction conventions including being one of only six (The Magnificent Six) who have attended all 45 Novacons and in 1979 won the Doc Weir Award for his services to fandom.

In 1971 Peyton and business partner Rod Milner launched a part-time bookselling business, Andromeda Book Company, in Old Hill, a few miles outside of Birmingham. Moving into the city centre in 1973, Peyton gave up his job in the building industry to sell books full-time, which was to last until 2002 when the business went into voluntary liquidation. Following the demise of Andromeda, Peyton went solo selling on the internet as Replay Books. During the Andromeda years, their ventures included co-editing the Venture SF series of reprints of classic adventure science fiction from Arrow Books (1985–1989). Peyton and Milner also ran the small press Drunken Dragon Press, which among other titles published the 1988 collection of parodies The Dragonhiker's Guide to Battlefield Covenant at Dune's Edge: Odyssey Two by David Langford.
