= Kevin Smith (editor) =

Kevin Smith was an active British science fiction fan from the mid-1970s to the mid-1980s, producing such science fiction fanzines as Drilkjis (with Dave Langford) and Dot, writing for fanzines (Nabu, Space Junk, and others), chairing British science fiction conventions, editing a 1979 anthology of British fanwriting titled Mood 70 for Seacon '79, the 37th World Science Fiction Convention, and serving from 1980 to 1982 as editor of Vector, the critical journal of the British Science Fiction Association. He won the TransAtlantic Fan Fund in 1982.
