= Greg Pickersgill =

British science fiction fan (born 1951)

Greg Pickersgill (born 1951) is a British science fiction fan.

Pickersgill's love of science fiction led him into UK fandom where he has been involved in both fan-writing and convention-running. He joined the BSFA in 1967, and began writing reviews for the Association's magazine, Vector, in 1968. His fanzines include Fouler, Ritblat, Stop Breaking Down, and Rastus Johnson's Cakewalk. Convention activities include developing British fanrooms in the 1970s, fanrooms at the 1987 and 1995 Worldcons and the 2000 Eastercon, and a key role in the British Mexicons of the 1980s. He created the Memory Hole (a combined permanent fanzine collection and redistribution system), the former Memory Hole internet forum (for discussing reading, collecting and archiving science fiction fanzines) and helped set up The Mexicon Hat (a charitable fund to assist projects related to British fandom; beneficiaries included the journal Critical Wave).

A collection of Pickersgill's writing for fanzines, Can't Get Off the Island, was published to coincide with his fan guest-of-honour appearance at the 2005 World Science Fiction Convention, Interaction.

Between 2012 and 2013 Pickersgill co-edited, with David Langford, a set of three volumes of Algis Budrys's review columns from The Magazine of Fantasy and Science Fiction covering the period 1975-1993.

== Books edited ==
All of the following were co-edited with David Langford:

- Benchmarks Continued: The F&SF "Books" Columns Volume 1: 1975-1982 (2012)
- Benchmarks Revisited: The F&SF "Books" Columns Volume 2: 1983-1986 (2013)
- Benchmarks Concluded: The F&SF "Books" Columns Volume 3: 1987-1993 (2013)

== Awards and honours ==
- Doc Weir Award (1978)
- TransAtlantic Fan Fund winner (1986)
- Fan GoH: Follycon (Eastercon, 1988)
- Nova Award for Fanzine and Fanwriter (1994)
- GoH: Interaction (Worldcon 2005)
