= Science Fiction Monthly =

British science fiction magazine

- Two of the binders NEL sold to hold the magazine, open to show the first issue. The artwork is by Bruce Pennington.
- Categories: Science fiction
- Frequency: Monthly
- Publisher: New English Library
- First issue: February 1974
- Final issue: May 1976
- Country: United Kingdom
- Language: English

Science Fiction Monthly was a British science fiction magazine published from 1974 to 1976 by New English Library. Launched in response to demand from readers for posters of the cover art of New English Library's science fiction paperbacks, it was initially very successful—its circulation had reached 150,000 by the third issue. It reprinted artwork by Chris Foss, Jim Burns, Bruce Pennington, Roger Dean, and many others. Well-known writers who appeared in its pages included Brian Aldiss, Bob Shaw, Christopher Priest, and Harlan Ellison. High production costs meant that a large circulation was necessary to sustain profitability, and when circulation fell to about 20,000 after two years NEL ceased publication. A new magazine, S.F. Digest, was launched in its stead but lasted only one issue.

== Publication history ==
In the early 1970s, the London-based publisher New English Library (NEL) published a successful line of science fiction paperbacks that included well-known authors such as Frank Herbert and Robert A. Heinlein. The covers were popular with readers, and NEL frequently received requests for copies of the paperback cover art, without the overprinted material such as the title. They decided to produce a magazine to make the artwork available in poster form, hoping that the magazine would attract a young audience who might then become readers of NEL's books. By the middle of 1973 the decision was taken to add fiction and non-fiction features, though NEL still considered it primarily a vehicle for their art. The title was at first planned to be Sci-Fi Monthly, but this was abandoned when NEL found out that the abbreviation "sci-fi" was widely disliked by science fiction readers. The first issue appeared at the end of January 1974; the issues were always numbered and never dated. The editorial team included Michael Osborn as art editor, with responsibility for the magazine's layout, and, initially, Aune Butt and Penny Grant, who acquired non-fiction and fiction. From the eighth issue, Julie Davis took over Butt and Grant's editorial duties.

Interest in science fiction and fantastic art was growing at the time Science Fiction Monthly was launched, and sales were initially strong, with circulation reportedly at 150,000 by the third issue. This could not be sustained: Mike Ashley, a science fiction historian, suggests that poor economic conditions in the UK in the 1970s contributed to falling readership. Inflation, along with an increase in the cost of paper, meant that the price rose rapidly from 30p in late 1974 to 50p only eighteen months later, by which time circulation had fallen to under 20,000. Ashley also suggests that the readership was in "two factions: those who wanted the art did not want the fiction, and vice versa". The magazine was expensive to produce, because of the costs associated with colour reproduction, so it required a higher circulation than a typical digest magazine, and it was cancelled in early 1976. NEL replaced it with S.F. Digest, a smaller magazine with less emphasis on artwork, but this only lasted one issue before NEL's magazine department was cut.

== Contents and reception ==
Cover of the second issue; artwork by Chris Foss

The magazine was published in tabloid format (40 by 28 centimetres (16 by 11 in)), with high-quality colour reproduction; it was not stapled, so that it could be disassembled and the artwork used as posters. The first issue included four full-page reproductions, and another five double-page spreads, at 40 by 56 centimetres (16 by 22 in). One such double-page image was Bruce Pennington's depiction of the spaceship Discovery from Arthur C. Clarke's The Lost Worlds of 2001, which was also used as the cover art for the issue. As well as the art, the first issue included stories by Christopher Priest and Brian Aldiss, an excerpt from Pirates of the Asteroids by Isaac Asimov, and columns covering films, art, and news items. The first news column, by Penny Grant, mentioned the UK's annual Easter science fiction convention and the British Science Fiction Association (BSFA). Both saw a surge in inquiries about membership as a result, and over 400 people attended the next Easter convention—a significant increase over the previous year's attendance of 250–300.

Artists featured in subsequent issues included Tim White, David Hardy, Roger Dean, Jim Burns and Josh Kirby; the artwork depicted was not limited to works originally published by NEL. Chris Foss contributed the cover for the second issue; the science fiction historian David Kyle describes it as "a cross between the technologically reasoned, deep-space vehicle of 2001 and the inspired gimcrackery of artist Richard Powers", adding that it illustrated a trend in the 1970s towards "heavily pseudo-technological" artwork for science fiction paperback covers. The tabloid format was larger than the paperback book covers where much of the artwork had first appeared, and David Hardy commented that as a result "every brush-stroke and blemish became visible".

There were no other science fiction magazines in the UK in the mid-1970s, so the volume of fiction submissions was very high—about 400–500 stories a month. Terry Greenhough and Chris Morgan both made their first fiction sales to Science Fiction Monthly, and Garry Kilworth and David S. Garnett also had early sales, but it was a difficult market to break into: as well as the intense competition, the magazine only published two or three stories per issue, and usually at least one would be by a well-known writer. None of the winners of a short-story competition, run in 1974 with categories such as best foreign story and best Commonwealth story, went on to do any substantial work in the genre. Well-known British writers who appeared in the magazine's pages included Brian Aldiss, Christopher Priest, Ian Watson, Robert Holdstock, and Bob Shaw. Stories by American writers included both reprints and some original material, such as Harlan Ellison's "Shatterday" and Jack Williamson's "The Highest Dive". Despite the competitiveness of the market, the Encyclopedia of SF describes the fiction as having been initially weak, though improving once Davis became editor.

The non-fiction features included a series of articles by Mike Ashley on the history of science fiction magazines, later expanded into an anthology series. A series of interviews with authors appeared, each accompanied by one of their stories, including profiles of Samuel Delany, Harlan Ellison, J. G. Ballard, and Harry Harrison. Walter Gillings provided articles about established figures in the field such as Arthur C. Clarke, John Wyndham, A.E. van Vogt, and Olaf Stapledon, and under the pseudonym "Thomas Sheridan" ran a column called "The Query Box" in which he answered questions about science fiction.

== Bibliographic details ==
Issues of Science Fiction Monthly showing volume/issue number
Year	Jan	Feb	Mar	Apr	May	Jun	Jul	Aug	Sep	Oct	Nov	Dec
1974		1/1	1/2	1/3	1/4	1/5	1/6	1/7	1/8	1/9	1/10	1/11
1975	1/12	2/1	2/2	2/3	2/4	2/5	2/6	2/7	2/8	2/9	2/10	2/11
1976	2/12	3/1	3/2	3/3	3/4							
Issues of Science Fiction Monthly, showing volume and issue numbers. The colours indicate who was responsible for acquiring fiction and non-fiction: blue for Aune Butt and Penny Grant, yellow for Julie Davis.

The publisher was New English Library, based in London. The magazine never carried cover dates: the first issue appeared on 30 January 1974, and is usually indexed as either January or February as a result. The monthly schedule was completely regular. There were two volumes of twelve issues and a final volume of four issues. Each issue was tabloid-sized and had 28 pages; the price began at 25p, and went up to 30p with the October 1974 issue; to 35p in April 1975; to 40p in January 1976, and to 50p for the last two issues. Patricia Hornsey was editorial director. Fiction and non-fiction acquisitions were initially the responsibility of Aune Butt and Penny Grant; Julie Davis took over with the eighth issue. The team responsible for the look of the magazine was art editor Michael Osborn, art director Cecil Smith, and designer Jeremy Dixon. New English Library also sold binders for the magazine; these were dark purple and could hold 12 issues.

An anthology of stories from the first year of the magazine, The Best of Science Fiction Monthly, appeared in 1975, edited by Janet Sacks and published by NEL.

== Sources ==
- Ashley, Mike (1985). "Science Fiction Monthly (1974–1976)". In Tymn, Marshall B.; Ashley, Mike (eds.). Science Fiction, Fantasy and Weird Fiction Magazines. Westport, Connecticut: Greenwood Press. pp. 539–540. ISBN 978-0313212215. OCLC 10799935.
- Ashley, Mike (2007). Gateways to Forever: The Story of the Science-Fiction Magazines from 1970 to 1980. Liverpool: Liverpool University Press. ISBN 978-1846310034.
- Hansen, Rob (2016). Then: Science Fiction Fandom in the UK: 1930–1980. Reading, UK: Ansible Editions. ISBN 978-1326753269.
- Hardy, David (1978). "Art & Artists". In Holdstock, Robert (ed.). Encyclopedia of Science Fiction. London: Octopus Books. pp. 123–141. ISBN 978-0706407563. OCLC 1120420014.
- Kyle, David (1977). A Pictorial History of Science Fiction. London: Hamlyn. ISBN 978-0600381938. OCLC 2837412.
- Robinson, Roger (1987). Who's Hugh? An SF Reader's Guide to Pseudonyms. Liverpool: Beccon Publications. ISBN 978-1870824026. OCLC 21039531.
