= Birmingham Science Fiction Group =

The Birmingham Science Fiction Group (BSFG), also known as the "Brum Group", held its first meeting on 25 June 1971. It runs regular meetings in Birmingham, England, where SF fans can meet one another and professionals in the field in a friendly environment, and has organised the annual SF convention Novacon since 1972.

== History ==
There were at least two previous versions of the Birmingham Science Fiction Group prior to the launch of the current incarnation in 1971 (many of those involved had been members of the 1960s fan scene, described in Peter Weston's hardback memoir With Stars in My Eyes).

Initially, it shared Britain's second city with the Aston Science Fiction Group, which hosted the first Novacon that same year; by 1972, the Brum Group had become the dominant SF gathering in the region and took over Novacon from that year onwards. In contrast to many of its contemporaries, the BSFG had a formal constitution (copied in part from a local branch of the Young Conservatives) and held formal meetings each month, usually with a guest speaker. As well as issuing a monthly newsletter, the Brum Group also published one edition of its own fanzine in 1977, Meta, co-edited by Noel Chidwick, Steve Green and Paul R Harris.

In January 1983, Peter Weston won the election for BSFG chair on a platform of re-engaging the Group with wider British fandom; parties were hosted at conventions and an amateur press association set up (APA-B, later known as The Organisation). The last of those projects detached within 18 months, but the BSFG still runs Novacon and has organised three one-off mini-conventions (the 10th Anniversary Con in 1981, Fifteencon in 1986 and Twentycon in 1991; the last was viewed as a financial disaster and the thirtieth anniversary was marked with a small post-meeting party). In the early 1980s, the BSFG was also involved with a media event, Filmcon, but eventually withdrew its support due to concerns over the organisation; Filmcon was cancelled.

== Notable members and officers ==
- Honorary presidents Brian Aldiss, the late Harry Harrison & the late Bob Shaw
- Steve Green
- David A. Hardy
- Co-founder Rog Peyton
- Martin Tudor
- Co-founder Peter Weston
