= Picocon =

Science fiction convention held in Imperial College, London

Picocon is the name given to a series of British science fiction conventions run by the Imperial College Science Fiction and Fantasy Society (ICSF). Taking place on a Saturday (occasionally extended to Sunday), in February or early March in Imperial College's Blackett Building since 1984.

T-shirts and other merchandise related to the convention are typically emblazoned with the Greek letters ΨΦ (psi, phi), which can be read as Sci-Fi. Roles in organising the convention include the Sofa ("like a chair, only comfier") and the Beanbag.

The reason for the event numbering (Picocon, Picocon Pi, Picocon 4, ⋯) of the first conventions is unclear. One suggestion is that there was a predecessor Picocon event watching videos and playing board games, and that the first formal event with a guest speaker is therefore Picocon 2.

== List of Picocons ==
Year	Date(s)	Name	Location	Guest(s) of Honour
1984	2 February	Picocon	Imperial College	David Langford
1985	9 March	Picocon Pi	Imperial College	Dave Langford, Gerry Webb
1986	15 February	Picocon 4	Imperial College	Dave Langford, Brian Stableford
1987	21 February	Picocon 5	Imperial College	John Brunner, David Hardy
1988	6 February	Picocon 6	Imperial College	Terry Pratchett, Michael Scott Rohan, Dave Langford
1989	4 February	Picocon 7	Imperial College	Dave Langford, Terry Pratchett, Gerry Webb, Dave Lally
1990	3 March	Picocon 8	Imperial College	Bob Shaw
1991	2 March	Picocon 9	Imperial College	Dan Abnett, Alex Stewart
1992	7 March	Picocon 10	Imperial College	Dave Langford, Brian Stableford
1993	6 March	Picocon 11	Imperial College	Colin Greenland
1994	No Picocon was held in 1994.			
1995	12 March	Picocon 12	Imperial College	Iain M. Banks, Dr. Arley Anderson (Note: Dr Arley Anderson is a physics researcher who gave a talk about space travel through wormholes https://www.union.ic.ac.uk/scc/icsf/history/picocon/picocon12.html)
1996	4 February	Picocon 13	Imperial College	Robert Holdstock, Stephen Baxter, Christopher Priest
1997	2 March	Picocon 14	Imperial College	Simon Ings, Nicholas Royle
1998	28 February	Picocon 15	Imperial College	
1999	6 February	Picocon 16	Imperial College	Stephen Lawhead, Jane Johnson, M John Harrison (who jointly write under the pseudonym Gabriel King)
2000	19 February	Picocon 17	Imperial College	Juliet McKenna, Brian Stableford, Garry Kilworth, Ian Watson
2001	10 February	Picocon 18	Imperial College	Christopher Priest, Geoff Ryman, Juliet E. McKenna, Jane Killick (Note: Jane Killick is a radio broadcaster, SF novelist and author of behind the scenes books for popular SF tv series such as Babylon 5 and Red Dwarf)
2002	9 February	Picocon 19	Imperial College	Anne Gay, (Note: Anne Gay is an author of SF novels, see the SF Encyclopedia for a bibliography https://sf-encyclopedia.com/entry/gay_anne) China Miéville, Stan Nicholls, Geoff Ryman
2003	22 February	Picocon 20	Imperial College	Jack Cohen, Gwyneth Jones
2004	7 February	Picocon 21	Imperial College	Peter F. Hamilton, Paul McAuley, Adam Roberts
2005	19 February	Picocon 22	Imperial College	Gwyneth Jones, Jon Courtenay Grimwood, Brian Stableford
2006	18 February	Picocon 23	Imperial College	Ian Watson, Natasha Mostert, Mark Roberts
2007	17 February	Picocon 24	Imperial College	Charlie Stross, Ken MacLeod, Farah Mendlesohn
2008	23 February	Picocon 25	Imperial College	Paul Cornell, Cory Doctorow, Liz Williams
2009	28 February	Picocon 26	Imperial College	Pat Cadigan, Robert Rankin, Michael Marshall Smith
2010	27 February	Picocon 27 3^3	Imperial College	Alastair Reynolds, Amanda Hemingway, Jaine Fenn
2011	19 February	Picocon 28	Imperial College	Juliet McKenna, Kari Sperring, Paul McAuley
2012	18 February	Picocon 29	Imperial College	Adrian Czajkowski, Justina Robson, Tricia Sullivan
2013	16-17 February	Picocon 30	Imperial College	Peter F. Hamilton, Kate Griffin, Steph Swainston, Richard K. Morgan
2014	22 February	Picocon 31 Survival	Imperial College	Sarah Pinborough, Charles Stross, David Southwood
2015	14-15 February	Picocon 32 Duality	Imperial College	Cory Doctorow, Frances Hardinge, Ian McDonald, Kari Sperring, Stuart Ashen
2016	20 February	Picocon 33	Imperial College	Paul Cornell, Michelle Paver, Carrie Hope Fletcher
2017	18 February	Picocon 34 Futurism: Oh, the humanity	Imperial College	Jaine Fenn, Paul McAuley, Al Robertson, Justina Robson, Stuart Ashen
2018	17 February	Picocon 35 Harmony	Imperial College	Paul Stewart, Chris Riddell, Ben Aaronovitch, Emma Newman
2019	16 February	Picocon 36	Imperial College	Alexis Kennedy, Lottie Bevan, Simon Morden, Andrew Bannister, Gavin Smith
2020	22 February	Picocon 37 Pride	Imperial College	Juliet Kemp, Roz Kaveney, Tamsyn Muir
2021	20 February	Picocon 38 <automata>	(online)	Jeff Somers, Dan Moren, S.J. Kincaid, Brian David Johnson
2022	5 March	Picocon 39 Apocalypse	Imperial College, online	Bryony Pearce, Louise Mumford, A.J. Flowers, Brendan DuBois, Gareth L. Powell, Matthew Wraith
2023	11 March	Picocon 40 Twisted	Imperial College, online	Alma Alexander, Gav Thorpe, Mark Lawrence, Jonathan Sims, Tim Klotz, (Note: Tim Klotz is an actor & fight director for film, theatre, games etc. IMDb has a filmography https://www.imdb.com/name/nm1238088/) Allan Henry (Note: Allan Henry is an actor, fight director, stunt performer and the motion capture artist for the title character in the 2023 movie Cocaine Bear)
2024	23 March	Picocon 41 Menagerie	Imperial College, online	Christopher Paolini, Jonathan Sims, Gita Ralleigh (Note: Gita Ralleigh is a poet, writer, and doctor who teaches creative writing to science undergraduates at Imperial)
2025	1 March	Picocon 42 Sentience	Imperial College	qntm, Kevin Jon Davies, James Flanagan (Note: James Flanagan is an author of speculative fiction and a Professor of Cancer Informatics at the Imperial College Department of Surgery & Cancer)
2026	7 March	Picocon 43 Wyrmhole	Imperial College	Drew Wagar (Note: Drew Wagar is an SF author whose works include contributions to the Elite Universe, and the Shadeward saga. His works can be found at https://www.drewwagar.com/.), Paul J. McAuley

== GoH Notes ==
One line introductions for a Guests of Honour who don't (yet) have a Wikipedia biography page, e.g. linking a creator to a bibliography, filmography or an example book (series), podcast, piece/series of art, etc.
