= Infinite Detail =

2019 novel by Tim Maughan

- Author: Tim Maughan
- Language: English
- Genre: Science fiction
- Publication date: 5 March 2019
- Publication place: United Kingdom

Infinite Detail is a 2019 science fiction novel by British author Tim Maughan.

== Summary ==
=== Setting ===
The novel is set in a near-future Bristol.

== Themes ==
Valentina Palladino of Ars Technica wrote that the novel "shows how the “infinite detail” lifestyle, one full of noise and data constantly thrown at you from all sides, can be used to empower some and enslave others. He also explores how easily both corporations and smart individuals can weaponize technology to use it against the masses as well as further self-serving agendas." Nathan Jefferson of the Los Angeles Review of Books wrote that the novel explored "both the unwitting consequences of our contemporary regimes of datafication and surveillance and the conditions of possibility for life, art, and culture in their wake," saying that, "for Maughan, culture is resolutely material, bound up in the media of everyday life. What, then, happens to cultural production when the dominant medium of our moment, the cloud, evaporates?"

Electra Pritchett of Strange Horizons noted that the novel explored the global supply chain as well as "how the algorithms of the Internet, from social media to the stock market, already control far more of our lives than we realize." Paul Graham Raven of the British Science Fiction Association has stated that one of the central themes of the novel is "the mediation of social relations by global infrastructural networks of inscrutable complexity. It’s not just about who (or rather what) you trust to recommend things, but who you trust to keep you safe, to keep the lights on and the shops stocked... It's about the failure of utopias, but it’s also about why utopias fail: about the cruel efficiency of networks, and the role of power and significance therein, but also about the cruelty of removing them suddenly without an adequate plan for their replacement." Ian Mond of Locus Magazine noted the novel's "critique on the nature of revolution," saying that Maughan "appreciates that the internet, the cloud, those pesky algorithms are firmly embedded in our capitalist reality and that disentangling ourselves, without completely destroying civilisation as we know it, will be a difficult task."

== Reception ==
Kirkus Reviews described the novel as "thoughtful" and "an original and engaging work of kitchen-sink dystopia." Paul Graham Raven of the British Science Fiction Association described the novel as "a tapestry of near-term prognostication that stuns you with its contextual implications, while its streetwise prose gets to work on picking your emotional pockets." Ian Mond of Locus Magazine described the novel as "politically astute, fascinating, and depressing," saying it was "timely and powerful."

Valentina Palladino of Ars Technica said that the novel was "one of those rare novels that, if you enjoyed it the first time, you’ll want to re-read it to catch details that you missed the first time around," but that it had "polarizing parts," notably that "the plot is pretty loose. The novel feels more like a bunch of character studies about individuals experiencing the same dystopian reality, with thin threads tying them together."
