= Bagdad (novel) =

1986 novel by Ian Dennis

Bagdad is a novel by Ian Dennis published in 1986.

== Plot summary ==
Bagdad is a novel in which the setting is an Arabian land.

== Reception ==
Dave Langford reviewed Bagdad for White Dwarf #82, and stated that "an outrageously mannered performance, full of exotic dottiness. The hierarchs of Bagdad seem well grounded in existential Angst and, when not fleeing the improbably bloodbaths of the revolutionary Ripe Fruit party, tell each other twisted little tales-within-tales like "The Jinni and the Civil Servant"."

Wendy Graham reviewed Bagdad for Adventurer magazine and stated that "A rich and fruity work that may not be to everyone's taste, but which l enjoyed a great deal."

== Reviews ==
- Review by Charles de Lint (1986) in Science Fiction Review, Winter 1986
- Review by Mark Greener (1986) in Vector 135
- Review by Andy Sawyer (1988) in Paperback Inferno, #70
