= Science fiction fandom =

Subculture of fans who enjoy science fiction

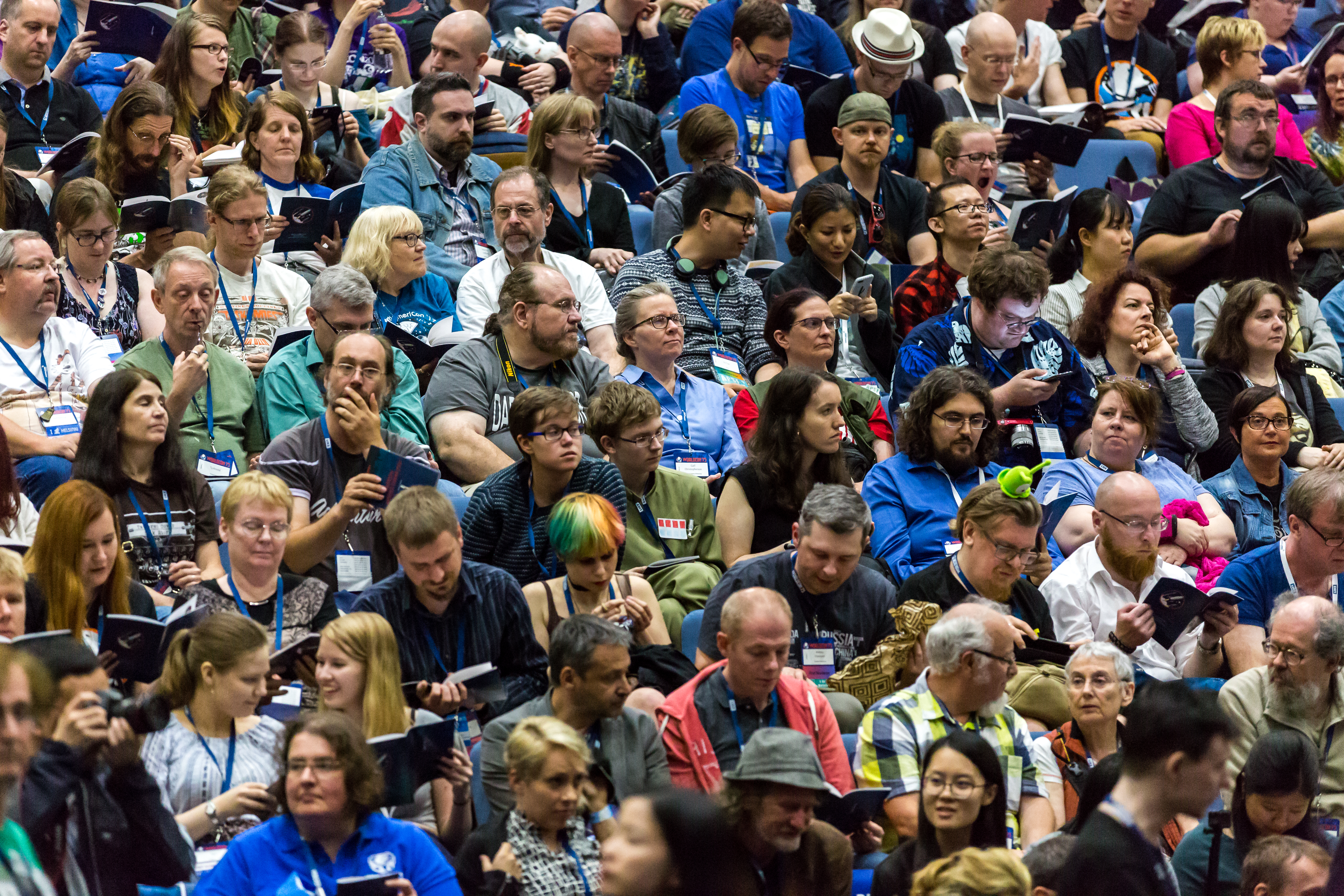
Audience waiting for the Hugo Award ceremony at the 75th World Science Fiction Convention in Helsinki, Finland in 2017

Science fiction fandom or SF fandom is a community or fandom of people interested in science fiction in contact with one another based upon that interest. SF fandom has a life of its own, but not much in the way of formal organization (although formal clubs such as the Futurians (1937–1945) and the Los Angeles Science Fantasy Society (1934–present) are recognized examples of organized fandom).

Most often called simply "fandom" within the community, it can be viewed as a distinct subculture, with its own literature and jargon; marriages and other relationships among fans are common, as are multi-generational fan families.

== Origins and history ==
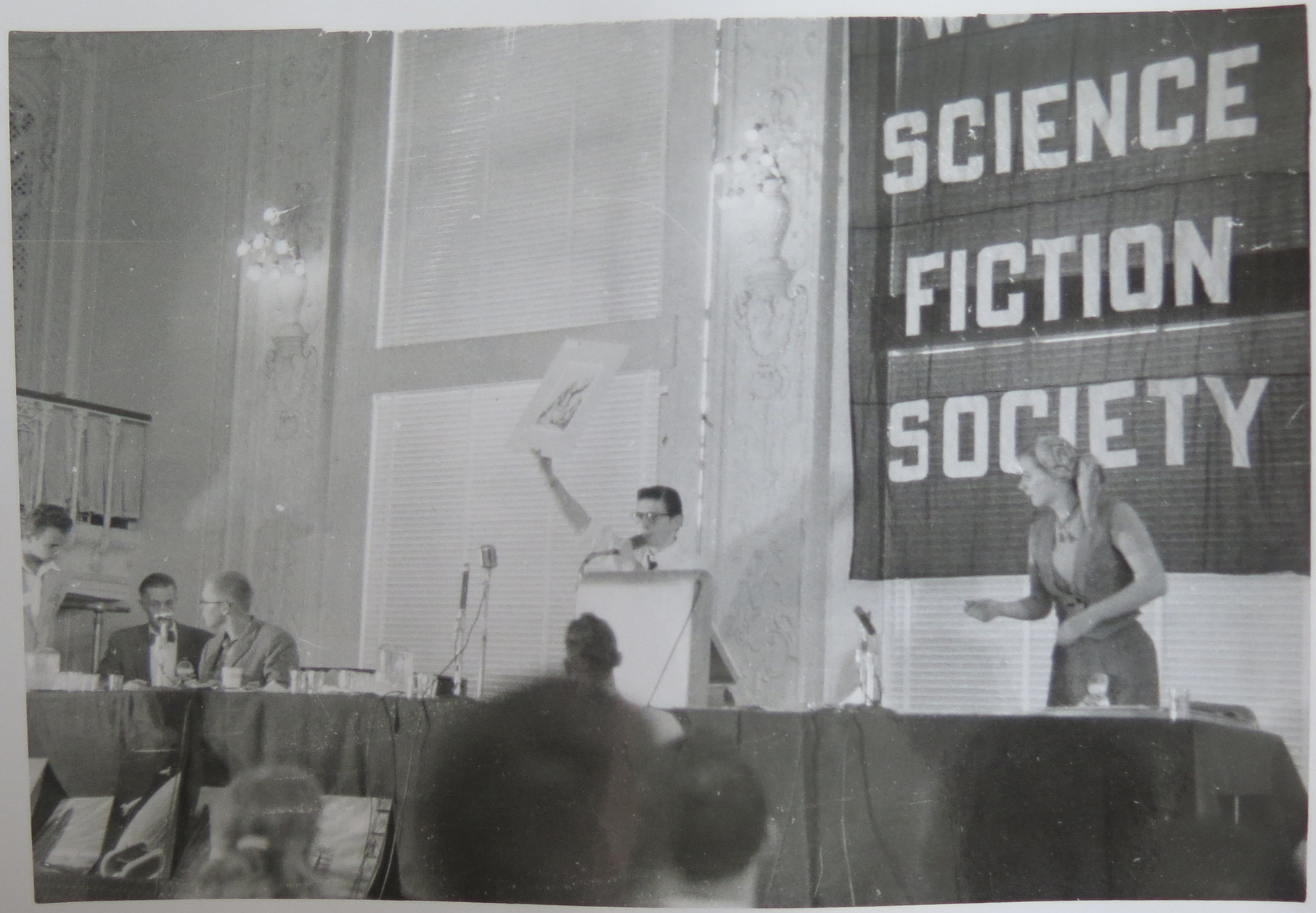
Banquet at the 14th World Science Fiction Convention in New York City in 1956

Science fiction fandom started through the letter column of Hugo Gernsback's fiction magazines. Not only did fans write comments about the stories—they sent their addresses, and Gernsback published them. Soon, fans were writing letters directly to each other, and meeting in person when they lived close together, or when one of them could manage a trip. In New York City, David Lasser, Gernsback's managing editor, nurtured the birth of a small local club called the Scienceers, which held its first meeting in a Harlem apartment on 11 December 1929. Almost all the members were adolescent boys. Around this time, a few other small local groups began to spring up in metropolitan areas around the United States, many of them connecting with fellow enthusiasts via the Science Correspondence Club. In May 1930 the first science-fiction fan magazine, The Comet, was produced by the Chicago branch of the Science Correspondence Club under the editorship of Raymond A. Palmer (later a noted, and notorious, sf magazine editor) and Walter Dennis. In January 1932, the New York City circle, which by then included future comic-book editors Julius Schwartz and Mort Weisinger, brought out the first issue of their own publication, The Time Traveller, with Forrest J Ackerman of the embryonic Los Angeles group as a contributing editor.

In 1934, Gernsback established a correspondence club for fans called the Science Fiction League, the first fannish organization. Local groups across the nation could join by filling out an application. A number of clubs came into being around this time. LASFS (the Los Angeles Science Fantasy Society) was founded at this time as a local branch of the SFL, while several competing local branches sprang up in New York City and immediately began feuding among themselves.

In 1935, PSFS (the Philadelphia Science Fiction Society, 1935–present) was formed. The next year, half a dozen fans from NYC came to Philadelphia to meet with the PSFS members, as the first Philadelphia Science Fiction Conference, which some claim as the world's first science fiction convention.

Soon after the fans started to communicate directly with each other came the creation of science fiction fanzines. These amateur publications might or might not discuss science fiction and were generally traded rather than sold. They ranged from the utilitarian or inept to professional-quality printing and editing. In recent years, Usenet newsgroups such as rec.arts.sf.fandom, websites and blogs have somewhat supplanted printed fanzines as an outlet for expression in fandom, though many popular fanzines continue to be published. Science-fiction fans have been among the first users of computers, email, personal computers and the Internet.

Many professional science fiction authors started their interest in science fiction as fans, and some still publish their own fanzines or contribute to those published by others.

A widely regarded (though by no means error-free) history of fandom in the 1930s can be found in Sam Moskowitz's The Immortal Storm: A History of Science Fiction Fandom (Hyperion Press, 1988, ISBN 0-88355-131-4; original edition The Atlanta Science Fiction Organization Press, Atlanta, Georgia 1954). Moskowitz was himself involved in some of the incidents chronicled and has his own point of view, which has often been criticized.

== By country ==
=== Sweden ===
Organized fandom in Sweden ("Sverifandom") emerged during the early 1950s. The first Swedish science fiction fanzine was started in the early 1950s. The oldest still existing club, Club Cosmos in Gothenburg, was formed in 1954, and the first Swedish science-fiction convention, LunCon, was held in Lund in 1956.

Today, there are a number of science fiction clubs in the country, including Scandinavian Society for Science Fiction (whose club fanzine, Science Fiction Forum, was once edited by Stieg Larsson, a board member and one-time chairman thereof), Linköpings Science Fiction-Förening and Sigma Terra Corps. Between one and four science-fiction conventions are held each year in Sweden, among them Swecon, the annual national Swedish con. An annual prize is awarded to someone that has contributed to the national fandom by the Alvar Appeltoffts Memorial Prize Fund.

=== UK ===
SF fandom in the UK has close ties with that in the US. In the UK there are multiple conventions. The largest regular convention for literary SF (book-focused) fandom is the British National convention or Eastercon. Strangely enough this is held over the Easter weekend. Committee membership and location changes year-to-year. The license to use the Eastercon name for a year is awarded by votes of the business meeting of the Eastercon two years previously. There are a variety of other local or intermittent conventions run by fandom, such as the series of Mexicons that ran from 1984 to 1994.

There are substantially larger events run by UK media fandom and commercial organisations also run "gate shows" (for-profit operations with paid staff.) The UK has also hosted the Worldcon several times, most recently in 2024. News of UK events appears in the fanzine Ansible produced by David Langford each month.

=== Italy ===
The beginning of an Italian science fiction fandom can be located between the late 1950s and early 1960s, when magazines such as Oltre il Cielo and Futuro started to publish readers' letters and promote correspondences and the setting-up of clubs in various cities. Among the first fanzines, Futuria Fantasia was cyclostyled in Milan in 1963 by Luigi Cozzi (later to become a filmmaker), its title paid homage to Ray Bradbury's fanzine by the same name; L'Aspidistra, edited by Riccardo Leveghi in Trento starting in 1965 featured contributions by Gianfranco de Turris, Gian Luigi Staffilano, and Sebastiano Fusco, future editors of professional magazines and book series; also Luigi Naviglio, editor in 1965 of the fanzine Nuovi Orizzonti, was soon to become a writer for I Romanzi del Cosmo. During subsequent years fanzines continued to function as training grounds for future editors and writers, and the general trend was towards improved quality and life expectancy (e.g. The Time Machine run for 50 issues starting in 1975, Intercom for 149 issues between 1979 and 1999, before its migration to the web as an e-zine until 2003, then as a website).

In 1963, the first Trieste Festival of Science Fiction Cinema took place, anticipating the first conventions as an opportunity for a nationwide social gathering. Informal meetings were organized in Milan, Turin and Carrara between 1965 and 1967. In 1972, the first European convention, Eurocon, was organized in Trieste, during which an Italia Award was also created. Eurocon was back in Italy in 1980 and 2009 (in 1989 a Eurocon was held in San Marino).

Since its foundation in 2013, the association World SF Italia coordinates the organization the annual national convention (Italcon) and awards (Premio Italia – with thirty- two categories across media – and Premio Vegetti – best Italian novel and essay).

== Conventions ==
Since the late 1930s, SF fans have organized conventions, non-profit gatherings where the fans (some of whom are also professionals in the field) meet to discuss SF and generally enjoy themselves. (A few fannish couples have held their weddings at conventions.) The 1st World Science Fiction Convention or Worldcon was held in conjunction with the 1939 New York World's Fair, and has been held annually since the end of World War II. Worldcon has been the premier convention in fandom for over half a century; it is at this convention that the Hugo Awards are bestowed, and attendance can approach 8,000 or more.

SF writer Cory Doctorow calls science fiction "perhaps the most social of all literary genres", and states, "Science fiction is driven by organized fandom, volunteers who put on hundreds of literary conventions in every corner of the globe, every weekend of the year."

SF conventions can vary from minimalist "relaxacons" with a hundred or so attendees to heavily programmed events with four to six or more simultaneous tracks of programming, such as WisCon and Worldcons.

Commercial shows dealing with SF-related fields are sometimes billed as 'science fiction conventions', but are operated as for-profit ventures, with an orientation towards passive spectators, rather than involved fans, and a tendency to neglect or ignore written SF in favor of television, film, comics, video games, etc. One of the largest of these is the annual Dragon*Con in Atlanta, Georgia, with an attendance of more than 20,000 since 2000.

== Science-fiction societies ==
In the United States, many science-fiction societies were launched as chapters of the Science Fiction League and, when it faded into history, several of the original League chapters remained viable and were subsequently incorporated as independent organizations. Most notable among the former League chapters which were spun off was the Philadelphia Science Fiction Society, which served as a model for subsequent SF societies formed independent of the League history.

Science-fiction societies, more commonly referred to as "clubs" except on the most formal of occasions, form a year-round base of activities for science-fiction fans. They are often associated with an SF convention or group of conventions, but maintain a separate existence as cultural institutions within specific geographic regions. Several have purchased property and maintain ongoing collections of SF literature available for research, as in the case of the Los Angeles Science Fantasy Society, the New England Science Fiction Association, and the Baltimore Science Fiction Society. Other SF Societies maintain a more informal existence, meeting at general public facilities or the homes of individual members, such as the Bay Area Science Fiction Association.

== Offshoots and subcommunities ==
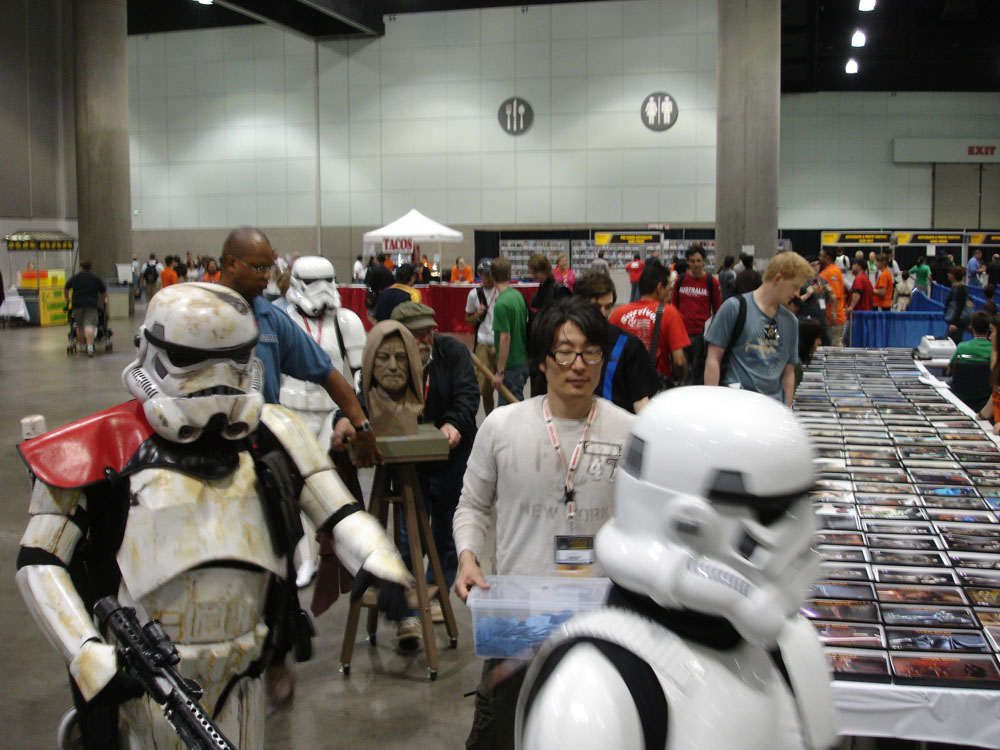
The 501st legion guards an Obi-Wan bust at Star Wars Celebration IV.

As a community devoted to discussion and exploration of new ideas, fandom has become an incubator for many groups that started out as special interests within fandom, some of which have partially separated into independent intentional communities not directly associated with science fiction. Among these groups are comic book fandom, media fandom, the Society for Creative Anachronism, gaming, and furry fandom, sometimes referred to collectively as "fringe fandoms" with the implication that the original fandom centered on science-fiction texts (magazines and later books and fanzines) is the "true" or "core" fandom. Fandom also welcomes and shares interest with other groups including LGBT communities, libertarians, neo-pagans, and space activist groups like the L5 Society, among many others. Some groups exist almost entirely within fandom but are distinct and cohesive subcultures in their own rights, such as filkers, costumers, and convention runners (sometimes called "SMOFs").

Fandom encompasses subsets of fans that are principally interested in a single writer or subgenre, such as Tolkien fandom, and Star Trek fandom ("Trekkies"). Even short-lived television series may have dedicated followings, such as the fans of Joss Whedon's Firefly television series and movie Serenity, known as Browncoats.

Participation in science fiction fandom often overlaps with other similar interests, such as fantasy role-playing games, comic books and anime, and in the broadest sense fans of these activities are felt to be part of the greater community of SF fandom.

There are active SF fandoms around the world. Fandom in non-Anglophone countries is based partially on local literature and media, with cons and other elements resembling those of English-speaking fandom, but with distinguishing local features. For example, Finland's national gathering Finncon is funded by the government, while all conventions and fan activities in Japan are heavily influenced by anime and manga.

== Fanspeak ==
Science fiction and fantasy fandom has its own slang or jargon, sometimes called "fanspeak" (the term has been in use since at least 1962).

Fanspeak is made up of acronyms, blended words, obscure in-jokes, and standard terms used in specific ways. Some terms used in fanspeak have spread to members of the Society for Creative Anachronism ("Scadians"), Renaissance Fair participants ("Rennies"), hacktivists, and internet gaming and chat fans, due to the social and contextual intersection between the communities. Examples of fanspeak used in these broader fannish communities include gafiate, a term meaning to drop out of SF related community activities, with the implication to Get A Life. The word is derived via the acronym for "get away from it all". A related term is fafiate, for "forced away from it all". The implication is that one would really rather still be involved in fandom, but circumstances make it impossible.

Two other acronyms commonly used in the community are FIAWOL (Fandom Is A Way Of Life) and its opposite FIJAGH (Fandom Is Just A Goddamned Hobby) to describe two ways of looking at the place of fandom in one's life.

Science-fiction fans often refer to themselves using the irregular plural "fen": man/men, fan/fen.

=== Fanac ===
Fanac is a fan slang term (from fannish activities) for activities within the realm of science fiction fandom, and occasionally used in media fandom. It may be distinguished from fan labor in that "fanac" includes the publication of science fiction fanzines of the traditional kind (i.e., not primarily devoted to fan fiction), and the organization and maintenance of science fiction conventions and science fiction clubs.

"Fanac" has also been used as a title for at least two science fiction fanzines, one published by Terry Carr and Ron Ellik, and later continued by Walter H. Breen, in the late 1950s through early 1960s; and the other published by Swedish fan John-Henri Holmberg from 1963 to 1994.

== In fiction ==
As science fiction fans became professional writers, they started slipping the names of their friends into stories. Wilson "Bob" Tucker slipped so many of his fellow fans and authors into his works that doing so is called tuckerization.

The subgenre of "recursive science fiction" has a fan-maintained bibliography at the New England Science Fiction Association's website; some of it is about science fiction fandom, some not.

In Robert Bloch's 1956 short story, "A Way Of Life", science-fiction fandom is the only institution to survive a nuclear holocaust and eventually becomes the basis for the reconstitution of civilization. The science-fiction novel Gather in the Hall of the Planets, by K.M. O'Donnell (aka Barry N. Malzberg), 1971, takes place at a New York City science-fiction convention and features broad parodies of many SF fans and authors. A pair of SF novels by Gene DeWeese and Robert "Buck" Coulson, Now You See It/Him/Them and Charles Fort Never Mentioned Wombats are set at Worldcons; the latter includes an in-character "introduction" by Wilson Tucker (himself a character in the novel) which is a sly self-parody verging on a self-tuckerization.

The 1991 SF novel Fallen Angels by Larry Niven, Jerry Pournelle and Michael Flynn constitutes a tribute to SF fandom. The story includes a semi-illegal fictional Minneapolis Worldcon in a post-disaster world where science, and thus fandom, is disparaged. Many of the characters are barely tuckerized fans, mostly from the Greater Los Angeles area.

Mystery writer Sharyn McCrumb's Bimbos of the Death Sun and Zombies of the Gene Pool are murder mysteries set at a science-fiction convention and within the broader culture of fandom respectively. While containing mostly nasty caricatures of fans and fandom, some fans take them with good humor; others consider them vicious and cruel.

In 1994 and 1996, two anthologies of alternate history science fiction involving World Science Fiction Conventions, titled Alternate Worldcons and Again, Alternate Worldcons, edited by Mike Resnick were published.

=== Fans are slans ===
A.E. van Vogt's 1940 novel Slan was about a mutant variety of humans who are superior to regular humanity and are therefore hunted down and killed by the normal human population. While the story has nothing to do with fandom, many science-fiction fans felt very close to the protagonists, feeling their experience as bright people in a mundane world mirrored that of the mutants; hence, the rallying cry, "Fans Are Slans!"; and the tradition that a building inhabited primarily by fans can be called a slan shack.

=== Figures in the history of fandom ===
- Forrest J Ackerman
- Isaac Asimov
- John Bangsund
- Johannes Berg
- James Blish
- John Boardman
- Walter Breen
- Charles N. Brown
- Kenneth Bulmer
- Terry Carr
- Russ Chauvenet
- Vin¢ Clarke
- Willis Conover
- Walter A. Coslet
- Howard DeVore
- Malcolm Edwards
- Jan Howard Finder
- Leslie Fish
- Don Ford
- Richard E. Geis
- Bruce Gillespie
- Mike Glyer
- Steve Green
- Dean Grennell
- William Hamling
- Rusty Hevelin
- Lee Hoffman
- John-Henri Holmberg
- Ted Johnstone
- Earl Kemp
- Roy Kettle
- Virginia Kidd
- Damon Knight
- Samuel Edward Konkin III
- Cyril M. Kornbluth
- David Kyle
- David Langford
- Stieg Larsson
- Robert A. W. Lowndes
- Sam Lundwall
- Richard A. Lupoff
- Judith Merril
- Sandra Miesel
- Michael Moorcock
- Sam Moskowitz
- Tom Ölander
- Ray Palmer
- Emil Petaja
- Greg Pickersgill
- Frederik Pohl
- Andy Porter
- Fletcher Pratt
- E. Hoffmann Price
- Tom Reamy
- Frank M. Robinson
- Milton A. Rothman
- William Rotsler
- Don Sakers
- Christoffer Schander
- Julius Schwartz
- George Scithers
- Bob Shaw
- Larry Shaw
- Clifford Simak
- Ken Slater
- Dan Steffan
- Steve Stiles
- Erwin Strauss
- Roy Tackett
- Arthur Thomson
- Bjo Trimble
- Donald H. Tuck
- Bob Tucker
- Martin Tudor
- Harry Warner Jr.
- Bill Warren
- Taral Wayne
- Mort Weisinger
- Peter Weston
- Ted White
- Walt Willis
- Donald A. Wollheim

== See also ==
- Aelita Prize
- Anime and manga fandom
- Birmingham Science Fiction Group
- British Science Fiction Association
- Brony
- The Eye of Argon
- Eurocon
- Fanboy
- First Fandom
- Fantasy fandom
- Gaylactic Network
- MSTie
- Otaku
- Star Wars Insider
- Trans-Atlantic Fan Fund (TAFF)
- Whovian
- Gater
