= Delta Film Award =

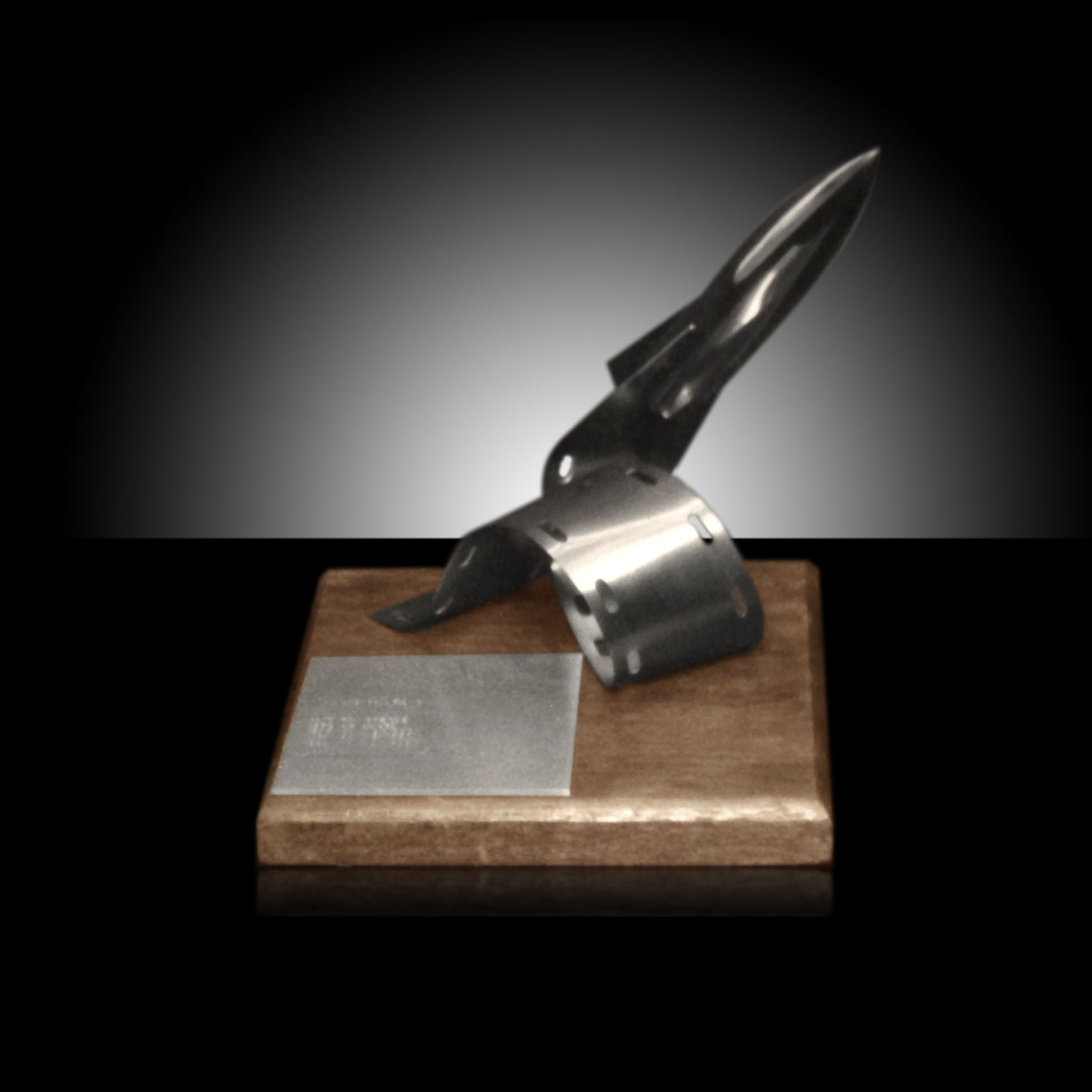
The original Delta Film Award. Its current location is not known.

The Delta Film Award was presented annually to the best amateur film screened at the Festival of Fantastic Films in Manchester, England from 1990. The awards relaunched for the 2022 festival as a new short film competition, including a best-in-festival award.

Now plural, the Delta Film Awards are named in honour of the Delta group of amateur filmmakers whose efforts enlivened 1960s British science fiction conventions. Members included Tony Edwards and the late Harry Nadler, founding members along with Gil Lane-Young of the Society of Fantastic Films, which oversaw the Manchester festival.

The Delta Film Award celebrated significant achievement by low-budget directors.

The award was relaunched for the 2022 festival with a new short film competition following the death of Gil Lane-Young, with a committee of festivalgoers agreeing to update the annual Festival of Fantastic Films in Manchester while retaining the event's unique atmosphere and intimate feel. The festival gained a new website and revamped social media presence.

For the first time in 2022, Delta film submissions are via the Film Freeway website. Awards will be given in three categories: Horror, Fantasy, and Science Fiction. No film submitted can be longer than 20 minutes. The award continues to attract international interest.

A new best-in-festival award was also announced in honour of the late British horror film director Norman J. Warren, a regular attendee at the Manchester festival. Entries are being overseen by Darrell Buxton, with the chair of judges for 2022 named as Warren's long-time friend and collaborator, screenwriter and critic David McGillivray.

Previous Delta judges have included Warren himself, freelance journalist Steve Green (also awards administrator for many years), film journalists M J Simpson, Calum Waddell, Darrell Buxton and Tris Thompson, horror author Stephen Gallagher, former Critical Wave reviewer Ray Holloway and actor David Hess.

The following information was researched from various sources by Steve Green and George Houston and it is, to their knowledge, as accurate as the sources suggest:

- Recipient of the 1990 Delta Film Award - Ian Simpson (UK) for Mean Time.
- Recipient of the 1991 Delta Film Award - Ian Simpson (UK) for Time Flies.
- Recipient of the 1992 Delta Film Award - Ian Simpson (UK) for The Telephone People.
- Recipient of the 1993 Delta Film Award - Andrew Garrison (USA) for Night Ride.
- Recipient of the 1994 Delta Film Award - Simon J Frith (UK) for Deep In the Woods.
- The 1995 Delta Film Award was awarded to joint winners, one of which was Blast Films (UK) for I Was a Fifty Foot Führer.
- Recipient of the 1996 Delta Film Award - Andrew Muscroft (UK) for The Lover.
- Recipients of the 1997 Delta Film Award - Keith Wright and Rob Richardson (UK) for The Legend of Roy.
- Recipient of the 1998 Delta Film Award - Shane Hannefey (USA) for The Gift.
- Recipient of the 1999 Delta Film Award - Ben Campbell (UK) for Abduction.
- Recipients of the 2000 Delta Film Award - Nova Jacobs and John Sinclair (USA) for Schrödinger's Cat.
- Recipient of the 2001 Delta Film Award - Bryn Jones (Canada) for Jesabelle.
- Recipient of the 2002 Delta Film Award - Al Lougher (UK) for I Am Peter Cushing.
- Recipient of the 2003 Delta Film Award - Robin Burke (UK) for Tilted Love.
- Recipient of the 2004 Delta Film Award - Brett Harvey for The Curse.
- Recipient of the 2005 Delta Film Award - Ross Shepherd (UK) for Kingdom of Shadows.
- Recipient of the 2006 Delta Film Award - Karl Holt (UK) for Eddie Loves You.
- Recipient of the 2007 Delta Film Award - Jean Luc Baillet (France) for Contretemps.
- Recipient of the 2008 Delta Film Award - Matt Bloom (UK) for Small Things.
- Recipient of the 2009 Delta Film Award - Kyle Stephens (USA) for McDonough.
- Recipient of the 2010 Delta Film Award - Lucas Martell (USA) for Pigeon: Impossible.
- Recipient of the 2011 Delta Film Award - Damian McCarthy (Eire) for Hatch.
- Recipient of the 2012 Delta Film Award - Zoe Berriatúa (Spain) for Quedaté Conmigo.
- Recipient of the 2013 Delta Film Award - Liam Engle (France) for Mecs Meufs.
