= Peter Weston =

British writer and science fiction fan (1943–2017)

Peter Weston

Peter Weston (19 October 1943 – 5 January 2017) was a British science fiction fan from Birmingham, UK.

Weston made many contributions in fan writing, fanzine editing, convention-running and in local science fiction clubs. His 1960s pseudonym "Malcolm Edwards" caused some confusion several years later, when a real Malcolm Edwards began contributing to British fanzines. They met in 1970.

He produced the first issue of the science fiction fanzine Zenith (later Speculation) in 1963 and he edited the Andromeda series of original anthologies from 1975 until 1977. In 2006, following the success of his Hugo-nominated memoir With Stars in My Eyes, Weston relaunched his fanzine Prolapse (re-titled Relapse in 2009), after a 23-year hiatus. He was rewarded with a pair of Nova Awards the following year, for "best fanzine" and "best fan" (the latter being a committee award).

As well as organising a series of science fiction symposia in Birmingham inspired by Speculation, Weston co-founded the Birmingham Science Fiction Group (BSFG) in 1971 and helped originate the convention Novacon later that same year. He later chaired Seacon '79, the third Worldcon to be held in the UK, and in October 2008 ran Cytricon V at the George Hotel in Kettering, a sequel to and commemoration of the event at which the modern British Science Fiction Association was created. At the last, a surprise ceremony was held, inducting him and fellow fan Rog Peyton (co-founder of the modern Birmingham Science Fiction Group) into the long-dormant "fannish" organisation the Knights of Saint Fantony.

From 1984 onwards, the Hugo Awards (modelled in the shape of rockets and presented at the annual Worldcon) have been cast by the car-parts factory which Weston owned and managed until he retired.

== Awards and honours ==
- 1965, 1966, 1970, 1971 nominee for Hugo Award for Best Fanzine
- 1973 Nova award winner, "best fanzine" for Speculation
- 1974 TAFF winner
- 1975 Doc Weir Award winner
- 2005 nominee for Hugo Award for Best Related Book for With Stars in My Eyes: My Adventures in British Fandom
- 2007 Nova award winner, "best fanzine" for Prolapse
- 2007 Nova award winner, "best fan" (committee award)

He has been an official guest at a number of conventions, including:

- 1974 Fan Guest of Honour: Tynecon
- 2000 Special Guest: Boskone 37
- 2002 Guest of Honour: Helicon 2
- 2004 Fan Guest of Honor: Noreascon 4 (2004 Worldcon)
