= Jo L. Walton =

British poet, fiction writer, and editor (born 1982)

Joseph Churches Lindsay Walton (born 15 April 1982) is a British poet, fiction writer, and editor.

== Background ==
Jo Lindsay Walton is the author of at least thirteen published works of poetry, fiction, and experimental writing. He is known for his use of pseudonymity, also publishing under names such as Lorqi Blinks (in collaboration with Samantha Walton), Harvey Joseph (in collaboration with James Harvey), Helen Bridwell (in collaboration with August Highland), Francis Crot, Ian Heames, Andy Spragg, Jow Lindsay, and Kyle Storm Beste-Chetwynde.

Together with Samantha Walton he runs the poetry press Sad Press. His other editorial roles include formerly co-editing the poetry press Bad Press, and currently co-editing Vector, the reviews journal of the British Science Fiction Association.

Walton has performed his work widely both in the UK and abroad, including the Cork International Poetry Festival SoundEye, the Edinburgh International Book Festival, and Biennale International des Poètes en Val-de-Marne. He studied at Northumbria University, and lives in Bristol.

== Books and Pamphlets ==
- Francis Crot, The Cuntomatic (yt communication, 2007)
- Francis Crot and Nour Mobarak, The Seven Curses (Critical Documents, 2008)
- Francis Crot, Pressure in Cheshire (Veer Books, 2009)
- The Two Brothers, Finite Love (Critical Documents and Bad Press, 2010)
- Yolanda Tudor-Bloch, The Woman: A Song City Memoir (Department No. 2, 2010)
- Francis Crot, Hax (Punch Press, 2011)
- Megan Sword and Timpani Skullface, Superior City Song (Critical Documents, 2012)
- Colleen Hind and Pocahontas Mildew, We Are Real (Critical Documents, 2012)
- Harvey Joseph and Lindsay James, Sea Adventures, or, Pond Life (RunAmok Press, 2012)
- Jo L. Walton / Jo Lindsay Walton, Invocation (Critical Documents, 2013)
- Goat Far Dale Turbo and Papa Boop Ndiop, Animal Crater (Crater Press, 2013)
- Jo Lindsay Walton, Marta and the Demons (Preyed Press, 2014)
- Ten Laws (Sad Press, 2015)
- Jo Lindsay Walton, Meet Me in the Tall Grass (Sad Press, 2017)
- Jana Kleineberg, Polina Levontin, Jo Lindsay Walton, Visualising Uncertainty: A Short Introduction (AU4DM, 2020)
- Jo Lindsay Walton (ed), Utopia on the Tabletop (Ping, 2024)

== Short fiction ==
- Please Don't Let Go
- Cat, I Must Work!
- Oh God, the Dogs!
- In Arms
- Froggy Goes Piggy (at The Long+Short)
- It's OK to Say if You Went Back in Time and Killed Baby Hitler
- Cowards Are Great!

== Essays and Talks ==
- Post-Marginal Positions: Women and the UK Experimental/Avant-Garde Poetry Community in Jacket
- Away Day: Star Trek and the Utopia of Merit
- Poets as Activists at Militant Poetics

== Poetry ==
- Poems by Kyle Storm Beste-Chetwynde (in Onedit)
- Poem by Karen Eliot (in Past Simple)
