= A Touch of Sturgeon =

Collection of stories by Theodore Sturgeon

A Touch of Sturgeon is a collection by Theodore Sturgeon published in 1987.

== Plot summary ==
A Touch of Sturgeon is a compilation of eight stories.

== Reception ==
Dave Langford reviewed A Touch of Sturgeon for White Dwarf #94, and stated that "perhaps the only long-established SF writer to have consistently worked not only with gadgets but also with strong human emotions."

== Reviews ==
- Review by Dan Chow (1987) in Locus, #319 August 1987
- Review by Mike Moir (1988) in Vector 143
