= Down Under Fan Fund =

The Down Under Fan Fund, also known as DUFF, was created in 1970 for the purpose of providing funds to bring well-known and popular members of science fiction fandom familiar to fans on both sides of the Pacific Ocean.

== History ==
DUFF was created by John Foyster in 1970 as a means of increasing the face-to-face communication between science fiction fans in Australia and New Zealand, and North America. It coincides with the push within Australian fandom to host the World Science Fiction Convention in Australia in 1975, (Aussiecon), and the rise of fanzine fandom centred on Melbourne, Australia; e.g. Australian SF Review, SF Commentary, ANZAPA. He based the procedures of DUFF on the already-existing Trans-Atlantic Fan Fund (TAFF), which began in 1952.

== Funding ==
DUFF is funded through the support of fandom. Candidates are voted on by interested fans all over the world, and each vote is accompanied by a donation of not less than $US5 or A$6. These donations, and the continued generosity of fandom, are what make the whole concept of these fan funds possible.

In addition to donations, fans hold auctions at science fiction conventions to raise money for DUFF. Frequently art, books, T-shirts, and other ephemera of fandom are auctioned off for this purpose.

== Procedure ==
Each candidate posts a bond, promising to travel (if elected) to a major convention on the other side of the Pacific; and has provided signed nominations and a platform.

Voting is by secret ballot, using instant-runoff voting; and is open to anyone who has been active in fandom for the prior year or more and who contributes to the Fund. Ballots are signed, to prevent ballot-box stuffing and to enable the election administrators to identify each voter as a known member of fandom.

Although the winner is expected to attend Worldcon or a specific national convention, DUFF delegates generally also tour the country before and/or after the convention in order to meet a variety of fans.

Winning DUFF candidates are expected to write a trip report, which customarily takes the form of a fanzine or a series of fanzine articles. These fanzines are sometimes sold in order to help raise funds towards future DUFF trips. In addition, winners take over the administration of the fund for their region (Australia/NZ or North America) for two years until the next regional DUFF delegate is selected. At any given time, there are at least two administrators, one for each region.

== List of DUFF winners ==
Past DUFF winners by year. Westbound races (ex-US) are marked << and eastbound (ex-Australasia) >>.

- 1972 << Lesleigh Luttrell
- 1974 >> Leigh Edmonds
- 1975 << Rusty Hevelin
- 1976 >> Christine McGowan
- 1977 << Bill Rotsler
- 1978 >> Paul Stevens
- 1979 << Ken Fletcher & Linda Lounsbury
- 1980 >> Keith Curtis
- 1981 << Joyce Scrivner
- 1982 >> Peter Toluzzi
- 1983 << Jerry Kaufman
- 1984 >> Jack Herman
- 1985 << Marty & Robbie Cantor
- 1986 >> Nick Stathopoulos, Lewis Morley, Marilyn Pride
- 1987 << Lucy Huntzinger
- 1988 >> Terry Dowling
- 1989 << John D Berry
- 1990 >> Greg Turkich
- 1991 << Art Widner
- 1992 >> Roger Weddall
- 1993 << Dick Smith & Leah Zeldes Smith
- 1994 >> Alan Stewart
- 1995 << Pat & Roger Sims
- 1996 >> Perry Middlemiss
- 1997 << Janice Murray
- 1998 >> Terry Frost
- 1999 << Janice Gelb
- 2000 >> Cathy Cupitt
- 2001 << Naomi Fisher & Patrick Molloy
- 2002 >> Julian Warner
- 2003 << Guy & Rosy Lillian
- 2004 >> Norman Cates
- 2005 << Joe Siclari
- 2008 << Steve and Sue Francis
- 2009 >> Emma Hawkes
- 2010 << John Hertz
- 2011 >> David Cake
- 2012 No race held
- 2013 >> Bill Wright
- 2014 << Juanita Coulson
- 2015 No race held
- 2016 >> Clare McDonald-Sims
- 2017 << Paul Weimer
- 2018 >> Marlee Jane Ward
- 2019 No race held
- 2020 << Erin Underwood

== See also ==
- TransAtlantic Fan Fund (TAFF)
