= Trans-Atlantic Fan Fund =

The Trans-Atlantic Fan Fund, often known as TAFF, is a crowdfunding project created in 1953 for the purpose of providing funds to bring well-known and popular members of science fiction fandom familiar to fans on both sides of the ocean, across the Atlantic.

== History ==
The first international fan fund, the Big Pond Fund, was established to get Ted Carnell to the 1947 Worldcon, though it was the 1949 Worldcon he eventually attended. TAFF's roots lie in the successful effort to bring Walt Willis to the 1952 Worldcon in Chicago. Willis published the founding document for TAFF in Hyphen 4 (October 1953) following a discussion with "the available leaders of British fandom" at that year's Coroncon. Since that time TAFF has regularly brought North American fans to European conventions and European fans to North American conventions. The success of TAFF has inspired other regular fan funds between North America and Australia, Europe and Australia, and even Eastern and Western Canada.

== Funding ==
TAFF is funded through the support of fandom. Candidates are voted on by interested fans all over the world, and each vote is accompanied by a donation of not less than $4 or £3 or €4. These donations, and the continued generosity of fandom, are what make TAFF possible.

In addition to donations, fans hold auctions at science fiction conventions to raise money for TAFF. Frequently art, books, T-shirts, and other ephemera of fandom are auctioned off for this purpose.

== Procedure ==
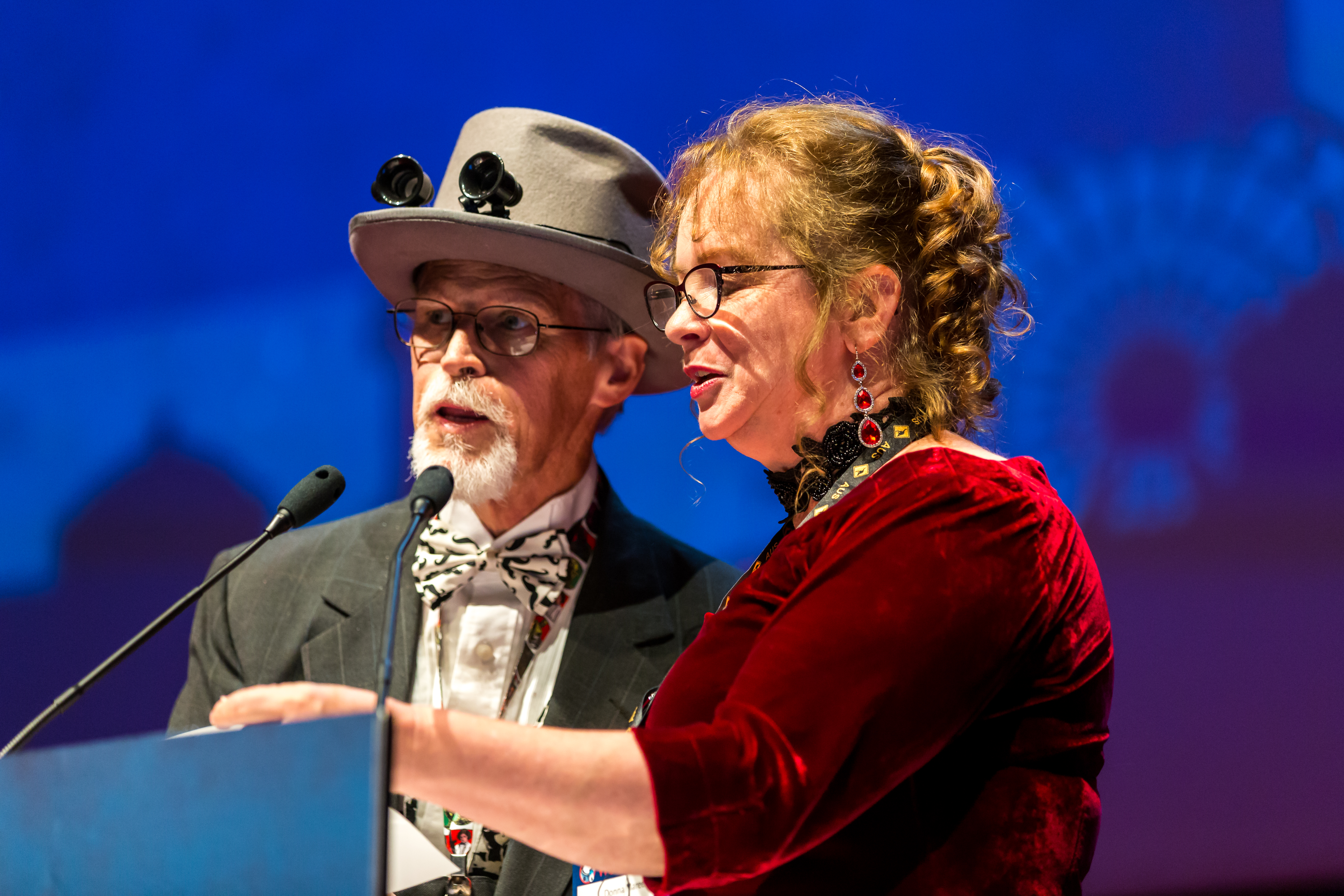
TAFF delegate John Purcell together with GUFF delegate Donna Maree Hanson at the Hugo Award ceremony at Worldcon in Helsinki 2017.

Each candidate posts a bond, promising to travel (if elected) to a major convention on the other side of the Atlantic; and has provided signed nominations and a platform.

Voting is by secret ballot, using instant-runoff voting; and is open to anyone who has been active in fandom for the prior year or more and who contributes to the Fund. Ballots are signed, to prevent ballot-box stuffing and to enable the election administrators to identify each voter as a known member of fandom.

Although the winner is expected to attend Worldcon or a specific national convention, TAFF delegates generally also tour the country before and after the convention in order to meet a variety of fans.

Winning TAFF candidates are expected to write a trip report, which customarily takes the form of a fanzine or a series of fanzine articles. These fanzines are sometimes sold in order to help raise funds towards future TAFF trips. In addition, winners take over the administration of the fund for their region (Europe or North America) until the next regional TAFF delegate is selected (usually a period of two years, unless the next race is delayed). At any given time, there are at least two administrators, one for each region.

== List of TAFF winners ==
Past TAFF winners by year. Westbound races are marked ← and eastbound →.

- 1952 ← Walt Willis
- 1954 ← Vin¢ Clarke
- 1955 ← Ken Bulmer
- 1956 → Lee Hoffman
- 1957 → Robert A Madle
- 1958 ← Ron Bennett
- 1959 → Don Ford
- 1960 ← Eric Bentcliffe
- 1961 → Ron Ellik
- 1962 ← Ethel Lindsay
- 1963 → Wally Weber
- 1964 ← Arthur Thomson ("Atom")
- 1965 → Terry Carr
- 1966 ← Thomas Schlück
- 1968 → Steve Stiles
- 1969 ← Eddie Jones
- 1970 → Elliot K Shorter
- 1971 ← Mario Bosnyak
- 1973 → Len & June Moffatt
- 1974 ← Peter Weston
- 1976 → Bill Bowers & Roy Tackett (tie)
- 1977 ← Peter Roberts
- 1979 → Terry Hughes
- 1980 ← Dave Langford
- 1981 → Stu Shiffman
- 1982 ← Kevin Smith
- 1983 → Avedon Carol
- 1984 ← Rob Hansen
- 1985 → Patrick Nielsen Hayden & Teresa Nielsen Hayden
- 1986 ← Greg Pickersgill
- 1987 → Jeanne Gomoll
- 1988 ← Lilian Edwards & Christina Lake
- 1989 → Robert Lichtman
- 1991 ← Pam Wells
- 1992 → Jeanne Bowman
- 1993 ← Abigail Frost
- 1995 → Dan Steffan
- 1996 ← Martin Tudor
- 1998 → Ulrika O'Brien
- 1998 ← Maureen Kincaid Speller
- 1999 → Velma J Bowen ("Vijay")
- 2000 ← Sue Mason
- 2001 → Victor M. Gonzalez
- 2002 ← Tobes Valois
- 2003 → Randy Byers
- 2004 ← James Bacon
- 2005 → Suzanne Tompkins ("Suzle")
- 2006 ← Bridget Bradshaw ("Bug")
- 2008 → Christopher J Garcia
- 2009 ← Steve Green
- 2010 → Anne KG Murphy & Brian Gray (joint)
- 2011 ← John Coxon
- 2012 → Jacqueline Monahan
- 2013 ← Jim Mowatt
- 2014 → Curt Phillips
- 2015 ← Nina Horvath
- 2016 ← Anna Raftery
- 2017 → John Purcell
- 2018 ← Johan Anglemark
- 2019 → Geri Sullivan
- 2020 → Michael J. "Orange Mike" Lowrey
- 2022 ← Sofia "Fia" Karlsson
- 2023 ← Sandra Bond

There were no TAFF races in 1953, 1967, 1972, 1975, 1978, 1990, 1994, and 1997.

The second 1998 race was announced to "catch up" after the lack of a 1997 race.

The 2007 race between Chris Garcia and Mary Kay Kare was cancelled due to the cancellation of the 2007 Eastercon; Garcia stood again in 2008 and won.

The direction of the 2016 race was switched by the administrators (Nina Horvath, Jim Mowatt and Curt Phillips) to align with the 2017 Worldcon being held in Helsinki, Finland, and the likelihood of the 2019 Worldcon being held in Dublin, Ireland.

The race for 2020 was again east-bound, and was to send a North American TAFF delegate to the 2020 Eastercon and Swecon. Due to the COVID-19 pandemic and attendant travel restrictions, the 2020 winner started his trip in April 2022, beginning with the 2022 Eurocon in Luxembourg and continuing with the 2022 Eastercon "Reclamation".

There was no 2021 TAFF race.

== See also ==
- Down Under Fan Fund (DUFF)
