= Vin¢ Clarke =

British science fiction fan (1922–1998)

Aubrey Vincent Clarke (1922–1998), often known as Vin¢ Clarke, was a well-known British science fiction fan.

He first made contact with fandom in 1938, and was active as a fanwriter and editor from 1948, including Science Fantasy News. He shared the fannish Epicentre flat in London with Ken Bulmer (with whom he collaborated on some sf novels). He was the first winner of the TransAtlantic Fan Fund (TAFF) in 1954, but was unable to take the trip. He was active in running conventions, including the 1957 Worldcon, Loncon I. In 1958 he helped inspire the formation of the British Science Fiction Association. He dropped almost all contact with fans in 1960 after his wife Joy left him for fellow fan Sandy Sanderson, and did not return to fandom until 1982. He was Fan Guest of Honour at the 1995 Worldcon, Intersection. In his later years he remained active in fandom, maintaining an extensive library of Science Fiction fanzines, co-editing the fanzine Pulp and contributing to work documenting UK fannish history. He died on 29 November 1998 from pneumonia following a long illness.
