= Martin Tudor =

Martin Tudor may refer to:

- Martin Tudor (footballer) (1976–2020), Romanian football player
- Martin Tudor (science fiction activist) (born 1959), British fanzine editor/writer
