= Sigma Terra Corps =

Sigma Terra Corps, Sigma TC, is a Swedish science fiction club, founded 5 December 1976 in Saltsjöbaden by Wolf von Witting, Jörg Litschke and Johan Richter.

== History ==
It was in the beginning one of many fan-clubs devoted to the German space opera-series Perry Rhodan, but this changed early on to a more general interest in speculative fiction. The club peaked in 1982 with more than 220 members, in Germany and Sweden. Its German branch withered away by the end of the 1980s.

Ralph Lundsten became a member in 1979 and hosted several gatherings in his studio and home, Villa Frankenburg. He also composed the jingle for Sigma TC's radio show, which was broadcast on Stockholm's local radio in 1982.

In 1980 the club initiated a sequence of local science fiction conventions, NasaCon, running for 11 consecutive years. The name of the convention was an abbreviation of Nacka Saltsjöbaden's convention. Ralph Lundsten was "Guest of Honour" at the first event in 1980. NasaCon also featured the journalist Anders Palm in 1981, Lars-Olov Strandberg in 1984, Per Insulander in 1985, the author Jörgen Peterzén in 1986, Hans Arnold in 1987 and Norwegian author Øyvind Myhre and Swedish artist Carl Johan De Geer in 1988. The main production behind the convention was done by Wolf von Witting, George Bobjörk (both from 1980) and Ahrvid Engholm (from 1981 on). John-Henri Holmberg was president of the first one in 1980, Anders Pemer of number 9 in 1988.

NasaCon 11 was hosted in Nacka Conference Center on 6–8 July in 1990. Guests of Honour were Brian Aldiss, Harry Harrison and Sam J Lundwall. During the years 1992-1996 all activities of the club were officially suspended, but many former members kept meeting simply out of common interests. This led to a re-launch of activities in 1997.

7-9 July 2000, NasaCon was also Swecon, the national Swedish convention. Guests of Honour were Brian Stableford and John-Henri Holmberg. The convention was run in a joint operation with Stockholm Trekkers. The event received considerable attention in media, with covering reports on TV, radio and major newspapers.

Members of Sigma TC also collaborated on SWECON'83, SWECON'85, Junicon'99, Fantastika 2001 and Stocon 2002. After 2008 the activities in the club again went into decline.

== Special events ==
- An exhibition about science fiction, in January 1987 at the library in Fisksätra, with lectures among others by Swedish author Sten Andersson and Ahrvid Engholm.

== Publications in Swedish ==
- Tid & Rymd, the club-magazine (various editors), appeared with 20 issues between 1979 and 1989.
- Nasacon 9 Programbok, 1988, editors: Anders Pemer and Ahrvid Engholm. Was branded as issue #4,5B of Anders Pemer's Hitchhiker's guide fanzine Sidan 42.
- Fannibal & Elefanten, news fanzine, 25 issues 1989–1991, editors: Mats Lignell, Anders Pemer and Wolf von Witting.
- NasaCon 10 Programbok, 1989, editors: Olle Sahlin and Anders Pemer.
- NasaCon 11 Programbok, 1990, editor: Mats Lignell.
- JuniCon 1999 Programbok, editor: Wolf von Witting.
- NasaCon 2000 Programbok, editor: Anders Reuterswärd.
- Sigma TC Info, news leaflet after 1997, editor: George Bobjörk.
