= S.F. Digest =

UK science fiction magazine

SF Digest
- Issue 1
- Editor: Julie Davis
- Categories: Science fiction magazine
- Frequency: Quarterly
- Publisher: New English Library
- First issue: 1976
- Country: United Kingdom

S.F. Digest was a small bedsheet magazine published by New English Library (NEL), intended to become a quarterly publication. The magazine was aimed at a more mature readership than its predecessor, putting more emphasis on fiction than the more artwork-oriented Science Fiction Monthly. The editor for the one and only issue was Julie Davis, and the cover art was produced by David Bergen. After one issue of S.F. Digest was published, NEL left the science fiction magazine market.

== Sources ==
- Ashley, Mike (2007). Gateways to Forever: The Story of the Science-Fiction Magazines from 1970 to 1980. Liverpool: Liverpool University Press. ISBN 978-1-84631-003-4.
