= Critical Wave =

Critical Wave #6, published 1988. Logo and typeface designed by Kevin Clarke; illustration by Iain Byers, based upon a design by Steve Green.

Critical Wave, later subtitled "The European Science Fiction & Fantasy Review", was a British small-press magazine, initially published and co-edited by Steve Green and Martin Tudor during the period 1987–96. There was also a short-lived US edition in the late 1980s.

Many authors and artists contributed to the original 46 issues, including Graham Joyce, Michael Moorcock, David A Hardy, Stephen Baxter, Colin Greenland, Charles Stross, Joel Lane, Iain M Banks, Arthur "ATom" Thomson, David A. Hardy, Iain Byers, Dave Mooring, Jim Porter, Sue Mason, Michael Marrak, Harry Turner and Kevin Cullen. Once Critical Wave became fully typeset, Kevin Clarke joined as resident designer.

Despite the immense enthusiasm displayed by many of its readers, Critical Wave only continued to appear with extensive financial input from its editors and key supporters. It eventually buckled under the pressure of increasing print costs, postage and bank charges, and announced its closure in late 1996.

In September 2008, Green and Tudor announced their intention to relaunch Critical Wave online, via eFanzines. The new version would return to their very earliest concept, a regular news-oriented "fanzine of record" covering British science fiction conventions, awards and publications. The first edition of the new series appeared on 14 November 2008. A major computer problem delayed the appearance of the second online issue, which was largely completed by late December 2008; as of October 2012, it remained unpublished.
