= Brett Harvey (English director) =

English director

- Occupations: Film writer; Director
- Years active: 2003–
- Notable work: Weekend Retreat (2011)

Brett Harvey is a film writer and director based in Cornwall. His debut feature film Weekend Retreat (2011), which premièred at the Cornwall Film Festival won several awards.

== Early life ==
Harvey grew up in Malabar, Truro He attended Richard Lander School and later studied film at St Helens College and Truro College. Harvey has two brothers: Simon Harvey and Dan Harvey. He later starred alongside them in the play Superstition Mountain. Simon founded Rough Cut, a regular film night organised by o-region in association with DOGBITE film crew, which Brett is currently the programmer and regular contributor to.

== Career ==
"I became a film-maker by mistake...I'd always loved films but never dreamed of making one myself. The first film was a joke, just something to do one night. We didn't have a script, we didn't even have a story, just some costumes and tomato ketchup. The resulting film, Zombies, was premiered at a house party to a room of 80 drunk college students. From that moment on I was a film-maker."

— Brett Harvey in Western Morning News (2010)

Harvey has created more than 30 short films. Harvey released a DVD in 2010, What I've done while I look for a real job which showed a collection of his short films. It featured 15 shorts between 60 seconds to 15 minutes long.

Harvey's first notable film The Curse (2003) was made for a Rough Cut film event and later won Best Amateur Film 2004 at Manchester Festival of Fantastic Films.

The 'o-region' production Weekend Retreat which was funded by 'Feast' was written and directed by Harvey. It was promoted as a "Cornish black comedy thriller" and was described in The Cornishman as "Pulp Fiction meets Shaun of the Dead without the zombies". It stars Esther Hall, Dominic Coleman and Dudley Sutton. Harvey won Best Director for the film at the London Independent Film Festival which was celebrated in Truro with two consecutive showings of Weekend Retreat. He has also won the Slate Golden Chough Award and awards at "Manchester Festival of Fantastic Films, Fresh Five, Viewfinder, Cornwall Film Festival, International Film Festival of Wales, Frightfest, Total Film magazine and was nominated for a BAFTA."

Harvey's film An Jowl Yn Agas Kegin (The Devil in Your Kitchen) was an English subtitled film with spoken Cornish.

Harvey is an associate lecturer of film at Falmouth University.

== Filmography ==
- The Curse (2003, produced for Rough Cut, Winner of 2004 Delta Film Award)
- Me and Alfie (2003, Cornwall film festival winner)
- Pop Chorus (2006, BAFTA runner-up in the 60 seconds of fame award 2007)
- An Jowl Yn Agas Kegin (The Devil in Your Kitchen) (2007)
- Flight of the falcons (2007)
- The Lovers (2008)
- Bandages (2008, Zone Horror CUT! Short Film Competition runner-up)
- Displacement (2009, Cornwall film festival)
- Superstition Mountain (2010)
- The Venus Flower (2011, film documenting a Global Gardens production)
- My Truro (2011, Short film)
- 12 Hours (2011, Cornwall College production)
- Weekend Retreat (2011, Winner of Best Writer Director at London Independent Film Festival, Best Director at the International Film Festival of Wales, and Best Feature Film at Edinburgh Bootleg Film Festival)
- Dementia Uncovered (2012)
- Paradise (2013, music video for Black Books)
- Dog (2013)
- Brown Willy (2016)
