= Martin Tudor (science fiction activist) =

Martin Tudor is an active British science fiction fan, editor or co-editor of several science fiction fanzines (Empties and the semi-professional Critical Wave), and a member of various convention committees, most notably Novacon (he has chaired more of these than anyone else). He ran the fan programme at the 1987 worldcon in Brighton. In addition, during the early 1990s, he freelanced as a book reviewer for the magazine publisher Pegasus.

Tudor was the 1996 TransAtlantic Fan Fund winner, having stood unsuccessfully in 1988. A collection of his articles for Empties and other fanzines, The Tudor Dynasty, was edited by Bernie Evans and published during the 1996 campaign; his TAFF trip across the United States was later chronicled in Have Bag, Will Travel, sections of which had actually been published in the UK whilst he was still in the US.

Following Tudor's return to the UK, both he and Dan Steffan (the North American TAFF administrator) were criticised by certain fans for not revealing during his tour that the previous UK administrator, Abi Frost, had diverted TAFF funds for her personal use and was unable to repay more than UK£2600. Tudor and Steffan defended their decision by stating they did not want the entire trip overshadowed by Frost's fraudulent actions. Despite promising to do so, Frost failed to repay the majority of the cash and disappeared from the social circles she had once been so active in (she died in 2009). Tudor and Steffan subsequently built the funds back up to the pre-fraud level, mostly with donations from British sf fans, and TAFF survived the scandal.

Critical Wave folded in 1996, after nine years of narrowly averting financial oblivion, but in September 2008, he and Green announced plans for an online relaunch of Critical Wave via eFanzines. A single issue appeared, but technical problems scuppered the second.

Other activities including administering the annual Nova Awards, a role he returned to in November 2009 but relinquished the following September.

Tudor lives in Walsall, England. His daughter Heloise (born 1997) coincidentally shares her birthday with Tudor's former Critical Wave partner Steve Green.
