= Jaine Fenn =

British science fiction author

- Writing career
- Genre: Science fiction
- Website: jainefenn.com

Jaine Fenn is a British science fiction author.

Fenn is the author of the Hidden Empire and Shadowlands series of novels. She studied linguistics and astronomy at the University of Hertfordshire, where she became the president of PSiFA (the local student Science Fiction society) from 1985-1986. She also helped organised Shoestringcons and edited their newsletter/fanzine, Hypo-Space, for a period.

== Career ==
Fenn has had numerous short stories published in various magazines and anthologies, and has won the BSFA Award for Shorter Fiction. Her debut novel, Principles of Angels was published in June 2008 (United Kingdom) and is the first of the Hidden Empire series. Her second novel, Consorts of Heaven, published in June 2009, mixed elements of fantasy with science fiction and was not a direct sequel. The third book, Guardians of Paradise (2010) brings together threads from the first two and the fourth and fifth, Bringer of Light (2011) and Queen of Nowhere (2013) take the story in a new direction. In 2012, Fenn published the short story collection Downside Girls. It features interlinked stories set in the universe of her Hidden Empire series.

Her science fantasy duology, Shadowlands, set on a divided world, starts with Hidden Sun (2018) and concludes with Broken Shadow (2019). She has also written for video-games in the Halo and Total War franchises.

Jaine Fenn has been guest of honour at

- ArmadaCon in November 2024
- Picocon 34 in February 2017
- Satellite 5 in May 2016
- BristolCon in September 2015
- Andromeda One in September 2013
- Novacon 42 in November 2012
- Picocon 27 in February 2009

== Works ==
- Downside Girls (short fiction collection, 2012)
- The Martian Job (novella, 2017)

Hidden Empire series

1. Principles of Angels (2008)
2. Consorts of Heaven (2009)
3. Guardians of Paradise (2010)
4. Bringer of Light (2011)
5. Queen of Nowhere (2013)

Shadowlands series

1. Hidden Sun (2018)
2. Broken Shadow (2019)
