= Festival of Fantastic Films =

- Location: Manchester, England
- Founded by: Tony Edwards, Harry Nadler
- Language: English
- Website: fantastic-films.uk

The Festival of Fantastic Films is an annual non-profit celebration of cinema fantastique, held annually in central Manchester, England.

It was created by Tony Edwards and the late Harry Nadler (both members of the Delta Film Group, an amateur filmmaking society active in the 1960s and both past organisers of an Eastercon), together with their fellow enthusiast Gil Lane-Young.

Past guests have included producer Tony Tenser; producer and director Roger Corman; directors Robert Fuest, Norman J. Warren, Val Guest, Robin Hardy, Jorge Grau; actors Andrew Keir, Robin Askwith, David Warbeck, Ken Foree, David Hess, Norman Rossington; actresses Caroline Munro, Barbara Shelley, Anne Robinson, Catriona MacColl, Ingrid Pitt.

Two prizes are presented each year: for the best amateur film screened (see entry for the Delta Film Award) and the best independent entry.

The 19th Festival of Fantastic Films was held on 17–19 October 2008 with Jess Conrad and Lamberto Bava among the guests appearing.

The 20th Festival was held on the 16–18 October 2009 with Emily Booth, John Carson, Jenny Hanley, John Hough, Ian McCulloch, Derren Nesbitt and Peter Sasdy appearing. The winner of the best Independent Feature film at the 20th International Festival was Kirk, a community project film by the Strathendrick Film Society, directed by Michael Ferns and produced by Joan Macpherson.
