= Simon Harvey =

Simon Harvey is a British actor, freelance director and producer based in Truro, Cornwall. He was resident Associate Director for Kneehigh Theatre and Artistic Director of o-region, a theatre and film production company. He has produced and directed the original shows Laughing Gas by (Nick Darke and Carl Grose) and One Darke Night. He also produced and performed in Superstition Mountain by Carl Grose.

Harvey attended Richard Lander School in Truro and graduated from Dartington College of Arts now Falmouth University in 1997 where he also now teaches.

His work in film includes producing two feature-length films The Rabbit and The Midnight Drives (2007) by writer/director Mark Jenkin and more recently co-producing the feature film Weekend Retreat by Brett Harvey which premièred at the Cornwall Film Festival and won several awards. His work for Kneehigh Theatre includes:

- Steptoe and Son (National Tour 2012)
- Midnight's Pumpkin/The Wild Bride (2011)
- The Red Shoes (National/International tour)
- Hansel and Gretel
- Brief Encounter (UK/American Tour)
- Rapunzel
- Cymbeline

Harvey has performed in a number of Kneehigh shows including Blast, The King of Prussia (2010), Wagstaffe the Wind Up Boy and the Kneehigh Rambles (2012).

Harvey co-produced and acted in the film Brown Willy which was directed by his brother Brett. The film was shot on location at Brown Willy on Bodmin Moor, the highest point in Cornwall.

Harvey adapted and directed Kneehigh's Fup in 2016, which starred Cornish actor Calvin Dean, based on a novel by Jim Dodge; it received a 4 star rating from The Times and was performed at the Lost Gardens of Heligan in Cornwall in 2016.

Harvey directed the Christmas show for Hall for Cornwall in 2015, 2016 and 2017. And continues to engage in projects with them.
