= Donald E. Ford =

American science fiction fan (1921–1965)

Don Ford (1921–1965) was an influential American science fiction fan from Ohio.

== Career ==
Don began reading science fiction in 1930, and his lifelong love of the genre led him into fandom, where he made many notable contributions to fan writing, fanzine editing and convention-running. He possessed a notably large SF magazine collection. He was a leading member of the Cincinnati Fantasy Group (CFG) and a founder member of First Fandom. He attended the 1948 Worldcon in Toronto, and in 1949, he chaired Cinvention, the seventh Worldcon in Cincinnati. In 1950, he founded and chaired the first Midwestcon. Well connected to fans in both UK and the US, he worked with Walt Willis to develop TAFF and he was the first TAFF US administrator. He won the 1959 TAFF race, attending the 1960 Eastercon in London.

== Personal life ==
He died unexpectedly on 2 April 1965 at the age of 44 from cancer.
