= John-Henri Holmberg =

Swedish writer

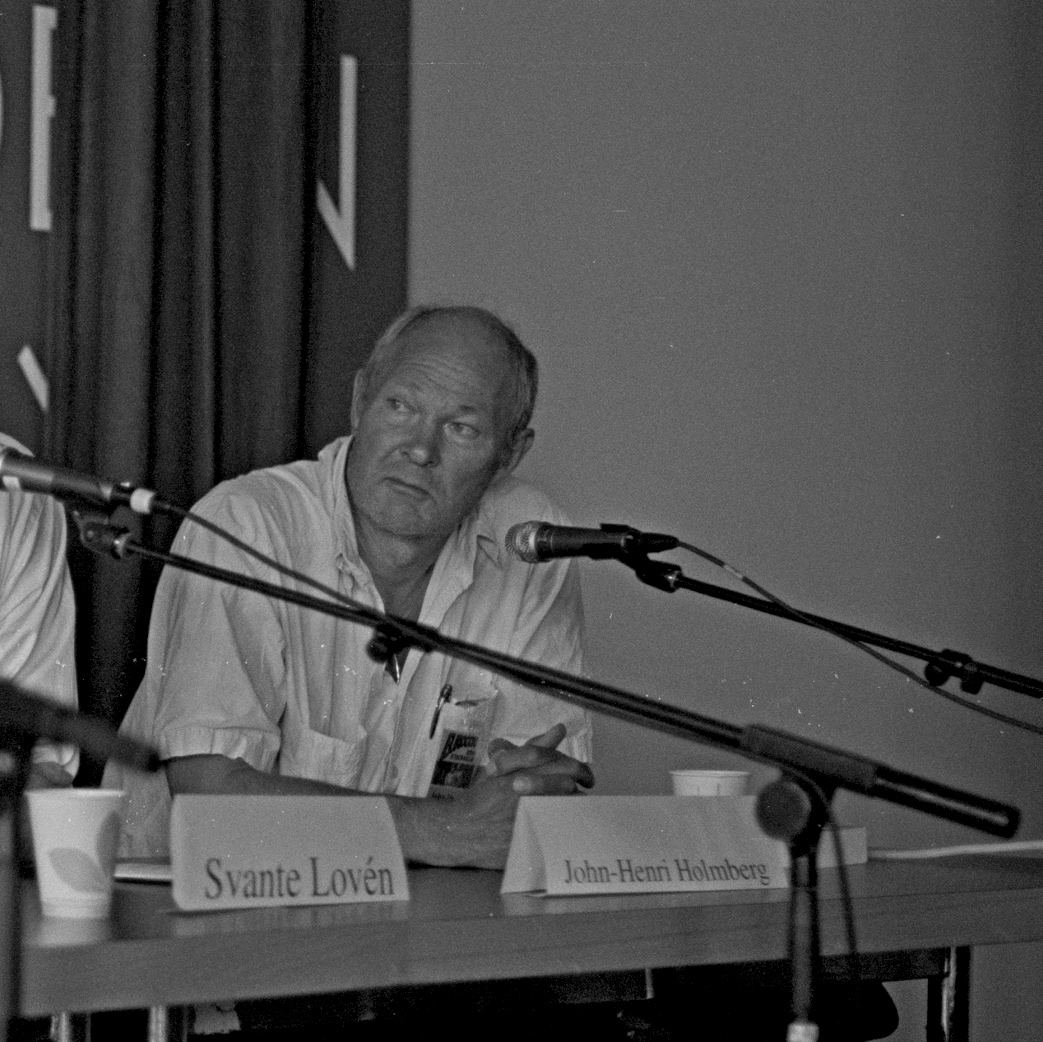
John-Henri Holmberg at Eurocon in Stockholm 2011.

John-Henri Bertilson Holmberg (born 22 June 1949 in Stockholm) is a Swedish author, critic, publisher and translator, and a well-known science fiction fan. In the early 1960s he edited Science fiction Forum with Bertil Mårtensson and Mats Linder and published over 200 science fiction fanzines of his own, in addition to his professional career as editor and critic. One of the fans with whom he worked was fellow Swede Stieg Larsson.

As editor and later publisher at Askild & Kärnekull, Lindfors, Bokförlaget Bra Böcker/Wiken and later with his own publishing house Replik he has introduced many current authors into Sweden, including several science fiction authors. A leading libertarian, he introduced Ayn Rand into Swedish debate in the 1970s and later saw to the publication in Swedish of her main literary works.

He is a contributor to The Encyclopedia of Science Fiction and to The Encyclopedia of Fantasy, edited by John Clute and Peter Nicholls; and has written three major literary overviews in Swedish, a two-volume work about science fiction and one-volume works on psychological suspense fiction and on fantasy. As a translator, he has rendered Lemony Snicket's and many of Stephen King's novels into Swedish. He is a member of the Swedish Crime Fiction Academy and between 2004 and 2009 edited and published the quarterly, resurrected Nova science fiction (which in its earlier incarnation he also edited from 1982 to 1987), the largest Scandinavian science fiction magazine.

Holmberg is a frequent guest on Swedish television and radio for discussions about science fiction and other literature; in 2010, this has often included discussions of his relationship with fellow SF fan Stieg Larsson and the question of whether Larsson left behind fourth or even fifth novels in his series. In 2011, he published a book in collaboration with Dan Bursteing and Arne De Keijzer, titled The Tattooed Girl: The Enigma of Stieg Larsson and the Secrets Behind the Most Compelling Thrillers of Our Time. Rights to the book were presold in a number of languages. In 2012, the book was nominated for the Edgar Award in the Best Critical/Biographical category.

He lives in Viken, Sweden in the south of Sweden.

In August 2015 it was announced that he would be one of the Guests of Honor of the 75th World Science Fiction Convention, to be held in Helsinki, Finland.

== Works ==
- Drömmar om evigheten, Askild & Kärnekull 1974.
- Befria människan, Dalia Books 1985.
- Fantasy, fantasylitteraturens historia, motiv och författare, Replik 1995.
- Dunkla drifter och mörka motiv - den psykologiska thrillern. Bibliotekstjänst 1997.
- Inre landskap och yttre rymd, del 1 – science fictions historia från H. G. Wells till Brian Aldiss. Bibliotekstjänst 2002.
- Inre landskap och yttre rymd, del 2 – science fictions historia från J. G. Ballard till Gene Wolfe. Bibliotekstjänst 2003.
- Filmtema. Bibliotekstjänst 2006.
- Secrets of the Girl with the Dragon Tattoo, with Dan Burstein and Arne de Keijzer, St. Martin's Griffin 2011.
- Häpna! En bok ur och om 1950-talets tongivande science fiction-tidskrift, Heidi 2015.
- Credited as author in Nationalencyklopedin of the following articles: "Cyberpunk," "Fantasy:litteratur," "Skräcklitteratur," "J. R. R. Tolkien," "Undergroundlitteratur," & "Science fiction."
