= Bertil Mårtensson =

Swedish author (1945–2018)

Bertil Mårtensson (June 12 1945 in Malmö – November 4, 2018 in Helsingborg) was a Swedish author of science fiction, crime fiction and fantasy and also an academic philosopher. He was assistant professor at Umeå University, where he was also chair of the department from 1988–93, and at Lund University.

== Biography ==
Since his youth, Mårtensson wrote mainly science fiction short stories and novels, and a lengthy fantasy work in three volumes published in 1979–83 and in a revised edition in 1997.

His work has in style and themes been compared by Swedish critics to those of Clifford D. Simak, Theodore Sturgeon, Arabian Nights and J. R. R. Tolkien. The Scandinavian flavour has also been emphasized. He wrote fiction with the Scandinavian type of troll, as in Ibsen & Grieg's Peer Gynt and "In the Hall of the Mountain King", or the trolls of John Bauer.

He began his career as a highly active science fiction fan, co-editing Science Fiction Forum with John-Henri Holmberg and Mats Linder in the 1960s, and later by himself in the 1990s. He also contributed many short stories and articles to Swedish science fiction fanzines, and was Guest of Honor at several national science fiction conventions.

His first novel, Detta är verkligheten ("This is reality"), was awarded at the Paneuropean convention in Trieste in 1972, and has been translated into Danish and Czech. He also published a series of science fiction, science fantasy and fantasy novels, and published science fiction stories in English, German, French, Danish, Spanish, and Italian. Mårtensson also wrote four police procedural crime novels in the late 1970s, the second of which was awarded the Sherlock Award for best Swedish crime novel of 1977.

As a philosopher, he published a textbook of formal logic and an introduction to the philosophy of science. His main interests were cognition, concept-formation, and the growth of knowledge. He was Associate Professor emeritus at Lund University.

After his retirement he continued to write and published essays about science fiction and some short stories.

== Books ==
- Detta är verkligheten, ("This is Reality") Bonniers Sept 1968.
- Skeppet i Kambrium, ("The Ship in Cambrium") AoK 1974.
- Samarkand 5617, Bokád 1975.
- Adolf och javamännens gåta, ("Adolf and the Mystery of the Men of Java") Bokád 1976.
- Mah-jongmorden, ("The Mah-jong Murders") Bokad 1976.
- Jungfrulig Planet, ("Virgin Planet") Bokád 1977.
- Växande hot, ("Growing Threat") Bokad 1977 (Sherlock-award 1977).
- Mordet på dr Faust, ("The Murder of Dr. Faust") Bokád 1978.
- Sadisterna, ("The Sadists") Bokád 1979.
- Deral Bågskytt, ("Deral Bowman") SFSF 1979.
- Vakthundarna, ("The Watchdogs") (poetry), SFSF 1979.
- Vilse, ("Lost") (short stories, with Steve Sem-Sandberg), SFSF 1979.
- Maktens Vägar: Vägen Bort, ("The Ways of Power: The Way Beyond") Bokád 1979. Revised 1997, Replik.
- Maktens Vägar: Vägen tillbaka, ("The Ways of Power: The Way Back") Bokád 1980. Revised 1997, Replik.
- Maktens Vägar: Vägen ut, ("The Ways of Power: The Way Out") Anmans 1983. Revised 1997, Replik.
- Kontrakt med döden, ("Contract with Death") Settern 1985.
- Förvandlas, ("Transforming") (short stories), Ellerströms 1986.
- Det gyllene språnget, ("The Golden Leap") Nyströms 1987.
- Vingmästarens dotter, ("The Wingmaster's Daughter") Wiken, 1992.

== Electronic publications (in Swedish) ==
- Maktens Vägar (the complete fantasy trilogy, in Swedish) published through http://www.elib.se
- Samarkand 5617 (read in Swedish by Cecilia Wetterström) Wela Förlag, mp3-book, http://www.elib.se
- Växande Hot (Crime/police novel, also in Swedish) published through http://www.elib.se

== Publications in English ==
- A Modest Proposal (Hilary Bailey & Charles Platt (eds): New Worlds 7, Sphere Books 1974)
- In orbit, poem, Riverside Quarterly vol 2 no 2 June 1966)
- Myxomatosis Forte (in Brian Aldiss and Sam J. Lundwall (eds): The Penguin World Omnibus of Science Fiction, Penguin Books 1986.)
- The Fifth Time Out (in Richard D. Nolane (ed): Terra SF, The Year's Best European SF, Daw Books 1981.)

== Some non-English publications ==
- Verdener Uden Graense (Danish tr. by Jannick Storm), Hasselbalchs May 1968. (The first novel)
- a story in Italian magazine "Verso le stelle" n.1, 1978
- Světy bez hranic, tr. Ivo Zelezny, Albatros Praha 1982 (2 printings) (The first novel)
- Androiden denken nicht (Herbert W. Franke (ed): Kontinuum 2, Ullstein Buch April 1986)
- Danse de mort (Antares 24)
- Il vecchio e la tempesta (I Romanzi del Cosmo Fantascienza, N. 195, Settem 1966.)
- L'arche des ombres (Antares 26)
- La mort du Grangorn le Terrible (Antares 3)
- La Tempête (Fiction No 296, Décembre 1978)
- Le Cinquième Voyage (Fiction No. 303, Juillet-août 1979)
- Les androides ne pensent pas (Antares 11)
- Les cathédrales volantes (Nouvelles du Nord Numero 8, also in Antares vol 6
- Otázka (Světová literatura 1981 1)
- Rock 'n Roll et Martiens (Antares 16)
