= Roy Kettle =

Leroy Richard Arthur "Roy" Kettle OBE (born 1949) is a retired United Kingdom civil servant who, among many other achievements, was one of the principal architects of the Disability Discrimination Act 1995.

With Greg Pickersgill, he was a leading light of "Ratfandom" in London in the 1970s. He produced two science fiction fanzines, Fouler (with Pickersgill) and True Rat, both noted for their acid humour. He also participated in the oneshot fanzine An Egregious Guide To The Conventions with Pickersgill.

Kettle has authored and co-authored a number of books in the science fiction, horror, and humour genres.

He married Kathleen in 1985, with whom he has two children, Jennifer and Nathan, and lives in Hitchin, Hertfordshire.

== Publications ==
- Slimer (co-authored with John Brosnan under the name "Harry Adam Knight"), Star Books (paperback) 1983, ISBN 0-352-31366-8
- The Fungus (co-authored with John Brosnan under the name "Simon Ian Childer"), Star Books (paperback) 1985, ISBN 0-352-31546-6
- Tendrils (co-authored with John Brosnan Grafton (paperback) 1986, ISBN 0-586-06437-0
- Bedlam (co-authored with John Brosnan under the name "Harry Adam Knight"), Gollancz (hardback) 1992, ISBN 0-575-04995-2; (paperback) 1993, ISBN 0-575-05347-X
- The Dirty Movie Book (co-authored with John Brosnan under the name "Leroy Mitchell"), Grafton Books (paperback) 1988, ISBN 0-586-06944-5
- Future Perfect (co-authored with Christopher Evans) Pitchblende Books (paperback) 2014, ISBN 9780992879006
- True Rat: The Beast of Leroy Kettle Ansible Editions (ebook) 2018, ISBN 9781913451394 (paperback) 2022, ISBN 9781471635489

== Awards and honours ==
- Fan Guest of Honour: Skycon (Eastercon, 1978)
- Best Fan Writer Hugo nominee: Seacon '79 (Worldcon, 1979)
- Order of the British Empire, OBE (Queen's Honours List, 2006)
