= The Book of Birmingham =

2018 anthology of stories about Shanghai

The Book of Birmingham is an anthology of nine stories from various English writers, edited by Khavita Bhanot and published on 15 November 2018. It is the ninth book of the Reading the City series, focused on stories from and about a certain city, in this case Birmingham in England.

== Content ==
- Introduction by Kavita Bhanot
- Exterior Paint by Kit de Waal
- Seep by Sharon Duggal
- Amir Aziz by Bobby Nayyar
- Taking Doreen Out of the Sky by Alan Beard
- 1985 by Balvinder Banga
- Kindling by Jendella Benson
- Blind Circles by Joel Lane
- A Game of Chess by Malachi McIntosh
- The Call by Sibyl Ruth
- About the contributions

== Review ==
Anglozine wrote the book is a "stellar portrayal of one of the UK's finest cities known for the radical transformation it has undergone during the previous decades." Outside Left wrote about Seep, that it was "it was beautiful and stunning and intimate and beyond it foretold of the thrills and spills ahead".
