= Lindfors =

Lindfors is a Swedish surname. Notable people with the surname include:

- Adolf Lindfors (1879–1959), Finnish wrestler and Olympic champion in Greco-Roman wrestling
- Anton Lindfors (born 1991), Finnish-Swedish snowboarder
- Arthur Lindfors (1893–1977), Finnish wrestler and Olympic medalist in Greco-Roman wrestling
- Berndt Lindfors (1932–2009), Finnish Olympic gymnast
- Caisa-Marie Lindfors (born 2000), Swedish discus thrower
- Jarl Lindfors, Honorary Consul of Finland in the United States (1936–1960)
- Jenny Lindfors, Irish-Swedish singer-songwriter, vocalist, musician and composer
- Jonny Lindfors (born 1975), Swedish Army officer
- Lill Lindfors (born 1940), Finnish-Swedish jazz singer
- Mats Lindfors of Talisman, a Swedish hard rock band
- Mattias Lindfors (born 1989), Finnish sailor
- Monica Lindfors (born 2000), Finnish figure skater
- Sakari Lindfors (born 1966), professional ice hockey player
- Staffan Lindfors (born 1968), Swedish musician, songwriter and producer
- Stefan Lindfors (born 1962), Finnish industrial designer, interior designer, film-maker and sculptor
- Viveca Lindfors (1920–1995), Swedish/American stage and film actress
- Viveca Lindfors (figure skater) (born 1999), Finnish figure skater
