= EFanzines =

The single largest online distribution point for science-fiction fanzines, eFanzines, was launched by Bill Burns on 7 December 2000 and recorded its 500,000th visit in December 2008. It was a Hugo Award finalist for "best web site" in 2005, one of only two occasions that category has appeared on the ballot. It has been a central part of opening up the science fiction fanzine world, which used to be difficult to find for those who were not already part of it.

Hundreds of British and American fanzines are now available to read or download for free, including Mike Glyer's long-running sf newsletter File 770 (six-time Hugo winner), Peter Weston's Nova-winning Prolapse (recently retitled Relapse), Bruce Gillespie's Hugo-nominated and Ditmar-winning critical journal SF Commentary and editions of the digital amateur press association e-APA.

As well as an extensive gallery of British science fiction convention badges and other British fan historical pages, the site also includes links to dozens of related archives and other online fanzines.
