= Dan Steffan =

American cartoonist and writer

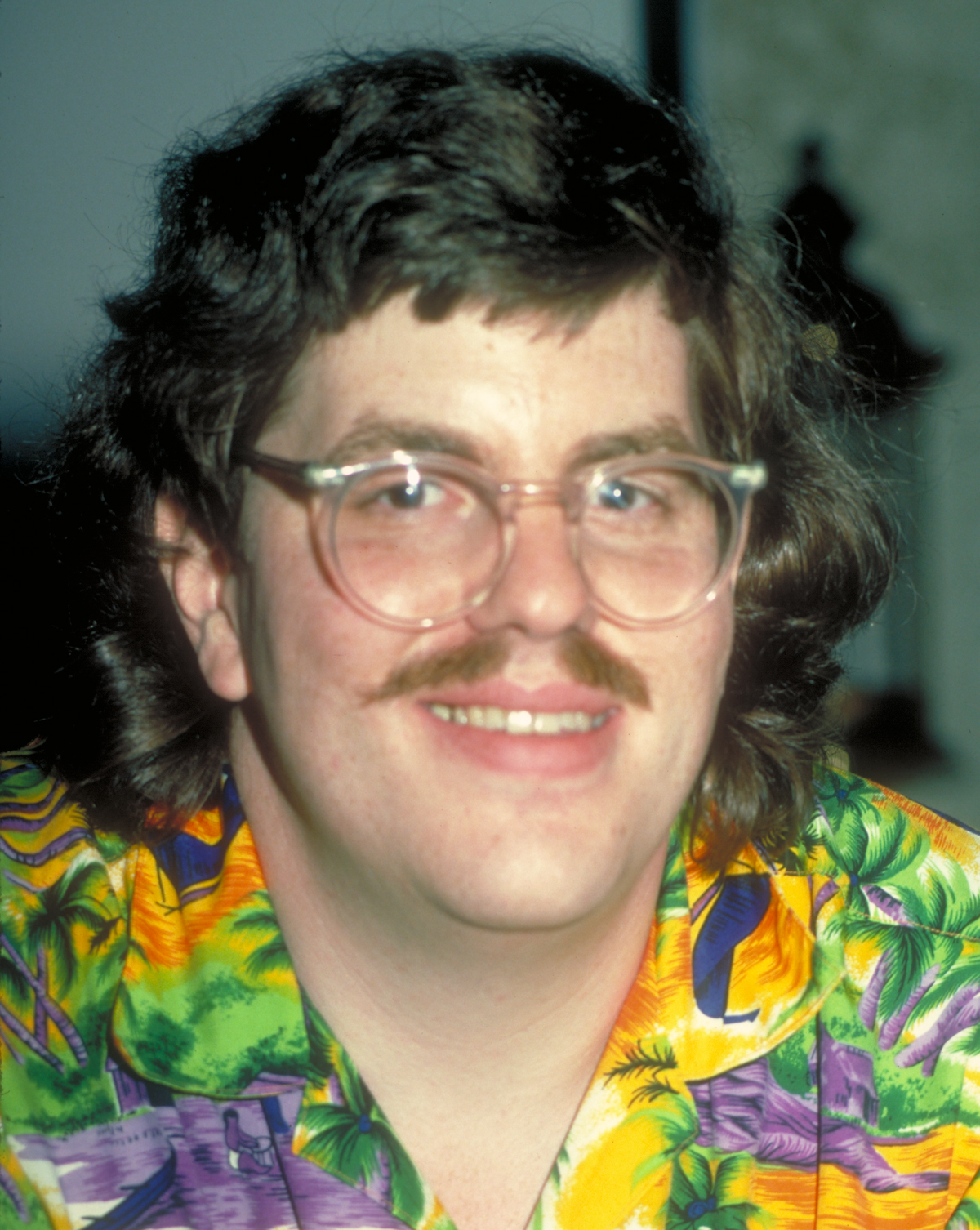
Dan Steffan in the 1980s.

Dan Steffan is an American cartoonist and writer who has contributed to both mainstream and underground publications for several decades.

== Biography ==
During the 1970s, Steffan drew for such underground titles as Bizarre Sex and Grateful Dead Comix, both published by Kitchen Sink Press.

In the early 1980s, his cartoons and comic strips appeared frequently in Heavy Metal. He co-founded the science fiction magazine Eye in 1986, and he contributed extensively to science fiction fanzines. In 1982, Steffan and Ted White teamed to launch the fanzine Pong.

His work for DC Comics during the 1990s includes inks on Animal Man #64 and cartoon art for licensed products associated with Batman: The Animated Series.

His artwork was reprinted in Kitchen Sink Press: The First 25 Years by Dave Schreiner (Kitchen Sink Press, 1994). Schreiner and co-editor Philip Amara also included art by Steffan in All-American Hippie Comix (Kitchen Sink Press, 1995) along with work by Jim Valentino and Reed Waller.

In 2008, he completed his research on the artist Ronald Clyne, and his survey of Clyne's life and career was published in Earl Kemp's ezine, e.I (December 2008). Other ezines, such as Chunga, have published cartoon illustrations by Steffan.

Steffan lived for many years in Arlington, Virginia and currently resides in Portland, Oregon.

== Awards ==
In 1994, Steffan won two FAAn Awards for Best Fan Artist and Best Fanzine, Blat!, which he co-edited with Ted White. Receiving the most votes in the 1995 TransAtlantic Fan Fund competition, Steffan won a trip to the UK, and he wrote detailed humorous reports of his travels.

He also received the 2009 Rotsler Award in recognition of his contributions to fan art.
