= Ken Slater (science fiction) =

Ken Slater (1917–2008) was a British science fiction fan and bookseller. In 1947, while serving in the British Army of the Rhine, he started Operation Fantast, a network of science fiction fans which had 800 members around the world by 1950 though it folded a few years later. Through Operation Fantast, he was the major importer of American science fiction books and magazines into Britain - an activity which he continued, after its collapse, through his company Fantast (Medway) up to the time of his death. He was a founder member of the British Science Fiction Association in 1958.

== Awards and honours ==
He was Guest of Honour at Brumcon, the 1959 Eastercon and at Conspiracy '87, the 1987 Worldcon, jointly with his wife Joyce. He received the Doc Weir Award in 1966 and the Big Heart Award in 1995. At the first Hugo Award ceremony in Philadelphia in 1953, Forrest J Ackerman won the trophy for #1 Fan Personality, but said that the award should have gone to Slater.
