= David A. Hardy =

British space artist

- Born: 10 April 1936 (age 90); Bournville, UK
- Occupation: Artist
- Known for: Space art

David A. Hardy (born 10 April 1936) is a British space artist.

== Early life ==
David Hardy was born 10 April 1936 in Bournville, UK. He studied at the Margaret Street College of Art in Birmingham, and was soon painting for the British Interplanetary Society.

== Career ==
He started his career as an employee in the Design Office of Cadbury's, where he created packaging and advertising art for the company's confectionery; but was already illustrating books for e.g. Patrick Moore.

His first science fiction art was published in 1970, but he has gone on to illustrate hundreds of covers for books, and for magazines such as The Magazine of Fantasy and Science Fiction and Analog Science Fiction and Science Fact. His work also appears regularly in magazines such as Astronomy, Sky & Telescope, Astronomy Now and Popular Astronomy, for which he also writes articles.

Jon Gustafson and Peter Nicholls write that he is "known as much for his astronomical paintings in the accurate tradition of Chesley Bonestell as for his sf work... Some of his best early work was to illustrate a nonfiction book by Patrick Moore, Suns, Myths, and Men (1954)." Gustafson and Nicholls remark that The Magazine of Fantasy and Science Fiction was "the magazine for which he developed his famous "Space Gumby 'Bhen'," a green alien which lent humour to his vivid astronomical scenes. He was an important artist for Vision of Tomorrow and worked also for Science Fiction Monthly, If and Galaxy."

He is European Vice President of the International Association of Astronomical Artists, and a former Vice President of the Association of Science Fiction and Fantasy Artists.

He has been Artist Guest of Honour at a number of science fiction conventions, including Stucon, Albacon, ArmadaCon, Novacon, the 2007 Eurocon, and Illustrious, the 2011 Eastercon. He was also a guest speaker at the 2012 Microcon at Exeter University.

== Major books ==
- Challenge of the Stars (with Patrick Moore) (1972), revised as New Challenge of the Stars 1978
- Galactic Tours (with Bob Shaw) (1981)
- Atlas of the Solar System (1982/1986)
- Visions of Space (Dragon's World, 1989)
- Hardyware: The Art of David A. Hardy (text by Chris Morgan]; Paper Tiger UK/Sterling US 2001)
- Aurora: A Child of Two Worlds (novel; Cosmos Books, 2003), (Updated and revised edition, August 2012; Wildside Press)
- Futures: 50 Years in Space (text by Sir Patrick Moore, AAPPL/HarperCollins 2004), (Paperback 50 Years in Space AAPPL 2006)

== Awards and honours ==
- 1979: Nominated for the Hugo Award for Best Professional Artist.
- 1987: Won 'Best European SF Artist' award.
- 2001: Won the Lucien Rudaux Memorial Award.
- 2003: Asteroid 13329 Davidhardy, discovered in 1998 by Spacewatch at Kitt Peak, has been named after him.
- 2003, 2004, 2005, 2007: Awarded best cover art, readers award, by Analog Science Fiction and Science Fact.
- 2005: Futures was nominated for the Hugo Award for Best Related Book, and won the Sir Arthur Clarke Award for 'Best Written Presentation'.
- 2015: Received the Ordway Award for 'sustained excellence in spaceflight history'.
- 2019: Elected an Honorary Fellow of the British Interplanetary Society.
