= Eastercon =

Annual speculative fiction convention in the UK

- Genre: Science fiction
- Venue: varies
- Location: varies
- Country: United Kingdom
- Inaugurated: 1948
- Attendance: ~800
- Website: http://www.eastercon.org/

Eastercon is the common name for the annual British national science fiction convention. The convention is organised by voluntary self-organising committees, rather than a permanent entity.

== Overview ==
Eastercon attracts 800-1200 fans of science fiction, fantasy and similar genres. Programme events usually include panels, workshops, talks, quizzes, competitions, an art show, and a Dealers room selling books and other items. Events range from hard science through writing workshops to the fun and silly. People are encouraged to take part.

== History ==
The very first British science-fiction convention was held in Leeds on 3 January 1937. Similar events were held in London on 10 April 1938 and 21 May 1939, Leicester as "Midvention" over the Easter bank holiday weekend of 23–26 April 1943, and in London over the Easter weekend of 8–9 April 1944.

Eastercon sees its first official convention as being held in 1948 in London. It was held over the three-day Whitsun bank holiday at the end of May with an attendance of 50 people. The conventions were held annually over Whitsun until the 1960s, when the decision was made to move the event to the four-day Easter holiday.

The pre-1960s conventions are generally considered to have been "Eastercons" even though they were not held over Easter.

== Organisation ==
=== Finances ===
Eastercons are fan-run/not-for-profit events, with the money raised by membership, advertising, etc., spent on running the convention. It is traditional that any surplus is used for the benefit of the convention members, fandom in general or donated to charity. This may include sponsoring items at other conventions, buying equipment for use by other conventions, donating to the RNIB to get works of SF literature converted to talking books for the blind, donating to the Science Fiction Foundation to fund a variety of educational projects relating to science fiction, and funding international fan visits (often through The League of Fan Funds).

=== Two-year bidding ===
Groups of fans (typically 5-8 in number) get together to form "bid committees" and plan where they want to hold the Eastercon, who they want to be their guests of honour, what the theme of the convention will be, etc. They circulate their proposals and the winning bid is chosen by a vote among the people who attend the bid session at the Eastercon two years in advance, or one year if no bid was successful at the bid session two years out. Until the early 1990s, there were commonly several bids to hold the Eastercon, but organising this event involves a lot of resources, and now it is normal for there to be only one serious bid - Reclamation in 2022 saw the first contested bid (for 2023) in some 30 years.

== Eastercon traditions ==
The Doc Weir award is voted on and presented each year at Eastercon to an "unsung hero" of British fandom.

The BSFA Awards are presented every year by the British Science Fiction Association, for work published in the previous calendar year. These are voted on by BSFA and Eastercon members.

The George Hay Memorial Lecture, a presentation on a scientific topic by an invited speaker, has been held every Eastercon since 2Kon in 2000. The lecturer and subject are selected and paid for by the Science Fiction Foundation who offer this programme item to each year's Eastercon. Since 2009 the British Science Fiction Association has presented a similar lecture, drawing speakers from the arts and humanities.

== Trademark ==
In 2003 at Seacon, a fan offered to obtain the UK trademark for "Eastercon" on behalf of UK fandom and this was agreed by that year's convention. This trademark was subsequently obtained, meaning that any group that now wants to use the "Eastercon" name must obtain permission from the trademark holder first.

== List of Eastercons ==
	Year	Location	Name	Guest(s) of Honour	Size	Web
1	1948	London	Whitcon	Bertram Chandler	?	
2	1949	London	Loncon	William F. Temple	?	
3	1952	London	London SF Con		?	
4	1953	London	Coroncon		?	
5	1954	Manchester	Supermancon	John Russell Fearn	?	
6	1955	Kettering	Cytricon		?	
7	1956	Kettering	Cytricon II		?	
8	1957	Kettering	Cytricon III		?	
9	1958	Kettering	Cytricon IV		?	
10	1959	Birmingham	Brumcon	Ken Slater	?	
11	1960	London	London	E.J. "Ted" Carnell, Don Ford	?	
12	1961	Gloucester	LXIcon	Kingsley Amis	?	
13	1962	Harrogate	Ronvention	Tom Boardman	?	
14	1963	Peterborough	Bullcon	Edmund Crispin	?	
15	1964	Peterborough	RePetercon	Ted Tubb	151	
16	1965	Birmingham	Brumcon II	Harry Harrison	?	
17	1966	Yarmouth	Yarcon	Ron Whiting	?	
18	1967	Bristol	Briscon	John Brunner	?	
19	1968	Buxton	Thirdmancon	Kenneth Bulmer	?	
20	1969	Oxford	Galactic Fair 1969	Judith Merril	?	
21	1970	London	SCI-CON 70	James Blish	?	
22	1971	Worcester	Eastercon 22	Ethel Lindsay, Anne McCaffrey	?	
23	1972	Chester	Chessmancon	Larry Niven	?	
24	1973	Bristol	OMPAcon '73	Samuel R. Delany	?	
25	1974	Newcastle	Tynecon	Bob Shaw, Peter Weston	c415	
26	1975	Coventry	Seacon	Harry Harrison	c.550	
27	1976	Manchester	Mancon 5	Peter Roberts, Robert Silverberg	?	
28	1977	Coventry	Eastercon '77	John Bush	?	
29	1978	Heathrow, London	Skycon	Roy Kettle, Robert Sheckley	?	
30	1979	Leeds	Yorcon	Graham and Pat Charnock, Richard Cowper	?	
31	1980	Glasgow	Albacon	Jim Barker, Colin Kapp	?	
32	1981	Leeds	Yorcon II	Tom Disch, Dave Langford, Ian Watson	?	
33	1982	Brighton	Channelcon	Angela Carter, John Sladek	815	
34	1983	Glasgow	Albacon II	Marion Zimmer Bradley, Avedon Carol, James White	?	
35	1984	Brighton	Seacon '84	Pierre Barbet, Waldemar Kumming, Josef Nesvadba, Chris Priest, Roger Zelazny	?	
36	1985	Leeds	Yorcon III	Gregory Benford, Linda Pickersgill	?	
37	1986	Glasgow	Albacon III	Joe Haldeman, John Jarrold	?	
38	1987	NEC, Solihull	BECCON87	Chris Atkinson, Jane Gaskell, Keith Roberts	c.800	
39	1988	Liverpool	Follycon	Gordon Dickson, Gwyneth Jones, Greg Pickersgill, Len Wein	?	
40	1989	Jersey	Contrivance	Avedon Carol, Rob Hansen, M. John Harrison, Don Lawrence, Anne McCaffrey	?	
41	1990	Liverpool	Eastcon	Iain Banks, Anne Page, SMS	1100	
42	1991	Glasgow	Speculation	Robert Holdstock	?	
43	1992	Blackpool	Illumination	Geoff Ryman, Paul J. McAuley, Pam Wells	?	
44	1993	Jersey	Helicon	John Brunner, George R. R. Martin, Karel Thole, Larry van der Putte	?	
45	1994	Liverpool	Sou'Wester	Diane Duane, Neil Gaiman, Barbara Hambly, Peter Morwood	?	
46	1995	London	Confabulation	Lois McMaster Bujold, Roger Robinson, Bob Shaw	?	
47	1996	Heathrow, London	Evolution	Jack Cohen, Colin Greenland, Paul Kincaid, Bryan Talbot, Maureen Kincaid Speller, Vernor Vinge	?	
48	1997	Liverpool	Intervention	Brian Aldiss, Octavia Butler, David Langford, Jon Bing	?	
49	1998	Manchester	Intuition	Ian McDonald, Martin Tudor, Connie Willis	?	
50	1999	Liverpool	Reconvene	Peter S. Beagle, John Clute, Jeff Noon	?	
51	2000	Glasgow	2Kon	Guy Gavriel Kay, Katherine Kurtz, Deborah Turner-Harris	?	
52	2001	Hinckley	Paragon	Stephen Baxter, Claire Brialey, Lisanne Norman, Mark Plummer, Michael Scott Rohan	?	
53	2002	Jersey	Helicon 2	Brian Stableford, Harry Turtledove, Peter Weston	?	
54	2003	Hinckley	Seacon03	Chris Baker (Fangorn), Christopher Evans (author), Mary Gentle	?	
55	2004	Blackpool	Concourse	Mitchell Burnside Clapp, Danny Flynn, Sue Mason, Christopher Priest, Philip Pullman	?	
56	2005	Hinckley	Paragon 2	John Harvey, Eve Harvey, Ken MacLeod, Robert Rankin, Ben Jeapes, Richard Morgan	estimate 700-750	
57	2006	Glasgow	Concussion	M. John Harrison, Brian Froud, Elizabeth Hand, Justina Robson, Ian Sorensen	?	
58	2007	Chester	Contemplation		c.450	
59	2008	Heathrow, London	Orbital 2008	Neil Gaiman, Tanith Lee, China Miéville, Charles Stross, Rog Peyton	1300+	
60	2009	Bradford	LX	Jon Courtenay Grimwood, Tim Powers, David Lloyd, Bill Burns, Mary Burns	850	
61	2010	Heathrow, London	Odyssey 2010	Alastair Reynolds, Iain M Banks, Liz Williams, Mike Carey, Fran Dowd, John Dowd	1300+	
62	2011	NEC, Solihull	Illustrious	David Weber, Peter F. Hamilton, David A. Hardy, Vince Docherty, Roz Kaveney	956/877	
63	2012	Heathrow, London	Olympus 2012	Paul Cornell, Cory Doctorow, George R.R. Martin, Tricia Sullivan, Margaret Austin, Martin Easterbrook	1400	
64	2013	Bradford	EightSquaredCon	Walter Jon Williams, Freda Warrington, Anne Sudworth and Edward James	800	
65	2014	Glasgow	Satellite 4	John Meaney, Juliet McKenna, Jim Burns, and Alice and Steve Lawson, Dame Jocelyn Bell Burnell, Terry Pratchett	777	
66	2015	Heathrow, London	Dysprosium	Jim Butcher, Seanan McGuire, Caroline Mullan, Herr Döktor	1185	
67	2016	Manchester	Mancunicon	Aliette de Bodard, Dave Clements, Ian McDonald, Sarah Pinborough	?	
68	2017	NEC, Solihull	Eastercon 2017/Innominate	Pat Cadigan, Judith Clute, Colin Harris	?	
69	2018	Harrogate	Follycon	Kieron Gillen, Kim Stanley Robinson, Nnedi Okorafor, Christina Lake	949	
70	2019	Heathrow, London	Ytterbium	John Scalzi, Frances Hardinge, Sydney Padua, DC	1119	
71	2020	(online)	Concentric	convention cancelled except for bid session	846*	
72	2021	(online)	Confusion	Dan Abnett, Nik Vincent, Dave Lally	466	
73	2022	Heathrow, London	Reclamation	Zen Cho (cancelled), Mary Robinette Kowal, Philip Reeve, Tasha Suri, Nicholas Whyte	797*	
74	2023	Birmingham	Conversation	Zen Cho, Niall Harrison, Jennell Jaquays, Kari Sperring, Adrian Tchaikovsky, Ursula Vernon	938 (88)*	
75	2024	Telford	Levitation	Jackie Burns, Genevieve Cogman, Michelle Sagara /(Michelle West), Tade Thompson, Elsa Sjunneson, Dr Srinarahari	640 (75)*	
76	2025	Belfast	Reconnect	Lauren Beukes, Derek Landy, Jeannette Ng, Rebecca Roanhorse, Will Simpson (comics), Ian McDonald (British author)	999 (50)*	
77	2026	Birmingham	Iridescence	RJ Barker, Emma Newman, Karen Lord, John Wilson, Serena Culfeather		
78	2027	Glasgow	Unconfined	P. Djeli Clark, L. R. Lam, Mark Meenan, Tamsyn Muir		

Notes:

- Early conventions did not always have a particular name, and sometimes were given a name retrospectively when another Eastercon was held in the same town, eg, Brumcon only acquired its name when Brumcon II was held.
- The 1957 convention held in Kettering has acquired a semi-mythical status among British fandom, as there does not appear to be any surviving contemporary documentation from the con itself; however, there is just enough evidence from fanzines of the time and other fan memorabilia to suggest that it did, in fact, take place.
- The official numbering of the conventions has been somewhat adjusted, following the naming of the 1972 convention as "Eastercon 22" which necessitated the counting of 21 previous Eastercons, which is why the 1951 Festivention is not counted.
- Convoy, the 2007 Eastercon elected by members of Concussion, was cancelled at the end of October 2006. Contemplation was formed at the 2006 Novacon by Chris O'Shea and Fran Dowd as a very short notice emergency replacement. Convoy's guests of honour were invited to attend, and Sharyn November initially accepted, but she was ultimately unable to attend due to work commitments.
- Pasgon was elected at Dysprosium to be the 2017 Eastercon to be held in Cardiff, but had to be cancelled in March 2016 due to issues with its planned venue. Eastercon 2017/Innominate in Birmingham was elected in its place at Mancunicon.
- The 2020 convention, Concentric was cancelled less than a month before it was scheduled, due to recently announced UK Government guidelines related to the coronavirus pandemic. An online bidding session was held, with ConFusion selected for the 2021 Eastercon. 846 members had registered before the convention was cancelled.
- The 2021 Eastercon, ConFusion was originally planned as an in person event, but was converted to an online event when it became clear that an in person convention would not be possible. 466 people took part in the online convention.
- The 2022 convention, Reclamation had 797 registered members. 659 were physically present. 80 people viewed streamed panels, 41 of those were not present at the convention.
- The 2024 Convention was the first to be held at the ICC Telford, and marked a divergence from tradition, in that the convention was only the second to be held in a conference centre rather than in a hotel; the first was 2004 (Blackpool) which was held at the Winter Gardens.
- The 2025 Convention was the first to be held on the island of Ireland.
- Virtual/Online attendance shown in parentheses where available.
