= Vector (journal) =

Critical magazine of the British Science Fiction Association

- Cover of issue 294
- Editor: Phoenix Alexander
- Editor: Polina Levontin
- Editor: Jo L. Walton
- Former editors: Anna McFarlane, Glyn Morgan, Shana Worthen, Niall Harrison, Geneva Melzack, Andrew M. Butler, Tony Cullen, Gary Dalkin, Maureen Kincaid Speller, Catie Cary, Kev McVeigh, Boyd Parkinson, David Barrett, Paul Kincaid, Geoff Rippington, Alan Dorey, Kevin Smith, Alan Dorey, Eve Harvey, Joseph Nicholas, Mike Dickinson, Dave Wingrove, Christopher Fowler, Malcolm Edwards, Bob Parkinson, Michael Kenward, Tony Sudberry, Vic Hallett, Phil Muldowney, Doreen Parker, Ken Slater, Steve Oakley, Roger Peyton, Jim Groves, Ella Parker, Archie Mercer, Roberta Gray, Michael Moorcock, Terry Jeeves, E.C. Tubb
- Categories: Science fiction
- Format: A4
- First issue: Summer 1958
- Company: British Science Fiction Association (BSFA)
- Country: United Kingdom
- Based in: London
- Language: English
- Website: vector-bsfa.com
- ISSN: 0505-0448

Vector is the critical journal (sometimes called a fanzine) of the British Science Fiction Association (BSFA), established in 1958.

== History ==
The first issue of Vector was published in 1958 under the editorship of E. C. Tubb. The publication was established as an irregular newsletter for members of the BSFA, founded in the same year, but "almost at once it began to produce reviews and essays, polemics and musings, about the nature and state of science fiction."

The publication has changed format and periodicity many times over the years. Since 2018 it has been edited by Polina Levontin and Jo Lindsay Walton, with Phoenix Alexander joining as editor-in-chief in 2024. It currently focuses on articles and interviews, and is published "two to three times per year."

== Reviews ==
- Imagine #10
- Imagine #11
- Imagine #16
