= Novacon =

Novacon is an annual science fiction convention, usually held each November in the English Midlands. Launched in 1971, it has been hosted by the Birmingham Science Fiction Group since 1972.

== List of Novacons ==
No	Year	Name	Location	Guests of Honour	Attendance*
1	1971	NOVACON	Imperial Centre, Birmingham	James White	144
2	1972	NOVACON 2	Imperial Centre, Birmingham	Doreen Rogers	144
3	1973	NOVACON 3	Imperial Centre, Birmingham	Ken Bulmer	146
4	1974	NOVACON 4	Imperial Centre, Birmingham	Ken Slater	211
5	1975	NOVACON 5	Royal Angus Hotel, Birmingham	Dan Morgan	272
6	1976	NOVACON 6	Royal Angus Hotel, Birmingham	David Kyle	317
7	1977	NOVACON 7	Royal Angus Hotel, Birmingham	John Brunner	278
8	1978	NOVACON 8	Holiday Inn, Birmingham	Anne McCaffrey	309
9	1979	NOVACON 9	Royal Angus Hotel, Birmingham	Christopher Priest	290
10	1980	NOVACON 10	Royal Angus Hotel, Birmingham	Brian W. Aldiss	495
11	1981	NOVACON 11	Royal Angus Hotel, Birmingham	Bob Shaw	362
12	1982	NOVACON 12	Royal Angus Hotel, Birmingham	Harry Harrison	373
13	1983	NOVACON 13	Royal Angus Hotel, Birmingham	Lisa Tuttle	339
14	1984	NOVACON 14	Grand Hotel, Birmingham	Robert Holdstock	333
15	1985	NOVACON 15	De Vere Hotel, Coventry	James White, David Langford	340
16	1986	NOVACON 16	De Vere Hotel, Coventry	E. C. Tubb, Chris Evans	257
17	1987	NOVACON 17	Royal Angus Hotel, Birmingham	Iain M. Banks	315
18	1988	NOVACON 18	Royal Angus Hotel, Birmingham	Garry Kilworth	336
19	1989	NOVACON 19	Excelsior, Solihull	Geoff Ryman	303
20	1990	NOVACON 20	Excelsior, Solihull	Jack Cohen	330
21	1991	NOVACON 21	Forte Poste House, Solihull	Colin Greenland	200
22	1992	NOVACON 22	Royal Angus Hotel, Birmingham	Storm Constantine	300
23	1993	NOVACON 23	Royal Angus Hotel, Birmingham	Stephen Baxter	243
24	1994	NOVACON 24	Royal Angus Hotel, Birmingham	Graham Joyce	214
25	1995	NOVACON 25	Chamberlain Hotel, Birmingham	Brian Aldiss, Bob Shaw, Harry Harrison; Iain Banks (special guest)	338
26	1996	NOVACON 26	Hotel Ibis, Birmingham	David Gemmell	281
27	1997	NOVACON 27	Abbey Hotel, Great Malvern	Peter F. Hamilton	277
28	1998	NOVACON 28	Britannia Hotel, Birmingham	Paul J. McAuley	265
29	1999	NOVACON 29	Britannia Hotel, Birmingham	Ian Stewart	239
30	2000	NOVACON 30	Britannia Hotel, Birmingham	Christopher Priest; Rog Peyton (special guest); David A. Hardy (guest artist)	224
31	2001	NOVACON 31	Quality Hotel, Bentley	Gwyneth Jones	219
32	2002	NOVACON 32	Quality Hotel, Bentley	Ian McDonald	252
33	2003	NOVACON 33	Quality Hotel, Bentley	Jon Courtenay Grimwood	203
34	2004	NOVACON 34	Quality Hotel, Bentley	Ian Watson	217
35	2005	NOVACON 35	Quality Hotel, Bentley	Alastair Reynolds	216
36	2006	NOVACON 36	Quality Hotel, Bentley	Ken MacLeod	212
37	2007	NOVACON 37	Quality Hotel, Bentley	Charles Stross	208
38	2008	NOVACON 38	Quality Hotel, Bentley	Ian R MacLeod; Vernon Brown (fan guest)	177
39	2009	NOVACON 39	Park Inn, Nottingham	Justina Robson	210
40	2010	NOVACON 40	Park Inn, Nottingham	Iain M Banks; Brian W. Aldiss (special guest)	262
41	2011	NOVACON 41	Park Inn, Nottingham	John Meaney	tbc
42	2012	NOVACON 42	Park Inn, Nottingham	Jaine Fenn	tbc
43	2013	NOVACON 43	Park Inn, Nottingham	Jo Walton	tbc
44	2014	NOVACON 44	Park Inn, Nottingham	Kari Sperring; John Gribbin (science guest)	tbc
45	2015	NOVACON 45	Park Inn, Nottingham	Anne and Stan Nichols	tbc
46	2016	NOVACON 46	Park Inn, Nottingham	Juliet McKenna	tbc
47	2017	NOVACON 47	Park Inn, Nottingham	Adrian Tchaikovsky	tbc
48	2018	NOVACON 48	Park Inn, Nottingham	Chris Beckett	tbc
49	2019	NOVACON 49	Nottingham Sherwood Hotel, Nottingham	Mike Carey	tbc
50	2020	NOVACON 50	Nottingham Sherwood Hotel, Nottingham	(Postponed to 2021)	tbc
50	2021	NOVACON 50	Palace Hotel, Buxton	Chris Baker, Emma Newman (unable to attend), Claire North, Christopher Priest	tbc
51	2022	NOVACON 51	Palace Hotel, Buxton	Gareth L. Powell	tbc
52	2023	NOVACON 51	Palace Hotel, Buxton	Jen Williams	tbc

(*Attendance figures taken from individual programme books and may not reflect the final figures; for instance, more than 500 people attended Novacon 14.)
