= British Science Fiction Association =

British organization to promote Sci-Fi

British Science Fiction Association Limited
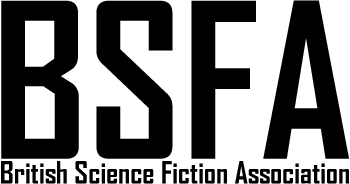
- Abbreviation: BSFA
- Predecessor: Science Fiction Association (SFA)
- Formation: 1958
- Legal status: Private company limited by guarantee
- Location: United Kingdom
- Chair: Stewart Hotston
- President: Pat Cadigan
- Vice-President: Tade Thompson
- Website: bsfa.co.uk

The British Science Fiction Association Limited is an organisation founded in 1958 by a group of British academics, science fiction fans, authors, publishers and booksellers in order to promote the writing, criticism, and study of science fiction in every form. The first President of the BSFA was Brian Aldiss. Pat Cadigan became president in August 2020, and Tade Thompson became the Vice President in June 2021.

The BSFA Awards are presented annually by the British Science Fiction Association, based on a vote of BSFA members and members of the British national SF convention (Eastercon). The BSFA also nominates two out of five of each year's judging panel for the Arthur C. Clarke Award.

== History ==
The BSFA was the fourth attempt to set up a national organisation of science fiction fans in Britain. The first attempt, the Science Fiction Association (SFA), was set up in 1937 by fans who attended the first British science fiction convention in Leeds in May of that year, and was "devoted to the stimulation of interest in science fiction and scientific progress". It was disbanded on the outbreak of World War II barely two years later.

The second attempt was called the British Fantasy Society (no connection with the later organisation of the same name), and was established in June 1942 by many of the people behind the SFA with the objective of giving members better access to science fiction through its extensive library. The British Fantasy Society did not last long and was wound-up in November 1946.

The third attempt was in 1948, when Captain Ken Slater proposed the founding of a new national fan organisation. From this, the Science Fantasy Society was born. Slater was later posted to the army in Germany and the remaining committee members did not share his "flaming enthusiasm" for the organisation; in September 1951 the SFS was declared to be "a glorious flop".

By the late 1950s, British science fiction fandom was in serious decline. The annual Eastercon had become a purely social event with a rapidly diminishing attendance (150 in 1954, 115 in 1955, 80 in 1956, fewer than 50 in 1958). Spurred by this, the 1958 Eastercon held in Kettering held a discussion on the whole future of British fandom. It was agreed that both British fanzines and science fiction conventions had become inward-looking and had moved so far away from science fiction that they were not attractive to newcomers. It was decided that the way forward was a new national organisation devoted to the serious study of science fiction that would also carry material in its publication about fandom. After considerable debate on the name ("science fiction" was considered a stigma in dealing with the Press), the BSFA was formed, and by its first anniversary it had over 100 members.

== Publications ==
The BSFA is responsible for four publications:

- Vector – the critical journal of the BSFA, launched in 1958. Published two to three times a year.
- Focus – the BSFA's writers magazine, launched in 1979. Published twice a year.
- The BSFA Review – a digital only magazine, launched in late 2017. Published approximately four times a year.
- Fission – a digital only fiction anthology, launched in 2021. Published once a year.

Previous publications include:

- Tangent – a fiction magazine, published in 1965 and 1977–1978.
- Paperback Inferno (initially Paperback Parlour) – a review magazine which ceased publication in 1992 with issue 97.
- Matrix – a news magazine which ceased publication in 2007, with issue 186.
- The Quantum – a newsletter which succeeded Matrix and lasted for six issues, ceasing publication in 2012.

== See also ==
- Aldiss Award - Annual award co-managed by the BSFA, British Fantasy Society, and The Association for UK Interactive Entertainment
- BSFA Awards
