= List of awards and nominations received by Geoff Ryman =

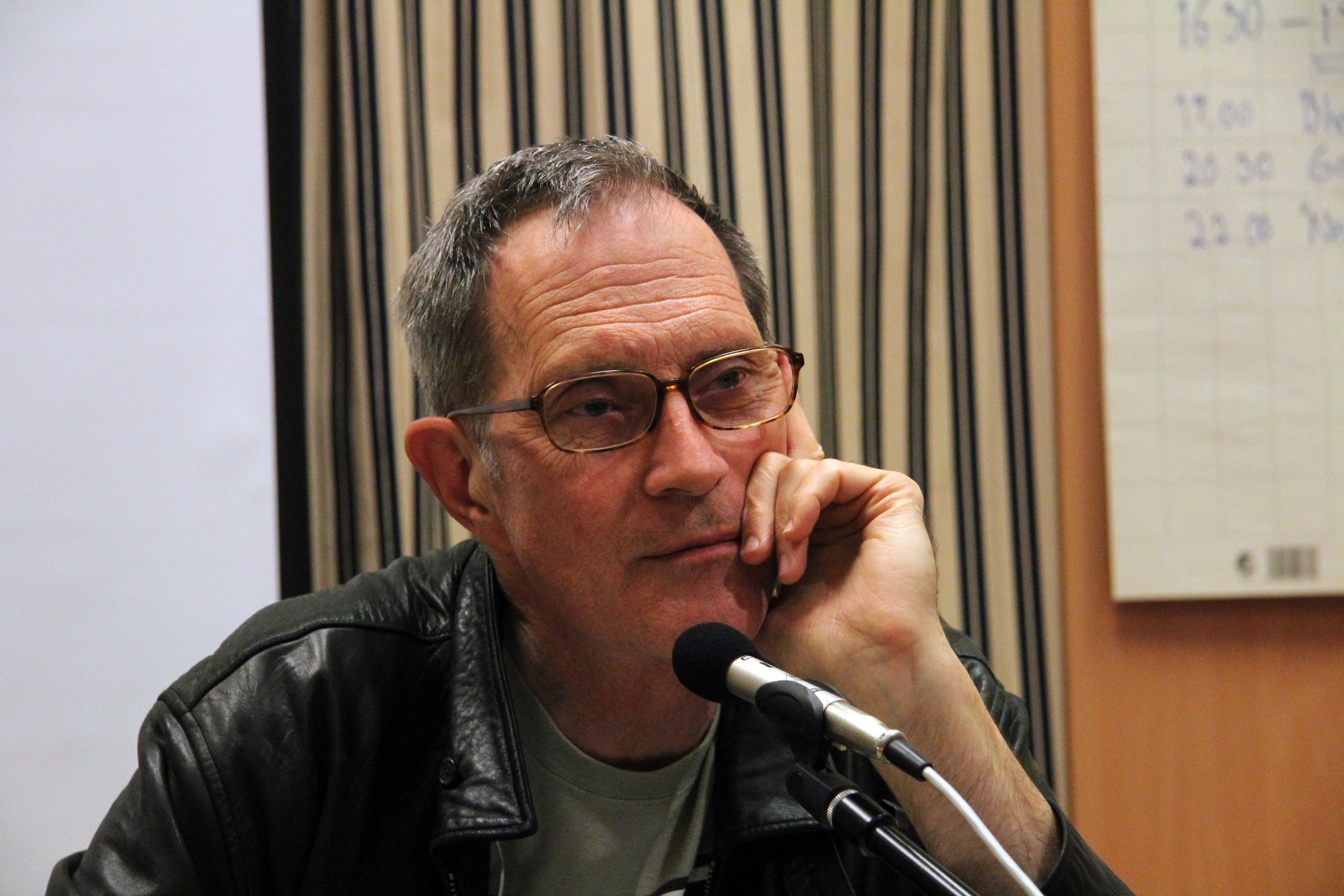
Geoff Ryman at Åcon 2010

Geoff Ryman (born 1951) is a writer of science fiction, fantasy, historical fiction, he was also one of the founding members of the Mundane science fiction movement. In 2008 a Mundane SF issue of Interzone magazine was published, guest edited by Geoff Ryman, Julian Todd and Trent Walters. Ryman says he knew he was a writer "before [he] could talk", with his first work published in his Mother's newspaper column at six years of age. He is most well known for his science fiction writing, however his first novel was the fantasy The Warrior Who Carried Life, and his revisionist fantasy Was has been called "his most accomplished work".

Much of his work is based on travels to Cambodia. The first of these The Unconquered Country (1986) was winner of the World Fantasy Award and British Science Fiction Association Award. His novel The King's Last Song (2006) was set both in the Angkor Wat era and the time after Pol Pot and the Khmer Rouge.

He was guest of honour at Novacon in 1989 and has twice been a guest speaker at Microcon, in 1994 and in 2004. He was also the guest of honour at Gaylaxicon 2008.

Ryman has written and published seven novels, including an early example of a hypertext novel, 253, or Tube Theatre. He is currently at work on a new historical novel set in the United States before the Civil War. His novels and novelas have won multiple awards, including the World Fantasy Award, and his novel Was was inducted into the Gaylactic Spectrum Hall of Fame. His novel 'Air was nominated for eight awards, winning four. In total, Ryman's works have been nominated for 59 speculative fiction awards.

== Arthur C. Clarke Awards ==
The Arthur C. Clarke Award is a British award given for the best science fiction novel first published in the United Kingdom during the previous year. The award was established with a grant from Arthur C. Clarke and the first prize was awarded in 1987. The book is chosen by a panel of judges from the British Science Fiction Association, the Science Fiction Foundation and a third organization, currently SF Crowsnest. It is now administered by the Serendip Foundation. The winner receives a prize consisting of a number of pounds sterling equal to the current year (£2008 for year 2008). In recent years, the award has been presented on the opening night of the SCI-FI-LONDON film festival.

Year	Nominee / work	Award	Result
1990	The Child Garden	Arthur C. Clarke Award	Won
2005	Air, or Have Not Have	Arthur C. Clarke Award	Won

== British Science Fiction Association Awards ==
The British Science Fiction Association (BSFA) annually presents four awards (though numbers have differed in previous years) based on a vote of BSFA members and recently also members of the Eastercon. Ryman's works have been nominated ten times in the novel and short fiction categories, and won three times.

Year	Nominee / work	Award	Result
1984	"The Unconquered Country"	British Science Fiction Association Award for best short fiction	Won
1986	"O Happy Day!"	British Science Fiction Association Award for best short fiction	Nominated
1986	The Warrior Who Carried Life	British Science Fiction Association Award for best novel	Nominated
1988	"Love Sickness"	British Science Fiction Association Award for best short fiction	Won
1990	The Child Garden	British Science Fiction Association Award for best novel	Nominated
1995	"Warmth"	British Science Fiction Association Award for best short fiction	Nominated
2002	"Lust"	British Science Fiction Association Award for best novel	Nominated
2004	"Birth Days"	British Science Fiction Association Award for best short fiction	Nominated
2006	Air, or Have Not Have	British Science Fiction Association Award for best novel	Won
2016	100 African Writers of SFF	British Science Fiction Association Award for best non-fiction	Won
2024	Him	British Science Fiction Association Award for best novel	

== John W. Campbell Memorial Award ==
Year	Nominee / work	Award	Result
1988	The Unconquered Country	John W. Campbell Memorial Award for best SF novel	3rd
1990	The Child Garden	John W. Campbell Memorial Award for best SF novel	Won
2005	Air, or Have Not Have	John W. Campbell Memorial Award for best SF novel	2nd

== Gaylactic Spectrum Awards ==
Year	Nominee / work	Award	Result
2002	Was	Gaylactic Spectrum Hall of Fame	Inducted
2004	Lust	Gaylactic Spectrum Award for Best Novel	Nominated

== Interzone Poll ==
Year	Nominee / work	Award	Result
1985	The Unconquered Country	Interzone Poll for best fiction	Won
1995	"Fan"	Interzone Poll for best fiction	6th (tie)
1995	"Dead Space for the Unexpected"	Interzone Poll for best fiction	10th (tie)
1996	"Warmth"	Interzone Poll for best fiction	3rd (tie)

== James Tiptree, Jr. Award ==
Year	Nominated work	Category	Result	Notes
1995	Unconquered Countries	Tiptree award for best fiction	Nominated	—
2004	"Birth Days"	Tiptree award for best fiction	Nominated	—
2006	"Air"	Tiptree award for best fiction	Won	—
2006	Tesseracts Nine	Tiptree award for best fiction	Nominated	Co-edited with Nalo Hopkinson

== Locus Awards ==
Year	Nominated work	Category	Result	Notes
1985	"The Unconquered Country"	Locus Award for Best Novella	12	—
1986	O Happy Day!	Locus Award for Best Novelette	22	—
1986	The Warrior Who Carried Life	Locus Award for Best First Novel	15	—
1987	The Unconquered Country	Locus Award for Best Novel	22	—
1988	"Love Sickness"	Locus Award for Best Novella	8	—
1990	The Child Garden	Locus Award for best science fiction novel	21	—
1993	Was	Locus Award for Best Fantasy Novel	5	—
1994	"A Fall of Angels, or On the Possibility of Life Under Extreme Conditions"	Locus Award for Best Novella	12	—
1994	"Fan"	Locus Award for Best Novella	14	—
1995	Unconquered Countries	Locus Award for Best collection	5	—
1995	"Home"	Locus Award for Best Short Story	14	—
1999	"Everywhere"	Locus Award for Best Short Story	12 (tie)	—
2002	"Have Not Have"	Locus Award for Best Short Story	Nominated	—
2003	"V.A.O."	Locus Awards for Best Novelette	20	—
2004	"Birth Days"	Locus Award for Best Short Story	33	—
2005	Air	Locus Award for best science fiction novel	14	—
2006	"The Last Ten Years in the Life of Hero Kai"	Locus Award for Best Novelette	8	—
2006	Tesseracts Nine	Locus Award for Best anthology	12	Co-edited with Nalo Hopkinson
2007	"Pol Pot's Beautiful Daughter (Fantasy)"	Locus Award for Best Novelette	2	
2009	The Film-makers of Mars	Locus Award for Best Short Story	19	
2009	Days of Wonder	Locus Award for Best Novelette	16	
2010	Blocked	Locus Award for Best Short Story	10	
2012	Paradise Tales	Locus Award for best science fiction collection	6	
2014	Rosary and Goldenstar	Locus Award for Best Short Story	11	
2017	Those Shadows Laugh	Locus Award for Best Novelette	8	

== Nebula Awards ==
Year	Nominee / work	Award	Result
1988	The Unconquered Country	Nebula Award for Best Novella	Nominated
1995	Fan	Nebula Award for Best Novella	Nominated
2006	Air, or Have Not Have	Nebula Award for Best Novel	Nominated
2008	Pol Pot's Beautiful Daughter (Fantasy)	Nebula Award for Best Novelette	Nominated

== Philip K. Dick Award ==
Year	Nominee / work	Award	Result
1999	253	Philip K. Dick Award	Won
2005	Air, or Have Not Have	Philip K. Dick Award	Nominated

== Theodore Sturgeon Awards ==
Year	Nominee / work	Award	Result
2000	"Everywhere"	Theodore Sturgeon Award	Nominated
2002	"Have not Have"	Theodore Sturgeon Award	Nominated

== World Fantasy Award ==
Year	Nominated work	Category	Result	Notes
1985	The Unconquered Country	World Fantasy Award for Best Novella	Won	—
1993	Was	World Fantasy Award for Best Novel	Nominated	—
2007	Pol Pot's Beautiful Daughter (Fantasy)	World Fantasy Award for best Short Fiction	Nominated	—

== Other awards ==
Year	Nominated work	Category	Result	Notes
1988	The Warrior Who Carried Life	Crawford Award	Nominated	Given by International Association for the Fantastic in the Arts to a first fantasy novel published in the preceding 18 months.
1998	"Family"	BSFA Award for best short story	Nominated	Given by the British Science Fiction Association (BSFA) to a short story published in Britain in the preceding year. Based on a vote of BSFA members and attendees the Eastercon.
2004	Air	Sunburst for best novel	Won	—
2006	Tesseracts 9	Prix Aurora Award for best other work in English	Won	Co-edited with Nalo Hopkinson
2007	"Pol Pot's Beautiful Daughter (Fantasy)"	Hugo Award for best novelette	Nominated	—

== See also ==
- Geoff Ryman bibliography
