= Geoff Ryman bibliography =

Geoff Ryman (born 1951) is a writer of science fiction, fantasy and slipstream fiction. Ryman has written and published seven novels, including an early example of a hypertext novel, 253. He has won multiple awards, including the World Fantasy Award.

== Novels ==
=== The Warrior Who Carried Life ===
The Warrior Who Carried Life
- Author: Geoff Ryman
- Publisher: Allen & Unwin
- Publication date: 1985
- ISBN: 978-0-04-823266-3

This novel was nominated for the BSFA Award for Best Novel.

Summary
Cara's face is horribly scarred and her body mutilated by the knives of barbarians. She seeks aid from a strange magic that for one year will transform her into the most dangerous of beasts: a man. Cara becomes a powerful warrior and takes revenge on the barbarians but learns too late that murder only begets more murder. To cleanse the stain of evil, Cara travels to the Land of the Dead to retrieve the Flower of Life, an aspect of God with the power to heal. Cara finds help and companionship from Stefile, a young woman who loves the warrior but cannot accept he will return to a woman's body in a year's time.

=== The Child Garden ===
The Child Garden
- Author: Geoff Ryman
- Publisher: Unwin Hyman
- Publication date: 1989
- ISBN: 0-04-440393-3

This novel won the Arthur C. Clarke Award and the John W. Campbell Memorial Award.

Summary
In a future tropical England, transformed by global warming and by advances in genetic engineering, cancer has been cured. Milena, a young woman who is immune to the viruses which are routinely used to educate people, attempts to stage an opera based on Dante's Divine Comedy using holograms, written by her genetically modified friend Rolfa. She encounters the ruling body of the world, "The Consensus" a hive mind made up of the mental patterns of billions of children. Milena slowly discovers that this gestalt consciousness is lonely and afraid of dying and is looking to Milena as a form of salvation. In the closing scenes of the story, as Milena succumbs to cancer, the Consensus experiences a fracturing of its self that may be its death or may be its transition to higher plane of consciousness.

=== Was ===
Was
- Author: Geoff Ryman
- Publisher: HarperCollins
- Publication date: 1992
- ISBN: 978-0-00-223931-8

This novel was a finalist for the World Fantasy Award—Novel.

Summary
The novel is separated into three parts: Winter Kitchen, Summer Kitchen, and Oz Circle. The primary focus is put on Jonathan, a gay male actor with AIDS who goes on a pilgrimage of sorts to Manhattan, Kansas and the "real" (but imaginary) Dorothy on whom the book's fictional version of L. Frank Baum based the character.
Other characters include Baum, who makes an appearance as a substitute teacher in Kansas. Millie, a makeup girl on the set of the original film version film narrates an encounter with Judy Garland, its lead actress.

=== 253 (or, Tube Theatre) ===
253
- Author: Geoff Ryman
- Publisher: first published as hypertext fiction on ryman-novel.com
- Publication date: ? (hypertext version); 1998 (print version)

The print version won a Philip K. Dick Award.

Summary
It is about the 253 people on a London Underground train travelling between Embankment station and Elephant & Castle on January 11, 1995. Each character is introduced in a separate section containing 253 words. The sections give general details and describe the thoughts going through the characters' heads. In the online version, hypertext links led to other characters who are nearby or who have some connection to the current character; in the print version, the links are partly replaced by a traditional index. The reader can proceed from one character to another using these devices or can read the novel in positional order, e.g. from one train car to the next, but there is no overall chronological order except in the final section.

=== Lust ===
Lust
- Author: Geoff Ryman
- Publication date: 2001

Summary
Follows a gay man who finds that his sexual fantasies [are] magically coming true.

=== Air: Or, Have Not Have ===
Air: Or, Have Not Have
- Author: Geoff Ryman
- Publication date: 2005

This novel won the BSFA Award for Best Novel, the James Tiptree, Jr. Award, and the Arthur C. Clarke Award, and was short-listed for a Nebula Award for Best Novel. It was expanded to a novel from the short story "Have Not Have".

Summary
Air is the story of a town's fashion expert Chung Mae, a smart but illiterate peasant woman in a small village in the fictional country of Karzistan (loosely based on the country of Kazakhstan), and her suddenly leading role in reaction to dramatic, worldwide experiments with a new information technology called Air. Air is information exchange, not unlike the Internet, that occurs in everyone's brain and is intended to connect the world. After a test of Air is imposed on Mae's unprepared mountain town, everyone and everything changes, especially Mae who was deeper into Air than any other person. Afterwards, Mae struggles to prepare her people for what is to come while learning all about the world outside her home.

=== The King's Last Song ===
The King's Last Song
- Author: Geoff Ryman
- Publication date: 2006 UK, 2008 US

Summary
Set in Cambodia, it tells the story of Map, a policeman and former Khmer Rouge, and young motoboy William as they search for the gold leaf memoirs of the 12th century king Jayavarman VII, which have been stolen by a former lieutenant of Pol Pot. The memoir is fictional, but Jayavarman is not, and an account of his life and reign is told in a parallel thread. In addition there is a lengthy flashback to Map's violent activities in the last years of the Cambodian war. The novel makes explicit the contrast between ancient Cambodia's opulence and the poverty and corruption of its modern counterpart.

=== Him ===
Him
- Author: Geoff Ryman
- Publication date: 2023

Summary
In Nazareth, virgin wife Maryam gives birth to a miracle: a little girl named Avigayil. But as Avigayil grows, it’s clear she believes that she is destined to be someone else; Avigayil is determined to live life as Yeshu, a man.

=== Animals ===
Animals
- Author: Geoff Ryman
- Publication date: 2025

Summary
The novel tells the story of one family in the wake of mass attacks on humans by animals.

=== Short fiction ===
Collections

- Unconquered Countries: Four Novellas (1994)

Stories

| Title | Year | First published | Reprinted/collected | Notes |
|---|---|---|---|---|
| Days of wonder | 2008 | Ryman, Geoff (October–November 2008). "Days of wonder". F&SF. 115 (4&5): 54–94. | | Novelette |
| The diary of the translator | 1976 | | | |
| Have not have | 2001 | Ryman, Geoff (April 2001). "Have not have". F&SF. 100 (4): 4–25. | | Expanded into the novel Air. |
| Zoo Story | 1979 | | | |
| The Unconquered Country | 1984 | | | Published as a stand-alone novel (1986) and as a novella in the collection Unconquered Countries (1994). |
| O Happy Day! | 1985 | | | |
| Love Sickness | 1987 | | | This formed the first section of A Child Garden. |
| Omnisexual | 1990 | | | |
| Dead Space for the Unexpected | 1994 | | | |
| Fan | 1994 | | | |
| A Fall of Angels, or On the Possibility of Life Under Extreme Conditions | 1994 | | | |
| Home | 1995 | | | |
| Warmth | 1995 | | | |
| Family, or The Nativity and Flight into Egypt Considered as Episodes of I Love Lucy | 1998 | | | |
| Everywhere | 1999 | | | |
| V.A.O. | 2002 | | | |
| Birth Days | 2003 | | | |
| The Last Ten Years in the Life of Hero Kai | 2005 | | | |
| Pol Pot's Beautiful Daughter (Fantasy) | 2006 | | | |
| Talk Is Cheap | 2008 | | | |
| Days of Wonder | 2008 | | | |
| Blocked | 2009 | | | |
| The Film-makers of Mars | 2010 | | | |
| What We Found | 2011 | | | |
| The Many Different Kinds of Love (with David Jeffrey) | 2023 | Ryman, Geoff (November–December 2023). "The many different kinds of love". F&SF. 145 (5&6): 6–75. | | Novella |

=== Anthology editor ===
- Tesseracts Nine with Nalo Hopkinson (2005)

== Other publications ==
Ryman contributed to When it changed: ‘real science’ Science Fiction (2010)

== See also ==
- List of awards and nominations received by Geoff Ryman
