= Microcon =

University of Exeter Science Fiction Society T-shirt logo designed by Kevin Clarke in 1982 for the first Microcon. The design features "Sluggy", the alien mascot of the original society. Photographed in 2008 by Steve Green and reproduced here with the artist's permission.

Microcon was an annual science fiction and fantasy convention, held annually at the University of Exeter in Exeter, Devon, England since 1982, usually over the first weekend in March. It was organised by the Exeter University Science Fiction and Fantasy Society.

== History and guest speakers ==
- Microcon (12–13 March 1982): Lisa Tuttle
- Microcon II (5–6 February 1983): According to a contemporary report, there was no guest of honour at this event.

(As the numbering increased by five in just four years, it appears likely it jumped a digit during 1984 - 1986)

- Microcon 7 (1987): Tom Shippey
- Microcon 8 (1988): Terry Pratchett, Iain Banks, Neil Gaiman, Dave Langford, Diana Wynne Jones, Colin Greenland, John Brunner, John Grant, Fox, Fay Sampson, Chris Bell
- Microcon 9 (1989): David V. Barrett, Adrian Cole, Storm Constantine, Mary Gentle, Fox, Colin Greenland, John Grant, Dave Langford, Pete Loveday, Terry Pratchett, Fay Sampson, Ron Tiner, Diana Wynne Jones
- Microcon 10 (1990)
- Microcon 11 (1991)
- Microcon 12 (29 February - 1 March 1992): John Brunner
- Microcon 13 (6–7 March 1993): Colin Greenland
- Microcon 14 (5–6 March 1994): Geoff Ryman, John Clute, John Grant, Colin Greenland, Stephen Marley, Richard Middleton
- Microcon 15 (4–5 March 1995): Ramsey Campbell
- Microcon 16 (2–3 March 1996): Diana Wynne Jones, Fay Sampson
- Microcon 17 (1–2 March 1997): Christopher Priest, Leigh Kennedy
- Microcon 18 (28 February - 1 March 1998): Brian Stableford
- Microcon 19 (6–7 March 1999): Dave Langford
- Microcon 20 (4–5 March 2000): Nick Redfern (originally planned to be Kim Newman, who apparently didn't receive the invitation)
- Microcon 21 (3–4 March 2001): Jon Courtenay Grimwood
- Microcon 22 (2–3 March 2002): Gwyneth Jones
- Microcon 23 (1–2 March 2003): Jasper Fforde
- Microcon 24 (6–7 March 2004): Geoff Ryman
- Microcon 25 (5-6 Mar 2005): Keith Brooke, Richard Freeman, Mags Halliday, Paul Hinder, Ben Jeapes, Mark Leyland, James Lovegrove, Fay Sampson, Nick Walters, Beth Webb, Lee Wood
- Microcon 26 (4–5 March 2006): Fay Sampson, Nick Walters, Christina Lake, Richard Freeman, Joanne Hall, Mark Leyland, Paul Cornell, Jasper Fforde
- Microcon 27 (3–4 March 2007): Jasper Fforde, Richard Freeman, Colin Harvey, Joanne Hall, Mark Leyland, Fay Sampson, Nick Walters
- Microcon 28 (1–2 March 2008): Pat Cadigan, Richard Freeman, Steve Green, Joanne Hall, Colin Harvey, Michelle Parslow, Nick Walters
- Microcon 29 (21–22 February 2009): Doug Bell, Val Cornish, Richard Freeman, Steve Green, Christina Lake, Mark Leyland, Fay Sampson, Nick Walters (Jasper Fforde had to cancel at the last minute)
- Microcon 30 (6–7 March 2010): Richard Freeman, Steve Green, Ben Jeapes, Joel Lane, Nick Walters (Alasdair Stuart had to cancel at the last minute)
- Microcon 2011 (5–6 March 2011): Mark Clapham, Richard Freeman, Joanne Hall, Colin Harvey, Beth Webb, Nick Walters
- Microcon 2012 (25–26 February 2012): Jasper Fforde, Richard Freeman, Steve Green, David A. Hardy, Philip Reeve, Nick Walters, Anneke Wills
- Microcon 2013 (23–24 February 2013): Teresa Derwin, Richard Freeman, Steve Green, Cheryl Morgan, Emma Newman, Kari Sperring and Nick Walters
- Microcon 2014: The event was cancelled due to difficulties obtaining funding.
- Microcon 2015 (7–8 February 2015): Guests included Teresa Derwin, Richard Freeman, Steve Green, Joanne Hall and Nick Walters

== Misnumbering ==
Microcon's misnumbering in the mid-1980s (see above) was spotted during research for Steve Green's 2008 guest presentation.
