= Cokinos =

Cokinos is a surname. Notable people with the surname include:

- Christopher Cokinos (born 1963), American poet and writer
- Dean Cokinos (born c. 1968), American football coach
