= Elizabeth Webb =

Elizabeth Webb may refer to:

- Lizzie Webb (born 1948), British exercise TV presenter
- Beth Webb, British children's author
- Betty Webb, American journalist and author of detective books
- Elizabeth Webb Nicholls (1850–1943), Australian suffragist
- Liz Webb, character in Teachers (British TV series)
