= List of London Underground–related fiction =

Many works of fiction are set in the London Underground system or use it as a major plot element. This is a partial list.

== Novels ==
- Ben Aaronovitch: Whispers Under Ground (2012)
- Margery Allingham: Death of a Ghost (1934). The climax of this murder mystery takes place on the Underground.
- Julian Barnes: Metroland (1981)
- Dan Brown: The Da Vinci Code (2003)
- Agatha Christie: The Man in the Brown Suit (1924). The mystery begins with the death of a passenger at Hyde Park Corner station.
- Tom Clancy: Patriot Games (1987; also 1992 film)
- Christopher Fowler: Bryant and May off the Rails: A Peculiar Crimes Unit Mystery (2011)
- Neil Gaiman: Neverwhere (1997; also 1996 television series)
- Christopher Golden and Tim Lebbon: Mind the Gap: A Novel of the Hidden Cities (2008)
- Lisa Goldstein: Dark Cities Underground (1999)
- James Herbert: The Rats (1974; also 1982 film Deadly Eyes)
- Tobias Hill: Underground (1999). Involves disused South Kentish Town Underground station.
- Russell Hoban: The Underground is a character in Kleinzeit.
- Geoffrey Household: Rogue Male (1939). A pivotal pursuit of the protagonist by an enemy agent sees them repeatedly using the shuttle service on the Aldwych branch line. A chase through Aldwych station ends with the enemy agent's death by electrocution on the track.
- Aldous Huxley: Point Counter Point (1928) An early, character-defining scene takes place on the Underground.
- Lawrence Leonard: The Horn of Mortal Danger (1980)
- Keith Lowe: Tunnel Vision (2001)
- Ian McEwan: Atonement (2001). One of the main protagonists Cecilia Tallis dies during the Blitz in Balham Tube Station.
- Kit Pedler and Gerry Davis: Mutant 59: The Plastic Eater (1971)
- Geoff Ryman: 253 (1997). Set on Bakerloo line.
- Barbara Vine: King Solomon's Carpet (1991)
- Nigel West: The Blue List (1989). This espionage story culminates in the war-time bunker built in the uncompleted tunnels of North End station, although this is incorrectly identified as Paddock, a separate bunker in Dollis Hill.
- Conrad Williams: London Revenant (2004)
- Catherine Storr: The Underground Conspiracy (1987), children's/teen novel. A teenage girl who travels on the Underground for fun soon becomes a pawn in an elaborate plan to use the Underground to transport drugs.

== Short stories ==
- John Betjeman: "South Kentish Town" (1951)
- Agatha Christie: "The Labours of Hercules" (1947). At the beginning of the final story, The Capture of Cerberus, Poirot meets the Countess Vera Rossakoff on the escalators at Piccadilly Circus station.
- Arthur Conan Doyle: "The Adventure of the Bruce-Partington Plans" (1908) (e-text)
- Jeremy Dyson: "City Deep" (2000)
- Christopher Fowler: "Crocodile Lady"
- Samuel Selvon: "Working the Transport" (1957)
- Alice Thompson: "Killing Time" (1990)
- Anthea Turner & Wendy Turner: "Underneath the Underground"
- Connie Willis: "The Winds of Marble Arch" (1999) (online)
- John Wyndham: "Confidence Trick" Jizzle (1954)

== Films ==
- Underground (1928)
- Bulldog Jack (1935)
- Passport to Pimlico (1949)
- Train of Events (1949)
- Seven Days to Noon (1950)
- Georgy Girl (1966)
- Press for Time (1966)
- Daleks - Invasion Earth 2150 AD (1966)
- Quatermass and the Pit (1967) — fictional station Hobbs End
- Battle of Britain (1969)
- The Bed-Sitting Room (1969)
- Death Line (aka Raw Meat) (1972)
- Hanover Street (1979)
- An American Werewolf in London (1981)
- Lifeforce (1985)
- The Fourth Protocol (1987)
- Superman IV: The Quest for Peace (1987)
- Hidden City (1988)
- The Krays (1990)
- Patriot Games (1994)
- Mission: Impossible (1996)
- Secrets & Lies (1996)
- The Wings of the Dove (1997)
- Croupier (1998)
- Sliding Doors (1998)
- Tube Tales (1999)
- Virtual Sexuality (1999)
- The End of the Affair (1999)
- Billy Elliot (2000)
- Bridget Jones's Diary (2001)
- Die Another Day (2002) — fictional station Vauxhall Cross
- Reign of Fire (2002)
- 28 Days Later (2002)
- Mujhse Dosti Karoge! (2002)
- Bend It Like Beckham (2002)
- Love Actually (2003)
- Code 46 (2003)
- The Mother (2003)
- Shaun of the Dead (2004) — fictional station Crouch End
- If Only (2004)
- Touch of Pink (2004)
- Creep (2004)
- Agent Cody Banks 2: Destination London (2004)
- The Football Factory (2004)
- Green Street (2005)
- V for Vendetta (2005)
- The Good Shepherd (2006)
- 28 Weeks Later (2007)
- Harry Potter and the Order of the Phoenix (2007)
- Atonement (2007)
- The Bourne Ultimatum (2007)
- Three and Out (2008)
- The Edge of Love (2008)
- The Escapist (2008)
- Skyfall (2012) — Temple and fictional train derailment
- Darkest Hour (2017)

== Television ==
=== Doctor Who ===
- The Dalek Invasion of Earth (1964)
- The Web of Fear (1967)
- Invasion of the Dinosaurs (1974)
- The Mysterious Planet (The Trial of a Time Lord Parts 1-4) (1986)
- "Rose" (2005) — fictional station

=== Others ===
- Game On
- The setting for 'The Lab' HQ of The Tomorrow People (1973–1979)
- The setting of EastEnders features the fictitious Walford East tube station replacing Bromley-by-Bow.
- CGI "Underground Ernie"
- Primeval (2007)
- Thunderbirds featured Tube stations, but they were deserted due to the series being set in the future.
- Spooks (series 7) (2008)
- The F Word (2008)
- Mr Selfridge (2013)
- Sherlock (2014)

== Music videos ==
- Howard Jones: "New Song" (1984) - Holborn Station
- Boris Gardiner: "I Want To Wake Up With You" (1986) – Westbourne Park Station
- Leftfield: "Release the Pressure" (1992)
- Roxette: "Fireworks" (1994) — Piccadilly Circus Station, external
- The Prodigy: "Firestarter" (1996) — Aldwych Station
- Suede: "Saturday Night" (1997) — Holborn Station, disused platform and tunnel
- Aqua: "Turn Back Time" (1998) — Holborn and Bank Station
- Chemical Brothers: "Believe" (2005) — Goodge Street and Maida Vale Station
- Madonna: "Hung Up" (2005) — Tube stock, Jubilee line between Charing Cross (disused Jubilee line platform) and West Hampstead
- Feeder: "Suffocate" — Monument, Bank, Victoria Station on a District line train
- Feeder: "Piece by Piece" — Monument, Bank, Victoria Station on a District line train
- Oasis: "Mucky Fingers" (live gig only video) — Piccadilly Circus
- Dodgy: "Only A Heartbeat" (2012) — Edgware Road (Bakerloo Branch)
- Example: "Whisky Story" (2015) - From Charing Cross Underground Station, emerging up onto Trafalgar Square.

== Video games ==
- Broken Sword 2
- Call of Duty: Modern Warfare 3
- Creep - The Last Tube
- The Getaway: Black Monday
- Hellgate: London
- Tomb Raider III
- Uncharted 3: Drake's Deception
- Watch Dogs: Legion
- World of Subways 3
- ZombiU

== See also ==
- List of fictional rapid transit stations
- List of television shows set in London
- London in film
- New York City Subway in popular culture
