= Creep (2004 film) =

2004 slasher film by Christopher Smith

- Theatrical release poster
- Directed by: Christopher Smith
- Screenplay by: Christopher Smith
- Produced by: Julie Baines; Jason Newmark
- Starring: Franka Potente; Ken Campbell; Vas Blackwood; Jeremy Sheffield; Sean Harris
- Cinematography: Danny Cohen
- Edited by: Kate Evans
- Music by: The Insects
- Production companies: Dan Films; Zero West
- Distributed by: Pathé (United Kingdom); X Verleih AG (through Warner Bros.; Germany)
- Release dates: 10 August 2004 (Frankfurt Fantasy Filmfest); 28 January 2005 (United Kingdom); 10 March 2005 (Germany)
- Running time: 85 minutes
- Countries: United Kingdom; Germany
- Language: English
- Box office: £1.7 million

Creep is a 2004 slasher film written and directed by British filmmaker Christopher Smith. The film follows a woman locked in the London Underground overnight. She later finds herself being stalked by a hideously deformed killer living in the sewers below. The film was first shown at the Frankfurt Fantasy Film festival in Germany on 10 August 2004.

== Plot ==
Arthur and George are London sewage workers who discover a tunnel in one of the walls. Arthur starts exploring the tunnel alone, while newbie George stays behind. After a while, George enters and discovers Arthur, injured and in shock. A similarly injured woman jumps out, crying for help, only to be pulled back into the darkness.

A young German woman, Kate, decides to join her friend at a party and heads to Charing Cross Underground station but falls asleep on the platform while waiting for the train. When she awakens, she is alone, and the entire station has been locked up for the night. An empty train arrives, and she boards it; it abruptly stops and the lights go dark. She meets Guy, a coworker who follows her and whose awkward advances she repeatedly rejects. Guy attempts to rape her, only to be stopped by an unseen aggressor who drags him out of the train. Guy briefly reemerges, covered in blood, warning Kate to run.

Kate flees and runs into a homeless couple living in a storeroom, Jimmy and Mandy, and their dog Ray. Jimmy reluctantly agrees to help her by taking her to the night guard after she pays him. They find Guy, horribly maimed but still alive. Mandy, left alone, is attacked and kidnapped, triggering Jimmy's sorrow-fueled escape into a heroin-induced stupor. Kate manages to communicate with the security guard via intercom, but the guard is killed before he can call for help, while Guy dies of his injuries. Kate and Jimmy decide to walk through the tunnel to the next station. A train stops near them; Jimmy decides to face the killer to avenge Mandy, but he is slaughtered as well.

Fleeing, Kate falls into the sewer system below, where she finds Arthur's body. She also finds a storage facility with hundreds of boxes, where she is captured by the killer, the titular "creep"—a hideously deformed, mentally ill hermit named Craig, who keeps his victims in semi-submerged, rat-infested cages until they are dead, after which he eats them. Kate is put in one of these cages, along with George, the sewage worker. They escape and end up in an abandoned medical facility, where they find an unconscious Mandy strapped to a surgical chair. Thinking she is dead, they move on. Craig appears, puts on a surgical gown, and mimics the gestures of a surgeon in front of a terrorized Mandy before he disembowels her with a bone saw.

Kate and George find the disused railcar where Craig lives. The dog, Ray, is there, along with old pictures of a medical doctor with a deformed child. Craig ambushes them and kills George. In a last, desperate effort, Kate sinks a hook and chain into Craig's throat, then has a running train rip it apart, and Craig bleeds to death. Disheveled, she returns to the initial station, by which point it is morning. She collapses on the platform, and Ray curls onto her lap. Mistaking her for a beggar, a man waiting for the train leaves her a coin, and Kate breaks into hysterical giggles and tears.

== Cast ==
- Franka Potente as Kate
- Vas Blackwood as George
- Ken Campbell as Arthur
- Jeremy Sheffield as Guy
- Paul Rattray as Jimmy
- Kelly Scott as Mandy
- Joe Anderson as male model
- Sean Harris as Craig, the "Creep"
- Morgan Jones as the Night Watchman

== Production ==
The storyline has been compared to the 1972 film Death Line, also set on the London Underground and featuring a cannibalistic killer. Director Smith, who had not seen Death Line, attributes his inspiration to a scene in An American Werewolf in London set in the London Underground.

According to Smith, Scott did not see Sean Harris in full makeup until the surgery scene was filmed, producing "genuine looks of confusion and fear" from her. The director also admitted deceiving Scott about exactly when he would call cut, an approach a 2006 PopMatters article called "less-than-ethical tricks". However, Smith also noted that he had told Scott that she could call his own name, "Chris", if she needed to stop the take, as well as reassuring her before shooting that Harris would not actually hurt her.

In a making-of featurette on the DVD, Smith praised Scott as "incredible", while Scott herself said, "I've absolutely loved working on this; I don't want it to end." She noted that her colleagues had been "so nice" to her as a first-time film actor.

== Reception ==
=== Critical response ===
Creep has received generally mixed reviews from critics. On the review aggregator website Rotten Tomatoes, 44% of 16 critics' reviews are positive, with an average rating of 4.6/10.

Time Out gave the film a negative review, writing, "this London Underground-set slasher squanders a promising premise for trashy shocks, old-school nastiness and a fistful of genre clichés."

All Movie's review was favorable, writing, "this pared-down shocker might be light on plot, but it's packed with creepy frights and psychopathic attitude from its mean main monster."

Matthew Turner of View London said "The performances are good, particularly Potente, who avoids scream queen clichés by making her character surprisingly unlikeable - Kate is rude and arrogant in her early scenes and the fact that she's German is, of course, a coincidence."

== Reboot ==
In May 2025, Smith was reported to write and direct a reboot of the film, which was expected to start production in autumn 2025. Much of the original film's crew was expected to return, while the cast was expected to include Jasmine Jobson, Aitch, and Andy Nyman. In May 2025, Shudder acquired North American rights.

== See also ==
- List of London Underground-related fiction
