= The King's Last Song =

2006 novel by Geoff Ryman

- First edition
- Author: Geoff Ryman
- Language: English
- Genre: Novel
- Publisher: HarperCollins
- Publication date: 2006
- Publication place: Canada/United Kingdom
- Media type: Print (Hardcover & Paperback)
- Pages: 490 pp
- ISBN: 0-00-225988-5
- OCLC: 62474195

The King's Last Song is a novel by Canadian author Geoff Ryman. It was first published in 2006 by HarperCollins in the UK. It was published in the United States in 2008 by Small Beer Press.

== Plot introduction ==
Set in Cambodia, it tells the story of Map, a policeman and former Khmer Rouge, and young motoboy William as they search for the gold leaf memoirs of the 12th Century king Jayavarman VII, which have been stolen by a former lieutenant of Pol Pot. The memoir is fictional, but Jayavarman is not, and an account of his life and reign is told in a parallel thread. In addition there is a lengthy flashback to Map's violent activities in the last years of the Cambodian war. The novel makes explicit the contrast between ancient Cambodia's opulence and the poverty and corruption of its modern counterpart.
