= Daughter of Tintagel =

Daughter of Tintagel Morgan le Fay
- First omnibus edition (1995)
- Wise Woman's Telling, White Nun's Telling, Black Smith's Telling, Taliesin's Telling, Herself
- Author: Fay Sampson
- Country: UK
- Language: English
- Genre: Historical fantasy
- Publisher: Headline Publishing Group; Trafalgar Square Publishing; Cosmos Books
- Published: 1989-1992

Daughter of Tintagel (retitled Morgan le Fay) is a series of historical fantasy novels by British writer Fay Sampson. It tells the story of the life of Arthurian legend character Morgan le Fay, presented through an oral history narrative from her early childhood to her disappearance. It was originally published as five books between 1989 and 1992, followed by an omnibus edition in 1992. The series was re-published in 2005 as Morgan le Fay.

== Publication history ==
The series was originally written in five volumes, each narrated by a different character. It was first published by Headline as the Daughter of Tintagel series in paperback and hardback:

1. Wise Woman's Telling (August 1989)
2. White Nun's Telling (November 1989)
3. Black Smith's Telling (August 1990)
4. Taliesin's Telling (July 1991)
5. Herself (1992)

Omnibus edition (paperback only) was assembled by Trafalgar Square as Daughter of Tintagel in July 1992.

The series was republished as Morgan le Fay in print-on-demand paperbacks by the Wildside Press imprint Cosmos Books in 2005, two of them slightly retitled (White Nun's Telling into Nun's Telling and Black Smith's Telling into Blacksmith's Telling). An ebook version of Morgan le Fay was also released by Wildside Press, through the Google Play service.

== Synopsis ==
The plot focuses on the love-hate relationship between Morgan le Fay and her half-brother Arthur. The author Fay Sampson classified it as a borderline between historical fiction and fantasy, followed by an "unashamed fantasy" for the final part. As described by the author, "Four people tell Morgan's story: two women, two men, two pagan, two Christian, two sympathetic, two hostile. Lastly, Morgan speaks for herself, and ironically comments on all the writers who have used her story for their own ends."

=== Wise Woman's Telling ===
The story is narrated by Gwennol, Morgan's old nurse and a wise woman in the old religion. Morgan, a clever and self-willed child, is nine years old when Arthur is born. Arthur is the result of Uther Pendragon's deception of her mother Ygerne and his killing of Morgan's adored father. Uther fell in love with Ygerne when Gorlois brought her to court and pursued her to their fortress in Bossiney. Morgan's sister Elaine colludes with Ygerne in making spells to lure Uther. The third sister, Margawse, is lively and shamelessly sexual.

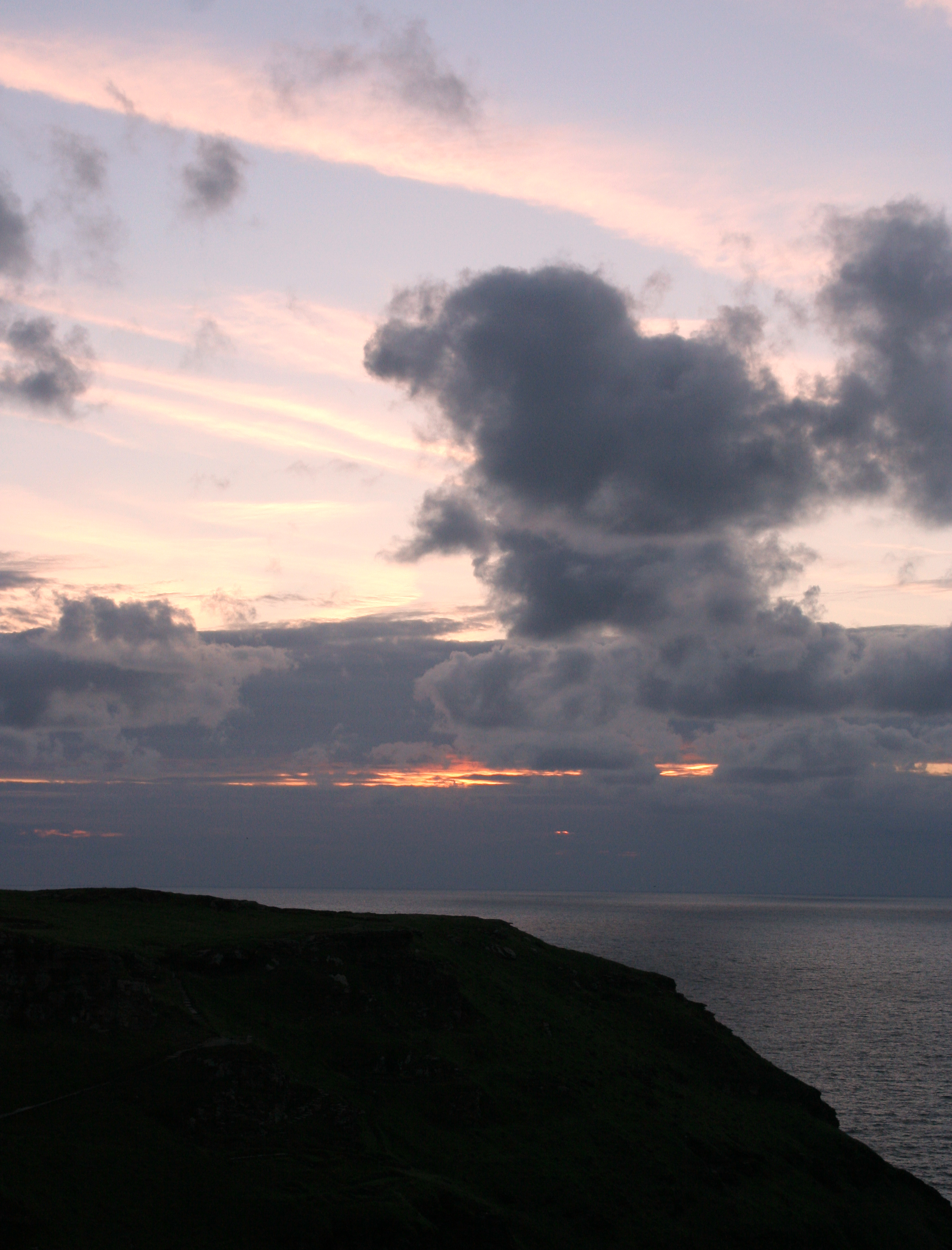
Tintagel Head point sea view from near Tintagel Castle in 2008

When Gorlois goes out to fight Uther, Ygerne and her three daughters retreat to the nunnery on the headland of Tintagel, protected by the formidable abbess Bryvyth. With Merlyn's help, Uther is transformed to look like Gorlois and allowed to enter Tintagel. Morgan is frantic that she is prevented from seeing her father and spies on them. When they learn next morning that Gorlois was already dead, Bryvyth expels Ygerne in wrath. Uther claims both Bossiney and Ygerne.

When Arthur is born, Morgan demonstrates love for him, but bites his neck. Merlyn tries to win her over, but fears her as she already shows signs of magical power. On the eve of Arthur's naming day, Morgan steals the baby; she is found standing out on a rock in the stormy bay, threatening to let Arthur fall, when Uther grabs them both. Arthur is taken away in secret and Morgan is banished to Tintagel nunnery.

=== White Nun's Telling ===
The narrator is Luned, a farmer's teenage daughter, but sharp and ambitious. She once loved Morgan, but now hates her for corrupting her. Luned is converted to Christianity by Ruman, a travelling monk. She makes her way to Bryvyth's nunnery at Tintagel, but is afraid of the sea that crashes around the headland. She is disappointed to be given only physical tasks from Bryvyth, a strong but demanding abbess. After two years she is promoted to help in the library, when she witnesses the dramatic expulsion of Ygerne after Uther tricks his way into Tintagel.

When Morgan is banished to Tintagel, Luned is given charge of her. The girl proves too clever and manipulative for the nun; she dreams of becoming queen when Arthur is king. Morgan leads the younger children astray; a boy falls from the cliff and dies. Morgan joins with other nuns who secretly follow the old religion, meets with her old nurse Gwennol on the beach below Tintagel, and is taught the magic craft. In spite of herself, Luned loves Morgan and deceives Bryvyth into thinking she is winning the tussle.

When she reaches womanhood, Morgan waits desperately for a messenger to tell her she is free, but she is refused. At Samain she desecrates the chapel and leads Luned to a sexual ceremony on the beach. Unaware that she was pregnant, Luned gives birth to a baby; it is taken from her and she is expelled from Tintagel. Morgan sends her to Gwennol, where she becomes a skilled needlewoman and learns the old religion. Merlyn comes in disguise; it is he who has ordered Morgan's imprisonment. When Uther dies, Mark becomes king of Cornwall. He expels the nuns and frees Morgan; as she watches the nuns leave, Gwennol dies and Morgan recognises how much she and Bryvyth loved her.

=== Black Smith's Telling ===
The narrator is Teilo, a Cumbrian blacksmith, once powerful in the old religion. Morgan comes to Carlisle to marry young King Urien of Rheged. As she rides past, she bows to Teilo, who flees but is fascinated by her. Merlyn, in disguise, asks him to gain Morgan's confidence. Teilo is drawn to her court, but cannot get access to her. Merlyn hints at a leader in waiting who will save Britain from the Saxons; he fears Morgan. Teilo dresses as a woman and brings herbs for Morgan, who challenges him to show how he uses them. When he forces one of her maids to eat a poisonous toadstool, Morgan is furious and says she is taking away his manhood. His own wife dies of poison, and the villagers pursue him; he dresses as woman to escape, then as a hermit.

Eventually, he stumbles on the enchantress Nimue's court, where young Arthur is being raised and where his friends live. She asks his help, but hides him when Merlyn visits. He witnesses Arthur draw the sword Caliburn from the lake. Arthur rejects the offer of Teilo's services as a smith and Nimue sends Teilo back to Morgan again dressed as woman. Morgan makes him tell what he knows of Nimue and Arthur. Her flamboyant sister Margawse is there; the third sister Elaine too arrives, slow and secretive. Arthur is rising to power. The sisters go to Caerleon, where Margawse seduces him. Morgan grieves that it was not her.

After Margawse bears Arthur's child, Merlyn persuades Arthur to kill all the babies born at that time. When Arthur marries Gwenhyvar, Morgan steals his scabbard and flees. She and Teilo find Mordred fostered at a fisherman's cottage. Arthur is wounded and Morgan offers to heal him but is rejected. Nimue seizes Arthur's sword; Morgan has his scabbard of healing. Morgan makes a magnificent cloak for Arthur and Elaine poisons the silver wire, but Nimue stops him putting it on; Morgan's messenger, Luned, wears it and dies. Morgan is blamed; she casts the scabbard into the lake.

=== Taliesin's Telling ===
The narrator is Taliesin, who comes to Urien's court as bard. He is young, charming and in love with his poetic powers. Morgan takes him to her bed. Taliesin believes the young man Mordred is her son. He senses darkness there under a courteous exterior. Taliesin wants to make the great song of Britain, but Urien is getting too old for battle. Arthur visits Carlisle; there is tension between him and Morgan, the fear of poison. Morgan wants Arthur's love; he wants his scabbard back. Margawse seduces Taliesin, who learns that it is she and Arthur who are Mordred's parents.

Queen Gwenhyvar is left alone at Camelot. Taliesin steals a stained shirt of Arthur's as a keepsake for Morgan. When Gwenhyvar is kidnapped, Taliesin joins the hunt, but is lost in a bog, taken prisoner, and saved by Mordred. They rescue Gwenhyvar, who seeks sanctuary at Glastonbury Abbey. A suspicious Arthur takes her back; she denies that it was Mordred who took her. Morgan reveals to Arthur that Mordred is his son. Arthur offers peace with her; with breaking heart, she tells him not to trust Mordred.

While Arthur is away at war, Gwenhyvar divorces him and claims that it is her royalty that legitimizes Arthur; Nimue gives the sword of sovereignty to Mordred. The people acclaim Gwenhyvar high queen and Urien sends Taliesin to warn Arthur. Mordred has been welcomed as king and marries Gwenhyvar. War will give Taliesin his great song; Urien orders him to help Morgan. The sisters ride to the battle; Morgan carries Arthur's shirt. They pass the battlefield of Camlann, where Morgan forbids Taliesin to sing of it. They find Gwenhyvar sheltered at Bryvyth's nunnery with Mordred's twin sons; Morgan asks Bryvyth's blessing. Nimue visits the sisters' camp. Taliesin sees Morgan washing the blood from Arthur's shirt at night and fears she is the goddess Morrigan, taking Arthur's life. Taliesin has lost his harp and missed the battle. Urien finds him; Arthur is dead and they seek his body.

=== Herself ===
Morgan herself narrates this (the reliability of her account is left for the reader to judge). She stands in the shadows after Camlann while Arthur is dying. He still grips Caliburn; she holds the gift of life.

Morgan remembers how Uther Pendragon killed her father and came to Tintagel disguised by Merlyn to conceive Arthur on Ygerne. She falls in love with the baby and tries to take him to the Isle of Joy, but drops him in the stormy sea. Uther banishes her to Tintagel nunnery. Abbess Bryvyth and her pagan nurse Gwennol battle for her soul. King Mark frees her from Tintagel, evicts the nuns, and marries her to Urien. Margawse gives birth to Arthur's child Mordred as the sisters' instrument of revenge for their father; Arthur demands him of Morgan but she refuses and Arthur has all the babies drowned. Mordred grows up in secret and emerges to win favour. Merlyn wants Arthur to marry Gwenhyvar for her royal blood; on their wedding night, a heartbroken Morgan beds with Accolon. Morgan steals Arthur's scabbard of healing and casts it away; Nimue takes the sword. The cloak Morgan has woven for Arthur kills Luned. Morgan tells Mordred of his past. Arthur doubts Gwenhyvar after her abduction to Glastonbury Tor; Morgan tells him Mordred cannot be her lover because he is Arthur's son. Arthur rejects her attempts at reconciliation; she sleeps clutching his shirt. Mordred is left as regent and Gwenhyvar has herself crowned, but her grotesque sister Gwenhyvach comes to court and throws doubt on Gwenhyvar's royal parentage. Arthur returns to fight Mordred while Gwenhyvar hides with Bryvyth and fears for her life. Father and son parley at Camlann; a warrior treads on an adder and sends them into war. Arthur wins, killing Mordred, but takes a fatal wound.

Bedwyr pleads with Morgan to heal Arthur. Her price is Caliburn; Arthur refuses. Bedwyr tells him Morgan loves him but Arthur will not trust her. Scabbard and sword must be joined; eventually Arthur casts away the sword. The three sisters take him in their ship to Avalon.

The second narrator is a "meta" Morgan, being a character from outside the book's narrative. Woven through these chapters is her ironic commentary on the evolution of her legend. She moves from Geoffrey of Monmouth's wise ruler of Avalon, through a fairy healer and giver of magical gifts, to an evil witch and lascivious seductress in the version by Thomas Malory. She becomes Arthur's sister, and the enemy of lovers; she is the ambiguous Loathly Lady and the ominous Washer at Ford. Morgan reviews the progress of her legend through the ages, down to revisionist modern writers and even the author of this very book.

== Short stories ==
"Just Cause", the tale of Morgan and Accolon as told from Uwain's point of view, is a related short story that was published in the 1997 anthology The Chronicles of the Round Table. Another short story, "Ravens' Meat", related to The Dream of Rhonabwy, was included in the 1998 anthology The Mammoth Book of Arthurian Legends. The third of the short stories, "The Test", was published in the 2005 anthology Strange Pleasures 3, retelling the plot of Sir Gawain and the Green Knight from Morgan's perspective.

== Development ==
Fay Sampson's interest in writing about Morgan le Fay began after reading the first two chapters of Roger Lancelyn Green's 1953 King Arthur and His Knights of the Round Table, when she decided to write a novel titled Dark Sister. She recalled:

At that time I was writing largely for children and teenagers, and I had this vision of her as a teenage girl. Some of the wildness and the evil that are conventionally attributed to Morgan reminded me of girls who might be into drugs or delinquency in some form, and it was that kind of "perverted" figure, I suppose, that I was thinking of at that time. So I didn't do what I normally did, which was to tell the story from the point of view of the central character. It seemed too dark for that, and so I hit upon the idea of separate witnesses, all giving their own version of a phase of her story.

Sampson began writing Dark Sister many years before the publication of the first volume in 1989, later expanding the scope first into two, then four, and finally five books. The original project has been abandoned for about 10 years, before being picked up and revised after 1984. It was not published until she would finally decide to write it for adults. The series' original title was Dark Matter but it was rejected by publishers; as the author's note in the books says: "Morgan's story is the Dark Matter of Britain." The fifth book, Herself, was a late addition, suggested by Hutchinson.

Sampson would read Marion Zimmer Bradley's 1983 Morgan le Fay novel The Mists of Avalon only while writing the very last part of Herself, as her editor had forbidden her from doing it earlier. According to Leila K. Norako, "the descriptions of the pagan ways are far less detailed and developed (and therefore less overtly neo-pagan) in Sampson's novels than they are in Bradley's. Rather than possessing a deep contempt for Christianity as Bradley's Morgan seems to have, Sampson's Morgan deeply explores both pagan and Christian faiths in order to seek out and acquire the powers that might be found there."

As for her inspirations, Sampson said she tried to "preserve the element of healing," associated with Morgan's original named appearance in Geoffrey of Monmouth's Historia Regum Britanniae, and was least interested in the Holy Grail story in the later medieval evolution of the legend. Developing the relationship between Morgan and her sisters Margawse and Elaine, Sampson was influenced by Robert Graves and the triple goddesses of the Celtic mythology. She also credited Lucy Paton's Studies in the Fairy Mythology of Arthurian Romance as her most useful source for additional research.

Sampson said she was not "interested in the kind of feminist writing that just reverses roles, seeing Morgan as good and Arthur as bad. (...) The choice to tell it from Morgan's point of view is in itself quite a feminist approach, but there are so many schools within feminism that I would rather leave it to other people to label it as they wish than try to choose a label myself. I certainly hope it would be of interest to feminists, but whether they would agree with my treatment, I'm not sure."

Her agent proposed to include more scenes of sex and violence after the first book, Wise Woman's Telling, and she did increase the amount of sexual content but expanded on the elements of magic and religion rather than violence. The Blacksmith's Telling was the series' hardest book for her to write.

== Reception ==
Daughter of Tintagel has been well received. G.M. Magazine praised the first book, Wise Woman’s Telling, for "inject[ing] new life" into the Arthurian legend, adding that "the undercurrent of paganism has a grim and messy conviction about it, and likewise the Dark Age brutality;" by the time of the fourth book, Taliesin's Telling, G.M. has been "recommending it as ever." The Birmingham Science Fiction Group called Black Smith's Tale an "excellently written novel" but opined that it was too historically grounded to be recommended for science fiction fans. According to the 1997 Encyclopedia of Fantasy by John Grant and John Clute, the series has been Fay Simpsons's most notable achievement in adult fiction by this point; they also suggested Herself as "further reading" in the entry for Morgan Le Fay for its meta discussion of relevant literature and the transformation of the character. Grant, in his 2002 guest review in Interzone, described the series as "outstandingly different in both style and mood" than most other Arthurian stories, "well out on its own limb (and excitingly so)."

According to Professor Raymond H. Thompson, what emerges from the books "is a complex personality [of Morgan], but one that continues to fascinate, as she has done down through the ages." In 2015, Cindy Mediavilla in Arthuriana chose it as one of the few examples of literary depiction of Morgan le Fay where she "progressed from a one-dimensional evil-doer in early classic children's stories to a fully-realized heroine", alongside Bradley's The Mists of Avalon and Nancy Springer's I Am Morgan le Fay. Also writing in Arthuriana, Professor Jacqueline Jenkins included Fay Sampson among the "undeniably influential participants in the retellings of the Arthurian legends with broad audience appeal." Sampson was furthermore one of four novelists whose Arthurian works were primarily analyzed in the 2001 book Rewriting the Women of Camelot: Arthurian Popular Fiction and Feminism by Professor Ann F. Howey (the others being Bradley, Mary Stewart, and Gillian Bradshaw).

== See also ==
- Morgan le Fay in modern culture
