= Star Dancer =

Novel and tetralogy by Beth Webb

- First edition
- Author: Beth Webb
- Language: English
- Series: Star Dancer Tetralogy
- Genre: Fantasy, History
- Publisher: Macmillan Publishers
- Publication date: 2006
- Publication place: United Kingdom
- Media type: Print (Hardback & Paperback)
- Pages: 343
- ISBN: 1-4050-9175-4
- OCLC: 76797455
- Followed by: Fire Dreamer

Fire Dreamer
- Author: Beth Webb
- Language: English
- Series: Star Dancer
- Genre: Fantasy, History
- Publisher: Macmillan Publishers
- Publication date: 2007
- Publication place: United Kingdom
- Media type: Print (Hardback)
- Pages: 432 pp
- ISBN: 978-1-4050-9177-0
- OCLC: 183144223
- Preceded by: Star Dancer
- Followed by: Wave Hunter

Star Dancer is the first novel in the Star Dancer Tetralogy, written by the British author Beth Webb and published in 2006 by Macmillan Publishers. Star Dancer is a mixture of history and fantasy, suitable for teenagers and adults, based in the late Iron Age when the Romans were just beginning to invade Britain. The Daily Telegraph selected Star Dancer as a Family Book Club choice for August 2007.

Fire Dreamer is the second novel in the Star Dancer series, written by the British author Beth Webb and published in 2007 by Macmillan Publishers.

== Setting ==
The story opens in the year AD 40, and takes place in the Mendip Hills in what is now Somerset, in "an Iron Age world steeped in superstition and magic".

Star Dancer considers how Tegen, a girl with the power and qualities needed to become a Druid, copes in a world where only men are allowed to become Druids, but where Roman invasion suddenly becomes real.

== Plot ==
The druids have prophesied that the one born in the middle of an untimely meteorite shower will avert a great evil, but they are looking for a boy who will grow into a mixture of war hero and super-magician. nstead there is one baby girl, Tegen, born at the right time, and a boy, Griff, who has Down syndrome, who is born just as the stars were fading. The book explores how these two children grow up together, discovering their individual destinies, but it also shows how much they need each other to become who they were meant to be in a harsh and unforgiving world. Tegen is the Star Dancer, but she needs Griff’s honesty and kindness to stand against the druids who aren’t evil, but are fixed in their habits. Griff needs Tegen to stand against his cruel mother who abandoned him at birth. As the story unfolds, Derowen, an evil-minded ‘wise-woman’ connives with a young handsome druid who believes he should be the Star Dancer. They plot to destroy Tegen by stealing her magic, and setting her up to fail so together they can seize power. With dark spells they disturb a demon from the depths of funeral caves under the Mendip Hills and Tegen has to face her nemesis at last.

== Critical reception ==
=== Star Dancer ===
In a review for The Guardian, Kate Agnew wrote that the Iron Age setting is "vivid" and "plausibly detailed", and that despite a formula that is "hackneyed at times", the tale is compelling, raising questions "about mistrust, prejudice and gender-related expectations" that "still resonate in today's world".

Bookseller noted that Star Dancer seemed unusually realistic for a fantasy: "so convincingly and earthily rooted in real archaeological evidence about our prehistoric ancestors that you can almost smell the wood smoke, taste the mead and hear the chanting of druids." Writing in The Daily Telegraph, Christopher Middleton praised the author's depiction of early British religion, writing, "Webb creates a rich, if shaggily created textured tapestry of primitive beliefs, interweaving unfamiliar-sounding names (Gorgans, Clesek, Huval), with obscure ancient rituals (The Ogham, a divination test that makes use of stones).

Screenwriter Frank Cottrell Boyce commended the way that Webb skilfully wove in historical details, telling The Daily Telegraph, "You're left in no doubt that Beth knows her subject, but at the same time, you don't get wedges of Wikipedia or clumps of Google suddenly appearing in the middle of the text."

=== Fire Dreamer ===
The Western Daily Press in Bristol, England, wrote that Webb had set Fire Dreamer "against a firm bedrock of in-depth study into the period", resulting in "a compelling sense of credibility" that makes the reader "feel transported back in time". A review in The Bookseller called it an "expertly researched and finely tuned sequel to Star Dancer."
