= The Water Thief =

Science fiction novel by Nicholas Lamar Soutter

- First edition
- Author: Nicholas Lamar Soutter
- Language: English
- Publisher: Self-published
- Publication date: April 2012
- Publication place: United States
- Media type: Paperback, e-book

The Water Thief is a 2012 mundane science fiction novel by American writer and philosopher Nicholas Lamar Soutter about a hyper-capitalist future in which "corporations own everything, even the air we breathe".

== Plot ==
Charles Thatcher is a typical citizen in a future hyper-capitalist society. He is the property of Ackerman Brothers Securities Corporation and in this society, every commodity, even air, is sold on the market. The population is kept under control with horrific punishments delivered by a corrupt, profit-driven police service.

Given that turning in thieves of resources is incentivized with the profit motive, when Charles sees a woman steal rainwater (which is corporation property), his first thought is to call the police. Hoping to secure a larger reward, he tells authorities that she is not only a water thief; he claims she is a revolution-minded militant who is agitating for the return of the ancient system known as “government.”

She disappears, and he realizes that his creative editorializing in his report may have in fact been true. As he connects with the underground resistance, he learns more about the hyper-capitalist nature of the ruling corporations. At the same time, he even starts to wonder if the lure of profit is tempting the revolutionaries.

== Writing process ==
After reading Ayn Rand's libertarian-themed novel Atlas Shrugged, which he found to be "quite flawed". Soutter decided to rebut Rand's arguments from Atlas Shrugged by writing a novel, The Water Thief which is about a future in which "corporations own everything, even the air we breathe".

== Reception ==
In 2012 The Water Thief won a Kirkus Star from Kirkus Reviews. Kirkus Reviews called his work “[p]rofound...[and] sure to spark a reaction" and said he was "scathing, [and] ceaselessly engaging”. In 2013, the host of Blog Talk Radio, Susan Wingate, called the work a "thought-provoking novel". The 2016 edition of SFX (#277, September) calls The Water Thief an example of mundane science fiction, making the specific claim that the novel should be categorized as "Mundane SF future-history". Martha Sorren of Truthout states that Soutter "does an excellent job of building of this dystopian world and expertly connecting it to the flaws of our society today, making it easy for the reader to believe our government could morph into this corporate conglomerate if we aren’t careful."
