= Nicholas Lamar Soutter =

American writer and philosopher

Nicholas Lamar Soutter is an American writer and philosopher. His 2012 novel, The Water Thief, is about a future in which "corporations own everything, even the air we breathe." The novel won a Kirkus Star from Kirkus Reviews.

== Biography ==
=== Early years and education ===
Soutter was born in Cambridge, Massachusetts. He started writing novels when he was in high school. Despite his interest in fiction writing during his high school career, he devoted much of his attention to science courses (physics and computer science) and language studies. He also took college courses while he was in high school, including classes in astrophysics, computer science, and several languages.

At Clark University, Soutter completed bachelor's degrees in philosophy and psychology. He also qualified with a teaching certificate. He wrote one novel during his college years.

=== Writing career ===
After finishing his college studies, Soutter attempted to publish two of his works, Killdroid Rising and Inside the Mirror, but did not find any takers among publishing houses.

Eventually, the Donald Maass Literary Agency considered one of his works, but they determined that Soutter's work would face challenges with marketing, so they did not publish it. Soutter subsequently read Ayn Rand's libertarian-themed novel Atlas Shrugged, which he found to be "quite flawed." Soutter decided to rebut Rand's arguments from Atlas Shrugged by writing a novel, The Water Thief (2012), which is about a future in which "corporations own everything, even the air we breathe."

In 2012 The Water Thief won a Kirkus Star from Kirkus Reviews. Kirkus Reviews called his work “[p]rofound...[and] sure to spark a reaction" and said he was "scathing, [and] ceaselessly engaging.” In 2013, the host of Blog Talk Radio, Susan Wingate, called the work a "thought-provoking novel." The 2016 edition of SFX (#277, September) calls The Water Thief an example of mundane science fiction, making the specific claim that the novel should be categorized as "Mundane SF future-history." Martha Sorren of Truthout states that Soutter "does an excellent job of building of this dystopian world and expertly connecting it to the flaws of our society today, making it easy for the reader to believe our government could morph into this corporate conglomerate if we aren’t careful."

His other works include "The Humanist Codex" and "Confessions of a Sin Eater."

In addition to his fiction work, Soutter writes Essays on Politics and the Social Sciences and has authored a book about writing and publishing, The Business and Craft of Writing. He also works as an instructor at a workshop for fiction authors.

== Personal life ==
Soutter lives near Boston.
