= Richard Freeman (cryptozoologist) =

English cryptozoologist and author

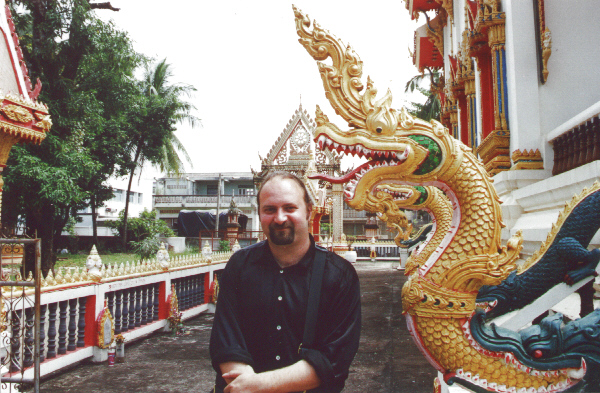
- Richard Freeman, photographed in November 2006
- Born: 1970 (age 55–56); Nuneaton, England
- Occupations: Author; Journalist; Lecturer; Cryptozoologist
- Organization: Centre for Fortean Zoology

Richard Freeman (born 1970) is a cryptozoologist, author, zoological journalist, and WebTV Presenter. He is also the zoological director of the Centre for Fortean Zoology (CFZ), and co-edits both the journal, Animals & Men and several editions of the annual CFZ Yearbook. Freeman has written, co-written, or edited a number of books, and has contributed widely to both Fortean and zoological magazines, as well as other newspapers and periodicals, including Fortean Times and Paranormal Magazine.

He has also lectured across the UK at events such as the Fortean Times Unconvention, the Weird Weekend, Microcon and at museums and universities such as the Natural History Museum, the Grant Museum of Zoology, Queen Mary, University of London and the Last Tuesday Society.

Richard claims an early obsession with the classic science fiction series Doctor Who (with Jon Pertwee) had sparked an interest in all things weird. He studied zoology at Leeds University. After school, he became a zoo keeper at Twycross Zoo in Leicestershire and became head keeper of reptiles, working with more than 400 exotic species from ants to elephants (but with a special interest in crocodilians). After leaving the zoo, he worked in an exotic pet shop, a reptile rescue centre, and as a gravedigger.

Whilst on holiday he learned of the CFZ and bought a copy of the Centre's journal, Animals & Men, which left him impressed enough to subscribe and begin contributing. He eventually became the CFZ's Yorkshire representative, then moved to Devon to become a full-time member of the Centre. He is now the zoological director and co-editor of Animals & Men.

== Cryptozoological expeditions ==
- Thailand in 2000 for a species of a giant crested snake known as the naga.
- Sumatra, Indonesia in 2003 and 2004 for an upright walking non-human ape called orang-pendek.
- Mongolia in 2005 for the Mongolian death worm.
- The Gambia in 2006 for a dragon-like aquatic cryptid, the Ninki Nanka.
- Guyana in 2007 for the giant anaconda, the di-di (a yeti-like hominid), the water tiger (a spotted semi-aquatic, flesh eating mammal), and the bushmen, an unrecorded race of three-foot pygmies with red faces. He also heard of what may be a new species of tiny caiman with a red strip running along its back.
- Kabardino-Balkaria, Russia in 2008 for the almasty, a relic hominid.
- Sumatra again in 2009 for the orang-pendek.
- India in 2010 for the Mande-Barung or Indian yeti.
- Sumatra again in 2011 and 2013 for the orang-pendek.
- Tasmania in 2013, 2016, and 2017 for the thylacine or Tasmanian Wolf
- Tajikistan in 2018 for the gul, a creature akin to the Russian almasty. And the Caspian tiger.
- Sumatra in 2022 for the orang-pendek.
- Tajikistan in 2023 for the gul and the Caspian tiger.
- Tajikistan in 2024 for the gul and the Caspian tiger.
- Bhitarkanika national park, India in 2025 for 'Kalia' a giant saltwater crocodile.
- Lake Storsjön, Sweden in 2026 for the Storsjöodjuret or Great Lake Serpent.

=== Creatures hunted ===
- The Monster of Martin Mere, an 8-foot, swan-eating catfish in Lancashire.
- The Loch Ness Monster
- The Monster of Loch Morar
- The Monster of Windermere

== Books ==
- Weird Devon (Bossiney, Padstow, 1999) with Jonathan Downes and Graham Inglis
- Dragons: More Than a Myth? (CFZ Press, Bideford, 2005)
- Explore Dragons (Heart of Albion Press, Loughborough, 2006)
- The Great Yokai Encyclopedia; an A to Z of Japanese Monsters (CFZ Press, Bideford, 2010)
- Orang-pendek: Sumatra's Forgotten Ape (CFZ Press, Bideford, 2011) ISBN 978-1905723829
- Green Unpleasant Land; 18 stories of British Horror (CFZ Press, Bideford, 2012) ISBN 978-1905723850
- Hyakumonogatari: Tales of Japanese Horror (CFZ Press, Bideford, 2012)
- Adventures in Cryptozology: Hunting for Yetis Mongolian Deathworms and Other Not-So-Mythical Monsters (Mango Publishing, Florida 2019) ISBN 978-1642500165
- In Search of Real Monsters: Adventures in Cryptozology Volume Two (Mango Publishing, Florida 2022 )
- " Creatures That Eat People"(Mango Publishing, Florida 2024 )
- " 'The Highest Strangeness'" (CFZ Press 2024)

== Appearances in media ==
Penn & Teller: Bullshit! – Season 4 Episode 1: Cryptozoology
