= Fay Sampson =

UK speculative fiction writer

- Born: 10 June 1935 (age 91); Plymouth, Devon, England, UK
- Occupation: Writer
- Writing career
- Period: 1975–present
- Genre: fantasy

Fay Sampson (born 10 June 1935) is a British writer of speculative fiction, predominantly known for the Daughter of Tintagel, Pangur Ban, and Sorcerer fiction series.

== Biography ==
Sampson earned a degree in mathematics in 1956 from the University College of the South West of England, now the University of Exeter. She taught at two English high schools, one in Mytholmroyd (1957–1958), and the other in Nottingham (1959–1960). She and her husband lived for a time in Rhodesia, where she ran a college library in Serenje from 1962 to 1964. After Rhodesia's independence and transition to Zambia, she moved back to Devon, and began writing children's novels.

== Writings ==
Sampson has written the Pangur Bán stories, a series beginning with Pangur Ban, the White Cat (1983). The Pangur Bán books are a series of Celtic fantasy novels set in medieval Ireland, and aimed at children. The Pangur Bán novels are based on the Old Irish poem, Pangur Bán. The Pangur Bán novels also feature talking animals, mermaids and magicians.

Sampson then produced the Daughter of Tintagel series of Arthurian historical fantasy novels based on Morgan le Fay. This series began with Wise Woman's Telling (1989) and describes the life of Morgan through the eyes of people who encounter her.

Sampson's Star Dancer (1993) is a singleton fantasy novel based on the Sumerian myth of Inanna and Ereshkigal.

== Select bibliography ==
=== Daughter of Tintagel ===
- Wise Woman's Telling (1989)
- White Nun's Telling (1989)
- Black Smith's Telling (1990)
- Taliesin's Telling (1991)
- Herself (1992)

=== Pangur Ban ===
- Pangur Ban, the White Cat (1983)
- Finnglas of the Horses (1985)
- Finnglas and the Stones of Choosing (1986)
- Shape Shifter - The Naming of Pangur Ban (1988)
- The Serpent of Senargad (1989)
- The White Horse Is Running (1990)

=== Sorcerer ===
- The Sorcerer's Trap (2005)
- The Sorcerer's Daughter (2007)

=== Standalone novels ===
- F.67 (1975)
- The Watch on Patterick Fell (1978)
- The Chains of Sleep (1981)
- Star Dancer (1993)
- Them (2003)
