= The Unconquered Country: A Life History =

1986 novel by Geoff Ryman

The Unconquered Country: A Life History is a novel by Geoff Ryman published in 1986.

== Plot summary ==
The Unconquered Country: A Life History is a novel in which a fully organic civilization is torn apart because of political upheavals.

== Reception ==
Dave Langford reviewed The Unconquered Country: A Life History for White Dwarf #83, and stated that "It packs a terrific punch. In its shorter Interzone form, it won two major awards. Sacha Ackerman's many line drawings work well with the text."

== Reviews ==
- Review by Faren Miller (1986) in Locus, #306 July 1986
- Review by Brian Stableford (1986) in Fantasy Review, September 1986
- Review by Maureen Porter (1986) in Vector 135
- Review by Don D'Ammassa (1986) in Science Fiction Chronicle, #87 December 1986
- Review by Andrew M. Andrews (1987) in Thrust, #28, Fall 1987
- Review by David Pringle (1988) in Modern Fantasy: The Hundred Best Novels
