= The Child Garden =

1989 novel by Geoff Ryman

- Cover of first edition (hardcover)
- Author: Geoff Ryman
- Language: English
- Genre: Science fiction
- Publisher: Unwin Hyman (U.K.); St. Martin's Press (U.S.)
- Publication date: 1989
- Publication place: United Kingdom
- Media type: Print (Hardcover & Paperback)
- Pages: 389
- ISBN: 0-04-440393-3
- OCLC: 20016163

The Child Garden is a 1989 science fiction novel by Canadian writer Geoff Ryman.

The novel is structured as two books with a brief introduction. The first book was originally published in two parts as "Love Sickness" in the Summer and Autumn 1987 editions of the British science fiction magazine Interzone.

== Synopsis ==
In a future semitropical England cancer has been cured, but, as a result, the human lifespan has been halved and socialism has replaced capitalism. It is a world transformed by global warming and by advances in genetic engineering. Houses, machines, even spaceships are genetically-engineered life-forms.

Milena, an actress, secretly has an immunity to the viruses routinely used to educate people. She attempts to use holograms to stage an opera based on Dante's The Divine Comedy. The opera is written by her genetically modified friend Rolfa. As she works on the opera she encounters the ruling body of the world, called the Consensus, an artificial hive mind made up of the mental patterns of billions of children. Milena slowly discovers that this gestalt consciousness is lonely and afraid of dying and it looks to Milena as a form of salvation.

== Reception ==
The Child Garden won the Arthur C. Clarke Award and the John W. Campbell Memorial Award in 1990, and the 1988 BFSA Award. It placed 8th in the Locus Award for Best Novella.

Jo Walton called it a "masterpiece", and said that it should have been a finalist for the Hugo Award for Best Novel.

== See also ==
- Geoff Ryman bibliography
- List of science fiction novels
