= Åcon =

Annual science fiction convention in Mariehamn, Åland, Finland

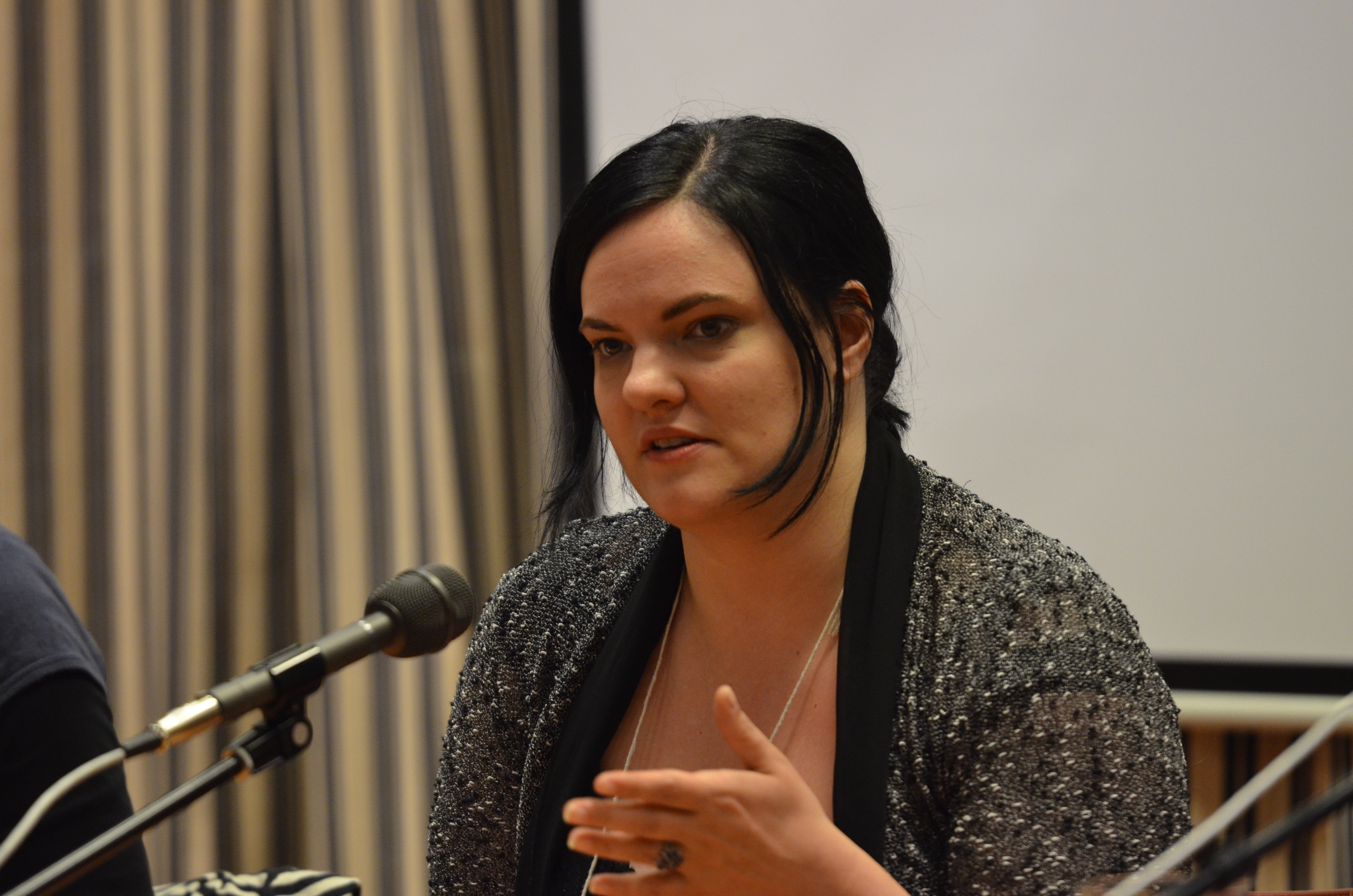
- Guest of Honour Catherynne M. Valente at Åcon 2012.
- Status: active
- Genre: Science fiction, fantasy
- Frequency: Annual
- Venue: 60.09489°N 19.92825°E
- Locations: Mariehamn, Åland
- Country: Finland
- Previous event: Åcon 14
- Next event: Åcon 15

Åcon is an annual science fiction convention, held in May or June every year in Mariehamn, Åland. It was founded in 2007 with the goal of bringing Swedish and Finnish science fiction fandom together, and described as being a literary relaxacon with all programming in English. While a few of the participants are Ålanders, the majority travel from mainland Finland and Sweden for the convention.

== Guests of honour ==
	Year	Guest of Honour
1	2007	Hal Duncan
2	2008	Ian McDonald
3	2009	Steph Swainston
4	2010	Geoff Ryman
5	2012	Cat Valente
6	2013	Tricia Sullivan
7	2014	Karen Lord
8	2016	Zen Cho
9	2018	Emma Newman
10	2019	Amal El-Mohtar
11	2022	No Guest of Honour
12	2023	No Guest of Honour
13	2024	Fiona Barnett
14	2026	Emily Tesh
