= What We Found (short story) =

2011 science fiction novelette by Geoff Ryman

- Author: Geoff Ryman
- Language: English
- Publication date: 2011

"What We Found" is a science fiction novelette by Geoff Ryman, first published in 2011, in The Magazine of Fantasy & Science Fiction. It won the 2012 Nebula Award for Best Novelette, and was nominated for the 2012 Hugo Award for Best Novelette. It was included in The Year's Best Science Fiction: Twenty-Ninth Annual Collection by Gardner Dozois.

== Plot synopsis ==
A Nigerian scientist tells the story of his abusive childhood in a family torn by lies and mental illness, and of how this led him to become a scientist who made a discovery that will change the world.
