= Christopher Cokinos =

American poet and writer

- Born: 1963 (age 62–63); Indianapolis, Indiana, U.S.
- Education: Indiana University Bloomington (BA); Washington University in St. Louis (MFA)
- Occupations: Poet; writer
- Partner: Kathe Lison
- Writing career
- Genre: Non-fiction
- Notable awards: Whiting Award (2003)
- Website: www.christophercokinos.com

Christopher Cokinos (born 1963) is an American poet and writer of nonfiction on nature and the environment.

Born in 1963 in Indianapolis, Indiana, he studied at Indiana University at Bloomington (BA 1981) and at Washington University in St. Louis (MFA 1991). He taught at Kansas State University from 1991 to 2002. He also served as president of the Kansas Audubon Council from 1996 to 1998 and in a similar capacity for Utah Audubon. After nine years at USU, in May 2011 he left Utah State University, where he taught for nine years and founded and edited Isotope: A Journal of Literary Nature and Science Writing. From 2011 to 2023, he taught in the MFA program at the University of Arizona and as a member of the Institute of the Environment.

In 2003, he was one of 10 national recipients of the Whiting Award, given annually to emerging writers of exceptional talent and promise. He is also the winner of the Sigurd Olson Nature Writing Award, the Fine-Line Prize for Lyric Prose (from Mid-American Review), and the Glasgow Prize for an Emerging Writing of Nonfiction. His poetry book The Underneath won the New American Press Prize. He has been a fellow of the Rachel Carson Institute in Munich. He was the winner of a Graduate and Professional Student Council Mentor of the Year at Arizona and a Biosphere 2 Innovative Faculty Fellowship.

Cokinos is the winner of fellowships and grants from the American Antiquarian Society, the Utah Arts Council, and the National Science Foundation. In 2003–2004 he was a member of the Antarctic Search for Meteorites expedition for five weeks, as part of his research for The Fallen Sky: An Intimate History of Shooting Stars.

His essays, poems and reviews have appeared in the New York Times, the Los Angeles Times, the Iowa Review, Shenandoah, High Country News, Ecotone, Orion, Poetry, Western Humanities Review, and Science, among many other venues. Now retired, he continues to contribute essays to the Los Angeles Times and covers NASA and other topics for Astronomy magazine, among other publications.

Cokinos has been an analog astronaut at the Mars Desert Research Station and is leading an all-artists lunar surface analog at the Space Analog for Moon and Mars at Biosphere 2.

Cokinos lives in Logan, Utah, with his partner, the writer Kathe Lison.

== Bibliography ==
=== Non fiction ===
- Hope Is the Thing with Feathers: A Personal Chronicle of Vanished Birds, nonfiction (New York: Tarcher, 2000; Warner, 2001; Tarcher/Penguin, 2009, revised.)
- The Fallen Sky: An Intimate History of Shooting Stars, (New York: Tarcher/Penguin, 2009).
- Bodies, of the Holocene: Essays, (Truman State University Press, 2013).
- Still as Bright: An Illuminating History of the Moon from Antiquity to Tomorrow , (New York: Pegasus Books, 2024)

=== Poetry collections ===
- Killing Seasons , (Topeka: Woodley Press, 1993)
- Held as Earth , (Finishing Line, 2014)
- The "Underneath , (New American Press, 2018)

=== Anthologies ===
- The Sonoran Desert: A Literary Field Guide , with Eric Magrane (University of Arizona Press, 2016)
- Beyond Earth's Edge: The Poetry of Spaceflight , with Julie Swarstad Johnson (University of Arizona Press, 2019)

== Sources ==
Contemporary Authors Online. The Gale Group, 2007. PEN (Permanent Entry Number): 0000134622. www.christophercokinos.com
