= The Warrior Who Carried Life =

Novel by Geoff Ryman

The Warrior Who Carried Life is a fantasy novel by Canadian writer Geoff Ryman, published in 1985.

== Plot summary ==
It is the story of Cara, who learns witchcraft to get revenge on the Galu.

== Reception ==
Dave Langford reviewed The Warrior Who Carried Life for White Dwarf #66, and stated that "For the climax Ryman goes for broke; a sad and gentle coda saves his theme from the common fault of being too big to care about. There are glitches (the appalling poetry of the Secret Rose crashes to I earth when verbalized as 'Humanity was in danger of being replaced'), but Ryman is an author to watch."

Colin Greenland reviewed The Warrior Who Carried Life for Imagine magazine, and stated that "Ryman draws on folklore other authors have forgotten, to create a dark fantasy at once familiar and deeply strange. Cara's quest through hell for vengeance on inhuman invaders has the clarity and conviction of a good nightmare. Geoff Ryman is the most gifted of new British fantasy writers by far."

== Reviews ==
- Review by Brian Stableford (1985) in Fantasy Review, June 1985
- Review by Faren Miller (1985) in Locus, #294 July 1985
- Review by Mike Dickinson (1985) in Vector 127
- Review by Gregory Feeley (1985) in Foundation, #35 Winter 1985/1986, (1986)
- Review by Mary Gentle (1985) in Interzone, #12 Summer 1985
- Review by Orson Scott Card (1987) in The Magazine of Fantasy & Science Fiction, July 1987
- Review by Tom Easton (1987) in Analog Science Fiction/Science Fact, August 1987
- Review by Darrell Schweitzer (1989) in Aboriginal Science Fiction, January–February 1989
- Review by Matt Hilliard (2013) in Strange Horizons, 22 July 2013
