= 253 (novel) =

1996 novel by Geoff Ryman

- First edition (UK)
- Author: Geoff Ryman
- Cover artist: Nic Mead
- Language: English
- Genre: Novel
- Publisher: Flamingo (UK); St. Martin's Press
- Publication date: February 1998
- Publication place: United Kingdom
- Media type: Print (Paperback)
- Pages: 366 pp (first edition, hardcover)
- ISBN: 0-00-655078-9 (first edition, Paperback)

253, or Tube Theatre, is a novel by Canadian writer Geoff Ryman, originally created as a website in 1997, then published as a print book titled 253: The Print Remix in 1998. The print version won a Philip K. Dick Award.

== Synopsis ==
253 is about the 253 people on a London Underground train travelling between Embankment station and Elephant & Castle on January 11, 1995, the day Ryman learned that his best friend had AIDS and would soon die. As Carmen Maria Machado notes, "Rather than being a bit of trivia, this revelation reinforces 253’s emotional project: the demonstration of the desire to slow down the movement toward grief, to replay the moments before the end over and over again to hold off the heartbreak." The basic structure of the novel is explained in the foreword:

There are seven carriages on a Bakerloo Line train, each with 36 seats. A train in which every passenger has a seat will carry 252 people. With the driver, that makes 253.

Each character is introduced in a separate section containing 253 words, which give general details and describe the thoughts going through the characters' heads. In the online version, hypertext links lead to other characters who are nearby or who have some connection to the current character; in the print version, the links are partly replaced by a traditional index. The reader can proceed from one character to another using these devices or can read the novel in positional order, e.g. from one seat and one train car to the next, but there is no overall chronological order except in the final section.

The novel ends with the train crashing.

== Influences and interpretations ==
Ryman, already a novelist, became interested in electronic literature and hypertext fiction from Kathryn Cramer's article in the New York Review of Science Fiction.

Ryman states that the meaning of 253 is dramatically changed when read in digital form as opposed to print form. In reading 253 on the internet the links between passengers create and emphasize existing similarities between the passengers. It becomes a text about how intrinsically similar people are. Whereas, in print form 253 is about how different people are. A lack of links between passengers means that the reader must traverse the story linearly, thereby emphasizing the differences between passengers.

== Reception ==
Charles de Lint gave the print edition a mixed review, declaring: "Is it worth reading? Definitely. Is it the fiction of the future? I hope not. As a one-off, it's entertaining, and even thought-provoking, but it took me a long time to read, simply because I kept setting it aside after every half-dozen or so entries to read something with a more coherent narrative. Call me old-fashioned, but I doubt I'd try another." NPR's Mary Glendinning reviewed the print version more favourably as "Gimmicky? Perhaps. Funny, sharp and sad? Yes. Entertaining? Definitely."

The Guardian noted that this work "grew out of a website in the frontier days of internet storytelling."

== See also ==
- Constrained writing
- Electronic literature
- Hypertext fiction
- Life: A User's Manual, a similarly constructed novel by Georges Perec, based on an apartment building rather than an underground train
- List of London Underground-related fiction
