= Was (novel) =

1992 novel by Geoff Ryman

- First edition
- Author: Geoff Ryman
- Cover artist: Thomi Wroblewski
- Language: English
- Publisher: HarperCollins
- Publication date: 1 May 1992
- Publication place: UK
- Media type: Print (hardback & paperback)
- Pages: 352 pp (hardcover edition) & 368 pp (paperback edition)
- ISBN: 978-0-00-223931-8 (hardcover edition)
- OCLC: 26301503

Was (or Was... in the UK edition) is a WFA–nominated 1992 novel by Canadian author Geoff Ryman, published by HarperCollins, focusing on themes of L. Frank Baum's 1900 novel The Wonderful Wizard of Oz, and the 1939 musical film version, ranging across time and space from 1860s Kansas to late 1980s California. The story follows three main characters, each living in a different time period, whose individual journeys all connect to the story of The Wizard of Oz.

== Plot summary ==
Told in alternating, non-chronological chapters, the novel is separated into three parts: "Winter Kitchen", "Summer Kitchen", and "Oz Circle". The story follows three characters, each connected to the story of The Wizard of Oz, and how they are all connected to one another without even realizing it.

The primary focus is on Jonathan, a gay actor with AIDS who goes on a obsessed pilgrimage of sorts to Manhattan, Kansas, in search of the "real" Dorothy.

Other portions of the novel explore the tragic life of "Dorothy Gael" in 1800s Kansas, whose traumatic experiences with Aunt Emily and Uncle Henry after her mother's death leads her to create an imaginary and idealized world in her mind based on some of her real-life experiences as a way of coping with her bleak reality. Unlike Baum's fairy tale book, she never gets to experience the magic of Oz, thus turning her into an insane and bitter old woman. L. Frank Baum himself makes an appearance as a substitute teacher in Kansas who meets Dorothy, and is so inspired and touched by their encounter, he decides to make her the main character of his classic fantasy novel.

Finally, the book explores the life of Judy Garland as she plays Dorothy Gale in the 1939 movie.

== Themes ==
Was has been described as more somber than Baum's The Wizard of Oz, and an attempt to correct the deceptive fantasy of that work, illuminating the realistic implications of having a fantasy world to retreat to. It has also been called a critique of American society.

== Reception ==
Was is listed in The Gay Canon as one of the great books that every gay man should read. The Publishing Triangle named the book number 79 on its list of best gay and lesbian novels, and it was republished as a part of Orion's Masterworks series.

== Awards and nominations ==
- Finalist for the World Fantasy Award, 1993
- Shortlisted for the Locus Award for Best Fantasy Novel, 1993
- Inducted into the Gaylactic Spectrum Awards Hall of Fame, 2002

== Musical adaptation ==
A musical production of the book, sponsored by the American Musical Theatre Project, premiered at the Ethel M. Barber Theatre at Northwestern University in October 2005. It was directed by Tina Landau, with libretto and lyrics by Barry Kleinbort, and music by Joseph Thalken.

An earlier version of the musical appeared at the Human Race Theatre in Dayton, Ohio.
