= Beth Webb =

British children's author

Beth Webb is a British author of books for children and teenagers. She has written fifteen books, including the Star Dancer tetralogy, a fantasy series published by Macmillan, as well as the Fleabag Trilogy. She is also the co-founder of Books Beyond Words, and has illustrated more than twenty titles for adults with learning disabilities. She lives in Somerset, near Glastonbury Tor.

== Early life and education ==
Webb was born near Hampton Court Palace and grew up in Farnborough, Hampshire. She started writing as a teenager, with her first story published in a magazine when she was fourteen years old. She studied sociology and psychology at university, and traveled around Europe for three years, at one point living in a houseboat in Amsterdam. After returning to the UK, she worked in London as a journalist and radio broadcaster, and later moved to Somerset, where she earned an MFA in creative writing from Bath Spa University.

== Career ==
=== Illustrator ===
Since founding Books Beyond Words with Sheila Hollins in 1989, Webb has illustrated more than 20 titles for the series, which features wordless picture stories covering difficult life events. As the artist for the book Getting On With Cancer (2002), Webb was closely involved in the development process, working with an editorial committee including advisers with learning disabilities, clinicians, and health services representatives, as well as trial readers. In 2005, Learning Disability Practice commended her "simply drawn and carefully crafted illustrations" in the books When Dad Died and When Mum Died.

=== Writer ===
Webb has taught creative writing to young people since 1990, in schools and in workshops for ages eight up to 80 years old. She dedicated her book Star Dancer to the "Kilvites", a group of young writers who attended her creative writing course at the Kilve Court Residential Educational Centre.

Over the years, she has written books for children across different age groups, including six- to eight year olds, older children, and teens. Her four-book series starting with Star Dancer, published by Macmillan in 2006, was her first major commercial success. For the Star Dancer series, she did extensive research into British folklore, archaeology, and history.

She has also worked as a performance storyteller.

Webb was a guest of honour at the science-fiction convention ArmadaCon in 2023.

== Bibliography ==
- Disbelieved (2018)
- Stone Keeper (2013)
- Wave Hunter (2008)
- Fire Dreamer (2007)
- Junkyard Dragon (2007)
- Star Dancer (2006)
- The Dragons of Kilve (2004, 2nd Edition)
- Boo Hoo the Ogre (2003)
- Fleabag and the Ring's End (2000)
- Wanted: One Dragon (1999)
- Fleabag and the Fire Cat (1997)
- The Witch of Wookey Hole (1997)
- Foxdown Wood (1997)
- Fleabag and the Ring Fire (1995)
- The Magic in the Pool of Making (1992)
