= Air (novel) =

2005 novel by Geoff Ryman

Air: Or, Have Not Have
- First edition cover
- Author: Geoff Ryman
- Language: English
- Genre: Science fiction novel
- Publisher: St. Martin's Griffin
- Publication date: October 2004
- Publication place: United Kingdom
- Media type: Print (Paperback & Hardback)
- Pages: 400 pp (first edition, paperback)
- ISBN: 0-312-26121-7 (first edition, paperback)
- OCLC: 49352058

Air, also known as Air: Or, Have Not Have, is a 2005 novel by Geoff Ryman. It won the British Science Fiction Association Award, the James Tiptree, Jr. Award, and the Arthur C. Clarke Award, and was on the short list for the Philip K. Dick Award in 2004, the Nebula Award in 2005, and the John W. Campbell Memorial Award in 2006.

Ryman initially wrote a short story for The Magazine of Fantasy & Science Fiction entitled "Have Not Have", which was included in the April 2001 edition (later reprinted in the June 2014 issue of Clarkesworld Magazine). This was expanded into a novel initially titled Air: Or, Have Not Have, and renamed to just Air in all editions since the first.

== Plot introduction ==
Air is the story of a town's fashion expert Chung Mae, a smart but illiterate peasant woman in a small village in the fictional country of Karzistan (loosely based on the country of Kazakhstan), and her suddenly leading role in reaction to dramatic, worldwide experiments with a new information technology called Air. Air is information exchange, not unlike the Internet, that occurs in everyone's brain and is intended to connect the world. After a test of Air is imposed on Mae's unprepared mountain town, everyone and everything changes, especially Mae who was deeper into Air than any other person. Afterwards, Mae struggles to prepare her people for what is to come while learning all about the world outside her home.

== Reception ==
F&SF reviewer Robert. K. J. Killheffer praised Ryman's "humane insight and sympathy" and "incisive meditations on the process of social and cultural change," concluding that the novel is "not merely powerful, thought-provoking, and profoundly moving, but indispensable."

== Release details ==
- 2004, UK, St. Martin's Griffin (ISBN 0-312-26121-7), Pub date ? October 2004, paperback (First edition)
- 2005, UK, Gollancz (ISBN 0-575-07697-6), Pub date 21 July 2005, hardback
- 2005, UK, Gollancz (ISBN 0-575-07811-1), Pub date 14 September 2006, paperback
