= Geoff Ryman =

Canadian writer of science fiction, fantasy, slipstream and historical fiction

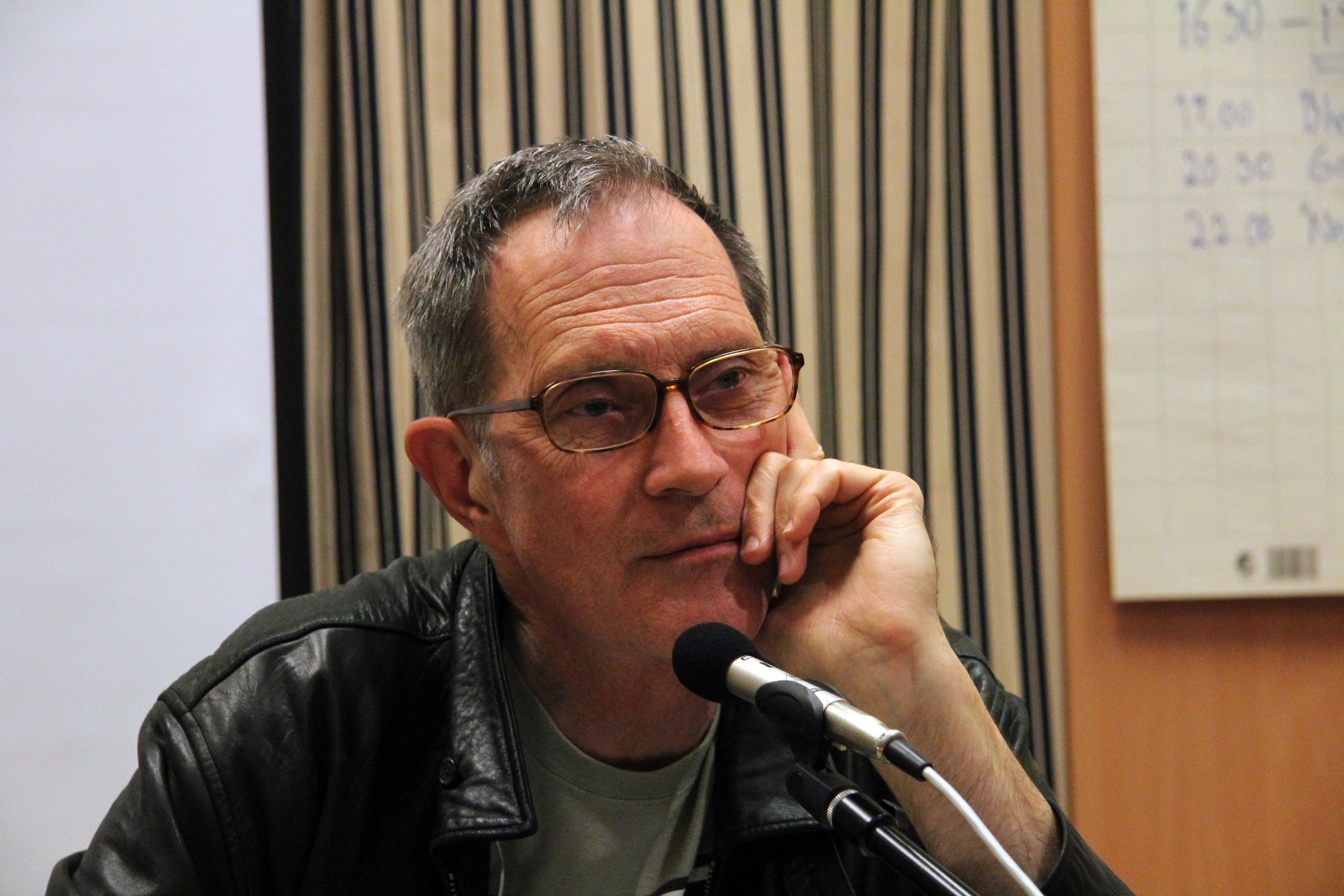
- Ryman at Åcon 2010.
- Born: Geoffrey Charles Ryman; 1951 (age 74–75); Canada
- Occupations: Author, actor, teacher
- Writing career
- Genres: Science fiction, fantasy, historical fiction, LGBT literature
- Notable works: The Child Garden; Was; Air
- Literary movement: Mundane science fiction

Geoffrey Charles Ryman (born 1951) is a Canadian writer of science fiction, fantasy, slipstream and historical fiction. Ryman has written and published seven novels, including an early example of a hypertext novel, 253. He has won multiple awards, including the World Fantasy Award.

== Biography ==
Ryman was born in Canada and moved to the United States at age 11. He earned degrees in History and English at UCLA, then moved to England in 1973, where he has lived most of his life. He is gay.

In addition to being an author, Ryman started a web design team for the UK government at the Central Office of Information in 1994. He also led the teams that designed the first official British Monarchy and 10 Downing Street websites, and worked on the UK government's flagship website, www.direct.gov.uk.

== Works ==
Ryman says he knew he was a writer "before [he] could talk", with his first work published in his mother's newspaper column at six years of age. He is best known for his science fiction; however, his first novel was the fantasy The Warrior Who Carried Life (1985), and his revisionist fantasy of The Wizard of Oz, Was... (1992), has been called "his most accomplished work".

In 1996, Ryman began publishing instalments of 253: A Novel for the Internet in Seven Cars and a Crash on the web. The work deals with the interconnected lives of 253 people on a Bakerloo line train in London, hurtling towards death, and is an early example of a hypertext novel. It was deeply personal to Ryman. '253 happens on January 11th, 1995,' he writes, 'which is the day I learned my best friend was dying of Aids.' The project was intricate and lengthy, and took up a great deal of time, but in the 2000s, when Ryman was suffering from cancer, he accidentally failed to renew the URL, which was sold on, resulting in the loss of the project. In 2023, however, Ryman was able to restore it, and it became available online again.

Much of Ryman's work is based on travels to Cambodia. The first of these, The Unconquered Country (1986), was winner of the World Fantasy Award and BSFA Award. His novel The King's Last Song (2006) was set both in the Angkor Wat era and the time after Pol Pot and the Khmer Rouge.

In 2023, after a significant hiatus between novels, Ryman published Him, an alternative history of Jesus Christ, in which Jesus is born biologically female, but identifies as male. New Scientist called it 'provocative,' while Lisa Tuttle commented in The Guardian: 'It will offend those determined to be offended, but it is a serious, heartfelt exploration of profound human questions by one of our best writers.'

Ryman has written, directed and performed in several plays based on works by other writers.

He was guest of honour at Novacon in 1989 and has twice been a guest speaker at Microcon, in 1994 and in 2004. He was also the guest of honour at the national Swedish science fiction convention Swecon in 2006, at Gaylaxicon 2008, at Wiscon 2009, and at Åcon 2010. An article by Wendy Gay Pearson on Ryman's novel The Child Garden won the British Science Fiction Foundation's graduate essay award and was published in a special issue of Foundation on LGBT science fiction edited by Andrew M. Butler in 2002. Ryman's works were also the subject of a special issue of Extrapolation in 2008, with articles dealing with Air, The Child Garden, Lust, and Was, in particular. Neil Easterbrook's article in this special issue, "'Giving An Account of Oneself': Ethics, Alterity, Air" won the 2009 Science Fiction Research Association Pioneer Award for best published article on science fiction (this award has since been renamed the SFRA Innovative Research Award). The issue includes an interview with Geoff Ryman by Canadian speculative fiction writer Hiromi Goto. The introduction to the special issue, by Susan Knabe and Wendy Gay Pearson, also responds to Ryman's call for Mundane science fiction.

The Mundane SF movement was founded in 2002 during the Clarion Workshop by Ryman and other Clarion West Workshop instructors. In a 2004 manifesto on the subject, Ryman writes of the Mundane science fiction movement: 'This movement proposes "mundane science fiction" as its own subgenre science fiction, typically characterized by its setting on Earth and a believable use of technology and science as it exists at the time the story is written or a plausible extension of existing technology.'

In 2008 a Mundane SF issue of Interzone magazine was published, guest-edited by Ryman, Julian Todd and Trent Walters.

Ryman has lectured at the University of Manchester since at least 2007; as of 2022 he is an Honorary Senior Lecturer in Creative Writing for University of Manchester's English Department, where in 2011 he won the Faculty Students' Teaching Award for the School of Arts, History and Culture.

== Partial bibliography ==
=== Novels ===
- The Unconquered Country: A Life History (1984)
- The Warrior Who Carried Life (1985)
- The Child Garden (1989)
- Was (1992)
- 253 (1996 online, 1998 print)
- Lust (2001)
- Air: Or, Have Not Have (2005)
- The King's Last Song (2006 UK, 2008 US)
- Him (2023)
- Animals (2025)

=== Collections ===
- Unconquered Countries: Four Novellas (1994)
- Paradise Tales (July 2011, Small Beer Press)

== Awards ==
British Science Fiction Award

- The Unconquered Country for Best Short (1984)
- Air for Best Novel (2005)

World Fantasy Award

- The Unconquered Country Best Novella (1985)

Arthur C. Clarke Award

- The Child Garden for Best Novel (1990)
- Air (2005)

Campbell Award

- The Child Garden for Best Novel (1990)

Philip K. Dick Award

- 253: The Print Remix, 1998

James Tiptree, Jr. Award

- Air (2005)

Nebula Award for Best Novelette

- What We Found (2012)
