= 77th World Science Fiction Convention =

77th Worldcon (2019)

Dublin 2019, the 77th World Science Fiction Convention
- Genre: Science fiction
- Dates: 15–19 August 2019
- Venue: Convention Centre Dublin and The Point Square, Dublin
- Location: Dublin
- Coordinates: 53°20′53.412″N 6°14′21.561″W
- Country: Ireland
- Organizer: James Bacon (Chair)
- Website: dublin2019.com

The 77th World Science Fiction Convention (Worldcon), also known as Dublin 2019—An Irish Worldcon, was held on 15–19 August 2019 at the Convention Centre, as well as in The Point Square, Dublin, Ireland.

The convention chair was James Bacon.

== Participants ==
Attendance was 6,525, out of 8,430 paid memberships.

=== Guests of Honour ===
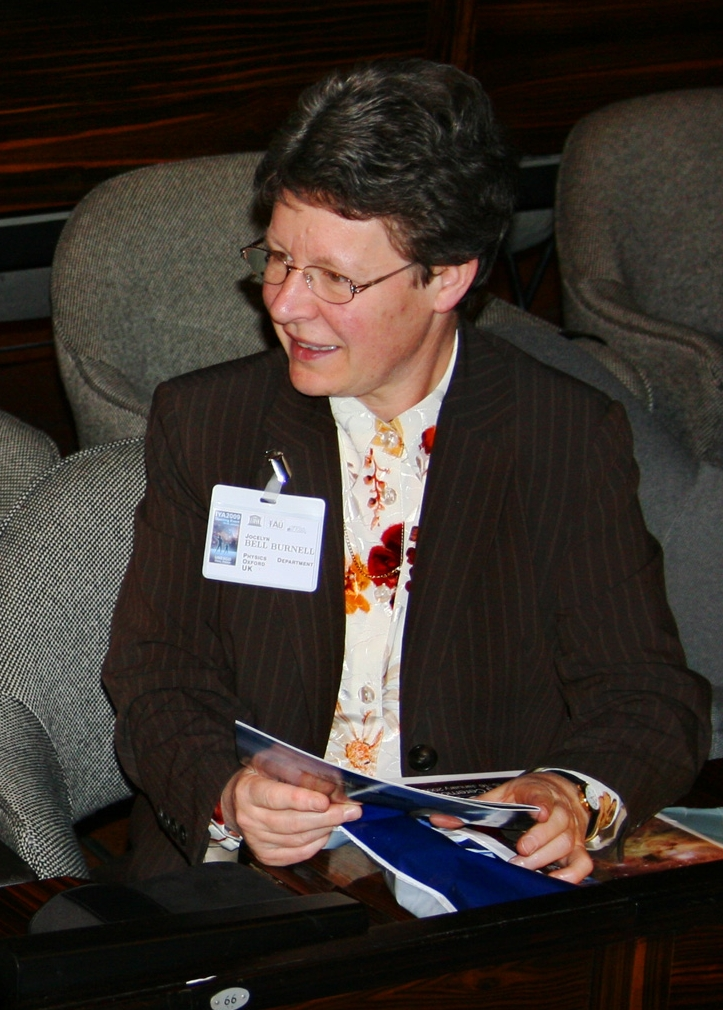
One of the Guests of Honour, Dame Jocelyn Bell Burnell.

- academic Jocelyn Bell Burnell
- editor Ginjer Buchanan
- fans Mary and Bill Burns
- author Diane Duane
- game designer Steve Jackson
- author Ian McDonald

=== Special Guests ===
- engineer and astronaut Jeanette Epps
- engineer and astronaut-candidate Norah Patten

=== Featured artists ===
- comics and graphic novel artist Afua Richardson
- Celtic tradition artist Jim Fitzpatrick
- multimedia artist Maeve Clancy
- comics and graphic novel artist Sana Takeda

=== Other notable participants ===
In addition to several Guests of Honour, a number of Featured Artists appeared on the convention programme: Jim Fitzpatrick, Maeve Clancy, Afua Richardson and Sana Takeda.

== Programming and events ==
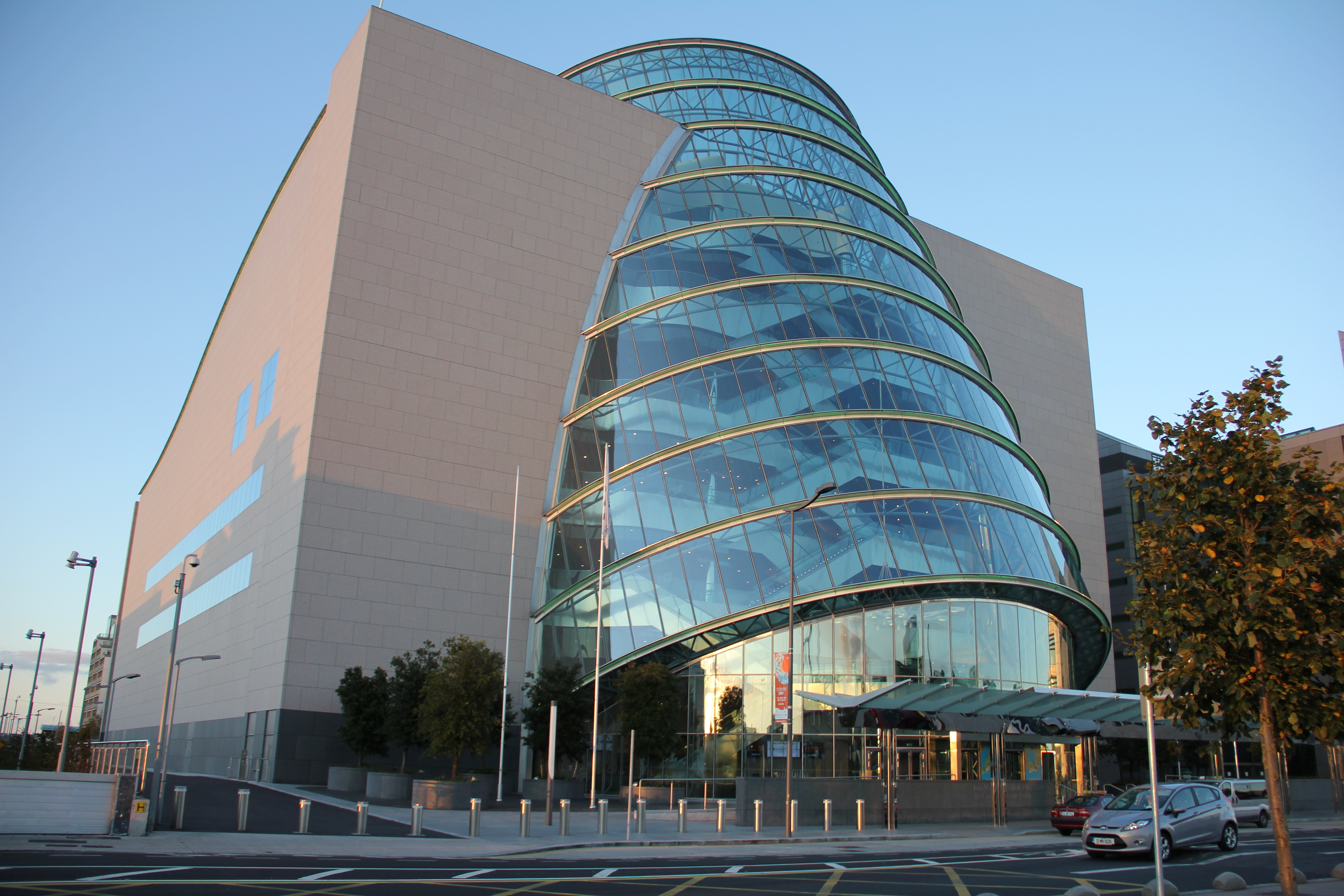
Convention Centre Dublin, the main venue for Dublin 2019

The convention took place in two main locations - the Convention Centre Dublin, and the Odeon Theatre at Point Square. In addition to the main programming, a number of fringe events took place around the city, in the Science Gallery, Irish Film Institute, the Fishamble Theatre, and Fairview Park.

== Awards ==
The World Science Fiction Society administers and presents the Hugo Awards, the oldest and most noteworthy award for science fiction. Selection of the recipients is by vote of the Worldcon members. Categories include novels and short fiction, artwork, dramatic presentations, and various professional and fandom activities.

Other awards may be presented at Worldcon at the discretion of the individual convention committee. This has often included the national SF awards of the host country, such as the Japanese Seiun Awards as part of Nippon 2007, and the Prix Aurora Awards as part of Anticipation in 2009. The Astounding Award for Best New Writer and the Sidewise Award, though not sponsored by the Worldcon, are usually presented, as well as the Chesley Awards, the Prometheus Award, and others. In 2021, the Nommo Awards began presenting at Worldcon. Dublin 2019 announced that there would be a special Hugo category for "Best Art Book". The awards were announced at the convention on 19 August.

=== 2019 Hugo Awards ===
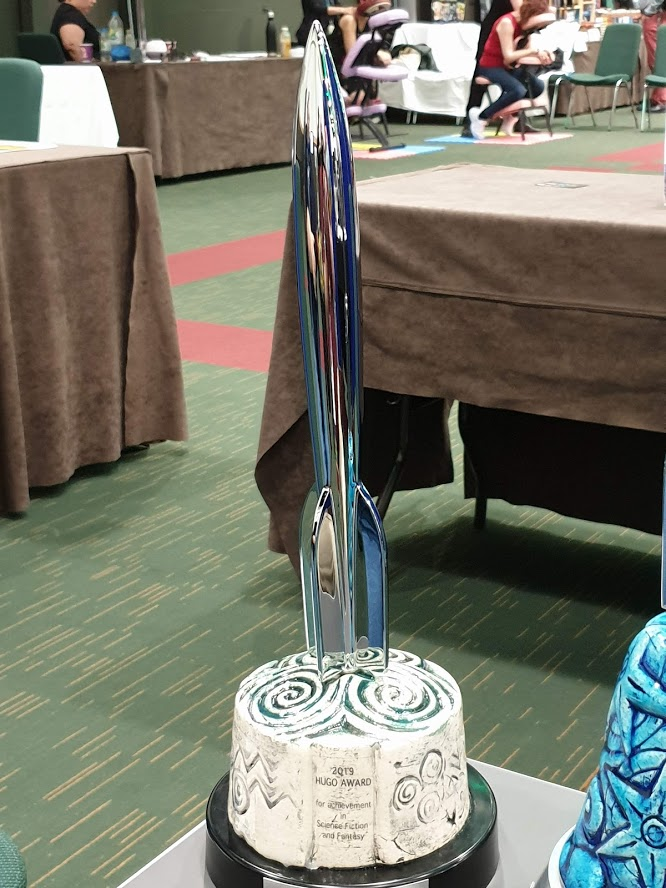
The Hugo Award design for 2019, featuring a ceramic base designed by Jim Fitzpatrick.

3,097 ballots were cast for the 2019 Hugo Awards, of which 3,089 were online ballots and 8 were paper ballots. The winners were:

- Best Novel: The Calculating Stars by Mary Robinette Kowal
- Best Novella: Artificial Condition by Martha Wells
- Best Novelette: "If at First You Don't Succeed, Try, Try Again" by Zen Cho
- Best Short Story: "A Witch's Guide to Escape: A Practical Compendium of Portal Fantasies" by Alix E. Harrow
- Best Series: Wayfarers by Becky Chambers
- Best Related Work: Archive of Our Own, a project of the Organization for Transformative Works
- Best Graphic Story: Monstress, Volume 3, written by Marjorie Liu, art by Sana Takeda
- Best Dramatic Presentation, Long Form: Spider-Man: Into the Spider-Verse, screenplay by Phil Lord and Rodney Rothman; directed by Bob Persichetti, Peter Ramsay, and Rodney Rothman
- Best Dramatic Presentation, Short Form: The Good Place: "Janet(s)" written by Josh Siegal & Dylan Morgan, directed by Morgan Sackett
- Best Professional Editor, Long Form: Navah Wolfe
- Best Professional Editor, Short Form: Gardner Dozois
- Best Professional Artist: Charles Vess
- Best Semiprozine: Uncanny Magazine, edited by Lynne M. Thomas and Michael Damian Thomas, managing editor Michi Trotta
- Best Fanzine: Lady Business, edited by "Ira, Jodie, KJ, Renay & Susan"
- Best Fancast: Our Opinions Are Correct, hosted by Annalee Newitz and Charlie Jane Anders
- Best Fan Writer: Foz Meadows
- Best Fan Artist: Likhain (Mia Sereno)
- Best Art Book: The Books of Earthsea: The Complete Illustrated Edition, illustrated by Charles Vess, written by Ursula K. Le Guin

=== Other awards ===
- Lodestar Award for Best Young Adult Book: Children of Blood and Bone, by Tomi Adeyemi
- John W. Campbell Award for Best New Writer: Jeannette Ng, for Under the Pendulum Sun

Following Jeannette Ng's acceptance speech of the award for Best New Writer, in which she called out Campbell's politics, referring to him as a "fascist", the publishers of Analog magazine announced that the John W. Campbell Award for Best New Writer would immediately be renamed to "The Astounding Award for Best New Writer".

== Site selection ==
Dublin in 2019 was the only bid which officially filed to host the 77th World Science Fiction Convention, and its selection was confirmed by vote of the members of the 75th World Science Fiction Convention in Helsinki.

== See also ==
- Hugo Award
- Science fiction
- Speculative fiction
- World Science Fiction Society
- Worldcon

Preceded by 76th World Science Fiction Convention; Worldcon 76 in San Jose, California, United States (2018)	List of Worldcons; 77th World Science Fiction Convention; Dublin 2019 in Dublin, Ireland (2019)	Succeeded by 78th World Science Fiction Convention; CoNZealand in Wellington, New Zealand (2020)
