= Iron King (disambiguation) =

Iron King was a Japanese superhero TV series from 1972 to 1973.

Iron King can also refer to:

- The Iron King, a 1955 historical novel by French author Maurice Druon
- The Iron King (1923 film), an Austrian silent film
- Philip IV of France (1268 – 1314), a king of France nicknamed the "Iron King"
- William Crawshay II (1788 - 1867), a Welsh ironmaster also nicknamed the "Iron King"
- Iron King, a 2010 fantasy novel in the series The Iron Fey by American author Julie Kagawa

== See also ==
- Kim Su-ro, The Iron King, a 2010 South Korean historical TV series
- Iron Queen (disambiguation)
- Iron (disambiguation)
- King (disambiguation)
