= Rabbit Test =

Rabbit Test may refer to:

- Rabbit test, a pregnancy test
- "Rabbit Test" (Ugly Betty), a 2009 television episode starring America Ferrera
- Rabbit Test (film), a 1978 movie starring Billy Crystal
- "Rabbit Test", a short story by Samantha Mills
