= Shadow of the Fox =

2018 novel by Julie Kagawa

- First edition cover
- Author: Julie Kagawa
- Language: English
- Series: Shadow of the Fox
- Genre: Fantasy
- Publisher: Harlequin Teen
- Publication date: October 2, 2018
- Publication place: United States
- Media type: Print
- Pages: 416
- Award: Freeman Awards (Honorable Mention, 2018)
- ISBN: 978-1335145161
- Followed by: Soul of the Sword

Shadow of the Fox is a young adult fantasy novel written by Julie Kagawa. It follows Yumeko, a half-kitsune girl seeking to protect a sacred scroll, and Tatsumi, a cursed ninja ordered by his clan to retrieve it, as they travel across the land and meet new companions.

The novel was published by Harlequin Teen on October 2, 2018. It is the first book in the titular Shadow of the Fox trilogy. It features prominent Japanese mythology and anime inspirations, and is based upon one of Kagawa's first manuscripts.

Shadow of the Fox was generally well received, with critics praising its story, characters, and inclusion of Japanese folklore. It received an Honorable Mention in the 2018 Freeman Awards. The novel's sequel, titled Soul of the Sword, was published in June 2019.

== Plot ==
When she was an infant, Yumeko, (Note: (夢子; lit. 'dream child')) a half-kitsune, was abandoned at the Silent Winds temple. Since then, she has been raised by monks, who have taught her to control her magic. One day, the temple is attacked by oni seeking to retrieve a scroll capable of summoning the wish-granting Great Dragon. As the temple is overrun and its monks are killed, Master Isao, Yumeko's mentor, entrusts her with a fragment of the scroll. He tells her to travel to the Steel Feather temple, which guards the scroll's other piece and will offer her sanctuary. Yumeko escapes as Master Isao sacrifices himself to buy her time.

As Yumeko flees, she encounters Kage Tatsumi, a ninja who wields a powerful sword containing the demon spirit Hakaimono. From an early age, Tatsumi underwent intensive physical and mental training to prevent him from being possessed by Hakaimono, a fate that befell many of the sword's previous wielders. Acting on orders from Lady Hanshou, head of the Shadow Clan, to recover the scroll at any cost, Tatsumi asks Yumeko where it is. She lies, claiming she knows its location but does not have it, and persuades Tatsumi to protect her in exchange for her guiding him to it.

The two travel towards the capital, where Master Isao said there would be a priest who knows the location of the Steel Feather temple. While staying at an inn, they are attacked by a wind witch and her kamaitachi familiars; after a fierce battle, Yumeko saves Tatsumi's life and defeats the witch. As they continue, Yumeko gives a spare coin to Okame, a wandering rōnin passing by. Soon afterwards, Okame and a group of bandits ambush them, but Okame turns against the bandits in gratitude for Yumeko's kindness. She invites Okame to join them, which Tatsumi reluctantly accepts.

The three pass through a village, where they are invited to stay the night. They are attacked by gaki led by a vengeful spirit whose curse led the village headman to sacrifice travelers to appease it. Despite the betrayal, Yumeko placates the spirit and lifts the curse. As they continue traveling, Okame warns her that Tatsumi may not have her best interests at heart.

The three are stopped at a bridge by a masked figure who says he is a master swordsman and challenges Tatsumi to a duel. He accepts the challenge, but the fight is interrupted by a giant yōkai, whom they all work together to defeat. Yumeko asks the masked figure to postpone the duel as a favor, and he agrees, revealing himself as Taiyo Daisuke, a noble from the imperial family.

The four arrive at the capital, where Yumeko visits the Hayate shrine to find its head priest, Master Jiro. She is met with Reika, a miko who explains that Master Jiro has gone missing after meeting with Lady Satomi. Although initially suspicious of Yumeko's half-kitsune nature, Reika is convinced after Yumeko reveals that Master Isao had entrusted her with the scroll. Reika joins the group to confront Lady Satomi, which they plan to do by going to a moon-viewing party at the palace. Later, a Shadow Clan ninja delivers orders to Tatsumi to kill Yumeko after he retrieves the scroll, leaving him in emotional turmoil.

The five attend the party, where they follow Lady Satomi after she escapes through a magical gateway. While Tatsumi, Okame, and Daisuke fight off an ambush from oni, Yumeko and Reika find and rescue Master Jiro. However, during the battle, Tatsumi loses control and is possessed by Hakaimono, who slays the oni then turns his attention to the group. Hakaimono reveals that Tatsumi's growing attachment to Yumeko had weakened his resolve, allowing Hakaimono to seize control amidst the battle. He leaves after promising to soon kill Tatsumi's friends as revenge for his years of imprisonment within the sword.

The remaining members of the group resolve to continue traveling to the Steel Feather temple. Yumeko, feeling responsible for Tatsumi's fate, asks Master Jiro if he can still be saved. Master Jiro promises to explain Tatsumi's past and what can be done, and the group resumes their journey.

== Themes and style ==
Although the novel is set in a fictional world, it prominently features elements of Japanese mythology such as kitsune and other yōkai. It also includes various aspects of traditional Japanese folklore and legends. In addition, multiple reviewers noted the story's stylistic affinity to anime in its narrative and worldbuilding elements. Both The Japan Times and Booklist referenced the anime series Inuyasha as a comparison when reviewing Shadow of the Fox.

Many critics observed that book is written using a dual narrative style, alternating between Yumeko and Tatsumi's perspectives. While this was seen as allowing for greater character development and depth for the two, both individually and as a pair, it was also commented upon as leading to repetition in certain parts of the narrative.

== Development and publication ==
Prior to publishing her debut novel The Iron King in 2010, Kagawa had written a manuscript titled Kitsune's Heart. However, she was unable to get it published even after a year. After finishing her Talon series in 2018, Kagawa decided to return to it. Because Kitsune's Heart was originally written as an adult fantasy, she rewrote it as a young adult novel that became Shadow of the Fox. Although she had to do a "complete overhaul", the overall plot as well as the characters of Yumeko and Tatsumi remained largely unchanged.

Kagawa characterized her writing process as "writ[ing] an anime" in book form. She named Inuyasha, Rurouni Kenshin, Yona of the Dawn, and Fushigi Yûgi as significant inspirations for her work, and mentioned that she "pa[id] homage to a lot of the anime tropes", especially for her characters' personalities and designs. In addition, she incorporated extensive Japanese mythology into the story, which she called a combination of what she "love[d]" and what she "thought would be cool". For the Japanese legends that she referenced, she tried to "stay as close to [them] as [she] could". Kagawa also added her own worldbuilding aspects, such as elemental magic and having clans to represent each element.

Kagawa sought to create a contrast between a lighthearted protagonist and an cold one, mentioning that it was "fun to [...] just play them off each other", particularly through the use of alternating perspectives. She described Tatsumi's struggle to control Hakaimono as a "counter" to Yumiko's internal conflict over her half-kitsune nature. She characterized Yumeko as "very good-natured at heart" despite her yōkai origin. She also aimed to show how Yumeko is innocent and somewhat sheltered, allowing her to have an "unexpectedly beautiful" view of the world.

Shadow of the Fox was published on October 2, 2018, under the publishing imprint Harlequin Teen. It is the first book in the titular Shadow of the Fox trilogy. The second book in the series, Soul of the Sword, was published on June 18, 2019. The third book in the series, Night of the Dragon, was published on March 31, 2020.

== Reception ==
The novel received an Honorable Mention in the 2018 Freeman Awards in the Young Adult/Middle School Literature category. Its story was generally well received, with Rachel Strolle of Reader's Digest calling the work and its sequels "among [Kagawa's] finest" in her list of the best young adult book series. Kirkus Reviews described it as an "action-packed adventure" that would draw in readers, while Elizabeth Nebeker of Voice of Youth Advocates praised it as a "epic hero quest" that would appeal to anime fans. Jessica Bratt of Booklist gave a positive assessment overall, writing that the novel "never disappoints" in its key elements.

The inclusion of Japanese mythology was praised. Sue Polchow of The School Librarian wrote that the book was "infused with rich descriptive layers" of mythology. Kaetlyn Phillips of School Library Journal described the world as "richly detailed" and "immersive", while Kirkus Reviews opined that Kagawa "sp[un] an epic yarn" using traditional elements. Strolle called the novel and its companion works a "must" for readers interested in Japanese mythology-inspired fantasy books.

Reviewers differed on the narrative pacing. Publishers Weekly felt that the start was slowed by a "complicated setup", while Phillips said that the pace would "drag and stall". Noura Khalid of The Nerd Daily was more enthused, opining that "things really get going" after the novel's beginning. Nebeker said that the story "moves quickly" when considering the dual narrative perspective and was "fast-paced [and] descriptive".

The story's characters were commended by several reviewers. Khalid felt that each of them added something to the story, while Nebeker opined that they were well-developed with strong connections between them. Polchow called Yumeko a "likable" heroine, while Sarah Fimm of The Mary Sue praised the story overall, describing Yumeko and Tatsumi's relationship as "mild on spice, but heavy on romance."

The novel's use of stock characters and references was the subject of critical discussion, with both Phillips and Publishers Weekly describing the story's cast as archetypical. Tika Viteri of Book Riot called the book a "classic adventure tale" of a found family, praising the "lovely characters" and tense scenes. Kirkus Reviews said that "despite some formulaic writing", readers would be drawn into the work and favorably anticipate its sequel.
