= The Space-Time Painter =

2022 Chinese novelette by Hai Ya

- Cover of Galaxy's Edge 009: The Space-Time Painter
- Author: Hai Ya
- Original title: 时空画师
- Language: Simplified Chinese
- Genre: Science fiction
- Published in: Galaxy's Edge 009: The Space-Time Painter
- Publisher: 8LM Culture
- Publication date: April 2022
- Publication place: China

The Space-Time Painter (Chinese: 时空画师) is a science fiction novelette written by Chinese author Hai Ya. The story follows a police detective investigating a mysterious shadow at the Palace Museum, linked to a painter from the Song Dynasty. Conceptualized in 2019 and written in 2021, the novelette was published in April 2022 by 8LM Culture as part of the anthology Galaxy's Edge 009: The Space-Time Painter. It won the Hugo Award for Best Novelette in 2023, making Hai Ya the third Chinese author to win the award, following Liu Cixin and Hao Jingfang.

== Plot ==
Police detective Zhou Ning is assigned to investigate a mysterious case at the Palace Museum, where a security guard reported seeing a skull-shaped shadow moving within the palace. Zhou initially concludes that the phenomenon is simply the result of light refraction during a rainstorm. However, Chen Wen, a museum curator, reveals that she also witnessed the same shadow while repairing a painting in the laboratory. She describes the shadow as capable of growing and moving unnaturally, which intrigues Zhou.

Obsessed with the case, Zhou spends months at the museum, encountering the shadow multiple times during rainstorms. He theorizes that the shadow might be an artificial projection originating from the underground storage; however, security camera footage shows nothing unusual. Frustrated by the lack of leads, Zhou attempts to capture the shadow during another rainstorm. Although he seemingly fails, he later discovers a black shadow attached to his back. This shadow distracts him, leading to a car accident that puts him into a coma.

While in the coma, Zhou enters an astral plane and meets the shadow, who identifies himself as Zhao Ximeng, a painter from the Song Dynasty. Zhao shares his story: he was a talented protege of a Grand Preceptor (Note: The unnamed Grand Perceptor is identified off-page as Cai Jing.) seeking to restore his power through the Emperor. Zhao possessed the ability to project his soul into a multi-dimensional space, allowing him to experience different times and places. He painted the A Thousand Li of Rivers and Mountains with this ability, which impressed the Emperor and earned him a position as the Emperor's protege. However, when ordered to create a painting that foretold the future of the Song Dynasty, Zhao boldly depicted its downfall. During a meeting with the Emperor and a messenger from Jin, he tried to warn them of impending threats and the corruption of the Grand Preceptor, but the Emperor ordered his execution instead. Shortly after, the Jingkang Incident occurred, confirming Zhao's painting. Choosing to remain in the multi-dimensional space, Zhao invites Li Song, another talented painter from the Southern Song, to join him, and he extends an invitation to Zhou, who declines, preferring to embrace life fully before facing death.

Six months later, Zhou awakens from his coma and reunites with his wife. He gains insight into their future, as well as that of Chen, and is reassigned to the Abnormal Incident Bureau to confront new challenges. (Note: Zhou Ning returns as a member of the Abnormal Incident Bureau in another Hai Ya novelette, The Far North (Chinese: 极北之地), which was featured in Galaxy's Edge 015.)

== Publication ==
=== Writing ===
In 2019, sci-fi writer Hai Ya watched an episode of the CCTV historical documentary series National Treasure, which introduced the Northern Song Dynasty painting A Thousand Li of Rivers and Mountains (Chinese: 千里江山图). He was impressed by the talent of the painter Wang Ximeng and found his accomplished but brief life resonant with the qualities he sought for the protagonist of a historical science fiction story. He began researching Wang's life and drafting the narrative in 2020. He envisioned the story as a blend of historical and science fiction, motivated by his passion for history. Although Wang Ximeng is commonly known by the surname Wang, Hai Ya noted that the inscription on A Thousand Li of Rivers and Mountains only includes "Ximeng", and that his surname Wang was derived from the Qing Dynasty antiques collector Liang Qingbiao. Therefore, he chose to refer to Ximeng as Zhao Ximeng in the story, giving him a backstory as a distant noble of the House of Zhao, including a familial connection to the shan shui painter Zhao Boju. Hai Ya cited Ted Chiang's Story of Your Life (1998) as an inspiration for the final act of the novelette, where Zhou Ning discusses Fermat's Last Theorem with Zhao. He also included the Abnormal Incident Bureau in the story's conclusion, a fictional organization that first appeared in his novelette Blood Plague (2019; Chinese: 血灾), planning to establish it within a fictional universe where each novelette serves as a standalone story but features crossover settings and characters, similar to Ni Kuang's Wisely Series. Hai Ya completed The Space-Time Painter in early 2021, but it was only released in 2022 due to a change in publisher for Galaxy's Edge, the anthology he submitted to. He explained that the three years he spent on this short story were due to his busy full-time job, allowing him to write only casually.

=== Release ===
The novelette was featured in Galaxy's Edge 009: The Space-Time Painter (Chinese: 银河边缘009：时空画师), published in April 2022. Hong Kong publisher Open Page acquired the traditional Chinese translation rights for the novelette shortly after it won the Hugo Award and published it in the short story collection The Space-Time Painter: A Selection of Hai Ya's Novellas and Novelettes (Chinese: 時空畫師：海漄中短篇科幻小說選) in February 2024, which includes a total of ten works by Hai Ya, also featuring the Galaxy Award-nominated novelette The Wrath of River (2021; Chinese: 江之怒).

== Reception ==
=== Accolades and controversy ===
The Space-Time Painter won the Hugo Award for Best Novelette in 2023, making Hai Ya the third Chinese author to receive a Hugo Award, following Liu Cixin with The Three-Body Problem (2008) and Hao Jingfang with Folding Beijing (2012). Some Chinese media outlets publicly denounced the novelette's win as "rigged". P-articles noted that the accusations against The Space-Time Painter mainly stemmed from its lack of an English translation for voters and some voters reportedly complained that their votes were misappropriated by the sci-fi magazine Science Fiction World and publisher 8LM Culture on their behalf, with netizens comparing it to the 2015 Hugo Awards controversy. The 2023 Hugo Awards, held during the 81st World Science Fiction Convention in Chengdu, China, also faced scrutiny over the voting process which shifted from public to private. Zhang Lufan, former editor of Science Fiction World, criticized The Space-Time Painter as "the work achieving a Hugo Award through lobbying, vote allocation, and rigging".

The novelette was also shortlisted for the 2nd Science Fiction Planet Award held in 2024.

=== Critical response ===
Critical reception of The Space-Time Painter was divided, with Radio Free Asia summarizing the common criticisms of the novelette as a lack of science fiction elements, originality, and a relatively dull plot compared to previous Chinese Hugo Award winners, The Three-Body Problem and Folding Beijing. Following its Hugo win, the novelette was subject to review bombing on social media and review aggregators, including Douban, where its rating dropped from 9.6/10 to 5.5/10. However, in an interview with The Beijing News, Hai Ya acknowledged the criticism and the drop in ratings as reasonable, admitting that he also felt his work was "far inferior" to other Hugo Award classics, and he understood the feedback regarding the lack of both science fiction elements and a conventional plot, which may have disappointed traditional sci-fi fans and the broader audience.

Zhang Haosu of Guangming Online wrote that The Space-Time Painter "successfully blends mystery, science fiction, and traditional Chinese culture with fluid writing and an engaging storyline", creatively exploring profound themes and historical insights within classical Chinese culture, delivering a unique "ancient-vibe fantasy" that adds significant literary value to the international sci-fi scene. Deng Hangdan and Wang Siyuan of Nanfang Daily also praised the novelette for its unique narrative, which intertwines the stories of a modern police officer and an ancient painter, highlighting its rich fusion of traditional Chinese culture and modern scientific concepts.

Lei Zhenyu, writing for Wenhui Bao, critiqued the novelette, noting that while it has garnered attention for winning the Hugo Award, it lacks depth in its themes, concepts, and character development, and suggesting that it does not represent the highest standards of Chinese science fiction. Zhao Boren of Tonight News Paper similarly noted that while the novelette contributes to promoting Chinese literature on the global stage, it falls short in originality compared to other works, emphasizing the need for innovation in blending science fiction with historical themes to truly succeed in the genre. Lei Ching was further critical in her review for Ta Kung Pao, expressing skepticism about the novelette's Hugo Award win due to its shortcomings in thematic depth and creativity compared to other Chinese sci-fi works, and suggesting that the award's significance may lie more in encouraging future Chinese sci-fi authors than in the quality of this particular work.
