= Under the Pendulum Sun =

2017 novel by Jeannette Ng

- First edition cover
- Author: Jeannette Ng
- Cover artist: John Coulthart
- Language: English
- Genre: Fantasy
- Publisher: Angry Robot
- Publication date: 3 October 2017
- Publication place: United Kingdom
- Media type: Print
- Pages: 416
- ISBN: 9780857667281

Under the Pendulum Sun is a 2017 fantasy novel by British writer Jeannette Ng. Ng's debut novel, it was published by Angry Robot.

== Synopsis ==
In an alternate history, James Cook had a fourth voyage where he discovered Fairyland, called "Arcadia", in the 1780s.

In 1847 (Note: there is a reference "in the seven years since [the 1840 wedding of Queen Victoria and Prince Albert]"), Catherine Helstone travels to Arcadia under the endorsement of the London Missionary Society to search for her brother Laon, a missionary with who disappeared while trying to convert the fae to Christianity. Arriving in Arcadia, she is met by her guide Miss Ariel Davenport, a changeling, who takes her to the mission, a castle-like manor that they call Gethsemane.

Arriving the mission she meets Mr Benjamin Goodfellow, a gnome the only convert. She's told there's also an elusive housekeeper called the Salamander. Benjamin tells Cathy that Laon is "away-away," but will be "back soon."

As days go by and Cathy awaits Laon's return, she begins to learn about Rev Jacob Roche, who first established this mission, and in increasingly frustrated by Miss Davenport's unwillingness to tell her anything substantive.

In a moment of anger, Cathy runs away from the castle into the mists surrounding it. There she meets Laon returning to Gethsemane, although he believes she is a magical illusion in the mist. They part ways, and then both find their way to Gethsemane, where they reunite in earnest. He had gone to the court of Queen Mab to petition for access to inland Arcadia. She is now coming with her court to visit Gethsemane.

== Reception ==
In the Guardian, Adam Roberts called it "strange, brooding and occasionally perverse" and "opulently atmospheric." SYFY declared it one of The 10 Best Novels of 2017, stating that its "world-building and atmosphere are just incredible" and emphasizing its Gothic tone.

Publishers Weekly considered it "intriguing but unfocused," with "possibilities [that] are fascinating" and "period touches [that] satisfy" but an "unwieldy" plot. James Nicoll called it "engaging," with Arcadia being an "odd and melancholy world," and lauded Ng's choice to reveal only the "shadow of [her] worldbuilding, [such that readers] are left to puzzle out the larger implications on their own." Jeff Somers, listing it among his "50 of the Greatest Science Fiction & Fantasy Debut Novels Ever Written", called it "a truly original fantasy debut built on a truly genius premise."

In 2020, Samantha Shannon picked the book as her submission for the "I wish more people would read..." feature in The Guardian, describing its premise as a "stroke of pure brilliance" and the book as having "the mark of a true Gothic masterpiece."

=== Awards ===
Year	Award	Category	Result	Ref
2018	British Fantasy Award	Fantasy Novel	Shortlisted	
2018	British Fantasy Award	Newcomer	Won	
2019	John W. Campbell Award	—	Won	

Ng was surprised to win the Campbell Award and gave a brief acceptance speech prepared on the spot that sharply criticized the award's namesake, leading to the award's renaming. The speech itself won a Hugo Award for Best Related Work.

== Allusions ==
The character Queen Mab comes most directly from Queen Mab by Percy Bysshe Shelley. The unusual name Laon comes from another Shelley poem, Laon and Cythna.

A Gothic novel with protagonist named Cathy and a childhood spent on the Yorkshire moors alludes to Wuthering Heights by Emily Brontë. More overtly, Cathy and Laon have childhood imaginary worlds named Gaaldine, Exina, Alcona, and Zamorna. These are all locations within the Brontës' childhood imaginary world (see Glass Town or Gondal).

=== Epigraphs ===
Each chapter of Under the Pendulum Sun begins with an epigraph excerpted from either real or fictional writings. The real writings are:

Author	Work	Ref
	Bible (Leviticus, Matthew, Song of Solomon, Revelations)	
John Sanford	Psalms, paraphrases, and hymns, adapted to the services of the Church of England	
Meric Casaubon	A True and Faithful Relation of What Passed for Many Years Between Dr John Dee and Some Spirits	
Percy Bysshe Shelley	Queen Mab	
Edgar Allan Poe	"The Raven"	
Margaret Cavendish, Duchess of Newcastle-upon-Tyne	The Blazing World	
	"Strange Discovery", The Scotsman (Note: Attributed as The Times)	
William Shakespeare	Romeo and Juliet	
John Locke	An Essay Concerning Human Understanding	
Albert Stanburrough Cook	"The Whale (Asp Turtle)", The Old English Physiologus	
John Cosin	The History of the Popish Transubstantiation	
Edward Bouverie Pusey	The Real Presence of the Body and Blood of Our Lord Jesus Christ	
Reginald Heber	"Morte D’Arthur: A Fragment", The Life of Sir Reginald Heber, D. D. Lord Bishop of Calcutta, by his Widow	

Others blur the line between real and fictional, inserting fictional alternate history text into real books:

Author	Work	Ref
J Ritson	Fairy Tales and Folk Songs, Now First Collected, with Two Dissertations on Pygmies and on Fairies	
George Young	The Life and Voyages of Captain James Cook	
