= Queen Mab =

Fairy in English literature

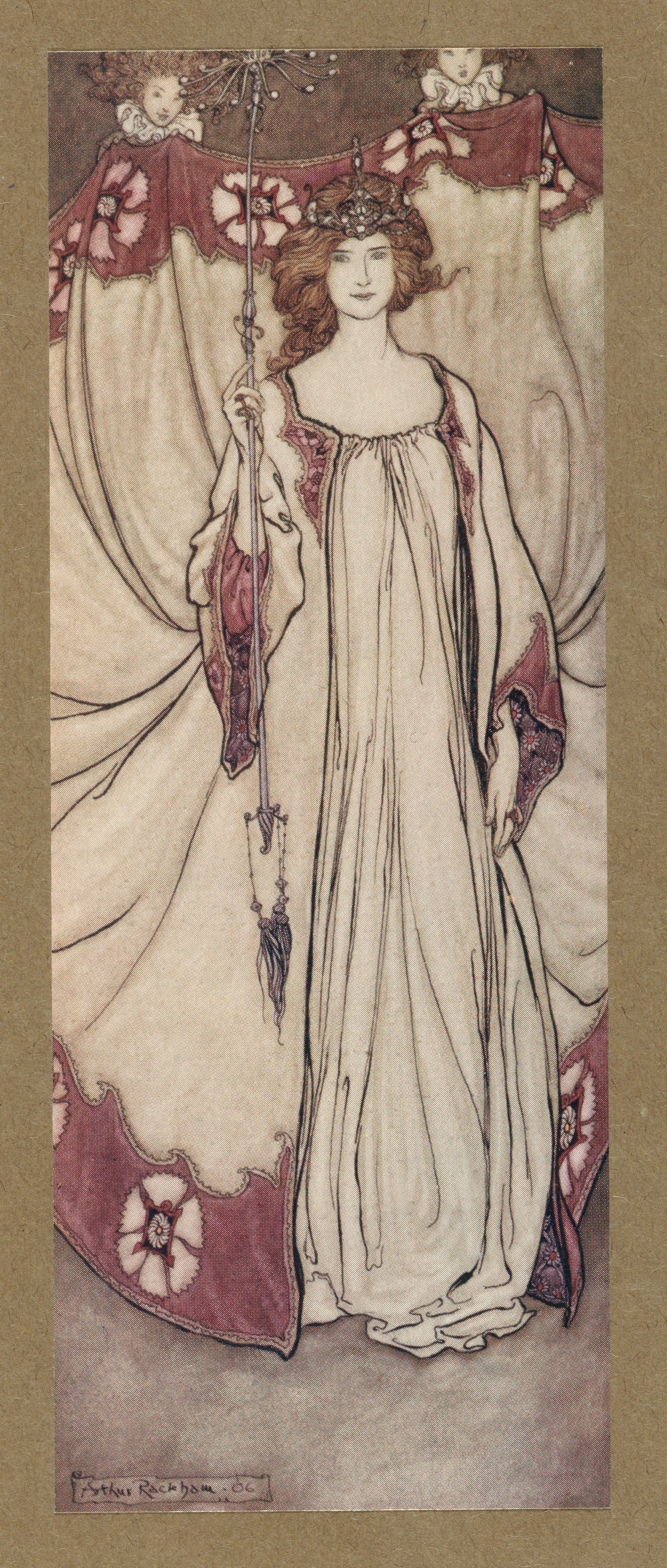
Queen Mab, illustration by Arthur Rackham (1906)

Queen Mab (First Folio: 'Queene Mab') is a fairy referred to in William Shakespeare's play Romeo and Juliet, in which the character Mercutio famously describes her as "the fairies' midwife", a miniature creature who rides her chariot (which is driven by a team of atom-sized creatures) over the bodies of sleeping humans during the nighttime, thus helping them "give birth" to their dreams. Later depictions in other poetry and literature and various guises in drama and cinema have typically portrayed her as the Queen of the Fairies.

== Origin ==
Shakespeare may have borrowed the character of Mab from folklore, but this is debated and there have been numerous theories on the origin of the name. A popular theory holds that Mab derives from Medb (pronounced "Maive"), a legendary queen from 12th-century Irish poetry; scholar Gillian Edwards notes "little resemblance", however, between the two characters. There is marked contrast between the formidable warrior Medb and the tiny dream-bringer Mab.

Other authors such as Wirt Sikes argued that Mab comes from the Welsh "mab" ("child" or "son"), although critics noted the lack of supporting evidence. Thomas Keightley suggested a connection to Habundia or Dame Habonde, a goddess associated with witches in medieval times and sometimes described as a queen.

A more likely origin for Mab's name would be from Mabel and the Middle English derivative "Mabily" (as used by Chaucer) all from the Latin amabilis ("lovable"). Simon Young contends that this fits in with fairy names in British literature of the time, which tended to be generic and monosyllabic. "Mab" was a nickname for a low-class woman or prostitute, or possibly for a haglike witch. Similarly, "queen" is a pun on "quean", a term for a prostitute.

== Mercutio's speech ==
"O, then, I see Queen Mab hath been with you.
She is the fairies' midwife, and she comes
In shape no bigger than an agate-stone
On the fore-finger of an alderman,
Drawn with a team of little atomies
Athwart men's noses as they lie asleep;
Her wagon-spokes made of long spinners' legs,
The cover of the wings of grasshoppers,
The traces of the smallest spider's web,
The collars of the moonshine's wat'ry beams,
Her whip of cricket's bone; the lash of film;
Her waggoner a small grey-coated gnat,
Not half so big as a round little worm
Pricked from the lazy finger of a maid:
Her chariot is an empty hazelnut
Made by the joiner squirrel or old grub,
Time out o' mind the fairies' coachmakers.
And in this state she gallops night by night
Through lovers' brains, and then they dream of love;
O'er courtiers' knees, that dream on court'sies straight,
O'er lawyers' fingers, who straight dream on fees,
O'er ladies' lips, who straight on kisses dream,
Which oft the angry Mab with blisters plagues,
Because their breaths with sweetmeats tainted are:
Sometime she gallops o'er a courtier's nose,
And then dreams he of smelling out a suit;
And sometime comes she with a tithe-pig's tail
Tickling a parson's nose as a' lies asleep,
Then dreams he of another benefice:
Sometime she driveth o'er a soldier's neck,
And then dreams he of cutting foreign throats,
Of breaches, ambuscadoes, Spanish blades,
Of healths five-fathom deep; and then anon
Drums in his ear, at which he starts and wakes,
And being thus frighted swears a prayer or two
And sleeps again. This is that very Mab
That plaits the manes of horses in the night,
And bakes the elflocks in foul sluttish hairs,
Which once untangled, much misfortune bodes:
This is the hag, when maids lie on their backs,
That presses them and learns them first to bear,
Making them women of good carriage:
This is she—"

— Mercutio in Romeo and Juliet, Act I, scene IV

== In other works ==
Since then, Queen Mab re-appears in works:

- Ben Jonson's "The Entertainment at Althorp" (1603)
- Michael Drayton's "Nymphidia" (1627)
- In Poole's work Parnassus (1657), Mab is described as the Queen of the Fairies and consort to Oberon, emperor of the Fairies.
- 1750 pantomime by actor Henry Woodward,
- Queen Mab (1813), the first large poetic work written by Percy Bysshe Shelley
- The composer Hector Berlioz wrote a "Queen Mab" scherzo in his Romeo et Juliette symphony (1839). Hugh Macdonald describes this piece as "Berlioz's supreme exercise in light orchestral texture, a brilliant, gossamer fabric, prestissimo and pianissimo almost without pause... The pace and fascination of the movement are irresistible; it is some of the most ethereally brilliant music ever penned."
- Charles Gounod's 1867 opera Romeo et Juliette includes a song about Queen Mab sung by the character Mercutio.
- The 1994 adventure game King's Quest VII has the player venture into the Realm of Dreams to rescue Lady Mab, "the Queen of Dreams".
- In the 1998 television miniseries Merlin, Queen Mab (Miranda Richardson) has been inserted into Arthurian legend as the primary antagonist, but is preserved as a ruler of fairies, pixies, goblins and a belief system referred to as 'the old ways', in opposition to the introduction of Christianity by recent Roman influences. Mab is responsible for the creation of the half-human wizard Merlin and influences the conception of Mordred, Arthur's illegitimate son and her protegé. This version of Mab is the twin and opposite of the Lady of the Lake.
- In The Dresden Files Summer Knight (2002) by Jim Butcher, Mab appears as the Queen of the Unseelie Court, also known as the Queen of Air and Darkness and ruler of the Winter Fae.
- The Iron Fey series, Mab appears as the Queen of the Unseelie Court.
- Under the Pendulum Sun (2017) by Jeannette Ng has Mab as queen of the fae.
- Persona (series), where one of the available "personas" is named Queen Mab.
- The Folk of the Air (series), by Holly Black, mentions Queen Mab, as Mab Greenbriar, the founder of the Greenbriar line, the rulers of Elfhame.
