= 80th World Science Fiction Convention =

80th Worldcon (2022)

Chicon 8, the 80th World Science Fiction Convention
- Chicon 8 logo
- Genre: Science fiction
- Dates: 1–5 September 2022
- Venue: Hyatt Regency Chicago
- Location: Chicago, Illinois
- Country: United States
- Previous event: DisCon III
- Next event: Chengdu 2023
- Organizer: Helen Montgomery (Chair)
- Website: chicon.org

The 80th World Science Fiction Convention (Worldcon), also known as Chicon 8, was held on 1–5 September 2022 in Chicago, Illinois, United States.

== Participants ==
=== Guests of honor ===
- Tananarive Due and Steven Barnes (author)
- Edie Stern (fan)
- Joe Siclari
- Erle Korshak died in 2021
- Annalee Newitz (toastmaster)
- Charlie Jane Anders (toastmaster)
- Charles de Lint (author) declined due to family reasons
- Floyd Norman (artist) declined for personal reasons

== 2022 Hugo Awards ==
The World Science Fiction Society administers and presents the Hugo Awards, the oldest and most noteworthy award for science fiction. Selection of the recipients is by vote of the Worldcon members. Categories include novels and short fiction, artwork, dramatic presentations, and various professional and fandom activities.

Other awards may be presented at Worldcon at the discretion of the individual convention committee. This has often included the national SF awards of the host country, such as the Japanese Seiun Awards as part of Nippon 2007, and the Prix Aurora Awards as part of Anticipation in 2009. The Astounding Award for Best New Writer and the Sidewise Award, though not sponsored by the Worldcon, are usually presented, as well as the Chesley Awards, the Prometheus Award, and others. In 2021, the Nommo Awards began presenting at Worldcon.

The winners were:

- Best Novel: A Desolation Called Peace by Arkady Martine
- Best Novella: A Psalm for the Wild-Built by Becky Chambers
- Best Novelette: "Bots of the Lost Ark" by Suzanne Palmer
- Best Short Story: "Where Oaken Hearts Do Gather" by Sarah Pinsker
- Best Series: Wayward Children by Seanan McGuire
- Best Graphic Story or Comic: Far Sector, written by N. K. Jemisin, art by Jamal Campbell
- Best Related Work: Never Say You Can't Survive by Charlie Jane Anders
- Best Dramatic Presentation, Long Form: Dune, screenplay by Jon Spaihts, Denis Villeneuve, and Eric Roth; directed by Denis Villeneuve; based on the novel Dune by Frank Herbert
- Best Dramatic Presentation, Short Form: The Expanse: "Nemesis Games", written by Daniel Abraham, Ty Franck, and Naren Shankar; directed by Breck Eisner
- Best Professional Editor, Short Form: Neil Clarke
- Best Professional Editor, Long Form: Ruoxi Chen
- Best Professional Artist: Rovina Cai
- Best Semiprozine: Uncanny Magazine
- Best Fanzine: Small Gods, by Lee Moyer and Seanan McGuire
- Best Fancast: Our Opinions Are Correct, presented by Annalee Newitz and Charlie Jane Anders, produced by Veronica Simonetti
- Best Fan Writer: Cora Buhlert
- Best Fan Artist: Lee Moyer
- Lodestar Award for Best Young Adult Book (presented by the World Science Fiction Society): The Last Graduate, by Naomi Novik
- Astounding Award for Best New Writer (presented by Dell Magazines): Shelley Parker-Chan

== Site selection ==
The following committees announced bids for hosting the convention:

- Chicago in 2022
- Jeddah, Saudi Arabia in 2022

The site was selected by members of the 78th World Science Fiction Convention. Chicago received 517 first-preference votes and Jeddah received 33.

== See also ==
- Hugo Award
- Science fiction
- Speculative fiction
- World Science Fiction Society
- Worldcon

Preceded by 79th World Science Fiction Convention; Discon III in Washington, D.C. (2021)	List of Worldcons; 80th World Science Fiction Convention; Chicon 8 in Chicago (2022)	Succeeded by 81st World Science Fiction Convention in Chengdu, China (2023)
