= Samantha Mills (author) =

American writer

- Samantha Mills at World Fantasy Convention 2026
- Born: California, U.S.
- Education: University of California, Santa Cruz; San Jose State University
- Occupations: Novelist; short story writer; archivist
- Writing career
- Genres: Science fiction, fantasy
- Notable awards: Locus – Short Story (2023); Theodore Sturgeon (2023); Hugo – Short Story (2023); Nebula – Short Story (2023)
- Website: samtasticbooks.com

Samantha Mills is an American author and archivist. She received numerous awards for her short story "Rabbit Test", praise for her debut novel, and her other short stories have been longlisted for several science fiction and fantasy awards.

== Early life and education ==
Mills grew up in Southern California. According to Mills, she wrote her first short story, "What Hapend March Ninth!!", at seven years old after her sister threw a rock at her during a water fight. She continued reading and writing throughout her childhood.

Mills earned a B.A. in Pre- and Early Modern Literature from the University of California, Santa Cruz, and a Master's in Information and Library Science from San Jose State University. She works part-time as an archivist specializing in managing primary documents for local Southern California institutions.

== Career ==
=== Short stories ===
In 2018, Mills published her first science fiction short story: "The Gestational Cycle of Flies in a Cupboard" in Lamplight Magazine. She has since published science fiction and fantasy short stories in various magazines and podcasts. By 2020, she had one work longlisted for the BSFA Best Shorter Fiction Award, and had two stories placed on Locus's Recommended Reading list.

"Rabbit Test" was published online in 2022 via Uncanny Magazine, Issue #49. It tells the story of Grace, and later her daughter Olivia, living in a near-future society where women's rights are limited and pregnancies are heavily monitored, with abortions made illegal. Reviewer Lis Carey described the story as powerful but dark, providing readers with a useful history of pregnancy tests and abortion. Reviewer Niall Harrison described it as an "incandescent" response to Dobbs v. Jackson Women's Health Organization, the recent U.S. Supreme Court decision that overturned Roe v. Wade.

==== "Rabbit Test" awards ====
"Rabbit Test" won the Hugo, Nebula, Locus, and Theodore Sturgeon awards for Best Short Story. However, in January 2024 there was a large controversy over the 2023 Hugo Award nomination process, when internal documents were released showing that Worldcon leaders had decided to censor certain authors by excluding them from the nomination process. In response to these allegations, Mills wrote a blogpost titled "'Rabbit Test' unwins the Hugo," explaining the situation and stating that she couldn't truly feel she was a Hugo winner, so she was removing all references to the award from her media presence.

=== The Wings Upon Her Back ===
Mills published her first novel, The Wings Upon Her Back, in 2024. The science fiction tale focuses on the war-torn city of Radezhda, where five different sects serve five gods with varying occupations. The narrative alternates between two points in Winged Zemolai's life: as a youth, training to be a warrior under the powerful Winged Vodaya, and as an adult, disgraced and indecisive. The relationship between Zemolai and Vodaya is a key tension throughout the book. One critic praised the book's consideration of the impacts of abuse and its focus on female and non-binary protagonists.

Mills began writing the novel in 2017. She initially planned it as an action fantasy but added themes of fascism and strongmen politics, inspired by the themes she saw in U.S. politics at the time. Mills revised the book repeatedly to strengthen these themes. The novel was published by Tachyon Publications. Upon release, critics received the book with universal acclaim. Critics praised the examination of the consequences of Zemolai's choices and the complex impacts of fascism and religious zealotry.

=== Upcoming projects ===
In a May 8, 2024 interview, Mills stated that she was working on a new fantasy novel, nicknamed The Secret Sea Monster WIP.

== Selected works ==
=== Novels ===
- The Wings Upon Her Back (2024)

=== Collections ===
- Rabbit Test and Other Stories (2025)

=== Short stories ===
- "The Gestational Cycle of Flies in a Cupboard" – LampLight, Volume 6 Issue 3 (March 2018)
- "Strange Waters" – Strange Horizons (April 2, 2018)
- "Adrianna in Pomegranate" – Beneath Ceaseless Skies, Issue #271 (February 14, 2019)
- "One Part Per Billion" – Diabolical Plots, Issue #50 (April 15, 2019)
- "Laugh Lines" – Daily Science Fiction (June 10, 2019)
- "Four of Seven" – Escape Pod, Episode #687 (July 4, 2019)
- "Kiki Hernández Beats the Devil" – Translunar Travelers Lounge, Issue 2 (February 15, 2020)
- "Mama Cascade" – Deep Magic (Spring 2020)
- "The Limits of Magic" – Apparition Literary Magazine, Issue 11: Redemption (July 15, 2020)
- "Anchorage" – Uncanny Magazine, Issue 36 (Fall 2020)
- "Spindles" – Kaleidotrope (Spring 2021)
- "Rabbit Test" – Uncanny Magazine, Issue 49 (2022)
- "10 Visions of the Future; or, Self-Care for the End of Days" – Uncanny Magazine, Issue 63 (2025)

== Awards ==
Year	Work	Award or Nomination	Result	Ref
2018	"Strange Waters"	BSFA Award Best Shorter Fiction	Longlisted	
2019	"Adrianna in Pomegranate"	2019 Locus Recommended Reading List	—	
2020	"Kiki Hernández Beats the Devil"	2020 Locus Recommended Reading List	—	
2022	"Rabbit Test"	BSFA Award Best Shorter Fiction	Longlisted	
2022	"Rabbit Test"	Nebula Award for Best Short Story	Won	
2023	"Rabbit Test"	Hugo Award for Best Short Story (see above)	Won	
2023	"Rabbit Test"	Locus Award for Best Short Story	Won	
2023	"Rabbit Test"	Theodore Sturgeon Memorial Award	Won	
2025	The Wings Upon Her Back	World Fantasy Award-Novel	Finalist	
2025	The Wings Upon Her Back	Compton Crook Award	Won	
2026	"10 Visions of the Future; or, Self-Care for the End of Days"	Hugo Award for Best Short Story	Finalist	
2026	"10 Visions of the Future; or, Self-Care for the End of Days"	World Fantasy Award—Short Fiction	Finalist	
