= Yumeko =

- Gender: Female

Origin
- Origin: Japanese
- Meaning: Dream Child
- Region of origin: Japanese

Yumeko (夢子) is a Japanese feminine given name, which translates to 'Dream Child'.

Yumeko often refers to:

== Companies ==
- Yumeko (company), Amsterdam based Dutch brand of sustainable bedding products

== People ==
- Yumeko Aizome (逢初 夢子; born 1915), Japanese former film and stage actress

== Characters ==
- Yumeko Fujiwara, a character in the manga series Boku Girl
- Yumeko Kimura, a character in the manga series Cooking Papa
- Yumeko, a character in the manga series GeGeGe no Kitaro
- Yumeko Nonohara, a character in the manga and anime series Hime-chan's Ribbon
- Yumeko Jabami, a character in the manga and anime series Kakegurui - Compulsive Gambler
- Yumeko Hananokoji, a character in the manga and anime series Kekkaishi
- Yumeko Jinguuji, a character in the erotic visual novel and adventure game Maple Colors
- Yumeko Kawai, a character in the manga and anime series Ninja Hattori-kun
- Yumeko Hanazawa, a character in the manga series Otomen
- Yumeko, a character in the film Outlaw: Gangster VIP
- Yumeko Kōda, a character in the manga series Plus-Sized Misadventures in Love!
- Yumeko, a character in the novel Shadow of the Fox
- Yumeko Makiba, a character in the anime series Shima Shima Tora no Shimajirō
- Yumeko Hoshino, a character in the V-Cinema Tensou Sentai Goseiger Returns
- Yumeko Sakurai, a character in the media franchise The Idolmaster
- Yumeko Tachibana, a character in the manga and anime series This Art Club Has a Problem!
- Yumeko Shikiya, a character in the light novel series Too Many Losing Heroines!
- Yumeko, a character in the video game series Touhou Project
