= 79th World Science Fiction Convention =

79th Worldcon (2021)

DisCon III, the 79th World Science Fiction Convention
- Genre: Science fiction
- Dates: 15–19 December 2021
- Venue: Omni Shoreham Hotel
- Location: Washington, D.C.
- Country: United States
- Previous event: CoNZealand
- Next event: Chicon 8
- Organizer: Mary Robinette Kowal, Chair
- Website: discon3.org (archived)

The 79th World Science Fiction Convention (Worldcon), also known as DisCon III, was held on 15–19 December 2021 in Washington, D.C., United States.

== Participants ==
=== Guests of honor ===
- artist John Harris
- author Nancy Kress
- fan Ben Yalow

=== Special Guests ===
- Malka Older
- Sheree Renée Thomas
- Andrea Hairston

== Awards ==
The World Science Fiction Society administers and presents the Hugo Awards, the oldest and most noteworthy award for science fiction. Selection of the recipients is by vote of the Worldcon members. Categories include novels and short fiction, artwork, dramatic presentations, and various professional and fandom activities.

Other awards may be presented at Worldcon at the discretion of the individual convention committee. This has often included the national SF awards of the host country, such as the Japanese Seiun Awards as part of Nippon 2007, and the Prix Aurora Awards as part of Anticipation in 2009. The Astounding Award for Best New Writer and the Sidewise Award, though not sponsored by the Worldcon, are usually presented, as well as the Chesley Awards, the Prometheus Award, and others. In 2021, the Nommo Awards began presenting at Worldcon.

=== 2021 Hugo Awards ===
The winners were:

- Best Novel: Network Effect, by Martha Wells
- Best Novella: The Empress of Salt and Fortune, by Nghi Vo
- Best Novelette: "Two Truths and a Lie", by Sarah Pinsker
- Best Short Story: "Metal Like Blood in the Dark", by T. Kingfisher
- Best Series: The Murderbot Diaries, by Martha Wells
- Best Related Work: Beowulf: A New Translation, by Maria Dahvana Headley
- Best Graphic Story: Parable of the Sower: A Graphic Novel Adaptation, written by Octavia E. Butler, adapted by Damian Duffy, illustrated by John Jennings
- Best Dramatic Presentation, Long Form: The Old Guard, written by Greg Rucka, directed by Gina Prince-Bythewood
- Best Dramatic Presentation, Short Form: The Good Place: "Whenever You’re Ready", written and directed by Michael Schur
- Best Professional Editor, Long Form: Diana M. Pho
- Best Professional Editor, Short Form: Ellen Datlow
- Best Professional Artist: Rovina Cai
- Best Semiprozine: FIYAH Magazine of Black Speculative Fiction
- Best Fanzine: nerds of a feather, flock together
- Best Fancast: The Coode Street Podcast, presented by Jonathan Strahan and Gary K. Wolfe, produced by Jonathan Strahan
- Best Fan Writer: Elsa Sjunneson
- Best Fan Artist: Sara Felix
- Best Video Game: Hades, publisher and developer Supergiant Games

=== Other awards ===
The winners were:

- Lodestar Award for Best Young Adult Book: A Wizard's Guide to Defensive Baking, by T. Kingfisher
- Astounding Award for Best New Writer: Emily Tesh

== Site selection ==
DC in 2021 was the only bid which officially filed to host the 79th World Science Fiction Convention, and its selection was confirmed by vote of the members of the 77th World Science Fiction Convention.

== Notes ==
The convention was originally scheduled to take place 25–29 August, but was rescheduled to 15–19 December because of the COVID-19 pandemic.

== See also ==
- Hugo Award
- Science fiction
- Speculative fiction
- World Science Fiction Society
- Worldcon

Preceded by 78th World Science Fiction Convention; CoNZealand in Wellington, New Zealand (2020)	List of Worldcons; 79th World Science Fiction Convention; DisCon III in Washington, D.C., United States (2021)	Succeeded by 80th World Science Fiction Convention; Chicon 8 in Chicago, Illinois, United States (2022)
