= Jeannette Ng =

British fantasy writer

- 吳志麗
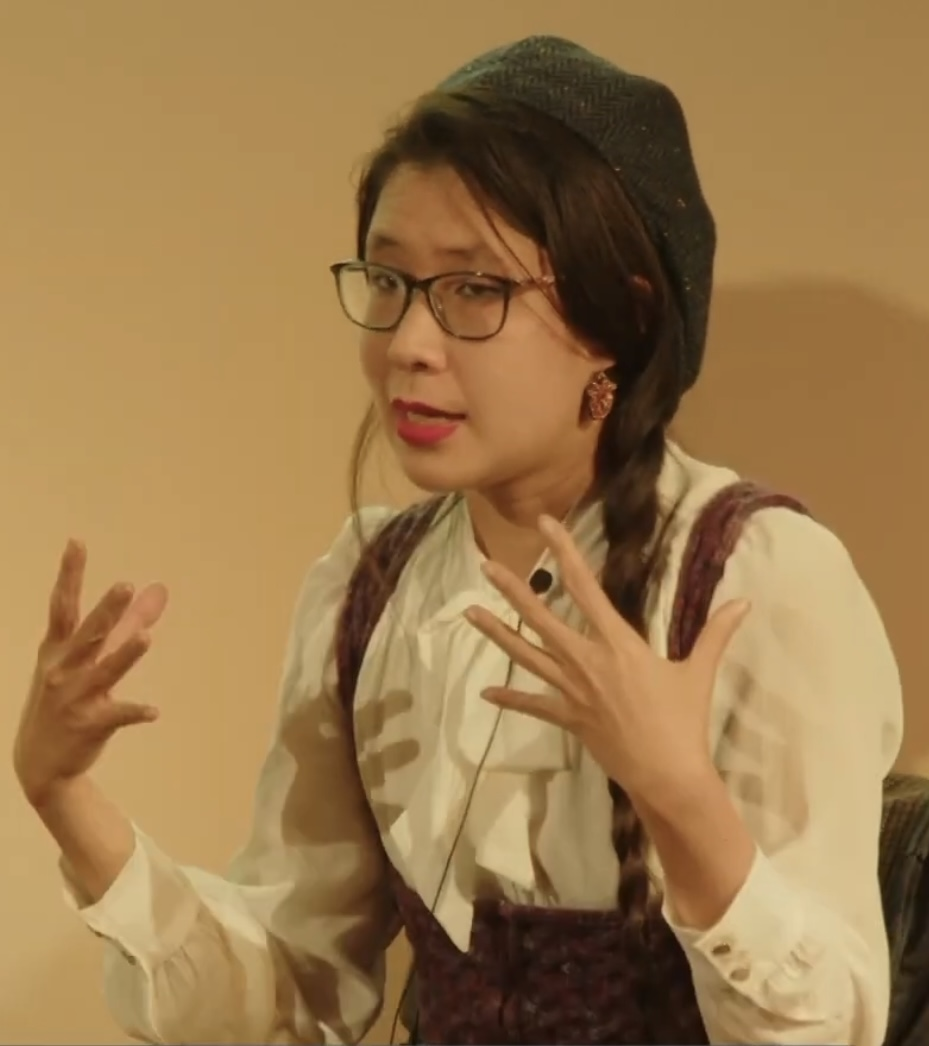
- Ng at the British Library in 2023
- Born: Hong Kong
- Education: Durham University
- Occupation: Author
- Writing career
- Language: English
- Genre: Fantasy
- Notable works: Under the Pendulum Sun; 2019 John W. Campbell Award Acceptance Speech
- Notable awards: Hugo Award for Best Related Work, 2020; John W. Campbell Award for Best New Writer, 2019; Sydney J Bounds Award for Best Newcomer, 2018 British Fantasy Awards

Jeannette Ng
- Traditional Chinese: 吳志麗
Transcriptions
Yue: Cantonese
- Jyutping: ng4 zi3 lai6

Jeannette Ng (Chinese: 吳志麗) is a British fantasy writer best known for her (Note: Ng uses both she/her and they/them pronouns; this article uses she/her for consistency.) 2017 novel Under the Pendulum Sun, for which she won the Sydney J Bounds Award for Best Newcomer at the 2018 British Fantasy Awards. For that work, she was also the winner of the 2019 John W. Campbell Award for Best New Writer, which, largely due to her acceptance speech, was shortly thereafter renamed to the Astounding Award for Best New Writer. In 2020, she won the Hugo Award for Best Related Work for that acceptance speech.

== Life and education ==
Ng was born in Hong Kong, and used her 2019 John W. Campbell Award for Best New Writer acceptance speech to pay tribute to the Hong Kong anti-extradition bill protestors. In 2022 she was among the Hugo winners who signed an open letter calling for revocation of the Chinese hosting of the 2023 81st World Science Fiction Convention.

She studied at Durham University, earning an M.A. in Medieval and Renaissance Studies. She lives in Durham, England. Ng is a nonbinary woman and uses she or they pronouns.

In 2025, Ng and Lauren Beukes set up "The Genre Creators for Trans Rights Auction", with authors including Olivie Blake, Patrick Rothfuss, Ali Hazelwood and Adrian Tchaikovsky, as well as the estate of Terry Pratchett, donating items to raise money for the Good Law Project and Cape Town's Triangle Project to work for trans rights in the wake of both the UK Supreme Court ruling on the meaning of sex in the Equality Act 2010, and simultaneous funding pressures on South African queer rights organisations.

== Career ==
=== Publications ===
Ng's 2017 debut novel Under the Pendulum Sun (published by Angry Robot) concerns a fantastical journey in gothic mid-19th century England, and was shortlisted for Starburst's 2017 Brave New Words award and the 2018 Robert Holdstock Award for Best Fantasy Novel at the British Fantasy Awards. It was named by Syfy as one of the "10 Best Sci-Fi and Fantasy Books of 2017" and included in Adam Roberts' list of "The best science fiction and fantasy of 2017" in The Guardian and Jeff Somers' list of "50 of the Greatest Science Fiction & Fantasy Debut Novels Ever Written."

Ng won the Sydney J Bounds Award for Best Newcomer at the 2018 British Fantasy Awards for Under the Pendulum Sun, and was a 2018 finalist and 2019 winner of the John W. Campbell Award for Best New Writer, announced as part of the Hugo Awards.

Her story "How the Tree of Wishes Gained its Carapace of Plastic" is included in the anthology Not So Stories, published April 2018 by Abaddon Books, and was described by Starburst as "a tour de force of the author's talents." Other short stories have been published in Mythic Delirium and Shoreline of Infinity magazines.

=== John W. Campbell Award and acceptance speech ===
In 2019, Ng won the John W. Campbell Award for Best New Writer, awarded during the Hugo Award ceremony at the 77th World Science Fiction Convention.

As part of her acceptance speech, she referred to the award's namesake John W. Campbell as "a fucking fascist", sparking debate in the science fiction and fantasy community.

On 27 August, the editor of award sponsors Analog Science Fiction and Fact announced that the award would be renamed the Astounding Award for Best New Writer.

In July 2020, Ng was awarded the Hugo Award for Best Related Work for her 2019 John W. Campbell Award acceptance speech. In her acceptance speech for this award (delivered by video due to the COVID-19 pandemic), she said that "pulling down memorials to dead racists is not the erasing of history, it is how we make history". She also said that "Last time I gave a speech at WorldCon, it was literally hours after a huge march in Hong Kong, my most cyberpunk of cities. Since then, things have gotten worse." "The tactics used to marginalise us, the tear gas used against us, it is the same everywhere. And we defeat it in the same way. And so our coming together is more important than ever before. To write a future of joy and hope and change." "Now is the time. Now is always the time. Free Hong Kong, Revolution of Our Time."

== Awards ==
Year	Nominee	Award	Category	Result	Ref
2017	Under the Pendulum Sun	Starburst's Brave New Words Award	—	Nominated	
2018	Under the Pendulum Sun	British Fantasy Award	Newcomer (the Sydney J Bounds Award)	Won	
2018	Under the Pendulum Sun	British Fantasy Award	Fantasy Novel (the Robert Holdstock Award)	Shortlisted	
2018	Under the Pendulum Sun	John W. Campbell Award	—	Shortlisted	
2019	Under the Pendulum Sun	John W. Campbell Award	—	Won	
2020	2019 John W. Campbell Award Acceptance Speech	Hugo Award	Related Work	Won	

== Bibliography ==
=== Novels ===
- —— (2017). Under the Pendulum Sun (paperback 1st ed.). Nottingham: Angry Robot. pp. 1–409. ISBN 9780857667274.

=== Short fiction ===
Year	Title	Publication	Ref. / Notes
2016	"Three Hundred Years"	—— (March 2016). "Three Hundred Years". Mythic Delirium. 2 (3).	
2017	"Goddess with a Human Heart"	—— (Summer 2017). "Goddess with a Human Heart". Shoreline of Infinity (8).	
2018	"How the Tree of Wishes Gained Its Carapace of Plastic"	—— (April 2018). "How the Tree of Wishes...". Not So Stories. Abaddon Books. ISBN 9781781087800.	
2018	"We Regret to Inform You"	—— (August 2018). "We Regret to Inform You". This Dreaming Isle. ISBN 9781907389597.	
2023	"The Girl with a City Inside of Her"	—— (September 2023). "The Girl with a City Inside of Her". Uncanny Magazine (54).	

=== Essays ===
- "Textile Arts Are Worldbuilding, Too" in Lost Transmissions: The Secret History of Science Fiction and Fantasy (2019), ed. Desirina Boskovich
- "As You Know, Bob...", in Uncanny Magazine (November–December 2019)
- "2019 John W. Campbell Award Acceptance Speech" (2020)
- "The History and Politics of Wuxia" in Tor.com (2019)
- "She Is Sword, and She Is Sorcery: Womanhood in The Witcher and The Wheel of Time" in Uncanny Magazine (July–August 2022)
