= Julie Kagawa =

American author (born 1982)

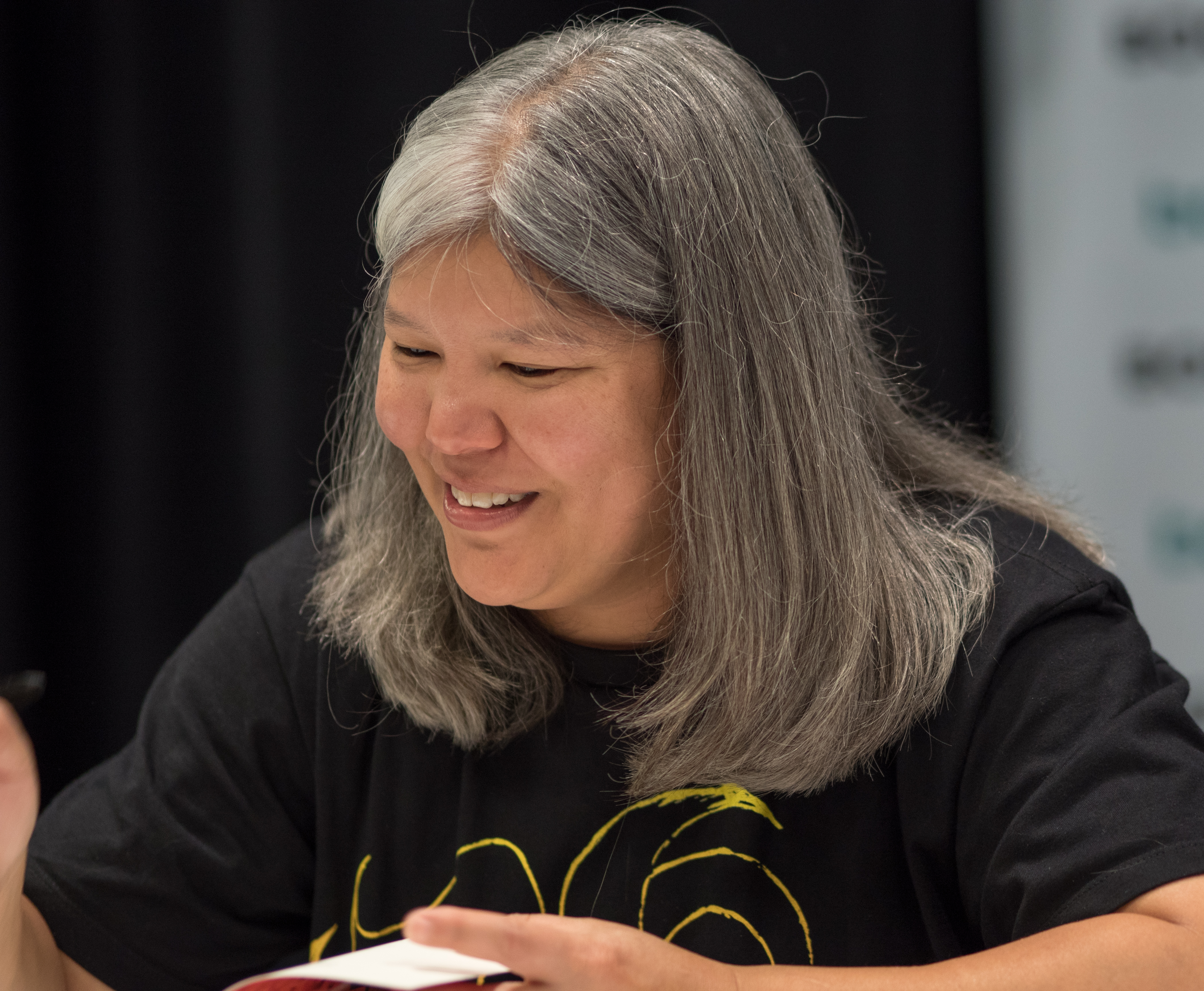
- Kagawa autographing a book at BookExpo America in 2018
- Born: October 12, 1982 (age 44); Sacramento, California, U.S.
- Occupation: Author
- Writing career
- Genre: Young adult fiction
- Notable work: The Iron King
- Notable awards: RITA award – Young Adult Romance; 2011 The Iron King
- Movements: Contemporary fantasy, urban fantasy, and magical realism
- Website: juliekagawa.com

Julie Kagawa (born October 12, 1982) is an American author, best known for publishing and writing The Iron Fey Series consisting of 15 books including: The Iron King, The Iron Daughter, The Iron Queen, and The Iron Knight.

== Biography ==
She was born in Sacramento, California, but moved to Hawaii with her family at the age of nine. Kagawa is of Japanese descent. She currently lives in Louisville, Kentucky. Kagawa has written novellas, along with novels. Three novellas were written in the Iron Fey series: Winter's Passage, Summer's Crossing, and Iron's Prophecy. In August all three were published together as The Iron Legends. A short novella of the lovers of the Iron Fey series during Valentine's Day was published on Kagawa's website. She has written a spin-off series of the Iron Fey called Call of the Forgotten. The first book, The Lost Prince, was published in October 2012. The second book, The Iron Traitor, was published on 29 October 2013.

Kagawa's vampire series is called Blood of Eden. The first book of this series is called The Immortal Rules and was published April 24, 2012. The second book is titled The Eternity Cure and was published May 1, 2013. The series has been optioned to become a movie by Joni Sighvatsson of Palomar Pictures. Kagawa has also opened her own Etsy shop where she sells her miniature clay figurines. She also draws illustrations that match her books.

== Bibliography ==
=== The Iron Fey series ===
- The Iron King (2010)
- First Kiss (2013) short scene from Ash's point of view. Available online.
- Winter's Passage (2010) short fiction published in the anthology The Iron Legends
- The Iron Daughter (2010)
- The Iron Queen (2011)
- Summer's Crossing (2011) short fiction published in the anthology The Iron Legends
- The Iron Knight (2011)
- Iron's Prophecy (released September 1, 2012) short fiction published in the anthology The Iron Legends
- The Iron Legends (released August 28, 2012) omnibus edition
- The Iron Raven
- The Iron Sword

=== The Iron Fey: Call of the Forgotten Trilogy ===
- The Lost Prince (released October 23, 2012)
- The Iron Traitor (released October 29, 2013)
- The Iron Warrior (released October 27, 2015)

=== Blood of Eden ===
- Dawn of Eden (released January 29, 2013), short story published in 'Til The World Ends
- The Immortal Rules (released April 24, 2012)
- The Eternity Cure (released April 30, 2013)
- The Forever Song (released April 15, 2014)

=== Talon series ===
- Talon (released October 28, 2014)
- Rogue (released May 1, 2015)
- Soldier (released April 26, 2016)
- Legion (released May 4, 2017)
- Inferno (release April 24, 2018)

=== Shadow of the Fox series ===
- Shadow of the Fox (released October 2, 2018) ISBN 9781488097225
- Soul of the Sword (released June, 2019) ISBN 9781335184993
- Night of the Dragon (released April, 2020) ISBN 9781848457706

=== Other ===
- "Eyes like Candlelight" in A Thousand Beginnings and Endings, edited by Ellen Oh and Elsie Chapman (June 26, 2018)
- Shinji Takahashi and the Mark of the Coatl (released April 26, 2022)

1. "Fateless" (released July 15, 2025)

== Awards and reception ==
- 2011 – Romance Writers of America RITA Award, Young Adult Romance – The Iron King
