= List of Worldcon guests of honor =

This is a list of people who have been official guests of honor at the World Science Fiction Convention, since the first Worldcon in 1939.

Each Worldcon committee selects the guests of honor (often just "GoH" in publications) for the convention.

Year	Name
1964	Forrest J Ackerman
1965, 1979	Brian Aldiss
2007	Yoshitaka Amano
1995	Gerry Anderson
1959	Poul Anderson
2011	Ellen Asher
1955	Isaac Asimov
1993	Alicia Austin
2000	Jim Baen
1989	Betty Ballantine
1989	Ian Ballantine
2014	Iain Banks
1976, 1994	George Barr
2001	Greg Bear
1999	Gregory Benford
1987	Alfred Bester
1960	James Blish
1948, 1973	Robert Bloch
1950	Anthony Boucher
2000	Ben Bova
1964	Leigh Brackett
1986	Ray Bradbury
2007	David Brin
2020	Greg Broadmore
2011	Charles N. Brown
1983	John Brunner
2019	Ginjer Buchanan
1997	Algis Budrys
2008	Lois McMaster Bujold
2019	Jocelyn Bell Burnell
2019	Bill Burns
1987	Jim Burns
2019	Mary Burns
1947, 1954, 1957	John W. Campbell
1949	John Carnell
1986	Terry Carr
1982	A. Bertram Chandler
2002	David A. Cherry
1998	C. J. Cherryh
1956	Arthur C. Clarke
1995	Vin¢ Clarke
1991	Hal Clement
2014	John Clute
1996	Roger Corman
1972	Buck Coulson
1972	Juanita Coulson
2016	Kinuko Y. Craft
2013	Ellen Datlow
1966	L. Sprague de Camp
1967	Lester del Rey
1995	Samuel R. Delany
2022	Charles de Lint
2006	Howard DeVore
1992	Vincent Di Fate
1984	Gordon R. Dickson
2020	Larry Dixon
2009	Tom Doherty
2001	Gardner Dozois
2019	Diane Duane
1995	Les Edwards
2014	Malcolm Edwards
2000	Bob Eggleton
1978	Harlan Ellison
1949	Lloyd Arthur Eshbach
1968	Philip José Farmer
1993	Jan Howard Finder
2014	Chris Foss
2015	Brad Foster
1970	Herbert W. Franke
1982, 2003	Frank Kelly Freas
2009	Neil Gaiman
1969	Jack Gaughan
1952	Hugo Gernsback
2015	David Gerrold
1999	Bruce Gillespie
1975	Mike Glicksohn
2003	Mike Glyer
2014	Jeanne Gomoll
1991	Martin H. Greenberg
2013	James Gunn
2006	James Gurney
1990	Joe Haldeman
1964	Edmond Hamilton
2021	John Harris
1990	Harry Harrison
1987	Ray Harryhausen
2009	David G. Hartwell
2018	Frank Hayes
1941, 1961, 1976	Robert A. Heinlein
1981	Rusty Hevelin
2014	Robin Hobb
1982	Lee Hoffman
2017	John-Henri Holmberg
2017	Nalo Hopkinson
1946	Edna Mayne Hull
2019	Steve Jackson
1990	Wolfgang Jeschke
1969	Eddie Jones
1980	Damon Knight
2007	Sakyo Komatsu
2022	Erle Korshak
2021	Nancy Kress
1983	David Kyle
2020	Mercedes Lackey
1987	David Langford
1975	Ursula K. Le Guin
1951, 1979	Fritz Leiber
1963	Murray Leinster
1987	Doris Lessing
1953	Willy Ley
2023	Liu Cixin
1997	Don Maitz
2003	George R. R. Martin
1958	Richard Matheson
1994	Anne McCaffrey
2019	Ian McDonald
2015	Vonda N. McIntyre
2020	Rose Mitchell
1997	Michael Moorcock
1981	C. L. Moore
2012	Rowena Morrill
1955	Sam Moskowitz
2012	Story Musgrave
2016	Patrick Nielsen Hayden
2016	Teresa Nielsen Hayden
1993	Larry Niven
2022	Floyd Norman
1989	Andre Norton
2018	Edgar Pangborn
2000	Anne Passovoy
2000	Bob Passovoy
1939	Frank R. Paul
1980	Bruce Pelz
2018	Pierre Pettinger
2018	Sandy Pettinger
2018	John Picacio
2005	Greg Pickersgill
2016	Tamora Pierce
1972	Frederik Pohl
1990	Andrew I. Porter
1991	Richard M. Powers
2011	Tim Powers
2004	Terry Pratchett
2005	Christopher Priest
2012	Mike Resnick
2010	Kim Stanley Robinson
2018	Spider Robinson
1998	Milton A. Rothman
2023	Robert J. Sawyer
1998	Stanley Schmidt
2001	George H. Scithers
2005	Robert Sheckley
1996, 2007	Takumi Shibano
2022	Joe Siclari
1970	Robert Silverberg
1971, 1981	Clifford D. Simak
2017	Johanna Sinisalo
1987	Ken & Joyce Slater
1940	E. E. Smith
2015	Tom Smith
2004	Jack Speer
2013	Norman Spinrad
2022	Edie Stern
2008	Rick Sternbach
1998	J. Michael Straczynski
1987	Arkady and Boris Strugatsky
1962	Theodore Sturgeon
2016	Michael Swanwick
2013	Darrell K. Sweet
1997	Roy Tackett
2014	Bryan Talbot
2010	Shaun Tan
2004	William Tenn
2002	Bjo Trimble
1970	Edwin Charles Tubb
1975	Donald H. Tuck
1948, 1967	Wilson Tucker
1999	George Turner
2011	Boris Vallejo
1946	A. E. van Vogt
1992	Jack Vance
2002	Vernor Vinge
2009	Élisabeth Vonarburg
1971	Harry Warner, Jr.
2009	Taral Wayne
2017	Claire Wendling
2004	Peter Weston
1998, 2007	Michael Whelan
1996	James White
1985	Ted White
1980	Kate Wilhelm
2018	Bob Wilkins
2017	Walter Jon Williams
1977	Jack Williamson
2006	Connie Willis
1992	Walt Willis
1985	Gene Wolfe
1988	Donald A. Wollheim
1975	Susan Wood
2021	Ben Yalow
2018	Chelsea Quinn Yarbro
2005	Jane Yolen
2001	Stephen Youll
1974	Roger Zelazny
