= Jeannette Ng's Campbell Award acceptance speech =

2019 speech

On August 18, 2019, Hong Kong author Jeannette Ng won the John W. Campbell Award for Best New Writer at that year's World Science Fiction Convention. Her acceptance speech, in which she called award namesake John W. Campbell a "fucking fascist" and harshly criticized his influence on the field of science fiction, led to significant debate within science fiction fandom regarding Campbell's legacy.

== Background ==
John W. Campbell Jr. was the editor of Astounding Science Fiction (renamed Analog Science Fiction and Fact in 1960) from 1937 until his death in 1971. The early years of his editorship are often referred to as the Golden Age of Science Fiction. Because of his role in launching the careers of many important writers, in 1973 the World Science Fiction Society created an annual award for the best new writer, named in Campbell's honor. Although this award was, like the Hugo Awards, voted on by the members of the World Science Fiction Society, it was not itself a Hugo award, and was instead administered by the publishers of Analog.

Even during his lifetime, however, Campbell's political stances on many issues were controversial, and this controversy increased in the decades after his death, with some commentators focusing on the extent to which his role as Astounding/Analog editor enabled him to shape both the content of the magazine and the demographics of its contributors.

The 77th World Science Fiction Convention was held in Dublin, Ireland, on August 15–19, 2019. The winners of the Hugo Awards and other prizes, including the Campbell Award, were announced on August 18.

== Speech ==
Ng opened her acceptance speech with "John W. Campbell, for whom this award was named, was a fucking fascist!" She went on to say that he was "responsible for setting a tone of science fiction that still haunts the genre to this day", but then noted that the genre had become "wilder and stranger than his mind could imagine or allow", and emphasized that she was proud to be a part of it. She next spoke about the then-active protests in Hong Kong, which she described as "the most cyberpunk city in the world", where protesters were struggling "with the masked, anonymous stormtroopers of an autocratic Empire". She concluded by demonstrating that the artificial peacock in her hat had a mechanical tail which she was able to raise.

Ng has stated that she had not expected to win, and thus had not prepared a speech ahead of time; after another attendee criticized her for being unprepared, she wrote the speech on her phone during the award ceremony itself.

== Outcome ==
A week after Ng gave her speech, Analog announced that they were changing the name of the award for best new writer from the "John W. Campbell Award" to the "Astounding Award". Although they did not explicitly cite Ng's speech as the reason for the change, the majority of media sources agreed that this was in fact the reason; however, author John Scalzi (who himself won the award in 2006) opined that "Ng wasn't an errant spark that caused an unexpected explosion; she was the agitant that caused a supersaturated solution to crystallize", and that she "could not have precipitated a change so suddenly if there wasn't already something to precipitate. This was a long time coming."

In 2020, at the 78th World Science Fiction Convention, Ng won the Hugo Award for Best Related Work for the speech.
