= 81st World Science Fiction Convention =

81st Worldcon (2023)

2023 Chengdu, the 81st World Science Fiction Convention 2023成都世界科幻大会
- 2023 Chengdu Worldcon logo
- Status: Finished
- Genre: Science fiction
- Dates: 18–22 October 2023
- Location: Chengdu, Sichuan
- Country: China
- Previous event: Chicon 8
- Next event: Glasgow 2024
- Website: en.chengduworldcon.com (archived)

The 81st World Science Fiction Convention (Worldcon), also known as 2023 Chengdu Worldcon, was held on 18–22 October 2023 in Chengdu, Sichuan, China. The co-chairs were Chen Shi, Ben Yalow, and Hongwei He.

Some fans and authors criticized choosing a Chinese city, citing human rights in China; about 100 authors wrote an open letter asking for the convention to be moved to another place. After the convention, some American websites commented that a number of Hugo Award ballots were rejected, and that the administrators excluded some nominees from the awards process for political reasons.

== Participants ==
=== Guests of honor ===
- Cixin Liu (writer)
- Sergey Lukianenko (writer)
- Robert J. Sawyer (writer)

== Awards ==
The World Science Fiction Society administers and presents the Hugo Awards, the oldest and most noteworthy award for science fiction. Selection of the recipients is by vote of the Worldcon members. Categories include novels and short fiction, artwork, dramatic presentations, and various professional and fandom activities.

Other awards may be presented at Worldcon at the discretion of the individual convention committee. This has often included the national SF awards of the host country, such as the Japanese Seiun Awards as part of Nippon 2007, and the Prix Aurora Awards as part of Anticipation in 2009. The Astounding Award for Best New Writer and the Sidewise Award, though not sponsored by the Worldcon, are usually presented, as well as the Chesley Awards, the Prometheus Award, and others. In 2021, the Nommo Awards began presenting at Worldcon.

During the 81st Convention, a ceremony was held awarding the Chinese "Fantasy Galaxy Tour - World Science Fiction Game Annual Selection" (or "GalaxyTrek - World Sci-Fi Game of the Year") awards for video games.

The winners were:

Category	Winner	Notes
Best Novel	Nettle & Bone, by T. Kingfisher	
Best Novella	Where the Drowned Girls Go, by Seanan McGuire	
Best Novelette	"The Space-Time Painter", by Hai Ya	
Best Short Story	"Rabbit Test", by Samantha Mills	The author disavowed the win due to the ballot controversy.
Best Series	Children of Time series, by Adrian Tchaikovsky	The author disavowed the win due to the ballot controversy.
Best Graphic Story	Cyberpunk 2077: Big City Dreams, by Bartosz Sztybor, Filipe Andrade, Alessio Fioriniello, Roman Titov, Krzysztof Ostrowski	
Best Related Work	Terry Pratchett: A Life With Footnotes, by Rob Wilkins	
Best Dramatic Presentation, Long Form	Everything Everywhere All at Once, written by Daniel Kwan and Daniel Scheinert, directed by Daniel Kwan and Daniel Sheinert	
Best Dramatic Presentation, Short Form	The Expanse: "Babylon's Ashes", written by Daniel Abraham, Ty Franck, Naren Shankar, directed by Breck Eisner	
Best Professional Editor, Short Form	Neil Clarke	
Best Professional Editor, Long Form	Lindsey Hall	
Best Professional Artist	Enzhe Zhao	
Best Semiprozine	Uncanny Magazine	
Best Fanzine	Zero Gravity Newspaper, by RiverFlow and Ling Shizhen	
Best Fancast	Hugo, Girl!, by Haley Zapal, Amy Salley, Lori Anderson, and Kevin Anderson	
Best Fan Writer	Chris M. Barkley	
Best Fan Artist	Richard Man	
Lodestar Award for Best Young Adult Book	Akata Woman, by Nnedi Okorafor	Not a Hugo Award; presented by the World Science Fiction Society
Astounding Award for Best New Writer	Travis Baldree	Not a Hugo Award; presented by Dell Magazines

== Site selection ==
The following committees announced bids for hosting the convention:

- Chengdu 2023
- Memphis in 2023 (withdrawn in October 2021)
- Nice 2023 (withdrawn in July 2020)
- Winnipeg in 2023

The site was selected by members of the 79th World Science Fiction Convention. After Chengdu was selected, the organizers of the Winnipeg, Canada bid pivoted to bid for the 2023 North American Science Fiction Convention, at which they were successful.

== Controversies ==
=== Site controversy ===
In an article on the Esquire magazine, Jason Sanford, a three-time Hugo finalist, said that "There were concerns that a couple thousand people from China purchased memberships [in the World Science Fiction Society] that year to vote for Chengdu. It was unusual, but it was done under the rules."

More than 100 authors, including Hugo winners and Uyghur writers, signed an open letter in March 2022 calling for the hosting to be reconsidered due to ongoing human rights violations in the Uyghur region. The choice of location was criticized due to the possible effects of the Chinese government's censorship regime and the exclusion of authors publicly critical of human rights in China.

=== Hugo controversy ===
The voting statistics for the Hugo Awards, Lodestar Award, and Astounding Award were published on 20 January 2024, much later than usual. Questions quickly arose amongst authors surrounding several works that had been marked as ineligible without justification, such as author Xiran Jay Zhao, The Sandman episode 6, "The Sound of Her Wings", and Babel by R. F. Kuang, which had been favored to win. Further scrutiny has been leveled towards possible inconsistencies or anomalies in the statistics themselves.

Commenters on the Facebook page where the statistics were released asked Dave McCarty, a veteran of the awards committee, to explain why the four works were found ineligible. He said that he could not share exactly why but pointed them to the organization's constitution and rules. When commenters were unable to find a rule or constitutional provision that sufficed, the exchanges grew heated, with McCarty sometimes questioning or disparaging the intellectual capacity of his interlocutors, behavior he later apologized for. Emails leaked by Hugo committee member Diane Lacey, acting as a whistleblower indicated that these works had been excluded due to self-censorship by the Hugo Award administrators in order to appease the Chinese government, which has a strict censorship regime. Additionally, an unknown number of nomination ballots from Chinese voters were rejected because the award administrators considered them to be too similar to a recommendations list published by Science Fiction World, and thus equivalent to a slate. Locus wrote that this occurred even though "there is no provision in the WSFS constitution to remove slates from the ballot".

Based on complaints about the 2023 Hugo award process and official statements made about those complaints, Worldcon Intellectual Property (WIP), the non-profit organization that holds the service marks for the World Science Fiction Society, censured McCarty and two individuals who presided over the Hugo Administration Committee of the Chengdu Worldcon. WIP also reprimanded the chair of the WIP board of directors. Both the director of WIP and chair of the WIP board of directors resigned.

In February 2024, as a result of the controversy, Esther MacCallum-Stewart, chair of the 2024 Worldcon, to be held in Glasgow, announced the following commitments for the 2024 Hugo Awards: the reasons for any disqualifications of potential finalists will be published no later than April 2024; the full voting results, nominating statistics and voting statistics will be published immediately following the awards ceremony on 11 August 2024; and immediately following the awards ceremony on 11 August 2024, the Hugo administration subcommittee will publish a log explaining any decisions that they have made in interpreting the WSFS Constitution.

== See also ==
- Hugo Award
- Science fiction
- Speculative fiction
- World Science Fiction Society
- Worldcon

Preceded by 80th World Science Fiction Convention; Chicon 8 in Chicago, Illinois, United States (2022)	List of Worldcons; 81st World Science Fiction Convention in Chengdu, China (2023)	Succeeded by 82nd World Science Fiction Convention; Glasgow 2024 in Glasgow, UK (2024)
