= Blood of Eden (series) =

Novel series by Julie Kagawa

- First editions
- The Blood of Eden Series: The Immortal Rules; The Eternity Cure; The Forever Song
- Author: Julie Kagawa
- Country: United States
- Language: English
- Genre: Young adult, science fiction, fantasy
- Publisher: Harlequin Teen
- Published: April 2012 - current
- Media type: Print, ebook, audiobook

The Blood of Eden is a young adult fantasy novel series by Julie Kagawa. The first book in the series, The Immortal Rules was published on April 24, 2012 through Harlequin Teen. The series follows the character of Allison Sekemoto, a teenage vampire that is trying to survive in a world where vampires exist and rule over much of the population.

Film rights to the series have been optioned by Palomar Pictures.

== Detailed Summary of The Blood of Eden: The Immortal Rules ==
The series takes place post-apocalypse, where a virus called "Red Lung" has wiped out most of humanity, leaving vampires to rule over most of the general populace. Those who survived the virus have either survived Red Lung or have been Turned into Rabids, a relative of vampires that were created during an experiment to find a cure for Red Lung. Most humans live within vampire cities, where a Wall surrounds and protects the population from rabids. Inside, there is another Wall to the Inner City. Inside of this Wall live the vampires and their human slaves, while outside, humans survive on their own. Under the rule of vampires, registered citizens are forced to give blood for the vampires once a month, but not all humans in the cities are Registered. Allison Sekemoto is an Unregistered, living on her own with a gang of four people. She can remain in the city and doesn't have to give blood to the vampires, but still faces starvation and violence from opposing Unregistered gangs.

During a food raid outside of the Wall, Allie and her gang (Rat, Stick, and Lucas) are attacked by rabids. Rat and Lucas are almost immediately killed, and Stick was only able to flee with Allison's help. She draws them away from him, sealing her own doom. Allie is found, dying from severe rabid wounds, and rescued by Kanin, a Master vampire that offers her a choice: Turn and be reborn as a vampire, or die as a human right now. She accepts his offer to Turn her and he begins to train her as she begins her new life. She learns how to feed, fight, and survive in general, but the main and most important lesson of all: You choose your own path. As Kanin teaches Allie, he explains that she can make one of two choices: She can simply give into the demon, killing people and becoming a monster, or she can strive to keep her humanity, although the latter is extremely difficult. The learning process is long and during one of their hunting trips, they pass through Sector four- Allison's old home. Kanin tells Allison that she must leave her old life behind and forget about Stick, but Allie doesn't listen and sneaks out to visit him a few nights later.

Allie finds Stick with her old rival's gang and attempts to talk to him since he is completely hated and ostracized by the group, but soon after she reveals her new nature and he instantly screams, causing a panic through the group and Allie's immediate retreat. She went back to the hospital where she stays with Kanin. He knew exactly what she was doing, and used it as an example of human distrust and betrayal. When Kanin soon leaves to secure the area, Allie is met with Sarren, a crazy, psychotic vampire with a bone to pick with Kanin. This confrontation only ends when Allie stabs him in the eye with her pocketknife and is able to quickly lock him in the basement lab of the hospital, when Kanin suddenly returns. They find that Allie told Stick where she and Kanin were hiding out and he must have reported it.

As Kanin and Allie make their escape, they are chased by a search party that injure Kanin badly. He tells Allie to continue without him, and although she is reluctant, she eventually escapes outside of the Wall. She continually travels away from New Covington, sleeping during the days by burrowing into the ground. But as she continues, the Hunger for human blood continues to get stronger and stronger. After finding two bikers, who she kills because of her starvation, she encounters Caleb, a young boy who is lost, and helps him find his family. The group she finds travel as she does, and soon ends up traveling with them to find the mystical Eden, a land that is rumored to be on an island, free of rabids and vampires where humans can be free. Of course, Allie knows that Eden would never be a place for her. She begins falling in love with a human in the group named Zeke, but when he finds out that she is a vampire at the Archer Compound he vows he will kill her if they ever meet again. Allie leaves, wandering on her own until she finds the group again, but captured in a city called Chicago, where a group of raiders led by the vampire Jackal have captured and trapped them. Zeke and Allie team up in order to save the rest of the group, but fail in saving Darren and Jeb. Although they escape, Jackal is furious and Allie has betrayed her most important moral: Never fall in love with a human.

== Detailed Summary of The Blood of Eden: The Eternity Cure ==
The second book in the series starts with Allie looking for her creator, Kanin, who is being tortured by the psychotic vampire Sarren. Following the blood tie, Allie encounters her brother Jackal who wishes to join her in helping to save their creator in Washington D.C. The pull of blood leads Allie and her new found brother to New Covington, where they discover a new outbreak threatening humanity. Allie knowing that the outbreak was started by Sarren, her determination to save her master and find the cure increases. Allie and Jackal not only discover the new Red lung outbreak but also the finding of Zeke who is helping a group of uninfected humans stay alive. Zeke and Jackal, before they can act their revenge upon each other, Allie shows them the bigger mission. Allie, Jackal and Zeke soon make their way into the palace of Prince Salazar where they not only find Sarren as a trusted man to the king but an old friend of Allie, Stick, who has much hate towards her. When Sarren is revealed as the true cause of the sudden outbreak, he tries to kill the prince and the group unsuccessfully. With new found trust in the group, prince Salazar makes a deal with Allie, that if she finds the cure within 72 hours (Three Days), he shall give her Kanin. Allie first however, wishes to see Kanin, though what she finds is instead an uncontrollable beast that bites her when she offers him food. Prince Salazar offers Allie, Jackal and Zeke a place to stay over night whilst awaiting to see if Kanin has improved. During that time, Allie first encounters music being played by a piano, Zeke surprised, dances with Allie. The next day, Kanin has improvement and is sent by the Prince to accompany the group in finding the cure, the group curious as to why the Prince would allow this, discover that Kanin is infected. This discovery immediately makes them quicken their search for the cure. Prince Salazar's men, including Stick, escort the group into the fringe in search of Sarren and the cure. Yet their journey is interrupted when Stick decides to enact his hate upon Allie by nearly killing her using the Prince's soldiers. Allie crushes the soldiers whilst nearly killing Stick before Zeke calms her down and reminds Allie of who she truly is. The slight interruption dissipates when the group continues their search, yet makes an unplanned stop when Allie discovers that Zeke is also infected and that the infection is spreading quickly. Zeke immediately requests that when the infection envelops him, that they kill him. Fearing his death, Allie makes a deal with Zeke, that they will lock him up in an abandoned car and bring back the cure in hopes of reviving him. Leaving Zeke in a crashed van, Allie, Jackal and a weak Kanin carry on their search for Sarren and the cure. Throughout the journey, the team walk through the tunnels with a withering Kanin behind them before Jackal decides to leave the search. When Allie and Kanin finally discover Sarren in one of the old labs from the experiments. A fight begins between an ailing Kanin and Sarren where Jackal is presented as a traitor by helping Sarren capture Allie. Right before Sarren can kill Kanin, Jackal betrays Sarren and tries to kill him, failing to do so nearly results in Jackal's death, but a cured Zeke rescues Jackal. Sarren escapes quickly leaving Allie, Jackal and Kanin to uncover the cure in Zeke's blood. After taking samples of his blood into their own, Allie, Jackal and Kanin give the cure to the Prince as the set off to fully exterminate Sarren once and for all. The group stays another night at Prince Salazar's kingdom, with Zeke and Allie sharing an intimate conversation. The next day, Allie wakes up to find Zeke gone and a dying traitor, Stick, who confesses in betraying the Prince to reenact his revenge upon Allie. Zeke has been taken by Sarren and before Allie can save him, they discover a video recording of Zeke being tortured by none other than Sarren, who still does not know of the cure in Zeke's blood. Sarren tortures Zeke into telling him where Eden is which Zeke inevitably gives into. In his last moments, Zeke professes his love for Allie and his hopes of forgiveness from God when Sarren tells them camera of his true intentions, to release the outbreak in Eden. The book ends with Allie swearing to protect Eden and avenge Zeke.

== Book list ==
1. The Immortal Rules (2012)
2. The Eternity Cure (2013)
3. The Forever Song (2014)
4. 'The Dawn Of Eden' (July 2013) https://www.overdrive.com/media/1341822/dawn-of-eden>

== Reception ==
Critical reception for the series has been mainly positive, with RT Book Reviews giving a positive review for the first two books in the series. Publishers Weekly gave a positive review for The Immortal Rules, calling it "a fresh and imaginative thrill-ride". The Immortal Rules was also a "YALSA Best Fiction for Young Adults" for 2013.
