= Iron Queen =

Iron Queen may refer to:

- A character and a novel in The Iron Fey book series
- Nickname of New Birmingham, Texas
- An epithet of Persephone used in Fitzgerald's translation of Odissey
- An iron deposit in the Middleback Range by Iron Knob, Australia
- Iron Queen (Regina Ferrum) in Sonic the Hedgehog (Archie Comics)
- SS Iron Queen, ferry sunk at Gallipolis, Ohio in 1895
