= 78th World Science Fiction Convention =

78th Worldcon (2020)

CoNZealand, the 78th World Science Fiction Convention
- Genre: Science fiction
- Dates: 29 July – 2 August 2020
- Venue: virtual / telepresence
- Location: Wellington (virtual)
- Country: New Zealand
- Previous event: Dublin 2019
- Next event: DisCon III
- Website: conzealand.nz (archived)

The 78th World Science Fiction Convention (Worldcon), also known as CoNZealand, was held from 29 July to 2 August 2020. It was planned to be held at the TSB Arena and Shed 6, Intercontinental Hotel, Michael Fowler Center, in Wellington, New Zealand. However, due to the COVID-19 pandemic, the organizers announced in March 2020 that it would be held as a virtual convention, with no on-site attendance.

== Participants ==
=== Guests of Honour ===
- Mercedes Lackey and Larry Dixon
- Greg Broadmore
- Rose Mitchell
- George R. R. Martin (toastmaster)

== Awards ==
The World Science Fiction Society administers and presents the Hugo Awards, the oldest and most noteworthy award for science fiction. Selection of the recipients is by vote of the Worldcon members. Categories include novels and short fiction, artwork, dramatic presentations, and various professional and fandom activities.

Other awards may be presented at Worldcon at the discretion of the individual convention committee. This has often included the national SF awards of the host country, such as the Japanese Seiun Awards as part of Nippon 2007, and the Prix Aurora Awards as part of Anticipation in 2009. The Astounding Award for Best New Writer and the Sidewise Award, though not sponsored by the Worldcon, are usually presented, as well as the Chesley Awards, the Prometheus Award, and others. In 2021, the Nommo Awards began presenting at Worldcon.

=== 2020 Hugo Awards ===
The winners were:

- Best Novel: A Memory Called Empire, by Arkady Martine
- Best Novella: This Is How You Lose the Time War, by Amal El-Mohtar and Max Gladstone
- Best Novelette: "Emergency Skin", by N. K. Jemisin
- Best Short Story: "As the Last I May Know", by S. L. Huang
- Best Series: The Expanse, by James S. A. Corey
- Best Related Work: "2019 John W. Campbell Award Acceptance Speech", by Jeannette Ng
- Best Graphic Story: LaGuardia, written by Nnedi Okorafor, art by Tana Ford, colours by James Devlin
- Best Dramatic Presentation, Long Form: Good Omens, written by Neil Gaiman, directed by Douglas Mackinnon
- Best Dramatic Presentation, Short Form: The Good Place: "The Answer", written by Daniel Schofield, directed by Valeria Migliassi Collins
- Best Professional Editor, Long Form: Navah Wolfe
- Best Professional Editor, Short Form: Ellen Datlow
- Best Professional Artist: John Picacio
- Best Semiprozine: Uncanny Magazine
- Best Fanzine: The Book Smugglers
- Best Fancast: Our Opinions Are Correct, presented by Annalee Newitz and Charlie Jane Anders
- Best Fan Writer: Bogi Takács
- Best Fan Artist: Elise Matthesen

=== Other awards ===
The winners were:

- Lodestar Award for Best Young Adult Book: Catfishing on CatNet, by Naomi Kritzer
- Astounding Award for Best New Writer: R. F. Kuang

== Site selection ==
New Zealand in 2020 was the only bid that officially filed to host the 78th World Science Fiction Convention, and its selection was confirmed by vote of the members of the 76th World Science Fiction Convention in San José.

After the vote, the bid announced the name of their convention was CoNZealand, and that it was to be held on 29 July–2 August 2020, in Wellington. The announcement was accompanied by a reveal video announcing the Guests of Honour, and a short message from Jacinda Ardern, the Prime Minister of New Zealand.

== See also ==
- Hugo Award
- Science fiction
- Speculative fiction
- World Science Fiction Society
- Worldcon

Preceded by 77th World Science Fiction Convention; Dublin 2019 in Dublin, Ireland (2019)	List of Worldcons; 78th World Science Fiction Convention; CoNZealand in Wellington, New Zealand (2020)	Succeeded by 79th World Science Fiction Convention; Discon III in Washington, D.C., United States (2021)
