= Rabbit Test (short story) =

2022 short story by Samantha Mills

"Rabbit Test" is a 2022 science fiction short story by Samantha Mills, exploring the history of and future of access to abortion. It was first published in Uncanny Magazine.

== Synopsis ==
In 2091, Grace is 17 years old, and abortion is totally banned. When her government-mandated menstrual tracker implant automatically administers a pregnancy test, her life changes. The story follows her over the next several decades, interspersed with vignettes about the history of abortion and pregnancy tests, going back millennia.

== Reception ==
"Rabbit Test" won the Nebula Award for Best Short Story of 2022, the 2023 Theodore Sturgeon Award, and the 2023 Hugo Award for Best Short Story. (Note: Mills subsequently disavowed the award due to the controversy regarding the ballot.)

Locus found the story to be "worthwhile reading", but noted that "some may find it too didactic". Library Journal called it "frighteningly prescient". In the Los Angeles Review of Books, Niall Harrison lauded it as "one of the most powerful recent examples of rapid-response science fiction" and "an incandescent and unashamed polemic that distills the bitter aftermath of 2022's Dobbs v. Jackson Women's Health Organization [decision] into a few thousand words." Strange Horizons praised it as "fierce and formidable" and "furiously sharp", and noted that in addition to being a story, it is also "an illuminating history lesson about abortion and reproductive rights".

Mills has described the story's success as "wonderful, if bittersweet", specifying that she would "prefer if a story like this didn't resonate with anyone".

== Translations ==
Spanish: El test de la coneja. Translated by María Albalajedo. Barcelona: Editorial Crononauta. ASIN B0DM4MRNYV.
