= Hai Ya =

Chinese science fiction writer

Qin Zhou (Chinese: 秦舟), born 1990 in Xiangtan, Hunan, is a Chinese science fiction author who writes under the pseudonym Hai Ya (Chinese: 海漄).

A financial services worker living in Shenzhen, he won the 2023 Hugo Award for Best Novelette for his 2022 story "The Space-Time Painter".
