= Maeve Clancy =

Irish illustrator and artist

- Education: National College of Art and Design

Maeve Clancy is an Irish illustrator and artist working on stage design and graphic novels based out of Dublin.

== Life ==
Clancy worked as a set designer for film and tv. She has also written and illustrated webcomics and theatre plays using paper cut out techniques she developed. In 2018 she was Visual Artist in Residence in Contemporary Drawing at Mary Immaculate College Limerick. She works on commissions such as the installation at the National Trust site, Barrington Court, completed while she was the artist in residence there as well as that done at St John the Baptist Boys National School in Clontarf, Dublin.
