= Jeff Somers =

Jeff Somers is an American science fiction author from New Jersey.

== Literary career ==
Since 1995, Somers has published his zine The Inner Swine and has been a prolific contributor to alt.zines. The 21st century has seen Somers's transformation from an observational essayist into a science fiction writer of no small talent, "a gifted craftsman" with a "funky wit." His first novel, Lifers was soon followed by the dystopian Avery Cates series. His novels are published in the US and the UK by Orbit Books. Somers has also been called one of the "promising lesser lights" of mystery writing

== Critical attention ==
According to one critic, Jeff Somers' first novel Lifers has an "undernourished plot," although the same critic praises Somers's character observations.

Somers' novel The Electric Church was widely praised on its publication. Booklist wrote, "Somers' stunning debut introduces one of the genre's most promising newcomers." Library Journal called it "a dark future of high tech and low dreams in an action-filled noir thriller reminiscent of Blade Runner." Publishers Weekly praised the characters but was less enthusiastic about the plot, writing, "Somers's [sic] plot sprints along through the nicely detailed (if slightly unoriginal) world, but the characters are the real prize in this entertaining near-future noir."

In 2009 one of Somers' short stories Drum Trial was selected as 1st Runner Up for Best Science Fiction Story 2500 to 6999 words in the "Best Of" contest from Strange, Weird & Wonderful Magazine.

== Bibliography ==
=== The Avery Cates Series ===
1. The Electric Church (2007)
2. The Digital Plague (2008)
3. The Eternal Prison (2009)
4. The Terminal State (2010)
5. The Final Evolution (2011)
6. "The Shattered Gears" (short story, 2014)
7. "The Iron Island" (short story, 2015)
8. "The Pale" (short story, 2015)
9. "The Walled City" (short story, 2015)
10. "The City Lord" (short story, 2016)
11. "The Bey" (short story, 2016)
12. The Shattered Gears (short story collection, 2016)
13. The Kendish Hit (2017)
14. The Burning City (short story collection, 2020)

=== The Ustari Cycle ===
1. Trickster (2014)
2. Fixer (prequel eBook) (2014)
3. We Are Not Good People (2014)

=== Other works ===
- The Ruiner (2014)
- Chum (2013)
- Lifers (2001)
- The Freaks Are Winning (2002)
- Blood and Splendor: Sliders Special (1997 Sliders Comic Book Co-writer)

=== Writing & Publishing Guides ===
- Writing Without Rules: How to Write & Sell a Novel Without Guidelines, Experts, or (Occasionally) Pants (2018)

== Digital Friction ==
- The Electric Church (an Alternate Reality Game)
- Twitter Fiction
- The Eternal Prison Text Adventure
