= The Iron Fey =

Book series by Julie Kagawa

Iron Fey
- The Iron King; The Iron Daughter; The Iron Queen; The Iron Knight; The Lost Prince; The Iron Traitor; The Iron Warrior; The Iron Legends
- Author: Julie Kagawa
- Country: United States
- Language: English
- Genre: Fantasy
- Publisher: Harlequin Teen
- Published: 1 February 2010 – 25 October 2015

The Iron Fey is a book series written by Julie Kagawa, a New York Times bestselling author. This series follows Meghan Chase, a girl who finds herself forced into the world of the Fey, including characters from William Shakespeare's A Midsummer Night's Dream. The books series was published by Harlequin Teen from 2010 to 2012, including several short stories tying into the main four books in the series. There is a spin-off series, The Iron Fey: Call of the Forgotten Trilogy, as well as the Evenfall Trilogy.

== The Iron Fey ==
=== Novels ===
1	The Iron King (2010)
1.5	Winter's Passage (novella)
2	The Iron Daughter (2010)
3	The Iron Queen (2011)
3.5	Summer's Crossing (novella)
4	The Iron Knight (2011)
4.5	Iron's Prophecy (novella)
Call of the Forgotten Series
5	The Lost Prince (2012)
6	The Iron Traitor (2013)
7	The Iron Warrior (2015)
Evenfall Series
8	The Iron Raven (2021)
9	The Iron Sword (2022)
10	The Iron Vow (2023)
Other
-	The Iron Legends (Winter's Passage, Summer's Crossing, Iron's Prophecy, Guide to the Iron Fey)
	The Guide to the Iron Fey
	Survival Guide to the Nevernever

=== Characters ===
==== Main ====
- Meghan Chase: Half-fey daughter of Oberon and queen of the Iron fey. She is Ethan's older sister, married to Ash and mother of Keirran.

- Ash (Ashallyn'darkmyr Tallyn): Prince of the Winter Court and consort of Meghan)

- Puck (Robin Goodfellow): Lord Oberon/The Summer Court’s jester

- Grimalkin

- Ethan Chase: Meghan's younger brother, who is the protagonist in The Lost Prince, The Iron Traitor, and The Iron Warrior. He is married to Mackenzie St. James.

==== Recurring ====
King Oberon

Queen Titania

Queen Mab

Prince Keirran

=== Setting ===
The mortal realm (Megan's high school, Megan's house, etc.) and the Nevernever/faery realm where the faery folk live.

== Plot summaries ==
=== The Iron King ===
Meghan Chase becomes ensnared within the world of the fey when her younger brother is taken and replaced with a changeling. Once there, she discovers that her father is, in fact, the King of the Summer Oberon. She is detained in his court for some time, along with her friend Robbie who turns out to be Robin Goodfellow (aka Puck). It is there, during a festival in which the Summer and Winter courts come together that she meets Ash, the son of Mab. A chimera attacks the festival and the Winter court blames the Summer Court and leaves. Meghan decides to ask Grimalkin to be her guide to the Winter court because she believes that Mab has her little brother. She is caught by Ash, who is sent to bring her to the Winter Court so that they will have some leverage over Oberon. However, she is soon taken by the great Iron Horse and is told by him that the Iron King has her little brother. Later, she is rescued by Ash who agrees to help her through the Iron realm if she will come peacefully with him to the Winter Court. She agrees, and Robin Goodfellow joins them but is injured and left behind to heal along the way. Ash and Meghan soon develop an attraction to one another. When confronting the Iron King Meghan kills him and unknowingly inherits powers of the Iron Realm. She recovers her brother and brings him home. The book concludes with Ash appearing to take her to the Winter Court.

=== The Iron Daughter ===
Meghan's adventures continue with the second installment of the series. She starts out in the Winter Court where Ash pretends to have no relationship with her. She attempts to convince Queen Mab about the existence of the Iron Court, but Mab does not believe her. When the Summer and Winter Courts next meet to exchange the Scepter of Seasons, one of Mab's sons is murdered by an Iron Fey and the scepter is stolen, but Mab blames the Summer Court. Meghan must go retrieve the scepter and prevent a war between the Summer and Winter courts. After Ash and Meghan find and return the scepter to the Winter Court, Ash declares his love for Meghan and is banished into exile. Meghan follows him, and she too is banished.

=== The Iron Queen ===
Meghan and Ash have been living in exile when they are given the opportunity to have their banishment lifted. All Meghan has to do is kill the new Iron King. She succeeds but ends up getting stabbed in the process. She then finds a way to heal herself by combining her Summer and Iron magic together and she declares herself the Iron Queen.

=== The Iron Knight ===
Ash, unable to live in a world of iron, embarks on a quest to become human so that he can stay with Meghan. He must gain a soul to do this and must face several challenges to find what it really means to be human. He succeeds through these tasks and gains a soul. But he is not completely human, nor completely Winter Fey, so he will live forever like Meghan, but remain unharmed by the Iron.

=== The Lost Prince ===
That is Ethan Chase's unbreakable rule. Until the fey he avoids at all costs—including his reputation—begin to disappear, and Ethan is attacked. Now he must change the rules to protect his family. To save a girl he never thought he'd dare to fall for.

Ethan thought he had protected himself from his older sister's world—the land of Faery. His previous time in the Iron Realm left him with nothing but fear and disgust for the world Meghan Chase has made her home, a land of myth and talking cats, of magic and seductive enemies. But when destiny comes for Ethan, there is no escape from a danger long, long forgotten.

=== The Iron Traitor ===
In the real world, when you vanish into thin air for a week, people tend to notice.

But when your name is Ethan Chase and your sister is one of the most powerful faeries in the Nevernever, "normal" simply isn't to be. For Ethan's nephew, Keirran, is missing, and may be on the verge of doing something unthinkable in the name of saving his own love. Something that will fracture the human and faery worlds forever, and give rise to the dangerous fey known as the Forgotten. As Ethan's and Keirran's fates entwine and Keirran slips further into darkness, Ethan's next choice may decide the fate of them all.

=== The Iron Warrior ===
The Iron Prince—my nephew—betrayed us all.

He killed me.

Then, I woke up.

Waking after a month on the brink of death, Ethan Chase is stunned to learn that the veil concealing the fey from human sight was temporarily torn away. Although humankind's glimpse of the world of Faery was brief, the human world has been cast into chaos, and the emotion and glamour produced by fear and wonder has renewed the tremendous power of the Forgotten Queen. Now, she is at the forefront of an uprising against the courts of Summer and Winter—a reckoning that will have cataclysmic effects on the Nevernever.

Leading the Lady's Forgotten Army is Keirran himself: Ethan's nephew, and the traitor son of the Iron Queen, Meghan Chase. To stop Keirran, Ethan must disobey his sister once again as he and his girlfriend, Kenzie, search for answers long forgotten. In the face of unprecedented evil and unfathomable power, Ethan's enemies must become his allies, and the world of the fey will be changed forevermore.
