= Worldcon =

Annual convention for science fiction and fantasy

Worldcon World Science Fiction Convention
- Status: Active
- Genre: Science fiction, fantasy convention
- Location: Convention location changes every year
- Country: Several, though mainly the United States
- Inaugurated: July 2, 1939
- Filing status: Non-profit, unincorporated association
- Website: worldcon.org

The World Science Fiction Convention, branded as Worldcon, is a science fiction convention and the annual convention of the World Science Fiction Society (WSFS). It has been held each year since 1939 (except for the years 1942 to 1945, during World War II). The members of each Worldcon are the members of WSFS, and vote both to select the site of the Worldcon two years later, and to select the winners of the annual Hugo Awards, which are presented at each convention.

== Activities ==
Activities and events at the convention typically include:

- Activities to fund fan and external charities (fan funds auctions, blood drives, etc.);
- Art shows presenting paintings, drawings, sculpture and other work, primarily concerning science fiction and fantasy themes;
- Autographing sessions, literary beer or coffee meetings, "Walks with the Stars", and other chances to meet favorite science fiction and fantasy professionals;
- Awards ceremonies:
  - Hugo Awards, Astounding Award for Best New Writer, and Lodestar Award for Best Young Adult Book;
  - Chesley Awards .
- Costuming – both formal competition (the "Masquerade") and casual "hall costumes" or cosplay;
- Dancing – one or more dances with live music or a DJ. (LoneStarCon 3 had three dances in 2013, including a Firefly Shindig contradance and a steampunk dance.);
- Exhibits – including photos of prominent fans and authors, historical displays, information about space and science, local information etc.
- Huckster room, the fan term for a dealers' or vendors' room – a large hall where fans can buy books, knickknacks, games, comic books, movies, jewelry, costumes and other goods;
- Fan lounge (sometimes called the "Fanzine Lounge") – A place for reading, exchanging, contributing to and talking about fanzines;
- Fan tables – where fan organizations and representatives of other conventions promote their groups;
- Filk and other musical performances, music circles, and workshops;
- Movies – an independent film festival, and other movies rooms showing science fiction movies, television shows, etc.;
- Gaming – live-action and tabletop board games, card games, and role-playing games;
- Live theatrical performances (Klingon opera, productions of Rossum's Universal Robots, etc.);
- Panel discussions on a wide range of topics pertaining to speculative fiction (SF) literature; movies, audio and other media; art; graphic stories; fandom and fannish hobbies; science, technology, and society; costuming, gaming, and music;
- Socializing in the "con suite", convention bars, and at parties (typically given by other conventions or bidders, clubs, publishers/magazines, and by private individuals);
- Speeches or other presentations by the guests of honor and other program participants;
- Other business of the World Science Fiction Society, including voting on the location of future Worldcons and North American Science Fiction Conventions (NASFiCs, which occur when the Worldcon is overseas) and any changes to the WSFS Constitution, which are made at WSFS business meetings during the convention.

== Awards ==
The World Science Fiction Society administers and presents the Hugo Awards, the oldest and most noteworthy award for science fiction. Selection of the recipients is by vote of the Worldcon members. Categories include novels and short fiction, artwork, dramatic presentations, and various professional and fandom activities.

Other awards may be presented at Worldcon at the discretion of the individual convention committee. This has often included the national SF awards of the host country, such as the Japanese Seiun Awards as part of Nippon 2007, and the Prix Aurora Awards as part of Anticipation in 2009. The Astounding Award for Best New Writer and the Sidewise Award, though not sponsored by the Worldcon, are usually presented, as well as the Chesley Awards, the Prometheus Award, and others. In 2021, the Nommo Awards began presenting at Worldcon.

== Guests of honor ==
Each Worldcon committee selects a number of guests of honor (or "GoHs") for the convention. Typically there is an author (aka "Writer" or "Pro") and a fan guest of honor. Many conventions also have artist, editor, and science guests, and most have a toastmaster for major events, such as the opening and closing ceremonies and the Hugo award ceremony. A few conventions have had two or even three author guests.

While other conventions may select guests on the basis of current popularity, Worldcons typically select guests of honor as an acknowledgement of significant lifetime contribution to the field; while these are often well-known figures, some committees choose lesser-known figures precisely because the committee feels the guest's accomplishments deserve more recognition from the community. Selection is treated by authors, fans, and others as a recognition of lifetime achievement. As such, the tradition is to award it only to those who have been making significant contributions for at least 20 years. Guests of honor generally receive travel expenses, membership, and a small per diem from the convention, but no speaking fees.

In order to announce guests immediately after site selection, Worldcon bid committees select one or more guests before the site selection vote. Fans consider it inappropriate for bids to compete on the basis of their chosen guests (so as to avoid having someone chosen by a losing bid feeling that fandom had voted against them personally), so bids do not reveal who their guests are until after the vote, and losing bids generally never reveal who they invited. This is usually treated with the same discretion as the Hugo Awards, where only a few people might know in advance who the guests will be.

== World Science Fiction Society ==
The name "Worldcon" is owned by the World Science Fiction Society (WSFS), an unincorporated literary society whose purpose is to promote interest in science fiction. WSFS has no standing officers, only small standing committees, and a large membership composed of the members of the current Worldcon. Its main activities are running the selection (voting) process for the annual convention and various awards. The conventions themselves are run by non-profit, volunteer fan organizations, who bid to host the event.

The WSFS constitution itself is discussed and amended by the annual general meeting, known as the "business meeting", held at the Worldcon, usually as three morning sessions on successive days. All attending members of the Worldcon may attend, participate, and vote at the Business Meeting, although in practice only a small number of the members actually do so. The WSFS constitution includes rules for site selection, for the Hugo Awards, and for amending itself. The business meeting also empanels a number of ad hoc committees to deal with review of amendments and with certain administrative functions.

The only permanent ("standing") committee of WSFS (as opposed to the Business Meeting) is the Mark Protection Committee (MPC), which is responsible for maintaining the society's trademarks and domain names.

== Site selection ==
Historically, most Worldcons were held in the United States; however, beginning in the later part of the 20th century an increasing number of them have been hosted in other countries. In 2017, the 75th World Science Fiction Convention ("Worldcon 75") was held in Helsinki, Finland; the 2018 Worldcon was held in San Jose, California, and the 2019 Worldcon was held in Dublin, Ireland. The 2020 Worldcon was scheduled to be in New Zealand; however, due to the COVID-19 pandemic, it was a virtual event (accessed by internet only).

The first Worldcon to be held outside the US was the sixth, in 1948 in Toronto, Ontario, Canada, and the first outside North America was the 15th World Science Fiction Convention, in 1957 in Bayswater, London. The first held in a country where English was not the primary language was the Heicon '70, the 28th World Science Fiction Convention held in Heidelberg, West Germany. The 2007 Worldcon in Yokohama, Japan, was the first to be held in Asia. Other non-US Worldcons held in the 21st century have included: the 2003 Worldcon in Toronto, Ontario, Canada; the 2005 Worldcon, held in Glasgow, Scotland; the 2009 Worldcon, in Montreal, Quebec, Canada; the 2010 Worldcon, in Melbourne, Australia; the 2014 Worldcon, in London, United Kingdom; the 2017 Worldcon, in Helsinki, Finland; the 2023 Worldcon, in Chengdu, China; and the 2024 Worldcon, in Glasgow, Scotland.

Sites for future Worldcons are determined by voting of the Worldcon membership. Worldcons through 1970 were selected one year in advance, from 1971 through 1986 two years in advance, from 1987 to 2007, three years in advance, then from 2008 to the present, two years in advance again. For example, during the 2011 Worldcon in Reno, San Antonio was selected to host the 2013 Worldcon. The rules changes to lengthen or shorten the period were implemented by selecting two future Worldcons at the 1969 and 1984 conventions and by having the 2005 convention not select any.

To ensure that the Worldcon is relocated to different locations, the WSFS constitution requires that the proposed sites must all be at least 500 miles (800 km) away from the site of the convention at which the selection vote happens.

When a Worldcon is held outside of North America, a North American Science Fiction Convention (NASFiC) may also be held within North America that same year. Since 1975, whenever a Worldcon site outside North America is selected, WSFS administers a parallel site selection process for the NASFiC, voted on by WSFS members at the Worldcon (or NASFiC if there is one) held one year prior to the prospective NASFiC. With the 2014 Worldcon being held in the United Kingdom, members at the 2013 Worldcon in San Antonio chose Detroit to be the site of the 2014 NASFiC and Spokane, Washington, as the site of the 2015 Worldcon.

In 2020, The 78th Worldcon was held in Wellington, New Zealand. However, due to the COVID-19 pandemic, organizers announced during March 2020 that it would be a "virtual" con with attendees and panelists using video technologies to participate.

In 2021, The 79th Worldcon took place in Washington, D.C. In 2022, the 80th Worldcon was held in Chicago, Illinois. This was announced at the 2020 Worldcon, chosen by the members of the 78th Worldcon. Jeddah, Saudi Arabia was the other competing site. In 2020, a group of writers and officers of the Worldcon signed an open letter against Saudi Arabia's bid to host the 2022 World Science Fiction Convention, citing human rights abuses and discriminatory laws.

Chengdu, China hosted the 81st Worldcon in 2023. It was the second Worldcon to be held in Asia after the 65th Worldcon in Japan in 2007. Over 100 authors, including Hugo winners and Uyghur writers, signed an open letter calling for the hosting to be reconsidered due to ongoing human rights violations in the Uyghur region. The choice of location was also criticized due to the effects of the Chinese government's censorship regime and the exclusion of authors publicly critical of human rights in China such as R. F. Kuang, Xiran Jay Zhao, and Neil Gaiman.

The 82nd Worldcon was held in Glasgow, Scotland in 2024. The 83rd Worldcon was held in Seattle, Washington in 2025. Jeddah, Saudi Arabia reasserted its bid for 2026, but the bid was replaced by one for Cairo, Egypt; the site ultimately chosen was Anaheim, California, which was the only official bid at the time of voting. Montreal and Tel Aviv both submitted bids for 2027, but Tel Aviv later suspended their bid "due to the situation in Israel".

== Convention committees ==
As WSFS itself is an unincorporated society, each Worldcon is organized by a separate committee (usually) legally incorporated in the local jurisdiction; in the United States, these are usually organized as 501(c)(3) non-profit corporations, while in the United Kingdom, they are usually operated by companies limited by guarantee. The local organizers may be standalone, one-time committees (organized to hold the one event and then disbanded afterwards), or they may be organized by an existing local group. A few groups, such as MCFI in Boston, SFSFC (San Francisco Science Fiction Conventions, Inc.) in northern California, and SCIFI (Southern California Institute for Fan Interests Inc.) in southern California are permanent corporations established to manage Worldcons (or other one-off or rotating conventions) in different years in the same geographical area.

Like most non-media science fiction conventions, all Worldcons are managed entirely by volunteers, with no paid staff. Senior committee members typically devote hundreds of hours (not to mention thousands of dollars in travel expenses in some cases) in preparation for a particular convention. While each convention is managed separately by the local committee, an informal and self-selected group of volunteers constitute the "Permanent Floating Worldcon Committee" who volunteer for many Worldcons in different years; this group offers a measure of institutional continuity to otherwise disparate legal organizations.

Recent Worldcons have had budgets running in excess of a million dollars. The main source of revenue is convention membership, but Worldcons also collect fees from exhibiting dealers and artists and advertisers in publications, and some conventions manage to attract sponsorships of as much as 5% of total income. The main expenses are facilities rental and related costs, then (if possible) membership reimbursements to program participants and volunteers, then publications, audiovisual equipment rental, and hospitality. Traditionally, all members (except for guests of honor) must pay for their membership; if the convention makes an adequate surplus after covering operating expenses, full or partial membership reimbursements are paid back to volunteers after the convention. Most Worldcons have a small surplus, which the rules of WSFS suggest be disbursed "for the benefit of WSFS as a whole;" typically at least half of any surplus is donated to future Worldcons, a tradition termed "pass-along funds".

Because of their size, Worldcons have two layers of management between the chairperson and the staff. "Departments" operate a specific convention function, while "divisions" coordinate the work of several departments. Department heads (sometimes called "area heads") have one or more deputies plus a large staff, or they may have no staff at all. Most Worldcons have between five and twelve division heads who form the convention executive group.

== See also ==
- List of Worldcons
- List of Worldcons by city
