= An Infinite Summer =

1979 collection of science fiction short stories by Christopher Priest

- First edition (UK)
- Author: Christopher Priest
- Language: English
- Genre: Slipstream
- Publisher: Faber and Faber (UK); Charles Scribner's Sons (US)
- Publication date: June 1979 (UK); Oct 1979 (US)
- Publication place: United Kingdom
- Media type: Print (hardback & paperback)
- ISBN: 978-0-571-11343-9
- OCLC: 5957731

An Infinite Summer is the second collection of science fiction short stories by British writer Christopher Priest and the first of his books to collect stories set in the Dream Archipelago. The stories had all previously been published in various anthologies and magazines; they may be described, somewhat interchangeably, as science fiction, fantasy literature, metafiction and macabre.

== Stories ==
- "An Infinite Summer" (1976)
- "Whores" (1978)
- "Palely Loitering" (1979)
- "The Negation" (1978)
- "The Watched" (1978)

The material in the collection may be divided into two types: the first, namely "An Infinite Summer" and "Palely Loitering" are more straightforward works of science fiction involving time travel, while the other three are early parts of Priest's "Dream Archipelago" sequence, described by John Clute as "intensify[ing] the sense that Priest's landscapes had now become forms of expression of the psyche, and are of intense interest for the dream-like convolutions of psychic terrain so displayed." Priest would later revisit the setting at length in novels such as The Affirmation and, in 1999, these early stories would be revised and reassembled with other material as The Dream Archipelago.

"An Infinite Summer" was originally published in the anthology Andromeda 1 (1976, ed. Peter Weston, ISBN 0-86007-891-4). A time travel story, it was reprinted in later anthologies, such as Trips in Time (1977, ed. Robert Silverberg, ISBN 0-8407-6574-6), and in translation. It was selected for The Best Science Fiction of the Year 6 by editor Terry Carr. Priest says that he interrupted the writing of his 1976 novel The Space Machine ("somewhere in Chapter 13, to be precise"), and chose to publish the story separately "because there was one strong feeling that would not fit in the novel: the sense that layers of time exist, that places do not change so much as people."

In August, 1940, protagonist Thomas Lloyd daily visits the Thames Bridge in Richmond, London, England. He spots "freezers" around the park; freezers is his term for people from an unknown future who, for unknown reasons, will occasionally use a device to freeze people out of time. These frozen people remain visible only to the freezers and to others, like Thomas, who were once frozen. In June, 1903, Thomas was frozen at the very moment of proposing to a lovely young lady, Sarah, who accepted him. Thomas remained frozen in this tableau until 1935, after which he finds that the frozen are considered, by their contemporaries, to have vanished. He is now disinherited and poor; he learns that freezing may "erode" after minutes or years; and he finds what work he can in the vicinity so that he may visit Sarah, in her radiant immobility, every day. "Thomas Lloyd, of neither the past nor the present, saw himself as a product of both, and as a victim of the future." After long, patient waiting, he sees Sarah unfreeze during The Blitz. The freezers have watched Thomas; when Sarah awakes, blissful but baffled by the bombing, they restore their tableau, presumably so that the lovers will wake again in a kinder future. If so, this is one of Priest's happier endings.

"Whores" was written immediately prior to his novel A Dream of Wessex. It was originally published in the anthology New Dimensions: Science Fiction: 8 (1978, ed. Robert Silverberg, ISBN 0-06-013792-4). It was reprinted in later anthologies and in translation. It was selected for Best Science Fiction Stories of the Year: Eighth Annual Collection (1979) by Gardner Dozois.

"Whores" is a nightmare from the vagina dentata school of folk tales. It is narrated by a soldier, recovering from a blast of "the enemy's synaesthetic gas", who is sent to the Archipelago island of Winho to convalesce. There he hopes to find a young prostitute whom he had loved, Slenje, but she is dead. He is seduced by Elva, who has been "experimented upon" when Winho was occupied by enemy troops. According to her, their enemies are the real whores, not prostitutes like herself. He enjoys the sex, but several incidents disturb him beyond his momentary flashes of synesthesia: Elva's legs are bizarrely scarred, her teeth have been filed into points; when her year-old boy in the next room cries because he has hurt his hand, Elva soothes him by sucking his little hand into her mouth; while Elva pleasures the soldier, he "visualized her as some monstrous animal, chewing into my gut. It was the most hideous image of woman." The next day, boarding a ferry, the soldier realizes that Elva had teased his torso with her teeth; these are now becoming open wounds. When he reaches into his pocket to pay the ferryman, a tiny child's hand, severed at the wrist, seizes his fingers and will not let go. In his Introduction, Priest writes that he wrote the story at Christmas. "There the resemblance to good cheer ends, as you will discover, and in retrospect think I must have eaten too much plum duff."

"Palely Loitering" was originally published in The Magazine of Fantasy & Science Fiction in the January 1979 issue; Priest reaped the cover illustration by Ron Walotsky. Anthologist Terry Carr selected the story for The Best Science Fiction Novellas of the Year #2 (1980; ISBN 0-345-28792-4), and Mike Ashley chose it likewise for The Mammoth Book of Time Travel SF (2013; ISBN 978-1-4721-0025-2). The story has been translated several times.

The title is harvested from the ballad La Belle Dame sans Merci by John Keats; the relevant lines run:

1 O what can ail thee, knight-at-arms,
2 Alone and palely loitering?
. . .
41 I saw their starved lips in the gloam,
42 With horrid warning gapèd wide,
43 And I awoke and found me here,
44 On the cold hill's side.
45 And this is why I sojourn here,
46 Alone and palely loitering...

"Palely Loitering" earned the BSFA Award for Best Short Fiction in 1979. It was nominated for the Hugo Award for Best Novelette in 1980, and was further nominated for the 1980 Locus Award for Best Novella.

Priest remarked of "Palely Loitering" that it "was written soon after I returned from a long and very happy stay in Melbourne, Australia. It was an attempt to think myself back into a European sensibility; visiting Australia is like seeing the past and future simultaneously, and the familiar and unfamiliar at once."

"The Negation" was originally published in Anticipations, a 1978 anthology edited by Priest; it has been collected here in An Infinite Summer and in his The Dream Archipelago (1999). In French translation, it has been anthologized in Le livre d'or de la Science-Fiction: Christopher Priest (1980) and L'Archipel du Rêve (1981). Of his collection An Infinite Summer, Priest wrote, "'The Negation' also fits into the [Dream Archipelago] series, although in a slightly different way."

Dik, an eighteen-year-old policeman, looks eagerly forward to the visit of novelist Moylita Kaine, author of The Affirmation (the title of Priest's own 1981 metafictional novel). From her and from the events surrounding her visit, he learns more about the nature of his world and about the limitations that even novelists may face.

"The Watched" was first published in The Magazine of Fantasy & Science Fiction in the April 1978 issue; it was nominated for the 1979 Hugo Award for Best Novella and the 1979 Locus Award for Best Novella. Anthologist Terry Carr selected the story for The Best Science Fiction Novellas of the Year #1 (1979; ISBN 978-0-345-28084-8). Priest has said that he wrote "The Watched" immediately after finishing A Dream of Wessex.
