= The Best Science Fiction of the Year 6 =

1977 anthology edited by Terry Carr

The Best Science Fiction of the Year #6
- hardback edition
- Author: Edited by Terry Carr
- Cover artist: Fred Marcellino
- Language: English
- Series: The Best Science Fiction of the Year
- Genre: Science fiction
- Publisher: Holt, Rinehart and Winston
- Publication date: 1977
- Publication place: United States
- Media type: Print (paperback)
- Pages: 388 pp.
- ISBN: 0-345-25758-8
- Preceded by: The Best Science Fiction of the Year 5
- Followed by: The Best Science Fiction of the Year 7

The Best Science Fiction of the Year #6 is an anthology of science fiction short stories edited by Terry Carr, the sixth volume in a series of sixteen. It was first published in paperback by Del Rey Books and in hardcover by Holt, Rinehart and Winston in July 1977.

The book collects eleven novellas, novelettes and short stories by various science fiction authors, with an introduction, notes and concluding essays by Carr and Charles N. Brown. The stories were previously published in 1976 in the magazines The Magazine of Fantasy & Science Fiction, Galaxy, and Amazing Science Fiction, and the anthologies Andromeda 1, New Dimensions Science Fiction Number 6, Future Power, Orbit 18, Universe 6, and Stellar No 2.

== Contents ==
- "Introduction" (Terry Carr)
- "I See You" (Damon Knight)
- "The Phantom of Kansas" (John Varley)
- "Seeing" (Harlan Ellison)
- "The Death of Princes" (Fritz Leiber)
- "The Psychologist Who Wouldn't Do Awful Things to Rats" (James Tiptree, Jr.)
- "The Eyeflash Miracles" (Gene Wolfe)
- "An Infinite Summer" (Christopher Priest)
- "The Highest Dive" (Jack Williamson)
- "Meathouse Man" (George R. R. Martin)
- "Custer's Last Jump" (Steven Utley and Howard Waldrop)
- "The Bicentennial Man" (Isaac Asimov)
- "Recommended Reading - 1976" (Terry Carr)
- "The Science Fiction Year" (Charles N. Brown)

== Reception ==
C. Ben Ostrander reviewed The Best Science Fiction of the Year #6 in The Space Gamer No. 12. Ostrander commented that this "is the only 'Best of...' that truely lives up to its name. There are eleven of the best of the year by Carr's standards, which are high. [...] I don't think anyone can afford to miss what is at least the best SF published in the USA and UK."

== Awards ==
- "I See You" was nominated for the 1977 Hugo Award for Best Short Story and placed second in the 1977 Locus Poll Award for Best Short Story.
- "The Phantom of Kansas" was nominated for the 1977 Hugo Award for Best Novelette and placed fourth in the 1977 Locus Poll Award for Best Novelette.
- "Seeing" placed sixth in the 1977 Locus Poll Award for Best Short Story.
- "The Death of Princes" placed fourth in the 1977 Locus Poll Award for Best Short Story.
- "The Psychologist Who Wouldn't Do Awful Things to Rats" sixth in the 1977 Locus Poll Award for Best Novelette.
- "The Eyeflash Miracles" was nominated for the 1976 Nebula Award for Best Novella and placed fifth in the 1977 Locus Poll Award for Best Novella.
- "An Infinite Summer" placed fourteenth in the 1977 Locus Poll Award for Best Short Story.
- "Meathouse Man" placed eighth in the 1977 Locus Poll Award for Best Novelette
- "Custer's Last Jump" was nominated for the 1976 Nebula Award for Best Novelette and placed seventh in the 1977 Locus Poll Award for Best Novelette
- "The Bicentennial Man" won the 1976 Nebula Award for Best Novelette and the 1977 Hugo Award for Best Novelette, and placed first in the 1977 Locus Poll Award for Best Novelette
