= Bob Leman =

American writer

Robert J. Leman (1922 – August 8, 2006) was an American science fiction and horror short story author, most associated with The Magazine of Fantasy & Science Fiction. He was not published until he was 45, but had been a member of First Fandom before that.

His best-known story is "Window", which has often been reprinted and which was nominated for the Nebula Award for Best Short Story of 1980. It was adapted for an episode of Night Visions, directed by and starring Bill Pullman.

All of Leman's published stories—including the previously unpublished "How Dobbstown Was Saved", which was to have appeared in the Harlan Ellison anthology The Last Dangerous Visions—are collected in the volume Feesters in the Lake and Other Stories (Seattle: Midnight House, 2002. ISBN 0-9707349-5-6). His story "Instructions" was reprinted in chapbook form in 2001 by Tachyon Publications

Several of Leman's stories were translated, illustrated and published in the Polish monthly science fiction magazine Fantastyka in 1990, with a short introductory note from the author.

Leman graduated from the University of Illinois with a degree in political science after he returned from service in Europe, as a field artillery officer, during World War II.
