= The Last Dangerous Visions =

Science fiction short story anthology

- Editor: Harlan Ellison / J. Michael Straczynski (uncredited)
- Language: English
- Series: Dangerous Visions
- Genre: speculative fiction
- Publisher: Blackstone Publishers
- Publication date: October 1, 2024
- Publication place: United States
- Preceded by: Again, Dangerous Visions

The Last Dangerous Visions (often abbreviated TLDV, sometimes as LDV) is a 2024 original speculative fiction anthology following Dangerous Visions (1967) and Again, Dangerous Visions (1972). Like its predecessors, it was edited by American author Harlan Ellison, with introductions to be provided by him. Ellison died in 2018 with the anthology unfinished.

In 2020, the Ellison estate's executor J. Michael Straczynski announced his intention to publish it. It was published by Blackstone Publishers on October 1, 2024.

== Background ==
The third anthology was started but, controversially, failed to be published and became something of a legend in science fiction as the genre's most famous unpublished book. It was originally announced for publication in 1973, but did not see print until over fifty years later. Ellison came under criticism for his treatment of some writers who sold their stories to him, estimated to number around 120. Many of the writers died in the interim between Ellison's initial story acquisitions and the book's eventual publication more than five decades later.

British author Christopher Priest, whose story "An Infinite Summer" had been commissioned for TLDV in 1974 and withdrawn after four months without any response, wrote a lengthy critique of Ellison's failure to complete the project. It was first published by Priest in 1987 as The Last Deadloss Visions, a pun on the title of Priest's fanzine Deadloss where it appeared. It proved so popular that it had two more editions, expanded with reader letters and other events, later in 1987 and 1988. In 1994 it was further expanded as The Book on the Edge of Forever (an allusion to Ellison's Star Trek episode "The City on the Edge of Forever") from American publisher Fantagraphics Books, and was nominated for the Hugo Award for Best Related Work. Priest also released the final draft online.

On June 28, 2018, Ellison died, with the anthology still unfinished.

On November 13, 2020, the Ellison estate's executor J. Michael Straczynski announced that he would oversee the project to publish the book. Straczynski's volume did not include withdrawn stories nor stories "overtaken by real-world events", so the final length was just a sixth of the originally intended, but included new stories from major contemporary science fiction writers as well as work from new authors, including one story from an unpublished writer, Kayo Hartenbaum. The book was advertised as containing "one last, significant work by Harlan which has never been published" which "ties directly into the reason why The Last Dangerous Visions has taken so long to come to light". This turned out to be an essay by Straczynski describing Ellison's battle with (undiagnosed) bipolar disorder. The stories were accompanied by artwork from Tim Kirk (who had been commissioned in the 1970s). The rights to all stories not used reverted to the authors.

== Ellison contents ==
The contents of The Last Dangerous Visions were announced on several occasions, beginning in the January 1973 issue #7 of the semiprozine Alien Critic. Stories were being added, dropped, or substituted between each announced version. The most complete version was announced in 1979; listed were 113 stories by 102 authors, to be collected in three volumes.

=== Contents as of 1979 ===
It was announced in the April 1979 issue of the Locus magazine that the anthology had been sold to Berkley Books, which planned to publish the 645,000 words of fiction in three volumes. A table of contents was published in the June 1979 issue (#222). Story titles are followed by an approximate word count (note that the totals given do not match the sum of individual stories; Ellison may have added his introductions to each volume). Authors marked with a '†' died between the time they submitted their work to Ellison and the actual completed TLDV was released. Stories marked with a '‡' were published elsewhere by the author or their estate, after this announcement was published but before the final completed version of TLDV was released. Stories in bold type were included in the completed TLDV.

==== Book One ====
34 authors, 35 stories, 214,250 words.

1. "Among the Beautiful Bright Children"‡ by James E. Gunn† (9100)
2. "Dark Night in Toyland"‡ by Bob Shaw† (4000) – published in 1988; withdrawn by Shaw's estate after his 1996 death
3. "Living Inside" by Bruce Sterling (2250)
4. "The Bing Bang Blues" by Delbert Casada (2000)
5. "Ponce De Leon's Pants" by Mack Reynolds† (1800)
6. "The True Believer" by A. Bertram Chandler† (7000)
7. "The Bones Do Lie"‡ by Anne McCaffrey† (7000)
8. "Doug, Where Are We? I Don't Know. A Spaceship Maybe" by Grant Carrington (3800)
9. "Child of Mind" by Lisa Tuttle (6800)
10. **"Dark Threshold" by P. C. Hodgell** (1500)
11. **"Falling From Grace" by Ward Moore**† (4000)
12. "The 100 Million Horses of Planet Dada" by Daniel Walther† (both French and English versions) (4200)
13. **"None So Deaf" by Richard E. Peck** (2000)
14. "A Time for Praying" by G. C. Edmondson† (7700)
15. "The Amazonas Link" by James Sutherland (6000)
16. "At the Sign of the Boar's Head Nebula"‡ by Richard Wilson† (47000)
17. "All Creatures Great and Small" by Howard Fast† (1200)
18. "A Night at Madame Mephisto's" by Joseph F. Pumilia (1200)
19. "What Used to be Called Dead"‡ by Leslie A. Fiedler† (2800)
20. "Not All a Dream"‡ by Manly Wade Wellman† (5400)
21. "A Day in the Life of A-420" by Felix C. Gotschalk† (Jacques Goudchaux) (2600)
22. "The Residents of Kingston" by Doris Piserchia† (5000)
23. "Free Enterprise"‡ by Jerry Pournelle† (11000)
24. **"Rundown" by John Morressy**† (1200)
25. "Various Kinds of Conceit"‡ by Arthur Byron Cover (2000)
26. "Son of 'Wild in the Streets'" by Robert Thom† (15800)
27. "Dick and Jane Go to Mars" by Wilson Tucker† (7500)
28. "On the Way to the Woman of Your Dreams" by Jud Newborn under the pen name Raul Judson (3800)
29. "Blackstop" by Gerard Conway (5500)
30. "Ten Times Your Fingers and Double Your Toes"‡ by Craig Strete (3500)
31. "The Names of Yanils"‡ by Chan Davis (9000)
32. "Return to Elf Hill" by Robert Lilly (900)
33. "The Carbon Dream"‡ by Jack Dann (9500)
34. "Dogs' Lives"‡ by Michael Bishop (6000) (since withdrawn by the author)

==== Book Two ====
32 authors, 40 stories, 216,527 words.

1. "Universe on the Turn"‡ by Ian Watson (4200) (subsequently withdrawn by the author)
2. "The Children of Bull Weed" by Gordon Eklund (17000) (some sources title this "The Children of Bull Wood")
3. "Precis of the Rappacini Report"‡ by Anthony Boucher† (850) (with an Afterword by Richard Matheson†)
4. "Grandma, What's the Sky Made Of?" by Susan C. Lette (1500)
5. "A Rousing Explanation of the Events Surrounding My Sister's Death" by David Wise† (1800)
6. "The Dawn Patrol" by P.J. Plauger (10000)
7. "I Had No Head and My Eyes Were Floating Way Up in the Air"‡ by Clifford D. Simak† (6600)
8. "To Have and To Hold"‡ by Langdon Jones (20000)
9. **"The Malibu Fault" by Jonathan Fast** (1750)
10. "√-1 Think, Therefore √-1 Am" by Leonard Isaacs† (1000)
11. "The Taut Arc of Desire" by Philippe Curval (7200) (both French and English versions)
12. "A Journey South"‡ by John Christopher† (21500)
13. "The Return of Agent Black" by Ron Goulart (3800)
14. "The Stone Which the Builders Rejected"‡ by Avram Davidson† (2000)
15. "Signals"‡ by Charles L. Harness† (13125)
16. "Thumbing it on the Beam and Other Magic Melting Moments" by D. M. Rowles (2000)
17. "End" by Raylyn Moore† (9250)
18. "Uncle Tom's Time Machine" by John Jakes† (3000)
19. "Adversaries" by Franklin Fisher† (4700)
20. "Copping Out" by Hank Davis (1000)
21. "Stark and the Star Kings"‡ by Edmond Hamilton† and Leigh Brackett† (10000)
22. **"The Danaan Children Laugh" by Mildred Downey Broxon** (5300)
23. "Play Sweetly, In Harmony" by Joseph Green (6300)
24. **"Primordial Follies"‡ by Robert Sheckley†** (4000)
25. "Cargo Run" by William E. Cochrane (18800)
26. "Pipeline to Paradise"‡ by Nelson S. Bond† (5000)
27. "Geriatric Ward"‡ by Orson Scott Card (7000)
28. **"A Night at the Opera" by Robert Wissner** (3000)
29. "The Red Dream" by Charles Platt (9800)
30. "Living Alone in the Jungle"‡ by Algis Budrys† (1352)
31. "The Life and the Clay" by Edgar Pangborn† (6500)

==== Book Three ====
36 authors, 38 stories, 214,200 words.

1. "Mama's Girl"‡ by Daniel Keyes† (4000)
2. "Himself in Anachron"‡ by Cordwainer Smith† (2500)
3. "Dreamwork, A Novel" by Pamela Zoline (16000)
4. "The Giant Rat of Sumatra, or By the Light of the Silvery" by the Firesign Theatre (5000)
5. **"Leveled Best" by Steve Herbst** (1300)
6. "Search Cycle: Beginning and Ending" by Russell Bates†
  - "The Last Quest" (2500)
  - "Fifth and Last Horseman" (5000)
7. "XYY" by Vonda McIntyre† (1600)
8. "The Accidental Ferosslk"‡ by Frank Herbert† (3500)
9. "The Burning Zone" by Graham Charnock (6000)
10. "Cacophony in Pink and Ochre" by Doris Pitkin Buck† (5500)
11. "The Accidents of Blood" by Frank Bryning† (5500)
12. "The Murderer's Song"‡ by Michael Moorcock (7500)
13. "On the Other Side of Space, In the Lobby of the Potlatch Inn" by Wallace West† (6500)
14. "Two From Kotzwinkle's Bestiary" by William Kotzwinkle (5000)
15. "Childfinder"‡ by Octavia E. Butler† (3250)
16. "Potiphee, Petey and Me"‡ by Tom Reamy† (17000)
17. "The Seadragon" by Laurence Yep (17000)
18. "Emerging Nation" by Alfred Bester† (2000)
19. "Ugly Duckling Gets the Treatment and Becomes Cinderella Except Her Foot's Too Big for the Prince's Slipper and Is Webbed Besides" by Robert Thurston (3500)
20. **"Goodbye" by Steven Utley**† (2000)
21. "Golgotha" by Graham Hall† (3200)
22. **"War Stories" by Edward Bryant**† (10000)
23. "The Bellman"‡ by John Varley (11500)
24. "Fantasy for Six Electrodes and One Adrenaline Drip (A Play in the Form of a Feelie Script)"‡ by Joe Haldeman (10000)
25. "A Dog and His Boy"‡ by Harry Harrison† (4000)
26. "Las Animas" by Janet Nay (6800)
27. "False Premises" by George Alec Effinger†
  - "The Capitals Are Wrong" (4000)
  - "Stage Fright" (2500)
  - "Rocky Colavito Batted .268 in 1955" (5500)
  - "Fishing With Hemingway" (3000)
28. "The Senior Prom"‡ by Fred Saberhagen† (4800)
29. **"Skin" by A. E. van Vogt**† (7000)
30. "Halfway There" by Stan Dryer (3000)
31. "Love Song"‡ by Gordon R. Dickson† (6000)
32. "Suzy is Something Special" by Michael G. Coney† (8000)
33. "Previews of Hell"‡ by Jack Williamson† (3000)

=== Missing, withdrawn, or added stories ===
The following stories were not in the 1979 list but are listed in previous published contents, or known as submitted to Ellison – as Ellison kept on acquiring new stories long into the 1980s, this is the case with most of them.

- "Where Are They Now?" by Steven Bryan Bieler was sold to LDV in 1984 and withdrawn in 1988.
- **"The Great Forest Lawn Clearance Sale: Hurry Last Days!" by Stephen Dedman**, was sold to LDV in 1990.
- "Squad D" by Stephen King was submitted to LDV in the late 1970s, but reportedly not accepted in its initial draft.
- "How Dobbstown Was Saved" by Bob Leman was sold to LDV in 1981.
- "The Swastika Setup" (10,000 words) by Michael Moorcock was withdrawn and replaced by "The Murderer's Song" between the 1973 and 1979 lists (see also below); it was published in a 1972 magazine and a 1976 collection The Lives and Times of Jerry Cornelius.
- "An Infinite Summer" by Christopher Priest was commissioned, ignored and withdrawn in 1974 and published in 1976.
- "The Sibling" by Kit Reed† was originally sold to LDV and published in 2011.
- "The Isle of Sinbad" (10,000 words) by Thomas N. Scortia† was listed in the 1973 Alien Critic but not in the Locus 1979 list.
- "A Thin Silver Line" by Steve Rasnic Tem was announced as "forthcoming in The Last Dangerous Visions" in 1994.
- **“The Size of the Problem” by Howard Fast** was sold to Ellison as a replacement for Fast's "All Creatures Great And Small", as announced for the unpublished 1979 version
- The eight brief **"Intermezzos" by D.M. Rowles** were sold to Ellison as either a replacement for or a revision of Rowles's "Thumbing it on the Beam and Other Magic Melting Moments". as announced for the unpublished 1979 version
- **“Assignment No. 1” by Stephen Robinett** was accepted by Ellison sometime in the 1980s.
- **“The Final Pogrom” by Dan Simmons** was accepted by Ellison in 1982 or soon thereafter.

== Stories published elsewhere ==
As of early 2025, over forty stories purchased for Last Dangerous Visions have been published elsewhere.

- The first was "The Giant Rat of Sumatra, or By the Light of the Silvery" by the Firesign Theatre which appeared as the LP The Tale of the Giant Rat of Sumatra (1974) and in the same year in The Firesign Theatre's Big Mystery Joke Book
- "An Infinite Summer" by Christopher Priest which appeared in Andromeda 1 (1976) edited by Peter Weston. – As noted above, Priest withdrew it from TLDV four months after it was commissioned and delivered without any response, so Ellison never formally purchased it.
- "Ten Times Your Fingers and Double Your Toes" by Craig Strete (1980)
- "Primordial Follies" by Robert Sheckley (1981 in German, 1998 in Italian)
- "The Murderer's Song" by Michael Moorcock (the replacement for "The Swastika Set-Up") was first published in German translation in 1981, appeared in the 1987 anthology Tales from the Forbidden Planet and was republished several times in Moorcock's collections. (Moorcock commented in 2001 semi-jocularly: "Harlan is a good friend of mine and I have a fairly easy relationship with him on this. Every five years I take the story I originally did for him and let someone else have it. Then I write him a new story." But further iterations, if any, are unknown.)
- "Universe on the Turn" by Ian Watson was published in 1984 in Last Wave and in his 1985 collection Slow Birds.
- "Dogs' Lives" by Michael Bishop was published in the Spring 1984 issue of The Missouri Review. It was subsequently reprinted in The Best American Short Stories 1985.
- "Signals" by Charles L. Harness (1987)
- "Dark Night in Toyland" by Bob Shaw (1988)
- "What Used to be Called Dead" by Leslie A. Fiedler (1990)
- "Living Alone in the Jungle" by Algis Budrys (1991)
- "A Journey South" by John Christopher (1991)
- "Himself in Anachron" by Cordwainer Smith (died 1966) was included in the 1993 retrospective collection The Rediscovery of Man. Ellison threatened to sue the New England Science Fiction Association for publishing the story, sold to Ellison for the anthology by Smith's widow. Soon they "reached an amicable settlement" allowing the book to remain on sale; Ansible speculated "Perhaps, when he consulted the contract, HE might have found his rights to the story had long expired?"
- "Mama's Girl" by Daniel Keyes has only appeared in Japanese translation (Collected Stories, Hayakawa, 1993).
- "Pipeline to Paradise" by Nelson Bond appeared in the anthology Wheel of Fortune (1995), edited by Roger Zelazny. It was reprinted in 2002 in Bond's second Arkham House collection, The Far Side of Nowhere. Ellison publicly acknowledged soliciting the story from Bond, who at the time had retired from writing.
- "The Bones Do Lie" by Anne McCaffrey (1995)
- "The Senior Prom" by Fred Saberhagen in Prom Night (1999), an original anthology edited by Nancy Springer (and Martin H. Greenberg, uncredited)
- "Precis of the Rappacini Report" by Anthony Boucher, published as "Rappaccini's Other Daughter" in 1999.
- "The Names of Yanils" by Chan Davis (1999)
- "How Dobbstown Was Saved" by Bob Leman in his collection Feesters in the Lake and Other Stories (2002)
- "Among the Beautiful Bright Children" by James E. Gunn in his collection Human Voices (2002)
- "A Dog and His Boy" by Harry Harrison (2002)
- "The Bellman" by John Varley in Asimov's Science Fiction in 2003, and his collection The John Varley Reader in 2004
- "Previews of Hell" by Jack Williamson was included in his coffee-table retrospective Seventy-Five: The Diamond Anniversary of a Science Fiction Pioneer (2004) from Haffner Press.
- In 2005 Haffner Press published a large reprint collection of Edmond Hamilton's two "Star Kings" novels and Leigh Brackett's three stories starring her Eric Stark character, entitled Stark and the Star Kings. The title story is the long-lost tale by both writers which should have been published in Last Dangerous Visions.
- "Fantasy for Six Electrodes and One Adrenaline Drip" by Joe Haldeman (which he had believed lost until finding an old carbon copy of the manuscript) was published in his 2006 collection A Separate War and Other Stories.
- "Where Are They Now?" by Steven Bryan Bieler appeared in the Spring 2008 (Volume VII, Issue 4) online magazine Slow Trains.
- "Geriatric Ward" by Orson Scott Card was published in his 2008 collection Keeper of Dreams.
- "To Have and to Hold" by Langdon Jones appeared in audio format on Episode 146 of the podcast StarShipSofa.
- "The Sibling" by Kit Reed was published as "Baby Brother" in 2011.
- "At the Sign of the Boar's Head Nebula" by Richard Wilson was published in 2011.
- "Childfinder" by Octavia E. Butler (2014)
- "The Accidental Ferosslk" by Frank Herbert was published as "The Daddy Box" in 2014.
- "I Had No Head and My Eyes Were Floating Way Up In the Air" by Clifford D. Simak (2015)
- "Love Song" by Gordon R. Dickson was published in "The Best of Gordon R. Dickson, Volume 1" (2017).
- "The Carbon Dream" by Jack Dann appeared in 2019 as "The Carbon Dreamer" in Shivers VIII from Cemetery Dance Publications.
- "Squad D" by Stephen King, a submission to The Last Dangerous Visions which Ellison had not accepted outright, also appeared in Shivers VIII.
- "Various Kinds of Conceits" by Arthur Byron Cover was included in The Unquiet Dreamer: A Tribute to Harlan Ellison (2019) from PS Publishing.
- "A Thin Silver Line" by Steve Rasnic Tem also appeared in The Unquiet Dreamer.
- "Free Enterprise" by Jerry Pournelle was published in the 2019 Baen Books collection The Best of Jerry Pournelle under the title "The Last Shot".
- "Play Sweetly, In Harmony" by Joseph Green was published in Green's collection Otherwise Lost in 2020.
- "Not All a Dream" by Manly Wade Wellman was issued as a chapbook in 2023 to customers preordering the two volume Haffner Press The Complete John the Balladeer.
- "The Stone Which the Builders Rejected" by Avram Davidson in AD:100 Volume 1, a 2023 collection of his unpublished stories
- "Potiphee, Petey and Me" by Tom Reamy in Under the Hollywood Sign: The Collected Stories of Tom Reamy, Subterranean Press 2023
- "XYY" by Vonda McIntyre in Little Sisters and Other Stories, Goldsmiths Press 2024
- "Halfway There" by Stan Dryer was released on the author's blog

== Straczynski contents ==
Straczynski's anthology includes 31 stories (8 of them short "intermezzos") by 24 authors. Seven of the stories, marked '*' below, were selected by Straczynski; the remainder were selected by Ellison.

- "A Brief Introduction to The Last Dangerous Visions" by J. Michael Straczynski
- "Ellison Exegesis" by J. Michael Straczynski
- “Assignment No. 1” by Stephen Robinett
- “Hunger” by Max Brooks *
- “Intermezzo 1: Broken, Beautiful Body on Beach” by D. M. Rowles
- “None So Deaf” by Richard E. Peck
- “War Stories” by Edward Bryant (preceded by an introduction by Harlan Ellison)
- “Intermezzo 2: Bedtime Story” by D. M. Rowles
- “The Great Forest Lawn Clearance Sale—Hurry, Last Days!!” by Stephen Dedman
- “Intermezzo 3: Even Beyond Olympus” by D. M. Rowles
- “After Taste” by Cecil Castellucci *
- “Leveled Best” by Steve Herbst
- “The Time of the Skin” by A. E. van Vogt
- “Rundown” by John Morressy
- “Intermezzo 4: Elemental” by D. M. Rowles
- “The Weight of a Feather (The Weight of a Heart)” by Cory Doctorow *
- “The Malibu Fault” by Jonathan Fast
- “The Size of the Problem” by Howard Fast
- “Intermezzo 5: First Contact” by D. M. Rowles
- “A Night at the Opera” by Robert Wissner
- “Goodbye” by Steven Utley
- “Primordial Follies” by Robert Sheckley
- “Men in White” by David Brin *
- “Intermezzo 6: Continuity” by D. M. Rowles
- “The Final Pogrom” by Dan Simmons
- “Intermezzo 7: The Space Behind the Obvious” by D. M. Rowles
- “Falling from Grace” by Ward Moore
- “First Sight” by Adrian Tchaikovsky *
- “Intermezzo 8: Proof” by D. M. Rowles
- “Binary System” by Kayo Hartenbaum *
- “Dark Threshold” by P. C. Hodgell
- “The Danann Children Laugh” by Mildred Downey Broxon
- “Judas Iscariot Didn’t Kill Himself: A Story in Fragments” by James S. A. Corey *
- "Afterword: Tetelestai! Compiling The Last Dangerous Visions" by J. Michael Straczynski

== Reception ==
The book was met with mixed to negative reviews. Gary K. Wolfe of Locus Magazine noted: "While there are some fine stories in The Last Dangerous Visions, and some that may evoke a degree of nostalgia among older readers ... [the book] is unlikely to produce any classics like the award-nominated tales from Le Guin, Russ, Delany, Leiber, Dick, and Farmer that emerged from Ellison’s original volumes." Bill Caposerre of fantasyliterature.com gave the book a 2.5/5 "Not recommended" rating, saying: "Disappointing ... of the 32 pieces I could only name five or six I’d call good to excellent, with a pretty steep drop-off from that handful." Rob Latham of The Los Angeles Review of Books concluded: "There are a few excellent stories — to be precise, four — plus many mediocre-to-adequate ones, and a handful of genuine stinkers ... Maybe this whole tragic enterprise should have been left on the shelf where it fitfully lay for half a century, instead of being gathered into this feeble public cenotaph."

== See also ==
- Development hell
- Vaporware
