= The Separation (Priest novel) =

2002 Christopher Priest novel

- First edition
- Author: Christopher Priest
- Language: English
- Genre: Science fiction, alternate history
- Publisher: Scribners
- Publication date: 2002
- Publication place: United Kingdom
- Media type: Print (hardcover)
- ISBN: 0-7432-0836-6
- OCLC: 59521604

The Separation is a novel by British writer Christopher Priest, published in 2002. It is an alternate history revolving around the experiences of identical twin brothers during the Second World War, during which one becomes a pilot for the RAF, and the other, a conscientious objector, becomes an ambulance driver for the Red Cross. The author introduces a deliberate confusion by giving these brothers identical initials – J.L. Sawyer – one known as Jack (the pilot) and the other as Joe (the ambulance driver).

Multiple histories – at least two, and on some readings many more – are presented, with different roles and fates for the various characters. The novel abounds with plays on the uncertainty of identity not just between the twin brothers, but also that of Winston Churchill (who used look-alike stand-ins) and, crucially, Rudolf Hess, Hitler's deputy, who flew to Britain in 1941 claiming to have a peace offer from Hitler.

The novel also utilises a favourite technique of Priest's, that of the unreliable narrator.

== Publication ==
The novel was first published in the United Kingdom in 2002, in trade paperback by Scribners (ISBN 0-7432-2033-1), followed by a hardcover by Gollancz (ISBN 0-575-07002-1) in 2003. It was not published in the United States until 2005, when it was published in hardback by Old Earth Books (ISBN 1-882968-33-6). The Separation was translated into French by Michelle Charrier; it has also appeared in a Spanish translation.

=== Re-Publication ===
British magazine The Bookseller reported in May 2003, that The Separation was "to be republished by Orion after the author bought back the rights from Simon & Schuster." The report said that Priest was unhappy with the publicity and marketing support, and quoted Priest as saying, "A lot of staff I had been working with had left. The new editor was clearly not in sympathy with the book, and there was no apparent inhouse support for it." The article added that, in November 2002, Orion's managing director, Malcolm Edwards approached Priest and proposed that Gollancz republish the title in hardback. "Gollancz has always felt like a natural home to me, so I can't say how pleased I am to finally have made it after all these years," Priest said.

== Critical reception ==
In an article for New Scientist about the contestants for the 2003 Arthur C. Clarke Award, Maggie McDonald praised the novel as "strong competition... The twins—RAF pilot and conscientious objector—reach cusps of change, war triumphs, peace fails or vice versa. Priest's writing is gripping, and it's one of those rare books that reveal what writing is: manner and matter twinned and entwined."

Elizabeth Hand described the book as "exquisite ... an exceptionally frightening novel whose nightmare power derives from its chilling, almost clinical evocation of an historical reality with which we are all familiar, the London Blitz... a cliffhanger narrative of dual identities, betrayals, and shifting realities, as two versions of the twins' histories—and England's, and the world's—are woven together, like strands of DNA, to form a terrifying narrative. Priest has used doubles before to great effect, in his award-winning novel The Prestige; but The Separation trumps even that tale. Its chapters linger in the mind like scenes from a Hitchcock film, impossible to shake off; like Hitchcock's work, The Separation begs for repeated readings to appreciate the cold brilliance and execution of its intricate plot fully. A masterly novel that deserves to become a classic."

Publishers Weekly called it a "subtle, unsettling alternative WWII history": "Convincingly detailed diaries, scraps of published texts, declassified transcripts and more baffle a historian who tries to reconcile different realities. The brothers themselves recognize the uncertainty of motives and actions; Joe in particular struggles to believe that he's making a better future even though he realizes how much it costs him personally. Many alternative history novels are bloodless extrapolations from mountains of data, but this one quietly builds characters you care about—then leaves their dilemmas unresolved as they try to believe that what they have done is 'right'."

Pauline Morgan, reviewing the novel for SF Crowsnest.com, said, "This is a glorious book to read—not for nothing was Christopher Priest included in the line-up of Britain's best young novelists some years ago. The Separation does what so few books do these days, whatever genre they are written in; it encourages the reader to think."

== Awards ==
The Separation won the 2002 BSFA Award and the 2003 Arthur C. Clarke Award. It was a finalist for the 2002 Sidewise Award for best long-form alternate history, and the 2003 John W. Campbell Memorial Award. The French translation won the 2006 Grand Prix de l'Imaginaire for best novel in translation.
