= The Glamour (novel) =

1984 novel by Christopher Priest

- Author: Christopher Priest
- Genre: Fantasy
- Publisher: Cape
- Publication date: 1984

The Glamour is a novel by Christopher Priest published in 1984.

== Plot summary ==
The Glamour is a novel in which a cameraman becomes an amnesiac. He and several other characters turn out to have "the Glamour," i.e. the power of invisibility.

== Reception ==
Dave Langford reviewed The Glamour for White Dwarf #60, and stated that "The Glamour should be read rather than described in all its strange detail; hypnotic, tricky, uneasy and full of double meaning, it demands to be reread the moment you've finished. Excellent."

== Reviews ==
- Review by Faren Miller (1985) in Locus, #288 January 1985
- Review by Paul Kincaid (1985) in Vector 124/125
- Review by Richard Mathews (1985) in Fantasy Review, June 1985
- Review by Algis Budrys (1985) in The Magazine of Fantasy & Science Fiction, October 1985
- Review by D. W. 'Doc' Kennedy (1985) in Rod Serling's The Twilight Zone Magazine, October 1985
- Review by Don D'Ammassa (1985) in Science Fiction Chronicle, #73 October 1985
- Review by Judith Hanna (1985) in Interzone, #11 Spring 1985
- Review by David Pringle (1988) in Modern Fantasy: The Hundred Best Novels
