= Stephen Robinett =

American novelist

Stephen Allen Robinett
- Born: July 13, 1941; Long Beach, California
- Died: February 16, 2004 (aged 62); Corona del Mar, Newport Beach, California
- Occupations: Novelist; journalist; lawyer
- Writing career
- Pen name: Steve Hahn, Tak Hallus
- Genres: Science fiction mystery

Stephen Allen Robinett (13 July 1941 – 16 February 2004) was an American writer of science-fiction and mystery novels and short stories.

== Life and career ==
Robinett's first publication appeared in the March 1969 edition of the magazine Analog Science Fiction and Fact, the novelette "Minitalent", which was published with his most-used pseudonym, Tak Hallus (derived from the Persian takhallus). By the mid-1970s, however, he had begun using his own name. He published two novels, Stargate and The Man Responsible during the mid-1970s, and continued to publish novels and short fiction until the early 1990s.

He also wrote extensively in the area of business journalism and was a lawyer licensed in California.

He died on 16 February 2004 from complications caused by Hodgkins disease.

In 2024, his short story Assignment No. 1 was published posthumously in the sci-fi anthology book The Last Dangerous Visions, itself a posthumous publication edited on-and-off by the late Harlan Ellison between 1972 and 2014, when two strokes prevented him from editing until his death in 2018.

== Bibliography ==
=== Novels ===
- Mindwipe! (1976) (as Steve Hahn)
- Stargate (1976)
- The Man Responsible (1978)
- Final Option (Mystery, 1990)
- Unfinished Business (Mystery, 1990)

=== Collections ===
- Projections (1979)

=== Short Fiction ===
- "Minitalent" (1969) (as Tak Hallus)
- "Mindwipe" (1969) (as Tak Hallus)
- "Homage" (1971) (as Tak Hallus)
- "Mr. Winthrop Projects" (1971) (as Tak Hallus)
- "Jenson's Folly" (1973) (also appeared as "Force Over Distance" (as Tak Hallus))
- "Cynthia" (1973) (also as Tak Hallus)
- "Laws and Orders" (1974) (as Tak Hallus)
- "Pow Wow "(1975) (also as Tak Hallus)
- "The Linguist" (1975) (as Tak Hallus)
- "The Tax Man" (1975)
- "Helbent 4" (1975)
- "A Penny's Worth" (1976)
- "Projections" (1976)
- "The Man Responsible" (1977)
- "Tomus" (1977)
- "Guzman's Gardener" (1978)
- "The Satyr" (1978)
- "Hell Creatures of the Third Planet" (1979)
- "The President's Image" (1980)
- "Number 13" (1982)
- "Amor y Pesetas" (intended for The Last Dangerous Visions, published instead in Omni, Nov. 1983)
- "Aki magasra tör...?" (2023, in Hungarian)
- "Assignment No. 1" (published in The Last Dangerous Visions, 2024)
- "Iron Hill" (unpublished; possibly an alternate title for "Amor y Pesetas" - intended for The Last Dangerous Visions)
