= The Prestige (novel) =

1995 novel by Christopher Priest

- First edition
- Author: Christopher Priest
- Audio read by: Peter Kenny
- Language: English
- Genre: Science fiction, Horror fiction
- Publisher: Touchstone, Simon & Schuster
- Publication date: 1995
- Publication place: United Kingdom
- Media type: Print
- Pages: 404
- ISBN: 0-671-71924-6
- LC Class: PR6066.R55 P74

The Prestige is a 1995 science fiction novel by Christopher Priest. It tells the story of a prolonged feud between two stage magicians in late 1800s England. Its main structure is that of a collection of diaries that were kept by the protagonists and later collated. The title derives from the novel's fictional practice of stage illusions having three parts: the setup, the performance, and the prestige (effect).

The novel received the James Tait Black Memorial Prize for best fiction and the World Fantasy Award for Best Novel.

It has been adapted for a movie by the same name by director Christopher Nolan in 2006.

== Plot ==
Past events are told through the diaries of nineteenth-century magicians Rupert Angier and Alfred Borden. The diaries are read by their great-grandchildren, Kate Angier and Andrew Westley (born Nicholas Borden), who meet in the present day. Throughout the novel, the two diary accounts are interspersed with events of Kate's and Andrew's framing story. Andrew's story is related to his childhood as an adoptee and his current job as a journalist. Kate's story is related to a traumatic event that happened when she was five years old, in which she witnessed her father murder a small boy. This leads her to search for Andrew, whom she believes is the twin of the murdered boy. As the diaries are read, the truth of what happened to Andrew's twin is explained by the history of Angier and Borden.

The central plot focuses on a feud between the magicians, begun in the fledgling years of their careers when Borden disrupts a fake seance being conducted by Angier and his pregnant wife Julia after they had conducted a previous one for one of Borden's relatives. Borden was upset that they had presented it as real when he realized it was an illusion. During the scuffle, Julia is thrown to the ground, resulting in a miscarriage. The two men are mutually antagonistic for many years afterwards as they rise to become world-renowned stage magicians, with the feud affecting the later generations of their families to come, including Kate and Andrew.

Borden develops a teleportation act called "The Transported Man", and later creates an improved version named "The New Transported Man", which appears to move him from one closed cabinet to another in the blink of an eye without appearing to pass through the intervening space. The act seems to defy physics and puts all previous magic acts to shame. The reader learns that Alfred Borden is actually not one man but two: identical twins named Albert and Frederick who share the identity of "Alfred Borden" secretly to ensure their professional success with "The New Transported Man". Angier suspects that Borden uses a double, but dismisses the idea because he thinks it is too easy.

In the meantime, Angier had developed his own act and left his wife for his stage assistant, Olivia. Desperate to discover how Borden's trick is performed, Angier sends Olivia to spy on Borden. However, Olivia begins to fall in love with Borden, and they conspire to send Angier on a wild goose chase thinking that the act relies on technology from the acclaimed inventor Nikola Tesla. After being contacted by Angier, Tesla eventually constructs a machine which Angier uses to develop an act called "In a Flash". Tesla's device teleports a human being from one place to another by creating an exact physical duplicate at a specified destination into which the person's consciousness is instantly transmitted while the original body is left behind, lifeless. Because of this method, Angier is forced to devise a way to conceal the original bodies whenever the trick is performed. He clinically refers to these near-lifeless shells in his diary as "the prestige materials".

Angier's new act is as successful as Borden's. The infuriated and obsessed Borden attempts to discover how "In a Flash" is performed. During one performance he breaks into the backstage area and turns off the power to Angier's device, mistakenly believing the generator powering it is about to catch fire and light the theatre ablaze. The subsequent teleportation is incomplete and both the duplicated Angier and the "prestige" Angier survive as separate persons after this incident, though the duplicate seems to lack physical substance while the original feels increasingly weak physically. The original "prestige" Angier fakes his own death as part of a previous plan to put behind his public persona of a magician, and returns as the heir to his family estate of Caldlow House without any publicity. While there, he becomes terminally ill.

Angier had discovered Borden's secret as a twin prior to the accident that created his duplicate. Angier's duplicate, feeling alienated from the world by his ghostly form and consumed with thoughts of revenge, attacks one of the Borden twins before a performance. However, Borden's apparent poor health, age, and the duplicate Angier's resurgent sense of morality cause him to stop short of murdering the twin. It is implied that this particular Borden twin dies a few days later, and the incorporeal Angier travels to meet the original "prestige" Angier, now living as the 14th Earl of Colderdale. They come into possession of Borden's diary, courtesy of a disgruntled third party in need of money, but publish it without revealing the twins' secret. Shortly afterwards, the corporeal Angier dies and his ghostly duplicate uses Tesla's device one last time to teleport himself into the body, hoping that he will either reanimate it and become whole again or kill himself instantly and so reunite with his other self in death.

In the final section of the novel, Kate and Andrew's mystery is revealed. Andrew Westley goes into the Angier family vault and finds all of Rupert Angier's near-lifeless shells (prestige materials) labelled with the date and place they were created. Andrew also finds a prestige of a small boy labeled Nicholas Julius Borden, with his place of creation listed as Caldlow House. It is then understood that Andrew himself never had a twin. When Kate and Andrew were children, their families had met in an attempt to mend the rift between them. However, during an argument, Kate's father had cast the young Nicholas Borden into the Tesla device, rendering the "prestige" Nicholas Borden lifeless on the ground and creating the duplicate who later became Andrew Westley. It is also revealed to Kate Angier and Andrew Westley that Angier's attempt to become whole again was successful, and some form of Rupert Angier had continued to survive in the Caldlow House to the present day.

== Critical reception ==
David Langford wrote in a 1996 review, "It seems entirely logical that Christopher Priest's latest novel should centre on stage magic and magicians. The particular brand of misdirection that lies at the heart of theatrical conjuring is also a favourite Priest literary ploy – the art of not so much fooling the audience as encouraging them to fool themselves... The final section is strange indeed, more Gothic than science fiction in flavour, heavy with metaphorical power. There are revelations, and more is implied about the peculiar nature of the Angier/Tesla effect's payoff or 'prestige' – a term used in this sense by both magicians. The trick is done; before and after, Priest has rolled up both sleeves; his hands are empty and he fixes you with an honest look. And yet ... you realise that it is necessary to read The Prestige again. It's an extraordinary performance, his best book in years, perhaps his best ever. Highly recommended."

Publishers Weekly said, "This is a complex tale that must have been extremely difficult to tell in exactly the right sequence, while still maintaining a series of shocks to the very end. Priest has brought it off with great imagination and skill. It's only fair to say, though, that the book's very considerable narrative grip is its principal virtue. The characters and incidents have a decidedly Gothic cast, and only the restraint that marks the story's telling keeps it on the rails."

Elizabeth Hand wrote, "There is a certain amount of grim humor to The Prestige, the blatant Can-You-Top-This? careerism of dueling prestidigitators whose feud is carried out against the lush backdrop of fin-de-siècle London. And the novel provides the pleasures of a mystery as well, as the reader attempts to find the man (or men) behind the curtain, and discover the true parentage of Andrew Westley, who may or may not be related to Borden. But at its core The Prestige is a horror novel, and a particularly terrifying one because its secret is revealed so slowly, and in such splendid language... The Prestige is both disturbing and exhilarating – one closes the book shaken, wondering how it was done; and eager to see what the master illusionist will produce for his next trick."

Adam Kirkman called the novel "vastly underrated... Priest weaves together a tale of two feuding stage magicians at the turn of the century, a dark but mesmerising story that sees two men become consumed with, and eventually destroyed by, obsession. While the film hammers you over the head with clues about the final twist, so much so that you feel embarrassed when re-watching it, Priest's novel is more subtle, although a smart reader is in on the trick from the start. The real beauty of this novel is the characters, who are fleshed out more fully here than on screen, and the magical elements of the story achieve a fantastical, creepy edge. If you enjoyed the film, then Priest's novel is grander in scope and more chilling in nature, and is a gem that should not be ignored."

The Guardian review said, "Behind all the surface trickery lies an intelligent and thoughtful novel about the nature of illusion and secrecy, and about the damage done to those who appoint themselves keepers of such dangerous secrets."

A review in Kliatt of the audiobook version narrated by Simon Vance described it as "a spellbinding and entirely original neo-gothic thriller that moves the listener adroitly from the world of staged illusion to the otherworldly, from the historical...to the horror-laden, with all sorts of strange and dazzling stops along the way. The plot is convoluted and occasionally technical, spanning generations and incorporating multiple narrators and a large cast of characters. A lesser audiobook narrator might inadvertently muddle the story, but, as usual, Vance displays a dramatic and vocal range that is more than equal to his task. He enhances Priest's novel with superb pacing and a host of highly convincing voices and accents."

== Awards and nominations ==
- British Fantasy Award nominee, 1995
- James Tait Black Memorial Prize winner, 1996
- Bram Stoker Award nominee, 1996
- World Fantasy Award winner, 1996
- Arthur C. Clarke Award nominee, 1996

== Film adaptation ==
A motion picture adaptation, which had been optioned by Newmarket Films and which was directed by Christopher Nolan, was released on 20 October 2006 in the United States. It stars Christian Bale and Hugh Jackman as Borden and Angier, respectively, as well as Michael Caine, Scarlett Johansson and David Bowie. The novel was adapted by Christopher and Jonathan Nolan.

== See also ==
- Look-alike
