= Window (short story) =

1980 short story by Bob Leman

"Window" is a science fiction story by American writer Bob Leman, originally published in the May 1980 issue of The Magazine of Fantasy and Science Fiction, and reprinted numerous times.

== Plot summary ==
A researcher seeking to merge science and magic opens a “window” to another dimension, which reveals what seems to be a tranquil Victorian home and family. The viewpoint characters can see through the "window" to the family, but the family can't see them. Yearning for the apparently idyllic 19th century life seen through the portal, a subordinate leaps into the other dimension but is immediately killed and eaten by the family, who turn out to be alien inhuman predators. The family performs a ritual, closing the portal, and the window disappears. However, the dead man's bones come out of thin air where the portal had been. The viewpoint characters realize that the man-eating family have found a "window" into their world and are now watching them.

== Reception ==
"Window" was nominated for the Nebula Award for Best Short Story. The influential science fiction publisher Donald A. Wollheim included the short story in The 1981 Annual World's Best SF. Ann and Jeff VanderMeer included it in the 2012 compendium The Weird.

The story was adapted in the episode "A View Through the Window" in the anthology horror series Night Visions, starring Bill Pullman in the main role.
