= Short Circuit (Wedgelock novel) =

Short Circuit is a novel by Colin Wedgelock published in 1986.

== Plot summary ==
Short Circuit is a novel in which a robot becomes alive after being struck by lightning, as a novelization of the film Short Circuit.

== Reception ==
Dave Langford reviewed Short Circuit for White Dwarf #87, and stated that "I haven't seen the film, but the novelization is taut and funny: ultimate weapons which fancy themselves at disco dancing are OK by me."

== Reviews ==
- Review by Helen McNabb (1987) in Paperback Inferno, #65
