= The Extremes =

1998 novel by Christopher Priest

- First edition
- Author: Christopher Priest
- Cover artist: Holly Warburton
- Language: English
- Genre: Science fiction
- Publisher: Simon & Schuster
- Publication date: 1998
- Publication place: United Kingdom
- Media type: Print (hardback & paperback)
- Pages: 393 pp
- ISBN: 0-684-81632-6
- OCLC: 41267264

The Extremes is a 1998 science fiction novel by the English writer Christopher Priest. The novel received the BSFA Award.

== Plot introduction ==
Teresa Simons is drawn to a quiet English seaside town in the aftermath of an apparently motiveless massacre by a gunman. Her husband, Andy Simons, who was an FBI agent like Teresa, had died in a similar outburst of violence in a small Texas town, on the exact same day. Similarities between the two incidents of spree violence (a term often used in the novel), apparently taking place at random, are shocking and inexplicable. Teresa finds she can come to terms with the senseless nature of the murders only by immersing herself in the world of virtual reality—to be precise, the American-built technology that allows her to enter into the frightening world of the Extremes simulations.

== Critical reception ==
Publishers Weekly described the novel as a "forensic thriller with a strong science fictional element": "Priest (The Prestige) keeps one eye on his suspenseful plot, another on the SF angles that underpin it and a third, camera-eye on the real implications of worldwide instant communication, virtual reality and media-driven violence. If his lingo can get a bit thick ("It's the same thing, in algorithmic terms, as your basic what-the-hell symbolic adumbration"), his plot will keep most readers raptly amazed."

Booklist wrote, "This enthralling fantasy seems tailor-made for film, filled as it is with images blurring time and space."

Rich Horton, at SF Site, said, "The scenes in ExEx are well done, believable and scary, and comment on our fascination with violence – and to some extent on our complicity with it – subtly, without lecturing. The writing is excellent... Priest seems fascinated with reality and how our consciousness creates our reality, and as such could hardly be expected to resist the temptation presented by a subject such as extremely realistic VR simulations. His speculations here jump off the extrapolation track a bit, in my opinion, but they are fascinating, and the ending of this novel takes on a certain logic of its own. It's moving and interesting, and well constructed... I was left feeling a bit like I'd read two books: one about what a cover blurb calls "the pornography of violence" and how people react and adapt to it; and another about consensus reality, and how VR might expand or alter that reality. Both subjects are interesting, and I still found this an absorbing novel, one of the best of 1998."

== Awards and nominations ==
The Extremes won the BSFA Award in 1998 for Best SF Novel, and was nominated for the 1999 Arthur C. Clarke Award. In the 2000 Locus Poll Award it ranked No. 23 Best SF Novel.
