= Fugue for a Darkening Island =

1972 novel by Christopher Priest

- First edition
- Author: Christopher Priest
- Cover artist: Judith Ann Lawrence
- Language: English
- Genre: Dystopian
- Publisher: Faber and Faber
- Publication date: 1972
- Publication place: United Kingdom
- Media type: Print
- Pages: 147
- ISBN: 0-571-09794-4

Fugue for a Darkening Island (published in the US as Darkening Island) is a dystopian novel by Christopher Priest. First published in 1972, it describes a man's struggle to protect his family and himself in a near-future England ravaged by civil war. The violence is brought about by a new far-right political party entering government, voted in to combat a massive influx of African refugees. Those refugees are aligned with the principal opposition faction, known as the Secessionists, leading to a multi-sided conflict.

== Plot summary ==
The novel is a first-person narrative that shifts back and forth between time periods. Alan Whitman is a college lecturer who lives in London with his wife Isobel and daughter Sally. By the time Sally was two years old, Alan and Isobel could barely tolerate each other. Alan has a series of affairs but decides to stay with Isobel for the sake of Sally.

A nuclear war erupts in Africa, killing millions. Millions more flee the continent. A right-wing government led by John Tregarth is elected in the United Kingdom on an anti-immigration platform. Within a year, however, over two million African refugees, known as "Afrims", have entered the country by boat.

In response to the government's restrictions on refugees, some migrants and white residents form armed militias and begin fighting over neighbourhoods. About 25% of the army, airforce and police mutiny, forming a secessionist force opposed to the government. A civil war develops between the government's Nationalist Army, the opposition Secessionist Army and the Afrim militias.

The government closes Alan's college, and he can only find work in a clothing factory. When he learns the government is about to bring in conscription, he tries to enlist as an officer in the Nationalist Army, but he is rejected when he reveals his previous membership of a refugee support group.

When fighting erupts in the next street, Alan decides to drive his family to Bristol where Isobel's parents live. Their car breaks down in the countryside, and they attempt to reach Bristol on foot. While crossing a river, Isobel almost drowns and most of their food and camping equipment gets soaked. Alan and Isobel argue over whether they should return to London, try to reach Bristol, or go to a refugee camp. Alan tells her that their marriage is over and she should go to Bristol alone while he and Sally return to London. That night, Isobel secretly leaves.

After a failed attempt to reach London by train, Alan and Sally find temporary shelter, narrowly escaping fighting between opposing forces. While sheltering in an abandoned house, Alan sees Isobel in a group of refugees led by a man named Lateef (Rafiq in the revised edition). He and Sally join the group.

The group camps in an old church for the winter, but when the Nationalists launch a spring offensive in the area, some group members with children move to a United Nations refugee camp. The Whitmans, however, go with the majority into Afrim-controlled territory. One night, Afrim militiamen kidnap the group's women, including Isobel and Sally.

Lateef takes his group to a makeshift brothel to improve morale. Alan steals a rifle there, becoming the only group member with a firearm. Facing starvation, the group enters an abandoned village where they find the bodies of four white women who have been raped and murdered. Lateef suggests they burn the house down rather than bury the bodies. When an Afrim helicopter gunship approaches to investigate the fire, Alan shoots it down. They investigate the wreckage and find an African trapped inside. Alan cannot bring himself to shoot the badly injured survivor.

The group finds crates of rifles and ammunition in a bombed-out Nationalist convoy, and votes to form an armed guerrilla unit. Alan abandons his rifle and sneaks away, heading south.

He runs into another refugee group whose leader tells him that Isobel and Sally have probably been taken to an Afrim brothel located on the south coast. Alan walks to Worthing and is shot at from a barricade. He dives for cover and twists his ankle. After questioning by the civilian guards, he is allowed to enter the town, and an elderly white couple give him shelter until he recovers.

After four days, Alan walks east through war-ravaged suburbs, occasionally encountering Afrim soldiers. He reaches the beach where he meets a youth who directs him to the Afrim brothel, telling him the Afrims kill the women there who make trouble. Alan walks towards the brothel and finds the naked bodies of Isobel and Sally among a pile of corpses left on the beach. The next day he kills an African and takes his rifle.

== Background ==
Christopher Priest wrote the novel in 1971 to see whether it was still possible to produce a literary work in the British tradition of the "catastrophe novel". The refugee crisis and civil war of the novel were inspired by the Troubles in Northern Ireland, the expulsion of Southern Asians by the governments of Uganda and Kenya, and by Enoch Powell's "rivers of blood" speech in 1968.

== Publication history ==
The novel was first published in the United Kingdom by Faber and Faber in 1972. It was published in the United States the same year as Darkening Island. A revised edition of the novel was published by Gollancz in 2011 under the original title. Priest states that he changed the vocabulary used to describe the subject matter, used a more emotionally engaged tone and "removed anything that I think could lead to overt political interpretation" because he "didn't like being lined up with racists".

== Reception ==
Fugue for a Darkening Island was well received both upon release and in later years, coming third in the 1973 John W. Campbell Memorial Award for Best Science Fiction Novel, while a 2011 review in Starburst magazine stated that it is "positively prescient in its foretelling." Academic Andrew M. Butler writes that the neutral moral tone of the novel raises the question of whether the book or the characters are racist. Critic Paul Kincaid writes that this is a misreading, as the novel portrays violence on all sides and lays the blame for the escalating violence on the extremist policies of the Tregarth government.
