= The Islanders (Priest novel) =

2011 novel by Christopher Priest

- First edition
- Author: Christopher Priest
- Cover artist: Grady McFerrin
- Language: English
- Series: Dream Archipelago
- Genre: Science fiction
- Publisher: Gollancz
- Publication date: 2011
- Publication place: United Kingdom
- Media type: Print (Hardcover and Paperback)
- Pages: 339pp
- ISBN: 0-575-07004-8

The Islanders is a 2011 science fiction novel by British writer Christopher Priest.

== Plot ==
The Islanders is nominally a guidebook to the Dream Archipelago, a fictional island group that had also served as the setting of Priest's 1981 novel The Affirmation and 1999 short story collection The Dream Archipelago. Each chapter is dedicated to a particular island: some have been sculpted into vast musical instruments, others are home to lethal creatures, others the playground for high society. The novel makes heavy use of the literary device of the unreliable narrator; specific details of the background shift and alter as the overall story unfolds.

== Reception ==
Publishers Weekly wrote: "British novelist Priest (The Prestige) creates a mind-bending, head-scratching book (already much lauded in the U.K.) that pretends to be a gazetteer of the Dream Archipelago, uncountable islands spread around a world whose temporal and spatial anomalies make such a project futile. The dispassionate descriptions of separate islands include odd references out of which it's possible to begin assembling a cast of characters: maniac artists, social reformers, murderers, scientific researchers, and passionate lovers. Some of these categories overlap, and all the actors are maddeningly fragmented, apt to fade away or flash intensely to life. Interpolated bits of directly personal narratives sometimes clarify and sometimes muddy the story (or stories), while uncanny events struggle to escape the gazetteers' avowedly objective control and Priest's elegant, cool prose. The result is wonderfully fascinating, if occasionally frustrating, and entirely unforgettable."

In The Guardian, Ursula K. LeGuin wrote "The trip Christopher Priest takes us on in The Islanders is not such an easy-going one. Descriptions of the islands are often of the prevailing climate, currents, winds and other technical information. ... Still, piecing together the rather unpleasant lives of the main characters is entertaining; and there are episodes complete in themselves, short stories really, which are satisfying."

== Awards ==
The Islanders won the 2011 BSFA Award for Best Novel and in 2012 came joint first (with Joan Slonczewski) in the John W. Campbell Memorial Award for Best Science Fiction Novel.
