= The Best Science Fiction of the Year 7 =

1978 anthology edited by Terry Carr

The Best Science Fiction of the Year #7
- Cover of first edition, 1978
- Editor: Terry Carr
- Language: English
- Series: The Best Science Fiction of the Year
- Genre: Science fiction
- Publisher: Del Rey Books
- Publication date: 1978
- Publication place: United States
- Media type: Print (paperback)
- Pages: 365
- ISBN: 0-345-27338-9
- Preceded by: The Best Science Fiction of the Year 6
- Followed by: The Best Science Fiction of the Year 8

The Best Science Fiction of the Year #7 is an anthology of science fiction short stories edited by Terry Carr, the seventh volume in a series of sixteen. It was first published in paperback by Del Rey Books in July 1978, and in hardcover under the slightly variant title Best Science Fiction of the Year 7 by Gollancz in November 1978.

The book collects nine novellas, novelettes and short stories by various science fiction authors, with an introduction, notes and concluding essays by Carr and Charles N. Brown. The stories were previously published in 1977 in the magazines Analog Science Fiction/Science Fact, Cosmos Science Fiction and Fantasy, and The Magazine of Fantasy & Science Fiction, and the anthologies Orbit 19, 2076: The American Tricentennial, New Voices in Science Fiction, and Universe 7.

== Contents ==
- "Introduction" (Terry Carr)
- "Lollipop and the Tar Baby" (John Varley)
- "Stardance" (Spider Robinson and Jeanne Robinson)
- "The House of Compassionate Sharers" (Michael Bishop)
- "The Screwfly Solution" (Raccoona Sheldon)
- "Aztecs" (Vonda N. McIntyre)
- "Tropic of Eden" (Lee Killough)
- "Victor" (Bruce McAllister)
- "The Family Monkey" (Lisa Tuttle)
- "A Rite of Spring" (Fritz Leiber)
- "Recommended Reading - 1977" (Terry Carr)
- "The Science Fiction Year" (Charles N. Brown)

== Awards ==
The anthology placed first in the 1979 Locus Award for Best Anthology.

"Stardance" won the 1977 Nebula Award for Best Novella and the 1978 Hugo Award for Best Novella, and placed first in the 1978 Locus Poll Award for Best Novella.

"The House of Compassionate Sharers" was nominated for the 1978 Ditmar Award for Best International Long Fiction and placed twelfth in the 1978 Locus Poll Award for Best Short Fiction.

"Aztecs" was nominated for the 1977 Nebula Award for Best Novella and the 1978 Hugo Award for Best Novella, and placed third in the 1978 Locus Poll Award for Best Novella.

"The Family Monkey" placed seventh in the 1978 Locus Poll Award for Best Novella.

"A Rite of Spring" was nominated for the 1977 Nebula Award for Best Novelette and placed fourth in the 1978 Locus Poll Award for Best Short Fiction.
