= The Prestige =

2006 film by Christopher Nolan

- Theatrical release poster
- Directed by: Christopher Nolan
- Screenplay by: Jonathan Nolan; Christopher Nolan
- Based on: The Prestige by Christopher Priest
- Produced by: Emma Thomas; Aaron Ryder; Christopher Nolan
- Starring: Hugh Jackman; Christian Bale; Michael Caine; Scarlett Johansson; Rebecca Hall; Andy Serkis; David Bowie
- Cinematography: Wally Pfister
- Edited by: Lee Smith
- Music by: David Julyan
- Production companies: Newmarket Films; Syncopy
- Distributed by: Buena Vista Pictures Distribution (United States and Canada) (Note: Distributed by Buena Vista Pictures Distribution in the United States and Canada through the Touchstone Pictures banner.); Warner Bros. Pictures (International)
- Release dates: October 17, 2006 (El Capitan Theatre); October 20, 2006 (United States); November 10, 2006 (United Kingdom)
- Running time: 130 minutes
- Countries: United Kingdom; United States
- Language: English
- Budget: $40 million
- Box office: $109 million

The Prestige is a 2006 thriller film directed by Christopher Nolan, who co-wrote the screenplay with his brother Jonathan Nolan, based on the 1995 novel by Christopher Priest. Set in Victorian London, the film stars Hugh Jackman and Christian Bale as stage magicians who compete to create a superior teleportation illusion.

The supporting cast includes Michael Caine, Scarlett Johansson, Rebecca Hall, Andy Serkis, and David Bowie as inventor Nikola Tesla. The film reunited Nolan with Bale and Caine following Batman Begins (2005) and with several regular collaborators, including cinematographer Wally Pfister, production designer Nathan Crowley, editor Lee Smith, and composer David Julyan. Principal photography took place in early 2006, with locations including Los Angeles and Colorado.

The Prestige premiered at the El Capitan Theatre on October 17, 2006, and was released in the United States on October 20, 2006, by Buena Vista Pictures Distribution through its Touchstone Pictures label, with Warner Bros. Pictures handling international distribution. The film received generally positive reviews from critics, with particular praise for its performances, production design, and narrative structure. It was a box office success, earning $109 million worldwide on the budget of $40 million.

== Plot ==
Note: Though the movie contains multiple flash-forwards and flash-backs throughout, the story is told here in chronological order.

In 1890s London, Robert Angier, Alfred Borden, and Angier's wife, Julia, work as magician's assistants under the mentorship of John Cutter. During a water tank trick, Julia drowns after Borden, seemingly, incorrectly ties her wrists. Angier blames Borden, and the two men become bitter rivals.

Both men pursue separate careers in magic. Borden, a gifted inventor of illusions, marries a woman named Sarah, with whom he has a daughter named Jess, and hires an enigmatic assistant, Fallon. Angier, whose strength lies more in showmanship, continues working with Cutter and takes on a new assistant, Olivia. The feud escalates as Angier and Borden visit and sabotage each other's acts. Borden loses two fingers after being shot by Angier during a pistol trick, and Borden violently thwarts Angier's bird act in front of a live audience, harming an attendee.

Borden next debuts a spectacular illusion, The Transported Man, in which he appears to teleport from one side of the stage to the other almost instantly. Angier becomes obsessed with discovering the trick's secret and, with Cutter's help, roughly recreates the act using a lookalike named Root, a failed actor. Though Angier's version is successful, he resents remaining hidden beneath the stage while Root takes the applause. Desperate to outdo Borden, he sends Olivia to spy on him. Olivia, however, falls in love with Borden and defects, though she still passes Borden's coded diary to Angier.

After Angier kidnaps Fallon, Borden reveals to Angier that the key word, TESLA, supposedly decrypts the diary and reveals his method. Seeking answers, Angier travels to Colorado Springs to meet the inventor Nikola Tesla. Believing Tesla built a teleportation device for Borden, Angier commissions Tesla to make one. Tesla eventually delivers a working machine but warns that it will bring only misery. When used, the device creates a duplicate of its subject while leaving the original person intact. In London, Angier uses the machine in a new illusion, The Real Transported Man, which earns him acclaim. Sarah, suspicious of Borden's secrecy and affair with Olivia, hangs herself.

Determined to uncover Angier's method, Borden sneaks backstage during a performance of The Real Transported Man and witnesses Angier fall into a water tank and drown. He attempts to open the tank and save Angier, but is arrested for Angier's murder, convicted, and sentenced to death. While awaiting execution, Borden is approached by a solicitor for a wealthy Lord Caldlow, who offers to care for Borden's daughter Jess in exchange for the secret behind the original Transported Man. When Caldlow visits the prison, Borden is horrified to discover that he is actually Angier. Borden passes Angier a note revealing the secret, but Angier tears it up, leaving him to hang. Cutter helps dispose of Tesla's teleportation machine, but is dismayed by Angier's intention of allowing Borden to die.

As Borden is hanged, a disguised visitor shoots Angier in the basement of his theater, revealing himself as Borden. The mortally wounded Angier learns the truth: "Borden" is in fact a pair of identical twins sharing one identity. One twin loved Sarah, the other Olivia; one lost two fingers, and amputated the twin's same two fingers to match; one has survived, while the other was executed. Together, they performed The Transported Man by switching places undetected, and whenever one twin was performing, the other hid using prosthetics and makeup under the identity "Fallon".

Dying, Angier confesses that each time he used Tesla's machine, it created a clone, one of whom drowned beneath the stage each night, and that he is no longer sure of his own identity. The surviving Borden brother reclaims his daughter, as Cutter narrates that the final act of any magic trick—the "prestige"—is the return of what was thought lost. Angier's death knocks over a kerosene lamp that sends his theater up in flames, revealing rows of water tanks holding the corpses of his many duplicates.

== Cast ==
- Hugh Jackman as Lord Caldlow, an aristocratic English magician, whose public persona is the American magician Robert "The Great Danton" Angier. Nolan cast Jackman, stating that Angier "has a wonderful understanding of the interaction between a performer and a live audience", a quality he believed Jackman possessed. Jackman based his portrayal of Angier on 1950s-era magician Channing Pollock. Jackman also portrays Gerald Root, an alcoholic lookalike used for Angier's New Transported Man.
- Christian Bale as Alfred "The Professor" Borden / Frederick Borden / Bernard Fallon, a working-class English magician. While Nolan had previously cast Bale as Batman in Batman Begins (2005), he did not consider Bale for the role of Borden until Bale contacted him about the script. Nolan subsequently believed that Bale was "exactly right" for the part and that it was "unthinkable" for anyone else to play it. Nolan suggested that the actors not read the original novel, but Bale ignored the advice.
- Michael Caine as John Cutter, the stage engineer (ingénieur) who works with Angier and Borden. Caine had previously collaborated with Nolan and Bale in Batman Begins. Nolan noted that the part had been written "before I'd ever met" Caine. Caine described Cutter as "a teacher, a father, and a guide to Angier". In trying to create the character's nuanced portrait, Caine altered his voice and posture.
- Scarlett Johansson as Olivia Wenscombe, Angier and Borden's assistant. Nolan was "very keen" for Johansson to play the role, and when he met with her to discuss it, "she just loved the character".
- Piper Perabo as Julia McCullough, Milton the Magician's assistant and Angier's wife.
- Rebecca Hall as Sarah Borden, Borden's wife. Hall had to relocate from North London to Los Angeles in order to shoot the film, although the film itself takes place in London.
- David Bowie as Nikola Tesla, the real-life inventor who creates a teleportation device for Angier. For Tesla, Nolan wanted someone who was not necessarily a film star but was "extraordinarily charismatic". Nolan stated that Bowie "was really the only guy I had in mind to play Tesla because his function in the story is a small but very important role". Nolan contacted Bowie, who initially turned down the part. A lifelong fan, Nolan flew out to New York to pitch the role to Bowie in person, telling him no one else could possibly play the part; Bowie accepted after a few minutes.
- Andy Serkis as Mr. Alley, Tesla's assistant. Serkis said he played Alley with the belief that he was "once a corporation man who got excited by this maverick, Tesla, so jumped ship and went with the maverick". Serkis described Alley as a "gatekeeper", a "conman", and "a mirror image of Michael Caine's character". Serkis, a big fan of Bowie, said he was enjoyable to work with, describing him as "very unassuming, very down to earth... very at ease with himself and funny".
- Ricky Jay as Milton the Magician, an older magician who employs Angier and Borden at the beginning of their careers. Jay and Michael Weber trained Jackman and Bale for their roles with brief instruction in various stage illusions. The magicians gave the actors limited information, allowing them to know enough to pull off a scene.
- Roger Rees as Owens, a solicitor working for Lord Caldlow.
- W. Morgan Sheppard as Merrit, the owner of a theater where Angier initially performs.
- Samantha Mahurin as Jess Borden, the daughter of Borden and Sarah.
- Daniel Davis as the judge presiding over Borden's trial.
- Chao-Li Chi as Chung Ling Soo, a Chinese magician who disguises his great physical strength by pretending to be elderly and frail in all public appearances.

== Production ==
Julian Jarrold's and Sam Mendes' producer approached Christopher Priest for an adaptation of his novel The Prestige. Priest was impressed with Christopher Nolan's films Following and Memento, and subsequently, producer Valerie Dean brought the book to Nolan's attention. In October 2000, Nolan traveled to the United Kingdom to publicize Memento, as Newmarket Films was having difficulty finding a United States distributor. While in London, Nolan read Priest's book and shared the story with his brother Jonathan while walking around in Highgate (a location later featured in the scene where Angier ransoms Borden's stage engineer in Highgate Cemetery). The development process for The Prestige began as a reversal of their earlier collaboration: Jonathan Nolan had pitched his initial story for Memento to his brother during a road trip.

A year later, the option on the book became available and was purchased by Aaron Ryder of Newmarket Films. In late 2001, Nolan became busy with the post-production of Insomnia, and asked his brother to help work on the script. The writing process was a long collaboration between the Nolan brothers, occurring intermittently over a period of five years. In the script, the Nolans emphasized the magic of the story through the dramatic narrative, playing down the visual depiction of stage magic. The three-act screenplay was deliberately structured around the three elements of the film's illusion: the pledge, the turn, and the prestige. "It took a long time to figure out how to achieve cinematic versions of the very literary devices that drive the intrigue of the story," Christopher Nolan told Variety: "The shifting points of view, the idea of journals within journals and stories within stories. Finding the cinematic equivalents of those literary devices was very complex." Although the film is thematically faithful to the novel, two major changes were made to the plot structure during the adaptation process: the novel's spiritualism subplot was removed, and the modern-day frame story was replaced with Borden's wait for the gallows. Priest approved of the adaptation, describing it as "an extraordinary and brilliant script, a fascinating adaptation of my novel."

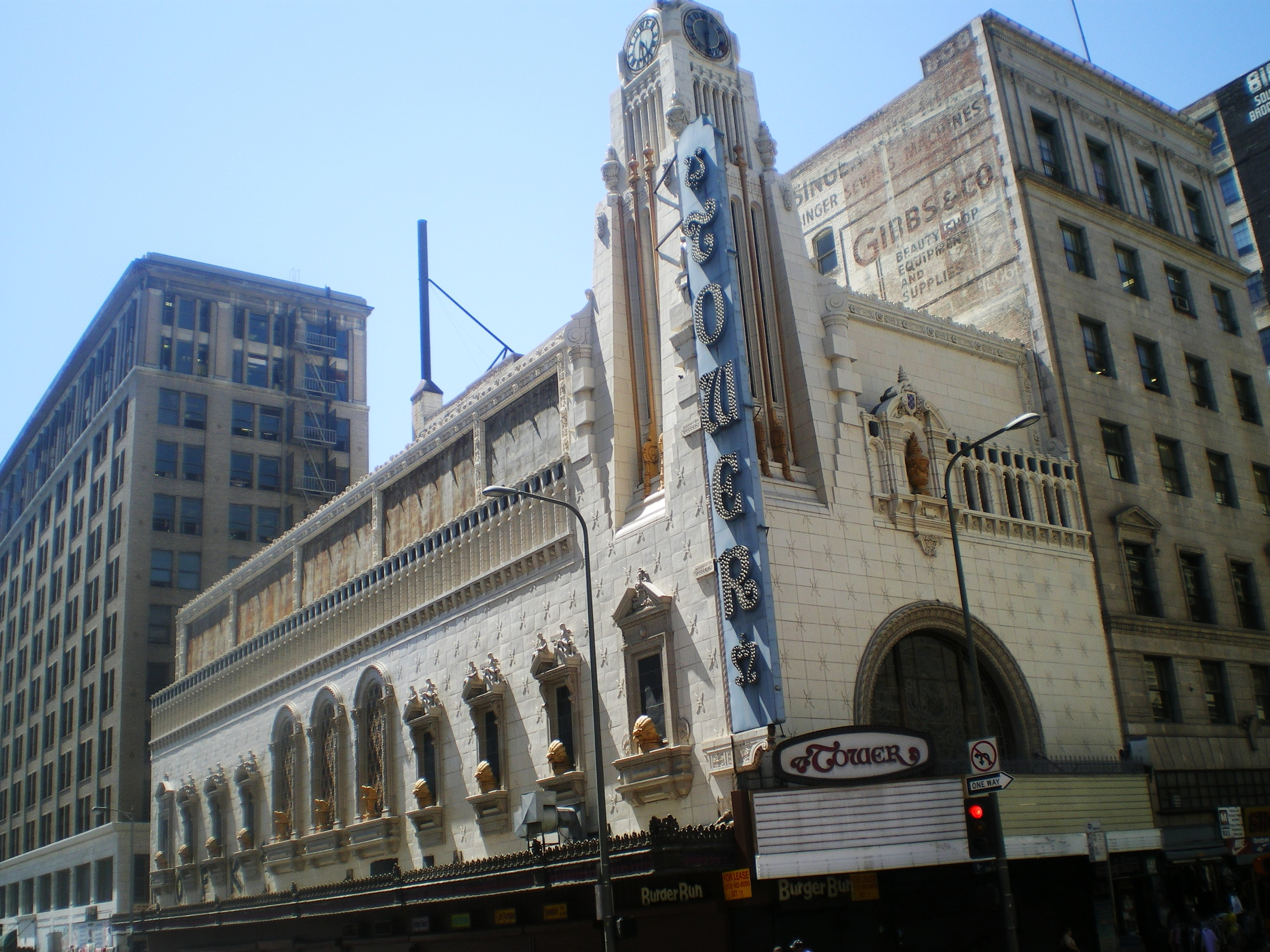
The historic Tower Theatre in Los Angeles was used as the location for the Pantages Theatre in London.

In early 2003, Nolan planned to direct the film before the production of Batman Begins accelerated. Following the release of Batman Begins, Nolan started up the project again, negotiating with Jackman and Bale in October 2005. Josh Hartnett pitched Nolan for a role. While the screenplay was still being written, production designer Nathan Crowley began the set design process in Nolan's garage, employing a "visual script" consisting of scale models, images, drawings, and notes. Jonathan and Christopher Nolan finished the final shooting draft on January 13, 2006, and began production three days later on January 16. Filming ended on April 9.

Crowley and his crew searched Los Angeles for almost 70 locations that resembled fin de siècle London. Jonathan Nolan visited Colorado Springs to research Nikola Tesla and based the electric-bulb scene on actual experiments Tesla conducted. Nathan Crowley helped design the scene for Tesla's invention; it was shot in the parking lot of the Mount Wilson Observatory. Influenced by a "Victorian modernist aesthetic", Crowley chose four locations in the Broadway theater district in downtown Los Angeles for the film's stage magic performances: the Los Angeles Theatre, the Palace Theatre, the Los Angeles Belasco, and the Tower Theatre. Crowley also turned a portion of the Universal back lot into Victorian London. Osgood Castle in Colorado was also used as a location.

Nolan built only one set for the film, an "under-the-stage section that houses the machinery that makes the larger illusions work", preferring to simply dress various Los Angeles locations and sound stages to stand in for Colorado and Victorian England. In contrast to most period pieces, Nolan kept up the quick pace of production by shooting with handheld cameras, and refrained from using artificial lighting in some scenes, relying instead on natural light on location. Costume designer Joan Bergin chose attractive, modern Victorian fashions for Scarlett Johansson; cinematographer Wally Pfister captured the mood with soft earth tones as white and black colors provided background contrasts, bringing actors' faces to the foreground. Editing, scoring, and mixing finished on September 22, 2006.

The Prestige technically contains what is the first IMAX 70 mm film camera shot used in a narrative feature length film. A visual effect shot featuring Christian Bale’s duplicated character was filmed using IMAX cameras so Nolan could test if IMAX footage could be both reduced to 35 mm movie film for wide release, as well as be used in effects sequences, as Nolan planned to use the format for his upcoming film The Dark Knight.

=== Music ===
The film score was written by English musician and composer David Julyan. Julyan had previously collaborated with director Christopher Nolan on Following (1998), Memento (2000), and Insomnia (2002). Following the film's narrative, the soundtrack has three sections: the Pledge, the Turn, and the Prestige.

The song "Analyse" by Radiohead frontman Thom Yorke is played over the credits. "Returner" by Gackt was used as the theme song in the Japanese version.

== Themes ==
The rivalry between Angier and Borden dominates the film. Obsession, secrecy, and sacrifice fuel the battle, as both magicians contribute their fair share to a deadly duel of one-upmanship, with disastrous results. Angier's obsession with beating Borden costs him Cutter's friendship while providing him with a collection of his own dead clones; Borden's obsession with maintaining the secrecy of his twin leads Sarah to question their relationship, eventually resulting in her suicide when she suspects the truth. Angier and one of the twins both lose Olivia's love because of their inhumanity. Finally, Borden is hanged and the last copy of Angier shot. Their struggle is also expressed through class warfare: Borden as The Professor, a working-class magician who gets his hands dirty, versus Angier as The Great Danton, a classy, elitist showman whose accent makes him appear American. Film critic Matt Brunson claimed that a complex theme of duality is exemplified by Angier and Borden, that the film chooses not to depict either magician as good or evil.

Angier's theft of Borden's teleportation illusion in the film echoes many real-world examples of stolen tricks among magicians. Outside the film, similar rivalries include magicians John Nevil Maskelyne and Harry Kellar's dispute over a levitation illusion. Gary Westfahl of Locus Online also notes a "new proclivity for mayhem" in the film over the novel, citing the murder/suicide disposition of Angier's duplicates and intensified violent acts of revenge and counter-revenge. This "relates to a more general alteration in the events and tone of the film" rather than significantly changing the underlying themes.

Nor is this theme of cutthroat competition limited to sleight of hand: the script incorporates the popular notion that Nikola Tesla and Thomas Edison were directly engaged in the war of the currents, a rivalry over electrical standards, which appears in the film in parallel to Angier and Borden's competition for magical supremacy. In the novel, Tesla and Edison serve as foils for Angier and Borden, respectively.

Den Shewman of Creative Screenwriting says the film asks how far one would go to devote oneself to an art. The character of Chung Ling Soo, according to Shewman, is a metaphor for this theme. Film critic Alex Manugian refers to this theme as the "meaning of commitment".

Nicolas Rapold of Film Comment addresses the points raised by Shewman and Manugian in terms of the film's "refracted take on Romanticism":

Angier's technological solution—which suggests art as a sacrifice, a phoenix-like death of the self—and Borden's more meat-and-potatoes form of stagecraft embodies the divide between the artist and the social being.

For Manugian the central theme is "obsession", but he also notes the supporting themes of the "nature of deceit" and "science as magic". Manugian criticizes the Nolans for trying to "ram too many themes into the story".

== Release ==
Touchstone Pictures opted to move the release date forward by a week, from the original October 27, to October 20, 2006. The film earned $14.8 million on opening weekend in the United States, debuting at #1. It grossed $109 million worldwide, including $53 million from the United States. The film received nominations for the Academy Award for Best Art Direction (Nathan Crowley and Julie Ochipinti) and the Academy Award for Best Cinematography (Wally Pfister), as well as a nomination for the Hugo Award for Best Dramatic Presentation, Long Form in 2007. The film was also nominated for both Best Science Fiction Film and Best Costume Design the Saturn Awards.

=== Re-release ===
In July 2026, Disney announced that The Prestige would be theatrically re-released in January 2027 to coincide the film's 20th anniversary. This re-release includes brand new large-format 70mm and IMAX 2D release prints.

=== Critical response ===
On review aggregator Rotten Tomatoes, the film holds an approval rating of 77% based on 206 reviews, with an average rating of 7.5/10. The website's critics consensus reads, "Full of twists and turns, The Prestige is a dazzling period piece that never stops challenging the audience." Metacritic assigned the film a weighted average score of 66 out of 100, based on 36 critics, indicating "generally favorable reviews". Audiences polled by CinemaScore gave the film an average grade of "B" on an A+ to F scale.

Claudia Puig of USA Today described the film as "one of the most innovative, twisting, turning art films of the past decade." Drew McWeeny gave the film a glowing review, saying it demands repeat viewing, with Peter Travers of Rolling Stone agreeing. On At the Movies with Ebert and Roeper, Richard Roeper and guest critic A.O. Scott gave the film a "two thumbs up" rating. Todd Gilchrist of IGN applauded the performances of Jackman and Bale whilst praising Nolan for making "this complex story as easily understandable and effective as he made the outwardly straightforward comic book adaptation (Batman Begins) dense and sophisticated ... any truly great performance is almost as much showmanship as it is actual talent, and Nolan possesses both in spades." CNN.com and Village Voice film critic Tom Charity listed it among his best films of 2006. Philip French of The Observer recommended the film, comparing the rivalry between the two main characters to that of Mozart and Salieri in the highly acclaimed Amadeus.

On the other hand, Dennis Harvey of Variety criticized the film as gimmicky, though he felt the cast did well in underwritten roles. Kirk Honeycutt of The Hollywood Reporter felt that characters "...are little more than sketches. Remove their obsessions, and the two magicians have little personality." Nonetheless, the two reviewers praised David Bowie as Tesla, as well as the production values and cinematography. On a simpler note, Emanuel Levy has said: "Whether viewers perceive The Prestige as intricately complex or just unnecessarily complicated would depend to a large degree on their willingness to suspend disbelief for two hours." He gave the film a B grade.

Roger Ebert gave the film three stars out of four, describing the revelation at the end as a "fundamental flaw" and a "cheat". He wrote, "The pledge of Nolan's The Prestige is that the film, having been metaphorically sawed in two, will be restored; it fails when it cheats, as, for example, if the whole woman produced on the stage were not the same one so unfortunately cut in two." Christopher Priest, who wrote the novel the film is based on, saw it three times as of January 5, 2007, and his reaction was "'Well, holy shit.' I was thinking, 'God, I like that,' and 'Oh, I wish I'd thought of that.'"

The film has grown in stature since its release. In 2009, The A.V. Club named The Prestige as one of the best films of the 2000s. The film was included in American Cinematographer's list of the best-shot films from 1998 to 2008, ranking at 36. More than 17,000 people around the world participated in the final vote. In 2020, Empire ranked it among the 100 greatest films of the 21st century. In 2021, members of the Writers Guild of America West and Writers Guild of America, East placed its screenplay at 82 in their list of the 101 greatest screenplays of the 21st century by that point.

=== Home media ===
The Region 1 disc is by Buena Vista Home Entertainment, and was released on February 20, 2007, and is available on DVD and Blu-ray formats. The Warner Bros. Region 2 DVD was released on March 12, 2007. It is also available in both BD and regionless HD DVD in Europe (before HD DVD was canceled). Special features are minimal, with the documentary Director's Notebook: The Prestige – Five Making-of Featurettes, running roughly twenty minutes combined, an art gallery and the trailer. Nolan did not contribute to a commentary as he felt the film primarily relied on an audience's reaction and did not want to remove the mystery from the story.

The film was released by Warner Bros. Home Entertainment on Ultra HD Blu-ray on December 18, 2017, in the United Kingdom. The film was also released by Touchstone Home Entertainment on Ultra HD Blu-ray on December 19, 2017, in the United States.

== See also ==
- Ship of Theseus – Thought experiment about identity over time
- Teletransportation paradox – Thought experiment on the philosophy of identity

== Bibliography ==
- Kirsch, Konrad (2024). From ›Doodlebug‹ to ›Oppenheimer‹. An Analysis of Christopher Nolan's Film Work. Stuttgart / London: Edition Axel Menges. ISBN 978-3-86905-037-9.
