= A Dream of Wessex =

1977 novel by Christopher Priest

- First edition
- Author: Christopher Priest
- Language: English
- Genre: Science fiction
- Published: 1977 (Faber and Faber)
- Publication place: United Kingdom
- Media type: Print (Hardcover)
- Pages: 199
- ISBN: 0-571-11118-1
- OCLC: 3706713
- Dewey Decimal: 823/.9/14
- LC Class: PZ4.P9487 Dr PR6066.R55

A Dream of Wessex is a 1977 science fiction novel by British writer Christopher Priest. In the United States it was released under the title The Perfect Lover.

== Synopsis ==
A Dream of Wessex can be read as a straightforward story about a group of twentieth-century dreamers who create a consensus virtual-reality future. Once they enter their imaginary world they are unable to remember who they are, or where they are from. On another level, the novel is itself an extended metaphor for the way in which extrapolated futures are created.

The year is 1985. The Wessex Project, a privately funded project based beneath Maiden Castle, discovers a method to transport the collective unconscious of some of England's most brilliant minds into an illusory and ideal society. The object is to gather information vital to human survival on earth. But in the process, power, deception and love join to jeopardize the philanthropic program.

== Characters ==
=== The Projectioners ===
- Julia Stretton - a 27-year-old geologist, the protagonist
- David Harkman - an important member who has been projecting for two full years but who was "missing" from Wessex while working on the mainland; it is Julia's mission to find him, and they fall in love
- Paul Mason - Julia's ex-boyfriend, a charismatic, sometimes cruel megalomaniac who intends to take over the Wessex Project and reform it to match his own ideals
- Donald Mander - an administrator
- John Eliot - a doctor
- Dr. Trowbridge - a founder of the Project
- Marilyn - Julia's friend and ally against Paul Mason
- Steve and Andy - two young men in charge of entering the projection and retrieving participants who have forgotten the "real" world

=== The Projected ===
- Frederick Cro - works with Donald Mander
- Greg - Julia's boyfriend in Wessex, a possessive and not entirely satisfactory lover
- Various artisans, tradespeople, bureaucrats, and tourists

== Critical reception ==
In a critical essay on islands in British science fiction, Paul Kincaid discusses A Dream of Wessex and compares it with other novels.

At roughly the same time Cowper was working on The Road to Corlay, Christopher Priest was creating a similarly drowned Britain in A Dream of Wessex. In this case, however, the island is not a prison but a fortress, a place of warmth and light and joy that is a defense against the cold and forbidding character of his near-future Britain. When a representative of this heartless aspect of post-war Britain [i.e., Paul Mason] invades the sunny, rural island it becomes, briefly, as grey, polluted and miserable as the realm from which the dreamers are trying to escape. Wessex is also, literally, a dream island, a piece of the Mediterranean that has been misplaced in southern England, and in this Priest's islomania is on a par with the intellectual mood of post-war Britain... I don't think any English writer has so consistently weaved islands into the structure of his fiction as Christopher Priest. These are usually exemplars of islomania rather than insularity: he does not want to cut his characters off from society because engagement with others goes to the core of how they reveal their psychology (one reason, perhaps, why twins and doppelgangers feature so frequently in his work).

== Awards ==
A Dream of Wessex was nominated for the Ditmar Award in 1978 for Best International Long Fiction.

== See also ==
- Simulated reality
