= Christopher Priest (novelist) =

English author (1943–2024)

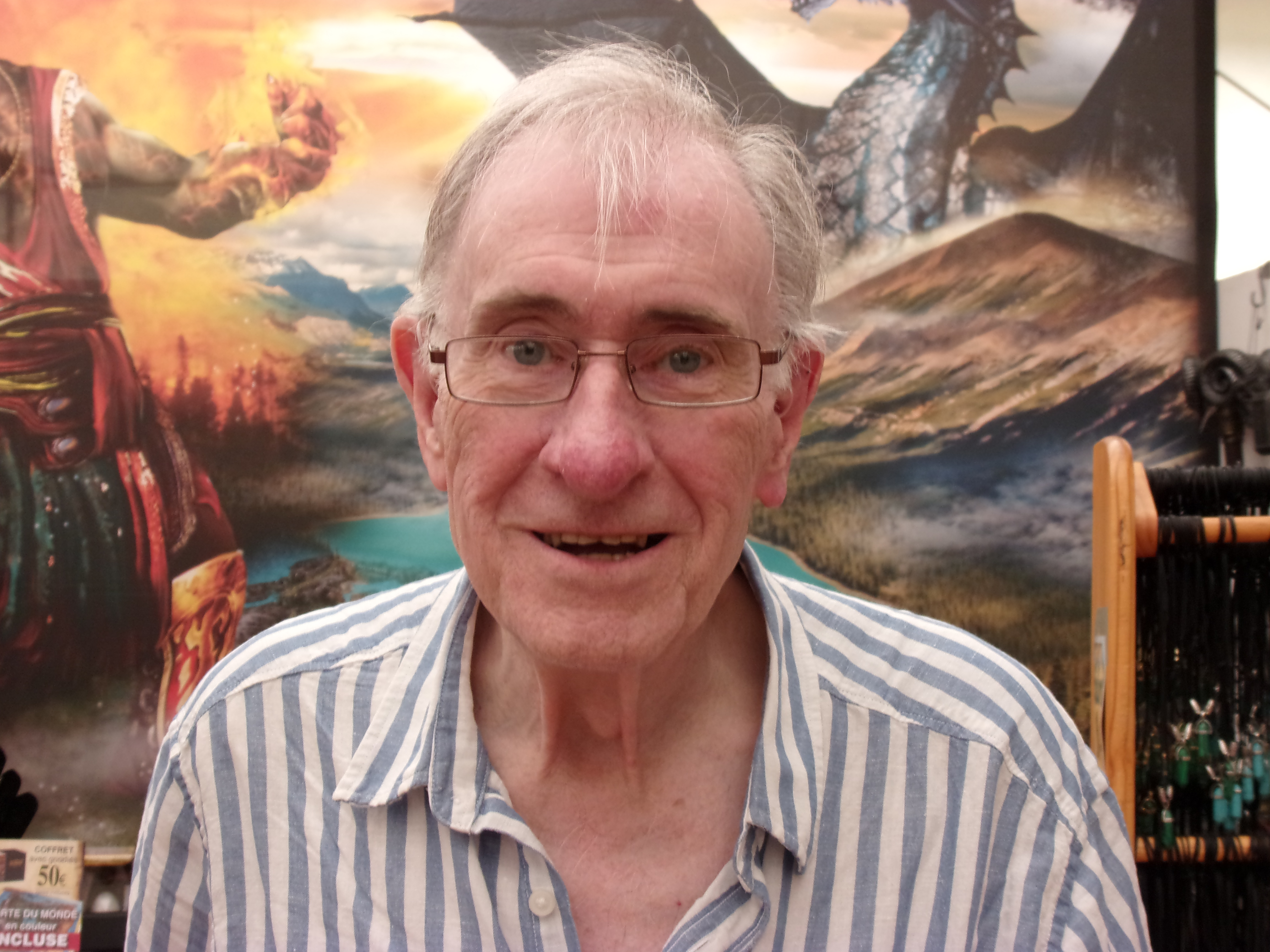
- Priest in 2019
- Born: 14 July 1943; Cheadle, Cheshire, England
- Died: 2 February 2024 (aged 80)
- Occupations: Writer, novelist
- Spouses: Lisa Tuttle (1981–1987) Leigh Kennedy (1988–2011) Nina Allan (m. 2023)
- Children: 2
- Writing career
- Pen name: John Luther Novak, Colin Wedgelock
- Period: 1966–2024
- Genres: Fantasy, horror, science fiction, slipstream
- Notable works: The Inverted World; The Space Machine; The Affirmation; The Glamour; The Prestige; The Separation; The Islanders
- Notable awards: See below
- Website: christopher-priest.co.uk

Christopher Mackenzie Priest (14 July 1943 – 2 February 2024) was an English science fiction writer and novelist. His works include Fugue for a Darkening Island (1972), The Inverted World (1974), The Space Machine (1976), The Affirmation (1981), The Glamour (1984), The Prestige (1995), and The Separation (2002).

Priest was strongly influenced by the science fiction of H. G. Wells and in 2006 was appointed Vice-President of the international H. G. Wells Society.

== Early life ==
Christopher Mackenzie Priest was born on 14 July 1943 in Cheadle, Cheshire, England.

As a child, Priest spent some time holidaying in the English county of Dorset. Here he explored the ancient hillfort of Maiden Castle, near Dorchester, which he would later use as the location for the novel A Dream of Wessex (1977). He began writing soon after leaving school and was a full-time freelance writer from 1968 on.

== Career ==
Priest's first story, "The Run", was published in 1966. Formerly an accountant and audit clerk, he became a full-time writer in 1968. One of his early novels, The Affirmation, concerns a traumatized man who apparently flips into a delusional world in which he experiences a lengthy voyage to an archipelago of exotic islands. This setting played a part in many of Priest's short stories, which raises the question of whether the Dream Archipelago is actually a fantasy. The state of mind depicted in this novel is similar to that of the delusional fantasy-prone psychoanalytic patient ("Kirk Allen") in Robert Lindner's The Fifty-Minute Hour, or Jack London's tortured prisoner in The Star Rover.

Priest also dealt with delusional alternate realities in A Dream of Wessex, in which a group of experimenters for a British government project are brain-wired to a hypnosis machine and jointly participate in an imaginary but as-real-as-real future in a vacation island off the coast of a Sovietized Britain.

His later novels include The Islanders (2011), set in the Dream Archipelago, and The Adjacent (2013), a multi-strand narrative with recurring characters.

Of his narrative's plot twists, Priest told an interviewer in 1995, "my shocks are based on a sudden devastating reversal of what the reader knows or believes."

=== Tie-in work ===
Priest wrote the tie-in novel to accompany the 1999 David Cronenberg movie eXistenZ, which contains themes of the novels A Dream of Wessex and The Extremes. Such themes include the question of the extent to which we can trust what we believe to be reality and our memories.

Priest was approached to write stories for the 18th and 19th seasons of Doctor Who. The first, "Sealed Orders", was a political thriller based on Gallifrey commissioned by script editor Douglas Adams; it was eventually abandoned due to script problems and replaced with "Warriors' Gate". The second, "The Enemy Within", was also eventually abandoned due to script problems and what Priest perceived as insulting treatment after he was asked to modify the script to include the death of Adric. It was replaced by "Earthshock". Priest received payment while Doctor Who producer John Nathan-Turner and script editor Eric Saward were forced to pen a letter of apology for the treatment of the writer.

A film of his novel The Prestige was released on 20 October 2006. It was directed by Christopher Nolan and starred Christian Bale and Hugh Jackman. Despite differences between the novel and screenplay, Nolan was reportedly so concerned the denouement be kept a surprise that the US publisher's tie-in edition of the book was blocked from using any images from the film itself.

=== Pseudonyms ===
Priest is known to have used the pseudonyms John Luther Novak and Colin Wedgelock, usually for movie novelisations, and Donald MacKenzie. As well as the eXistenZ novelization (which undermined the pseudonym by including Priest's biography on the pre-title page), he has novelised the movies Mona Lisa (as John Luther Novak) and Short Circuit (as Colin Wedgelock). Priest co-operated with fellow British science fiction author David Langford on various enterprises under the Ansible brand.

=== Other writing ===
Priest wrote for The Guardian from 2002, largely obituaries of such figures as Robert Sheckley, Stanislaw Lem, Jack Williamson, Diana Wynne Jones, John Christopher and many more.

== Awards and honours ==
Priest won the BSFA award for the best novel four times: in 1974 for Inverted World; in 1998 for The Extremes; in 2002 for The Separation and in 2011 for The Islanders.

Priest won the James Tait Black Memorial Prize for Fiction and the World Fantasy Award (for The Prestige).

Priest won the BSFA award for short fiction in 1979 for the short story "Palely Loitering", and was nominated for Hugo Awards in the categories of Best Novel, Best Novella, Best Novelette, and Best Non-Fiction Book (this last for The Book on the Edge of Forever (also known as Last Deadloss Visions), an exploration of the unpublished Last Dangerous Visions anthology). The Space Machine won the International SF prize in the 1977 Ditmar Awards The Locus Index to SF Awards: 1977 Ditmar Awards. Priest's 1979 essay "The Making of the Lesbian Horse" (published as a Novacon chapbook) takes a humorous look at the roots of his acclaimed novel Inverted World. He was guest of honour at Novacon 9 in 1979 and Novacon 30 in 2000, and at the 63rd World Science Fiction Convention in 2005.

In 1983 Priest was named one of the 20 Granta Best of Young British Novelists. In 1988 he won the Kurd-Laßwitz-Preis for The Glamour as Best Foreign Fiction Book.

Between 7 November and 7 December 2007, the Chelsea College of Art and Design had an exhibition in its gallery Chelsea Space inspired by Priest's novel The Affirmation. It followed "themes of personal history and memory (which) through the lens of a more antagonistic and critical form of interpretation, aims to point towards an overtly positive viewpoint on contemporary art practice over any traditional melancholy fixation".

== Personal life and death ==
Priest lived in Devon, and later on the Isle of Bute. He was married to writer Lisa Tuttle from 1981 to 1987, and from 1988 to 2011 to Leigh Kennedy, with whom he had twins. He later lived with speculative fiction writer Nina Allan until his death, by which time Allan had become his wife.

Priest died from small-cell carcinoma on 2 February 2024, at the age of 80.

== Bibliography ==
=== Novels ===
- Indoctrinaire. London: Faber and Faber, 1970.
- Fugue for a Darkening Island. London: Faber and Faber, 1972. Campbell nominee, 1973.
- The Inverted World. London: Faber and Faber, 1974. BSFA winner, 1974, Hugo Award nominee, 1975.
- The Space Machine. London: Faber and Faber, 1976.
- A Dream of Wessex (US title The Perfect Lover). London: Faber and Faber, 1977.
- The Affirmation. London: Faber and Faber, 1981. BSFA nominee, 1981.
- The Glamour. London: Jonathan Cape, 1984. BSFA nominee, 1984.
- Short Circuit. Sphere Books, 1986. (Film tie-in novelisation as Colin Wedgelock)
- Mona Lisa. Sphere Books, 1986. (Film tie-in novelisation as John Luther Novak)
- The Quiet Woman. London: Bloomsbury, 1990.
- The Prestige. London: Simon and Schuster, 1995. BSFA nominee, 1995; World Fantasy Award winner, James Tait Black Memorial Prize winner, Clarke Awards nominee, 1996.
- The Extremes. London: Simon and Schuster, 1998. BSFA winner, 1998; Clarke Award nominee, 1999.
- eXistenZ. Harper, 1999. (Film tie-in novelisation)
- The Separation. Scribner, 2002. Old Earth Books 2005—BSFA winner, 2002; Clarke Award winner, Campbell Award nominee, Sidewise Award nominee, 2003.
- The Islanders. Gollancz, 2011. BSFA winner, 2011; Campbell Award winner, 2012.
- The Adjacent. Gollancz, 20 June 2013.
- The Gradual. Gollancz, 2016.
- An American Story. Gollancz, 2018.
- The Evidence. Gollancz, 2020.
- Expect Me Tomorrow. Gollancz, 2022.
- Airside. Gollancz, 2023.

=== Short story collections ===
- Real-time World. New English Library, 1974. Reissued by GrimGrin Studio 2008.
- An Infinite Summer. Faber and Faber, 1979. Three stories reissued in The Dream Archipelago.
- The Dream Archipelago. Earthlight, 1999. Reissued 2009.
- Ersatz Wines – Instructive Short Stories GrimGrin Studio, 2008. Anthology of early works.
- Episodes, Gollancz, 2019.

=== Short story in anthology, also as editor ===
- Anticipations. Faber and Faber, 1978. ISBN 0571112072 OCLC 472695502 ASIN 0571112072

- Watson, Ian. Indhold:The Very Slow Time Machine
- Sheckley, Robert. Is That What People Do?
- Shaw, Bob. Amphitheatre
- Priest, Christopher. The Negation
- Harrison, Harry. The Greening Of The Green
- Disch, Thomas M.. Mutability
- Ballard, J.G.. One Afternoon At Utah Beach
- Aldiss, Brian W.. A Chinese Perspective

=== Screenplay ===
- The Stooge. 2010 or 2011.

=== Selected non-fiction ===
- Your Book of Film-Making. London: Faber and Faber, 1974.
- The Making of the Lesbian Horse. Novacon 9 for the Birmingham Science Fiction Group, 1979. Priest attended as the Guest of Honour.
- The Book on the Edge of Forever. Seattle: Fantagraphics, 1993.
- "Christopher Priest's Top 10 Slipstream Books". 2003. An essay for London's The Guardian, listing ten seminal novels of the slipstream genre, including works by J. G. Ballard, Angela Carter, Borges, Steve Erickson, and Steven Millhauser.
- "Foreword" to Stephen E. Andrews' and Nick Rennison's 100 Must-Read Science Fiction Novels. London: A&C Black Academic and Professional/Bloomsbury Publishing, 2006. ISBN 978-0-7136-7585-6.
- The Magic – The Story of a Film. Hastings: GrimGrin Studio, 2008.
- "La Jetée". Essay in Cinema Futura: Essays on Favourite Science Fiction Movies, edited by Mark Morris. PS Publishing, 2010. ISBN 978-1-84863-095-6.
- The Recollections: Fragments from a Life in Writing . Briardene Books, 2026.

=== About the author ===
- Butler, Andrew M., ed. Christopher Priest: The Interaction (London: Science Fiction Foundation, 2005).
- Kincaid, Paul. The Unstable Realities of Christopher Priest (Canterbury, UK: Gylphi, 2020).
- Ruddick, Nicholas. Christopher Priest (Mercer Island, WA: Starmont House, 1990).
