= The Space Machine =

1976 novel by Christopher Priest

- First edition (publ. Faber & Faber)
- Author: Christopher Priest
- Language: English
- Publication date: 1976

The Space Machine, subtitled A Scientific Romance, is a science fiction novel written by English writer Christopher Priest.

First published in 1976, it follows the travels of protagonists Edward Turnbull and Amelia Fitzgibbon. The pair are dropped on the surface of Mars (due to interference by Turnbull) prior to the Martian invasion of Earth that forms the storyline of H. G. Wells' 1898 novel The War of the Worlds. Edward and Amelia, who works for the inventor Sir William Reynolds, have used Reynolds's space and time machine to jump into the future at the onset of the Mars invasion. They find that, on Mars, humans have been turned into Martian slaves.

== Setting ==
This novel effectively binds the storylines of the H. G. Wells novels The War of the Worlds (1898) and The Time Machine (1895) into the same reality. Action takes place both in Victorian England and on Mars, as the time machine displaces the duo through space (in addition to time).

Technology is shown to be roughly Victorian of nature, so as not to destroy the setting for War of the Worlds, but also shows some unpublished advancements of Sir William Reynolds (such as a form of bicycle that requires no input from the rider).

The names of the characters also suggest historical Britain. Both Edward's name and Fitzgibbon's refer to Edward Gibbon, the famous British historian and author of The History of the Decline and Fall of the Roman Empire, while Turnbull is suggestive of, among others, the famous early British actor John Turnbull and, more generally, the Bulldog, which is popularly used to represent Britain and its defiance in war.

== Publication history ==
The book was first published in 1976 by Faber and Faber Limited (ISBN 0571109314). It was republished in paperback by Pan Books in 1981 (ISBN 0330263455) and by Gollancz's VGSF imprint in 1988 (ISBN 0-575-03994-9).

== Reception ==
Richard A. Lupoff described The Space Machine as "a completely new, gripping, and ingenious book," although he faulted the relatively slow pacing of its opening segment

The aggregate review journal Books & Authors quoted a reviewer who observed that Priest "has gone to strenuous efforts to channel the spirit of H.G. Wells and succeeds quite well in spinning a space opera in a style consistent with its Victorian setting." However, the same contributor suggested that the novel "would have been a more satisfying book had the author modernised the science fiction elements, but kept the authentic period writing style".

== Awards ==
It won a Ditmar Award in 1977, winning the "International SF" category.
