= The Affirmation =

1981 novel by Christopher Priest

- First edition
- Author: Christopher Priest
- Language: English
- Genre: Science fiction
- Publisher: Faber and Faber
- Publication date: 1981
- Publication place: United Kingdom
- Media type: Print (Hardcover)
- Pages: 213
- ISBN: 0-571-11684-1
- OCLC: 8031278

The Affirmation is a 1981 science fiction novel by British writer Christopher Priest. The book follows the story of Peter Sinclair, who begins creating fantasy fiction, only to find his life merging with that of the book’s protagonist. The novel eventually earned praise among reviewers as one of Priest's best works.

== Synopsis ==
Peter Sinclair endures professional unemployment and the breakup of a long-term relationship, and tries to escape his self-perceived newfound social marginality through creating an intricate fantasy fiction. In this world, he depicts himself as the winner of a lottery in the (fictional) Dream Archipelago, where the jackpot prize is a complex medical and neural operation (“athanasia”) that will ensure immortality. His fictional/alternate self must travel from Jethra, Faiandland's capital, to claim the treatment prize. As he writes, working ever deeper into his psyche, Sinclair finds that his two identities are starting to merge, although it may also be the case that Peter is experiencing visual and auditory hallucination symptoms attributable to the onset of schizophrenia. The novel's climax leaves the fact ambiguous as to which world is real and which is fantasy, with the novel ending in the same unfinished sentence as Sinclair's manuscript.

== Related works ==
There are subsequent references to many aspects of The Affirmation in Priest's later short story collections, The Dream Archipelago (1999) and The Islanders (2011). In these stories, it is uncertain whether this means that Sinclair is validly experiencing an alternate reality, or schizophrenia through visual and auditory hallucinations of that "reality."

== Reception ==
Dave Pringle reviewed The Affirmation for Imagine magazine, and stated that "it is slow-moving, painstaking, flatly-written ... and yet it builds up a charge - it moves the reader. This is an honest, baffled (and baffling) work of art, in which Priest has found his perfect subject matter." In his 2020 book The Unstable Realities of Christopher Priest, Paul Kincaid recalls that "reviews were lukewarm" for The Affirmation when it was first published, but it is "now generally recognized as one of his finest novels." The book 100 Must-Read Science Fiction Novels also mentions it among Priest's best works.

=== Awards ===
The Affirmation won the Ditmar Award in 1982 for Best International Long Fiction, and was nominated for the 1981 BSFA Award.
