= Old Earth Books =

American specialty publisher

Old Earth Books is a speciality publisher which specializes in out-of-print and niche books, primarily in the science fiction genre. The name comes from the Cordwainer Smith Lords of the Instrumentality series. It is located in Baltimore, MD. It was founded and is operated by Michael Walsh.

== History ==
Old Earth was founded in 1993, with the publication of a short story collection, Rude Astronauts, by Allen Steele. Its greatest commercial success came with the re-printing of the Lensman series, by E. E. Smith, starting in 1997.

== Authors ==
Old Earth concentrates on re-prints and original work from established writers. Authors published include: Edward Whittemore, Avram Davidson, Christopher Priest, Clifford Simak, Edgar Pangborn, Michael Swanwick, and Howard Waldrop. Swanwick's book was nominated for a Hugo Award and won the Locus Award in 2002 for Best Non-Fiction book.

== Market ==
Publisher Walsh believes that there have been many changes in trade publishing over the last several decades that allow room for a small imprint such as his to flourish. When asked his marketing strategy he said, "I publish books I like and think other people will like to read." While print on demand could be used by the traditional publishers, they are not set up for that business model, and thus cede the smaller volume publishing to companies such as Old Earth. Old Earth books are printed using traditional offset methods.
