= Night Visions (TV series) =

American horror anthology television series

- Genre: Horror; Science fiction Mystery; Thriller
- Created by: Dan Angel; Billy Brown
- Presented by: Henry Rollins
- Starring: Various
- Theme music composer: George S. Clinton
- Composers: George S. Clinton; Frank Macchia
- Country of origin: United States
- Original language: English
- No. of seasons: 1
- No. of episodes: 13

Production
- Production locations: Vancouver, Canada
- Running time: 43-44 min.
- Production companies: Angel/Brown Productions; Warner Bros. Television

Original release
- Network: Fox; Sci Fi Channel
- Release: July 12, 2001 – September 24, 2002

Night Visions is an American television horror anthology television series, with each episode comprising two half-hour stories dealing with themes of the supernatural or simply the dark side of human nature. It was produced by Warner Bros. Television for the Fox network, originally airing from 2001 to 2002. Musician Henry Rollins was the uncredited host of the show.

== Production ==
The working title for the show was Night Terrors. It was created by Dan Angel and Billy Brown, who had both previously worked on John Carpenter's 1993 horror anthology Body Bags, as well as the Goosebumps series that aired on Fox Kids between 1995 and 1998. Interest in the project they were developing was heightened following the box office success of the 1999 supernatural film The Sixth Sense. In an interview from when the show was still in the planning stages, Angel said that it was going to focus on "psychologically disturbing, suspense-driven, rich character stories". Filming for the pilot began during July 2000 in Vancouver, Canada. Vancouver was chosen as the filming location since it would help keep costs down. The show was produced by Warner Bros., and aired by Fox, with Fox exercising a degree of creative control over the show. Fox and Warner Bros. had a similar arrangement with Buffy: The Vampire Slayer, which aired on Warner's WB Network, despite being produced by Fox. Veteran punk and metal singer Henry Rollins got hired as host after discussions with Fox executives, who in the summer of 2000 had wanted him to play a recurring role on their popular sci-fi series The X-Files. Rollins was unable to accept the role in The X-Files since it clashed with an upcoming summer European tour he was going to do with his musical group Rollins Band, in support of their 2000 album Get Some Go Again. As a result of this clash, Fox instead offered Rollins the Night Visions role, which he accepted. In a 2001 interview, Rollins remarked "It's kind of a Twilight Zone-thing and I'm the Rod Serling. It's awesome. I got the job last year, and I'm working on it now and again up in Vancouver. Really nice people, really good material. That's the best part of it, really. If it's bad material it doesn't matter how much money they're throwing at you, it's not worth it."

Originally, Night Visions was not going to feature a host. Billy Brown stated in 2008, "I never wanted a host. There should have been an introductory voice-over, a la Outer Limits. But the network said 'No host, no show'. So we started looking, and actually got a commitment from Gary Oldman. Having played Dracula, and being a fantastic actor, he would have been a real presence. The network said no. They wanted Henry Rollins. I didn't get it, nor did anyone else on the show's staff. It seemed like someone's desperate idea to make the show hip." Regarding Fox's involvement in the creative process, Brown said "They [Fox] said many conflicting things. We had a chance to option an incredible Dean Koontz short story that was just terrifying, and they nixed that because it was too scary. And yet they complained that other stories weren't scary enough." In 2001, Dan Angel said he believed that one of the show's strengths was that it covered several different types of stories, saying "It's a nice mix. Pretty much, it's good psychological thrillers, psychological terror, a little bit of sci-fi, but not a lot. There are some killers on the loose once in a while; there's some monsters once in a while. It's really a mix of everything."

The show's directors included some best known for feature films, including Tobe Hooper and Joe Dante, and others, such as Brian Dennehy, JoBeth Williams, and Bill Pullman, known primarily as actors. Whoopi Goldberg expressed an interest in directing a segment for Night Visions, but was unable to due to scheduling issues. The segment "Rest Stop" features Amy Jo Johnson, who was known for playing the Pink Ranger on the Fox Kids series Mighty Morphin' Power Rangers. Johnson later moved to Canada and became a citizen of the country, although when she filmed her Night Visions role in Vancouver, she was still a resident of California.

== Broadcast history ==
The show was originally scheduled to debut on Fox on October 6, 2000, alongside science fiction program Freakylinks. The pilot that was going to air consisted of "The Passenger List" and "The Occupant". The October 2000 premiere never eventuated, with reality show Police Videos airing in its place. It was then scheduled to premiere in the mid-season during January 2001. Fox's reasoning for the move was since the show would have more publicity airing by itself, rather than alongside a similar program such as Freakylinks. However, the January 2001 premiere was scrapped and the show was delayed again since there were threats of an actors' and writers' strike happening around that time. It eventually aired on Fox from July 12 to September 6, 2001 as a summer filler. Billy Brown reflected "There was a changing of the guard at Fox between the time we filmed the pilot and the time the network was ready to order the series. The new regime wasn't convinced an anthology would work, yet everyone agreed that the pilot was good. I had the feeling the network didn't think the show was hip enough." The pilot that aired in July 2001 replaced "The Occupant" with another segment titled "The Bokor", and "The Occupant" would later air in 2001 paired with another segment.

It was picked up by the Sci Fi Channel, which reran the series beginning June 14, 2002. During September 2002, Sci Fi broadcast the final three remaining episodes that never aired on Fox. One of these, "Cargo/Switch", ran as part of the Night Visions series, while the two other episodes' segments ("Patterns", "The Maze", "Harmony" and "Voices") were edited into the Sci Fi Channel film Shadow Realm, minus the Rollins introductions and the Night Visions name. Reruns of the series also aired on cable channel Chiller. Internationally, the show was broadcast on the free-to-air Nine Network in Australia during the 2000s. In Australia, it also aired on the subscription channel Fox8, which was partly owned by Fox/News Corporation, and which had an arrangement to air shows from the American Fox Network. In Brazil, the show also aired on both free-to-air and subscription channels, being shown on the free SBT and the subscription Warner Channel, which focused on programs produced by Warner Brothers. The show aired in Brazil with subtitles, rather than having a Portuguese dub. In addition, the show has also aired in countries such as Italy, the Philippines, Malaysia and South Africa.

Warner Bros. have never released the show to DVD, and up until 2024, had also never officially released it to streaming. In 2024, the series was made available on the free streaming site Plex. In October 2025, the show was added to the free streaming site Tubi, which is owned by Fox Corporation, who also own the show's original broadcaster the Fox Network. When the show was added to streaming sites, the episodes were given new higher resolution prints. Previously, the only prints of the show that unofficially existed online were television recordings from the Fox Network, Chiller and the Brazilian Warner Channel.

== Reception ==
The Washington Post labelled Night Visions a "creepy relief from reality" in July 2001. Michael Speier of Variety praised the show in his 2001 review, commenting "[It] is too good to get lost in the land of summer reruns. Show was bumped from the network's fall schedule last year, proving once again that execs have zero tolerance for anthology series. What a mistake — it's one of the most genuinely edgy shows on television, and it could find an audience with the right promotional push." Scifi.com critic Kathie Huddleston called it "one of the best horror anthologies to hit the tube in a long, long time", adding that "the focus is on the psychological elements of suspense." The Pittsburgh Post-Gazette had a more negative review at the time, criticizing "laughable narration from meathead rocker Henry Rollins and an overreliance on violent plot twists".

Night Visions has been favorably compared to other horror/sci-fi anthology shows, particularly The Twilight Zone, although The Washington Post claimed that it was "far more graphic and scary" than The Twilight Zone. The 2003 edition of The Year's Best Fantasy and Horror described Rollins as "a tattooed and muscle-shirted Rod Serling surrogate." In their 2008 book Science Fiction Television Series, 1990-2004, authors Frank Garcia and Mark Phillips commented that the show "had a look of quality: Locations were varied, the photography created an ambiance of dread, and even when an ending was predictable, more often than not, it worked." In 2018, Bloody Disgusting labelled it a "damn good horror anthology series", while HorrorNews.net reflected in 2020 that the show was "unceremoniously dumped by Fox without a fair chance to find an audience". In 2022, Game Rant included it on a list of "8 Forgotten Anthology Horror Shows", labelling it a "more-than-solid collection of creepy tales with elements of sci-fi and psychological horror", and calling Rollins a "strange but fun choice" as host.

== Episodes ==
13 color episodes in 43-minute format (not counting commercials):

No.	Title	Directed by	Original release date
1a	"The Passenger List"	Yves Simoneau	July 12, 2001
A transportation safety official investigating the crash of an airplane begins to fear that his daughter was on board the plane when it crashed; he begins to experience increasing events of déjà vu as the unexplained romantic attraction to a woman who lost her family in the crash also increases. Starring Aidan Quinn, Kelly Rutherford, Paul Guilfoyle
1b	"The Bokor"	Keith Gordon	July 12, 2001
A medical student identifies a cadaver as a voodoo priest and hesitates to autopsy the body. Starring Samantha Mathis, Jason London, Ben Bass, Kim Hawthorne
2a	"Dead Air"	Jefery Levy	July 12, 2001
A late-night radio show DJ begins to get strange calls, as events through the night convince him that the caller is up to more than a mere prank. Starring Lou Diamond Phillips, Malcolm Scott, Meghan Black, Ryan Taylor
2b	"Renovation"	Brian Dennehy	July 12, 2001
A man experiences flashbacks to his new home's past as he starts a new life with his wife and baby. Starring Gil Bellows, Kirsten Robek, Jon Cuthbert, Merrilyn Gann, Katharine Tobin
3a	"A View Through the Window"^{[note1]}	Bill Pullman	July 19, 2001
A military scientist is compelled to investigate the strange appearance of a lush farm in the middle of a desert. Starring Bill Pullman, Carl Lumbly, Don Wallace, Emily Holmes, Carin Moffat, Todd Talbot, Sean Campbell
3b	"Quiet Please"	Joe Dante	July 19, 2001
A man tries to escape the din of a city under the threat of a serial killer, only to be harassed in the woods by a strange old man and his dog. Starring Cary Elwes, Brian Dennehy, Gus Lynch
4a	"Now He's Coming Up the Stairs"	Nick Gomez	July 26, 2001
A psychiatrist with the ability to absorb the illnesses of his patients comes upon a situation that may be more than he can handle. Starring Luke Perry, Allison Hossack, Sam MacMillan, Donna Yamamoto, Hrothgar Mathews, Shauna Kain, Mark Schooley, Nancy Sivak, Bryce Hodgson
4b	"Used Car"	Michael W. Watkins	July 26, 2001
A woman receives a new car as a gift from her husband, only to find that the car and its previous owner have a history, and a vendetta. Starring Sherilyn Fenn, Hart Bochner, Steve Makaj, Jenn Bird, Jacqueline Samuda
5a	"Rest Stop"	Yves Simoneau	August 2, 2001
A couple picks up a hitchhiker on a quiet country road, and discover that the local rest area is more than meets the eye. Starring Jerry O'Connell, Amy Jo Johnson, Catherine Barroll, David Kopp, Jo Ann Mac Donald, Katharine Isabelle, Mark Hildreth
5b	"After Life"	Jefery Levy	August 2, 2001
A man returns to life in the middle of his funeral, and attempts to adjust to his reincarnated existence. Starring Randy Quaid, Susan Gibney, Terence Kelly, Eric Schneider, Andy Thompson, Meghan Black
6a	"If a Tree Falls..."	Po-Chih Leong	August 9, 2001
Three college students apparently die in a freak car accident and, in order to stay simultaneously both alive and dead like Schrödinger's cats, must keep the accident a secret. Starring Natasha Lyonne, Art Kitching, Jonathan Jackson, Ed Evanko, Scott Nicholson
6b	"The Occupant"	Joe Dante	August 9, 2001
A divorcee becomes increasingly distraught as she notices things in her house are being moved around while she is not home. Starring Bridget Fonda, Anthony Harrison, Dion Luther, Johannah Newmarch
7a	"Reunion"	Thomas J. Wright	August 16, 2001
On the 10th anniversary of a battle in the first Gulf War, a veteran experiencing flashbacks and hallucinations reunites with the members of his company. Starring M. Emmet Walsh, Jay Mohr, Ron Canada, Jane Sowerby, Chuma Hunter-Gault, Kavan Smith, Aaron Pearl, Zoran, Bryan Leslie
7b	"Neighborhood Watch"	Bryan Spicer	August 16, 2001
After a community is notified that a sexual predator has been released in their neighborhood, the residents' suburban eden is threatened. Starring David Paymer, Valerie Mahaffey, Peter Kent, Lauren Diewold, Britt McKillip, Don Thompson, David Millbern, Malcolm Stewart, Ray Galletti
8a	"Bitter Harvest"	Philip Sgriccia	August 23, 2001
A farm boy's mistake costs his neighbor both arms, and when he is forced to work for the man a game of cat and mouse ensues. Starring Jack Palance, Brendan Fletcher, Mark Houghton, Jane Perry, Chris Lovick, Ryan McDonald
8b	"My So-Called Life and Death"^{[note2]}	Ernest Dickerson	August 23, 2001
A young girl develops a crush on a handyman working near her family's summer home but when she finds that he can't see or hear her, she begins to suspect that he's a ghost. Starring Marla Sokoloff, Wanda Cannon, Steve Bacic, William Pavey, Kurt Max Runte
9a	"The Doghouse"	JoBeth Williams	August 30, 2001
A man seeking shelter from a loan shark out to get him finds that there are more dangerous things in this world. Starring Stephen Baldwin, Jane Adams, Bill Croft
9b	"Still Life"	Ernest Dickerson	August 30, 2001
A day in the life of a woman becomes the setting for a far more horrific reality. Starring Mare Winningham, Peter Wingfield, Kirsten Prout, Taras Kostyuk, Brian Jensen, Anaya Farrell, Deryl Hayes, Michelle Hart
10a	"Hate Puppet"	Thomas J. Wright	September 6, 2001
A man investigates the reason why everyone around him seems to instantly respond to him with hatred and anger. Starring Chad Lowe, William Atherton, Helene Joy, Torquil Campbell, Monica Hamburg, Michael Kopsa, Kim Kondrashoff, Kwesi Ameyaw
10b	"Darkness"	Ian Toynton	September 6, 2001
A man inherits a house from his rich uncle, not realizing all that comes with it. Starring Michael Rapaport, Ken Pogue, Marilyn Norry, Lindsay Clague, Arthur Corber, Anthony Ulc, David Mackay, Francis Boyle
11a	"The Maze"	Tobe Hooper	September 19, 2002
A young college student wanders into a hedge maze and comes out in an apparently deserted version of her campus. Starring Thora Birch, Amanda Plummer, Luke Edwards, Chiara Zanni
11b	"Harmony"	Paul Shapiro	September 19, 2002
In a town where music is outlawed, a stranger appears and attempts to convince the townsfolk they have nothing to fear. Starring Timothy Olyphant, Tracy Middendorf, Shirley Knight, Chilton Crane, Michael Hogan, James Kirk, Mitchell Kosterman, Justin Chatwin
12a	"Cargo"	Tobe Hooper	September 23, 2002
A cargo officer on a freighter discovers that the cargo on board contains more than mere crates and packages. Starring Jamie Kennedy, Philip Baker Hall, Jon Cuthbert, Micah Gardener, Asja Pavlovic, Vladimir Moskovshenko, Joanna Pacula
12b	"Switch"	Jefery Levy	September 23, 2002
A psychiatrist attempts to help a young woman synergize the multiple personalities she suffers from. Starring Pam Grier, James Hutson, Cameron Gilley, Allie Mickelson, Shylo Sharity, Brent Glenen, Kyle Labine, Justin Stillwell, Natasha Gregson Wagner
13a	"Patterns"	Keith Gordon	September 24, 2002
An obsessive-compulsive man confronts a therapist with a stunning claim—his behaviors keep the fabric of reality together. Starring Malcolm McDowell, Miguel Ferrer, John B. Lowe, Anna Hagan, John Dadey, Matthew Munn, Giacomo Baessato, Terry Howson
13b	"Voices"	Ian Toynton	September 24, 2002
A deaf woman undergoes experimental surgery to restore her hearing, only to find that she can hear more than merely what people are saying. Starring Lombardo Boyar, Terrylene, John Finn Gillian Barber, Lorena Gale, Cory Dagg, Jerry Walliser, Sam Boniface, Don House, John Moore, Cameron Bright

== Notes ==
1. Based on the short story "Window" by Bob Leman (credited as Robert Leman).
2. Although this is the title as given in the story's introduction, it is alternatively listed in the credits as "My So Called Life & Death".
