= Science fiction =

Literary genre

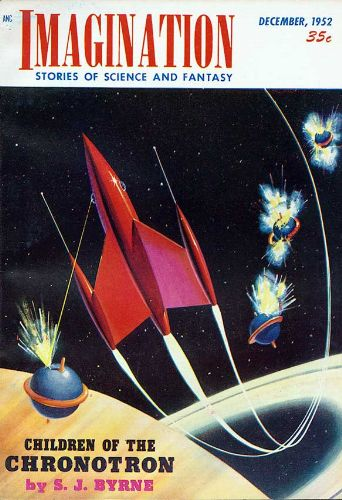
Cover of Imagination, an American science fiction and fantasy pulp magazine (1952)

Science fiction (often shortened to sci-fi or abbreviated SF) is the genre of speculative fiction that imagines advanced and futuristic changes in technology, scientific knowledge, or biological systems. The elements common to science fiction have increased over time: from space exploration, extraterrestrial life, time travel, and robotics; to parallel universes, dystopian societies, and biological manipulations; and, most recently, to information technology, transhumanism, posthumanism, and environmental challenges. Science fiction often explores human responses to the consequences of these types of projected or imagined scientific advances.

The precise definition of science fiction has long been disputed among authors, critics, scholars, and readers. It contains many subgenres, including hard science fiction, which emphasizes scientific accuracy, and soft science fiction, which focuses on social sciences. Other notable subgenres are: space opera, which emphasizes pure adventure in a universe in which space travel is common; cyberpunk, which explores the interface between technology and society; and climate fiction, which addresses environmental issues.

Precedents for science fiction are claimed to exist as far back as antiquity. Some books written in the Scientific Revolution and the Enlightenment Age were considered early science-fantasy stories. The modern genre arose primarily in the 19th and early 20th centuries, when popular writers began looking to technological progress for inspiration and speculation. Mary Shelley's Frankenstein, written in 1818, is often credited as the first true science fiction novel. Jules Verne and H. G. Wells are pivotal figures in the genre's development. In the 20th century, the genre grew during the Golden Age of Science Fiction, and it expanded with the introduction of space operas, dystopian literature, and pulp magazines.

Science fiction has come to influence not only literature, but also film, television, and culture at large. Science fiction can criticize present-day society and explore alternatives, as well as provide entertainment and inspire a sense of wonder.

== Definitions ==
The Encyclopedia of Science Fiction, edited by John Clute and Peter Nicholls in 1993, contains an extensive discussion of the problem of defining the genre.

American writer and professor of biochemistry Isaac Asimov wrote, "Science fiction can be defined as that branch of literature which deals with the reaction of human beings to changes in science and technology."

Science fiction writer Robert A. Heinlein wrote, "A handy short definition of almost all science fiction might read: realistic speculation about possible future events, based solidly on adequate knowledge of the real world, past and present, and on a thorough understanding of the nature and significance of the scientific method."

American science fiction author and editor Lester del Rey wrote, "Even the devoted aficionado or fan—has a hard time trying to explain what science fiction is," and no "full satisfactory definition" exists because "there are no easily delineated limits to science fiction."

Another definition is provided in The Literature Book by the publisher DK: "scenarios that are at the time of writing technologically impossible, extrapolating from present-day science...[,]...or that deal with some form of speculative science-based conceit, such as a society (on Earth or another planet) that has developed in wholly different ways from our own."

There is a tendency among science fiction enthusiasts to be their own arbiters in deciding what constitutes science fiction. David Seed says that it may be more useful to talk about science fiction as the intersection of other more concrete subgenres. American science fiction author, editor, and critic Damon Knight summed up the difficulty, saying "Science fiction is what we point to when we say it."

=== Alternative terms ===
American magazine editor, science fiction writer, and literary agent Forrest J Ackerman has been credited with first using the term sci-fi (reminiscent of the then-trendy term hi-fi) in about 1954. The first known use in print was a description of Donovan's Brain by movie critic Jesse Zunser in January 1954. As science fiction entered popular culture, writers and fans in the field came to associate the term with low-quality pulp science fiction and with low-budget, low-tech B movies. By the 1970s, critics in the field, such as Damon Knight and Terry Carr, were using sci fi to distinguish hack-work from serious science fiction.

Australian literary scholar and critic Peter Nicholls wrote ca. 1993 that SF (or sf) is "the preferred abbreviation within the community of sf writers and readers."

Robert Heinlein found the term science fiction insufficient to describe certain types of works in this genre, and he suggested that the term speculative fiction be used instead for works that are more "serious" or "thoughtful".

== Literature ==
=== Antiquity to 18th century ===
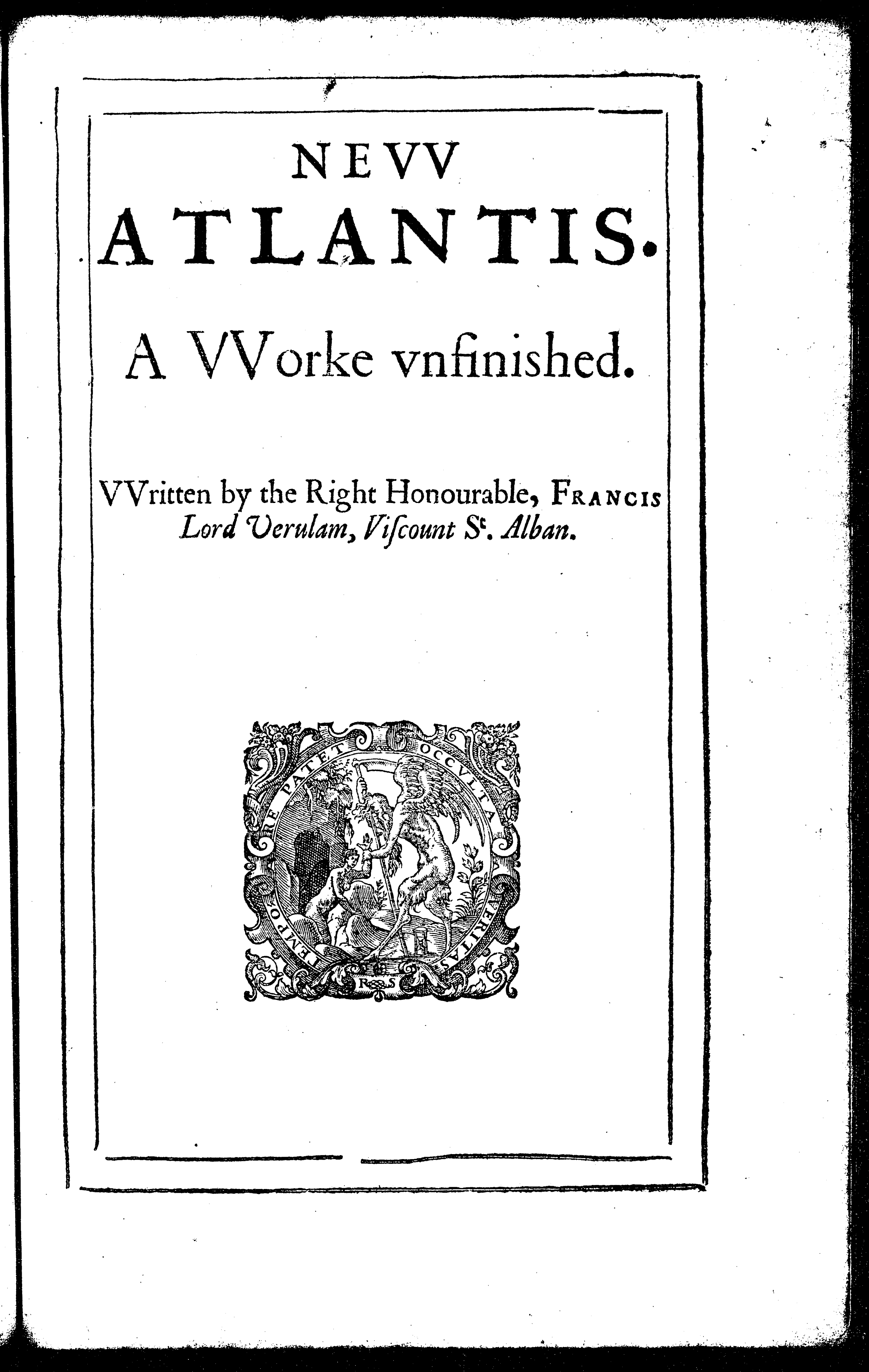
New Atlantis (1626) by Francis Bacon

Some scholars assert that science fiction had its beginnings in ancient times, when the distinction between myth and fact was blurred. Written in the 2nd century CE by the satirist Lucian, the novel A True Story contains many themes and tropes that are characteristic of modern science fiction, including travel to other worlds, extraterrestrial lifeforms, interplanetary warfare, and artificial life. Some consider it to be the first science fiction novel. Some stories from the folktale collection The Arabian Nights, along with the 10th-century fiction The Tale of the Bamboo Cutter and Ibn al-Nafis's 13th-century novel Theologus Autodidactus, are also argued to contain elements of science fiction.

Several books written during the Scientific Revolution and later the Age of Enlightenment are considered true works of science-fantasy. Francis Bacon's New Atlantis (1627), Johannes Kepler's Somnium (1634), Athanasius Kircher's Itinerarium exstaticum (1656), Cyrano de Bergerac's Comical History of the States and Empires of the Moon (1657) and The States and Empires of the Sun (1662), Margaret Cavendish's The Blazing World (1666), Jonathan Swift's Gulliver's Travels (1726), Ludvig Holberg's Nicolai Klimii Iter Subterraneum (1741) and Voltaire's Micromégas (1752).

Isaac Asimov and Carl Sagan considered Johannes Kepler's 1634 novel Somnium to be the first science fiction story; it depicts a journey to the Moon and how the Earth's motion is seen from there. Kepler has been called the "father of science fiction".

=== 19th century ===
Following the 17th-century development of the novel as a literary form, Mary Shelley's Frankenstein (1818) and The Last Man (1826) helped to define the form of the science fiction novel. Brian Aldiss has argued that Frankenstein was the first work of science fiction. Edgar Allan Poe wrote several stories considered to be science fiction, including "The Unparalleled Adventure of One Hans Pfaall" (1835) about a trip to the Moon.

Jules Verne was noted for his attention to detail and scientific accuracy, especially in the novel Twenty Thousand Leagues Under the Seas (1870). In 1887, the novel El anacronópete by Spanish author Enrique Gaspar y Rimbau introduced the first time machine. An early French/Belgian science fiction writer was J.-H. Rosny aîné (1856–1940). Rosny's masterpiece is Les Navigateurs de l'Infini (The Navigators of Infinity) (1925) in which the word astronaut (astronautique in French) was used for the first time.

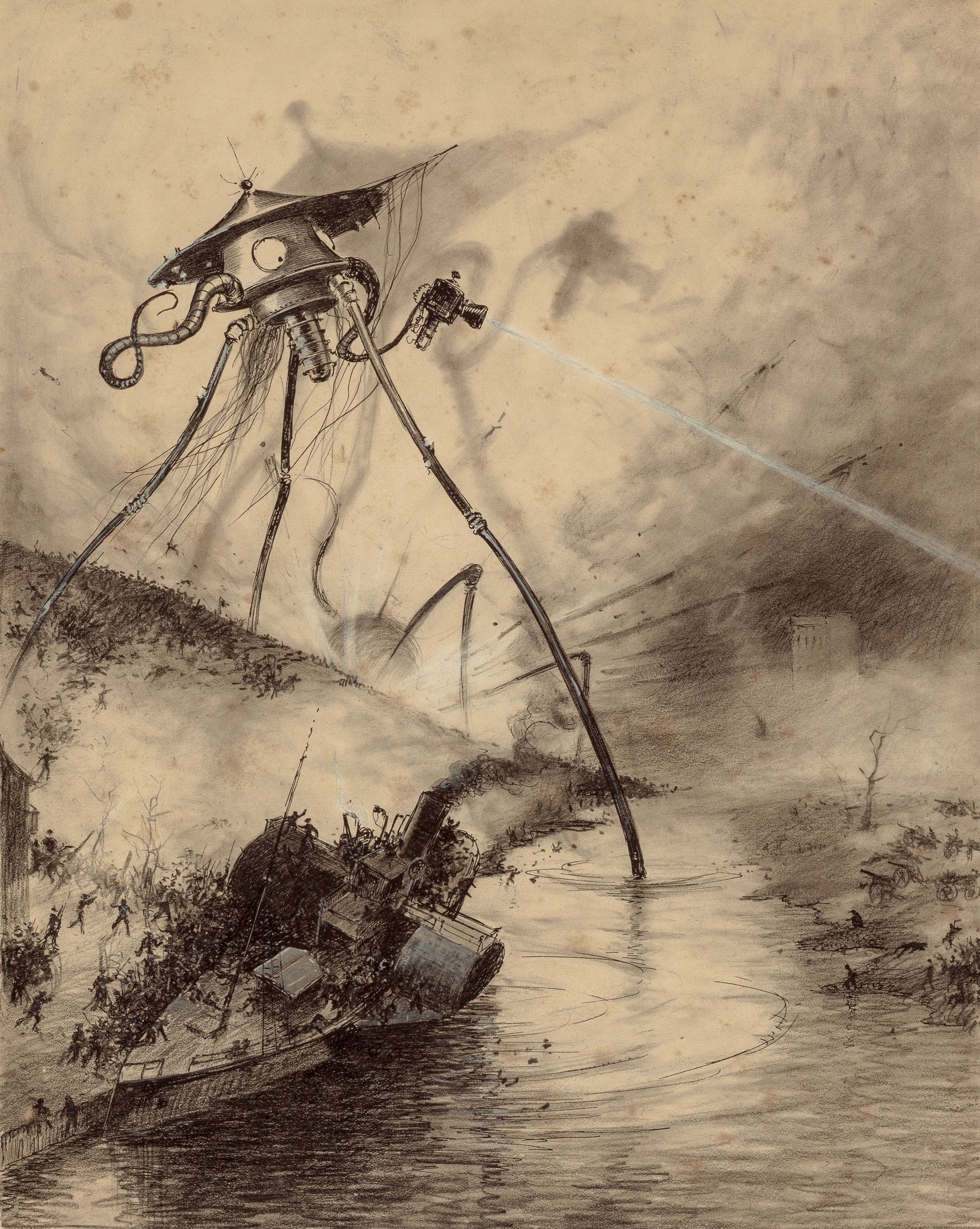
Alien invasion featured in the novel The War of the Worlds (1897) by H. G. Wells, illustrated by Henrique Alvim Corrêa in 1906

Many critics consider H. G. Wells to be one of science fiction's most important authors, or even "the Shakespeare of science fiction". His novels include The Time Machine (1895), The Island of Doctor Moreau (1896), The Invisible Man (1897), and The War of the Worlds (1898). His science fiction imagined alien invasion, biological engineering, invisibility, and time travel. In his non-fiction futurologist works, he predicted the advent of airplanes, military tanks, nuclear weapons, satellite television, space travel, and something like the World Wide Web.

=== 20th century ===
Edgar Rice Burroughs's novel A Princess of Mars, published in 1912, was the first of his thirty-year planetary romance series about the fictional Barsoom; the novels were set on Mars and featured John Carter as the hero.

One of the first dystopian novels, We, was written by the Russian author Yevgeny Zamyatin and published in 1924. It describes a world of harmony and conformity within a united totalitarian state.

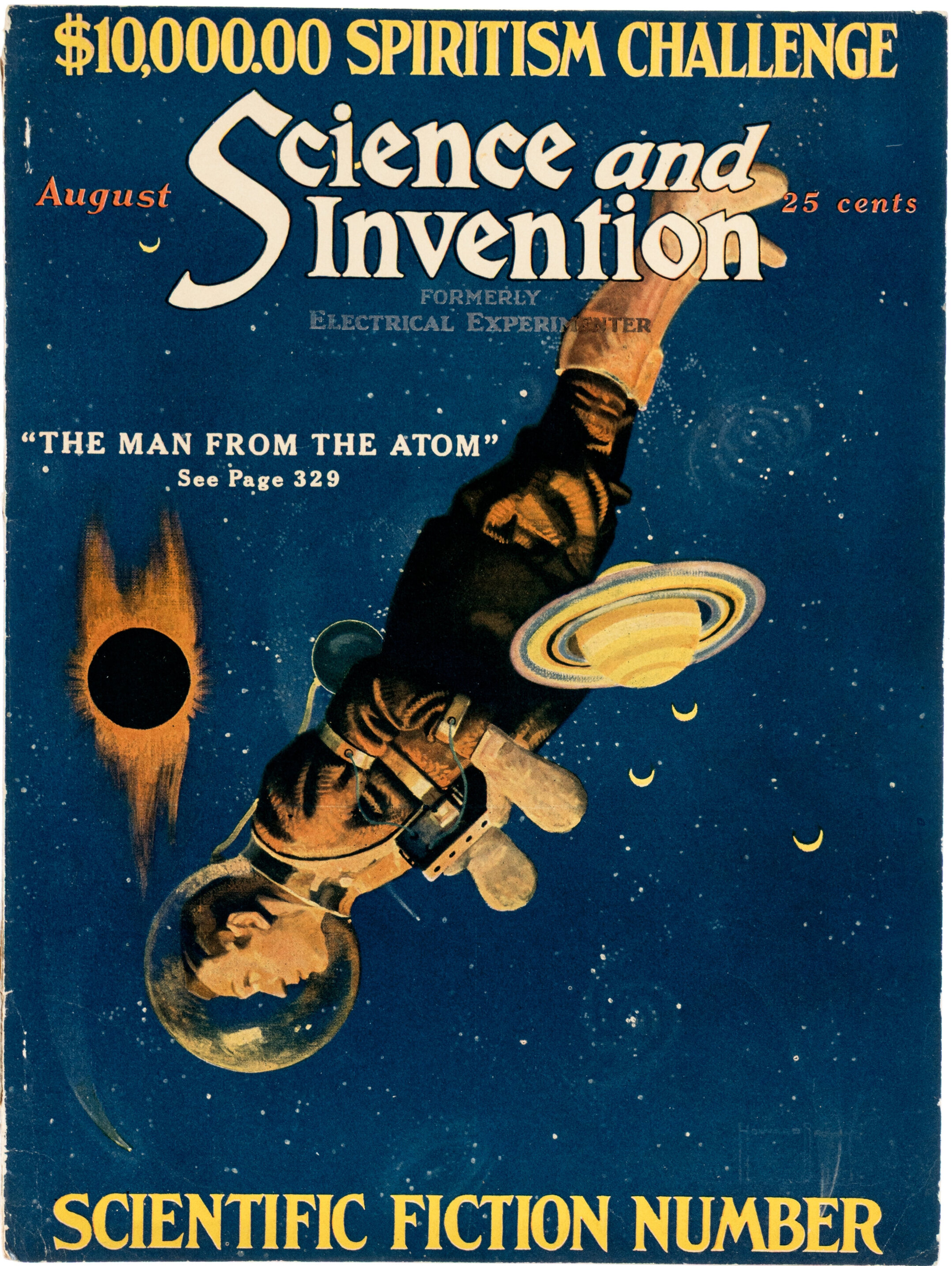
The August 1923 issue of Science and Invention — the "Scientific Fiction number" — was the first issue of a Gernsback-published magazine to have significant fiction content.

In 1926, Hugo Gernsback published the first American science fiction magazine, Amazing Stories. In its first issue, he said:

By 'scientifiction' I mean the Jules Verne, H. G. Wells and Edgar Allan Poe type of story—a charming romance intermingled with scientific fact and prophetic vision... Not only do these amazing tales make tremendously interesting reading—they are always instructive. They supply knowledge... in a very palatable form... New adventures pictured for us in the scientifiction of today are not at all impossible of realization tomorrow... Many great science stories destined to be of historical interest are still to be written... Posterity will point to them as having blazed a new trail, not only in literature and fiction, but progress as well.

In 1928, E. E. "Doc" Smith's first published novel, The Skylark of Space (co-authored with Lee Hawkins Garby), appeared in Amazing Stories. It is often described as the first great space opera. That same year, Philip Francis Nowlan's original story about Buck Rogers, Armageddon 2419, also appeared in Amazing Stories. This story was followed by a Buck Rogers comic strip, the first serious science fiction comic.

Last and First Men: A Story of the Near and Far Future is a future history novel written in 1930 by the British author Olaf Stapledon. A work of innovative scale in the science fiction genre, it describes the fictional history of humanity from the present forward across two billion years.

In 1937, John W. Campbell became the editor of Astounding Science Fiction magazine; this event is sometimes considered the beginning of the Golden Age of Science Fiction, which was characterized by stories celebrating scientific achievement and progress. The "Golden Age" is often said to have ended in 1946, but sometimes the late 1940s and the 1950s are included in this period.

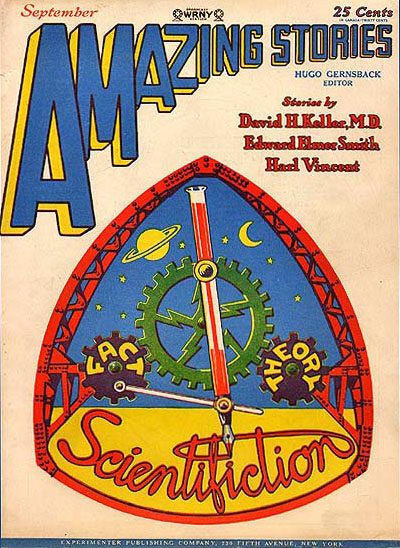
Amazing stories, Sept. 1928. Hugo Gernsback coined the term "Scientifiction" in 1916.

In 1942, Isaac Asimov began the Foundation series of novels, which chronicles the rise and fall of galactic empires, and also introduces the concept of psychohistory. The series was later awarded a one-time Hugo Award for "Best All-Time Series".

Theodore Sturgeon's novel More Than Human (1953) explored possible future human evolution. In 1957, the novel Andromeda: A Space-Age Tale by the Russian writer and paleontologist Ivan Yefremov presented a view of a future interstellar communist civilization; it is considered one of the most important Soviet science fiction novels.

In 1959, Robert A. Heinlein's novel Starship Troopers marked a departure from his earlier juvenile stories and novels. It is one of the first and most influential examples of military science fiction, and it introduced the concept of powered armor exoskeletons. The German space opera series Perry Rhodan, written by various authors, started in 1961 with an account of the first Moon landing; the series has since expanded in space to multiple universes and in time by billions of years. It has become the most popular book series in science fiction to date.

During the 1960s and 1970s, New Wave science fiction was known for embracing a high degree of experimentation (in both form and content), as well as a highbrow and self-consciously "literary" or "artistic" sensibility.

In 1961, Stanisław Lem's novel Solaris was published in Poland. The novel dealt with the theme of human limitations, as its characters attempted to study a seemingly intelligent ocean on a newly discovered planet. Lem's work anticipated the creation of microrobots and micromachinery, nanotechnology, smartdust, virtual reality, and artificial intelligence (including swarm intelligence); his work also developed the ideas of necroevolution and artificial worlds.

In 1965, the novel Dune by Frank Herbert imagined a more complex and detailed future society than had most previous science fiction.

In 1967, Anne McCaffrey began a science fantasy series called Dragonriders of Pern. Two novellas included in the series' first novel, Dragonflight, led McCaffrey to win the first Hugo or Nebula award given to a female author.

In 1968, Philip K. Dick's novel Do Androids Dream of Electric Sheep? was published. It is the literary source of the Blade Runner movie franchise. Published in 1969, the novel The Left Hand of Darkness by Ursula K. Le Guin is set on a planet where the inhabitants have no fixed gender. The novel is one of the most influential examples of social, feminist, or anthropological science fiction.

In 1979, Science Fiction World magazine began publication in the People's Republic of China. It dominates the Chinese science fiction magazine market, at one time claiming a circulation of 300,000 copies per issue and an estimated 3–5 readers per copy, giving it a total readership of at least 1 million people—making it the world's most popular science fiction periodical.

In 1984, William Gibson's first novel, Neuromancer, helped to popularize cyberpunk and the word cyberspace, a term he originally coined in the 1982 short story Burning Chrome. In the same year, Octavia Butler's short story "Speech Sounds" won the Hugo Award for Best Short Story. She went on to explore themes of racial injustice, global warming, women's rights, and political conflict. In 1995, she became the first science fiction author to receive a MacArthur Fellowship.

In 1986, the novel Shards of Honor by Lois McMaster Bujold began her Vorkosigan Saga science opera. 1992's novel Snow Crash by Neal Stephenson predicted immense social upheaval due to the information revolution.

=== 21st century ===
In 2007, Liu Cixin's novel The Three-Body Problem was published in China. It was translated into English by Ken Liu and published by Tor Books in 2014; it won the Hugo Award for Best Novel in 2015, making Liu the first Asian writer to win the award.

Emerging themes in late 20th- and early 21st-century science fiction include environmental issues, the implications of the Internet and the expanding information universe, questions about biotechnology, nanotechnology, and post-scarcity societies. Recent trends and subgenres include steampunk, biopunk, and mundane science fiction.

== Film ==
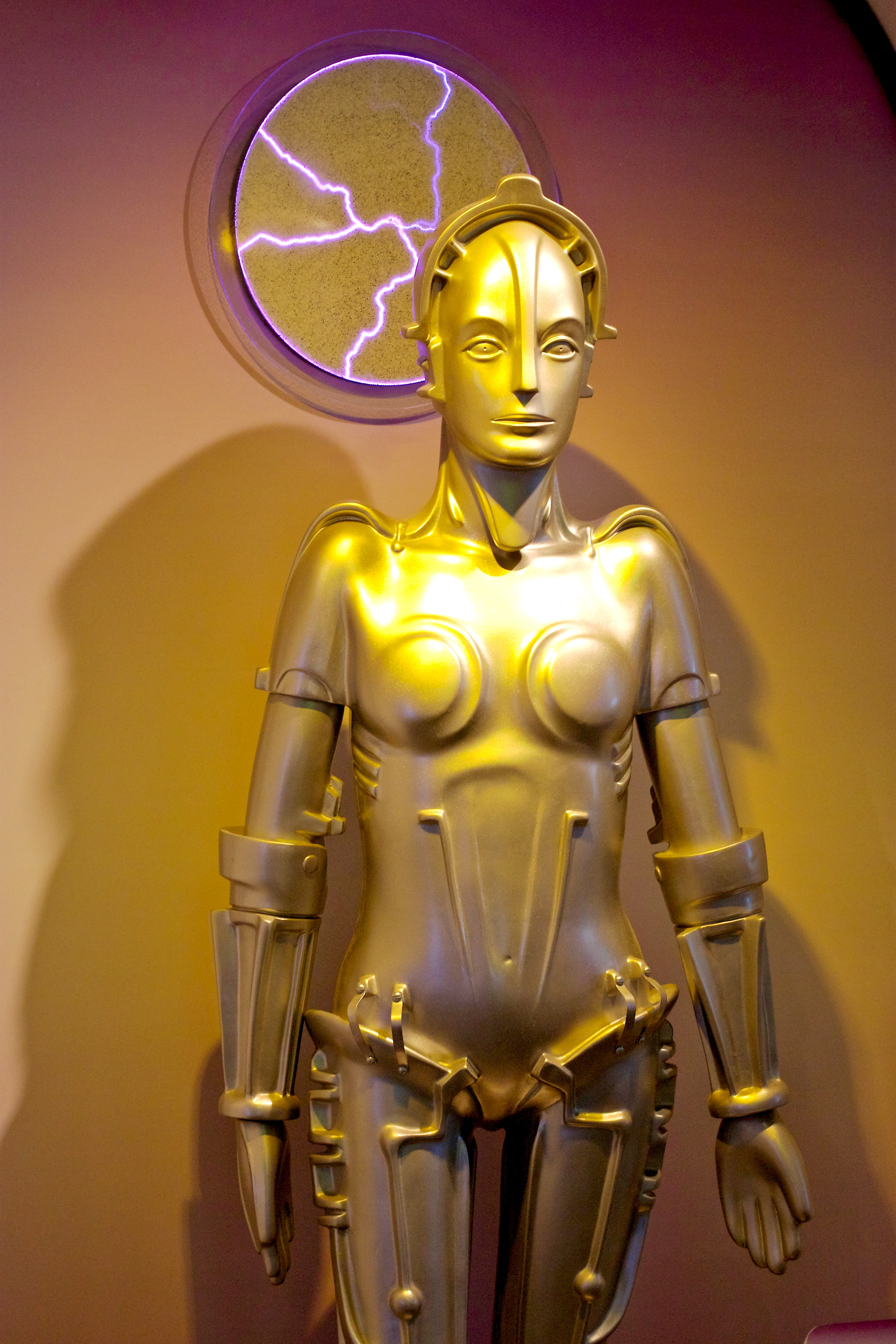
The Maschinenmensch (or machine-human) from Metropolis (1927)

One of the first recorded science fiction films is A Trip to the Moon from 1902, directed by French filmmaker Georges Méliès. It influenced later filmmakers, offering a different kind of creativity and fantasy. Méliès's innovative editing and special effects techniques were widely imitated, and they became important elements of the cinematic medium.

The 1927 film Metropolis, directed by Fritz Lang, is the first feature-length science fiction film. Though not well received in its time, it is now ranked as one of the best films ever made.

In 1954, Godzilla, directed by Ishirō Honda, started the kaiju subgenre of science fiction film; this subgenre features large creatures in any form, usually attacking a major city or engaging other monsters in battle.

The 1968 film 2001: A Space Odyssey, was directed by Stanley Kubrick and based on stories by Arthur C. Clarke. The film improved on the largely B-movie offerings to date in both scope and quality, and it influenced later science fiction films.

The original Planet of the Apes movie, directed by Franklin J. Schaffner and based on the 1963 French novel La Planète des Singes by Pierre Boulle, was also released in 1968. The film vividly depicts a post-apocalyptic world in which intelligent apes dominate humans. The film received both popular and critical acclaim.

In 1977, George Lucas began the Star Wars series with the eponymous 1977 film. The series, often called a space opera, became a worldwide popular culture phenomenon and the third-highest-grossing film series of all time.

Since the 1980s, science fiction films, along with fantasy, horror, and superhero films, have dominated Hollywood's big-budget productions. Science fiction films often cross-over with other genres. Some examples include film noir (Blade Runner, 1982), family (E.T. the Extra-Terrestrial, 1982), war (Enemy Mine, 1985, Starship Troopers (film), 1997), comedy (Spaceballs, 1987; Galaxy Quest, 1999), animation (WALL-E, 2008; Big Hero 6, 2014), Western (Serenity, 2005), action (Edge of Tomorrow, 2014; The Matrix, 1999), adventure (Jupiter Ascending, 2015; Interstellar, 2014), mystery (Minority Report, 2002), thriller (Ex Machina, 2014), drama (Melancholia, 2011; Predestination, 2014), and romance (Eternal Sunshine of the Spotless Mind, 2004; Her, 2013).

== Television ==
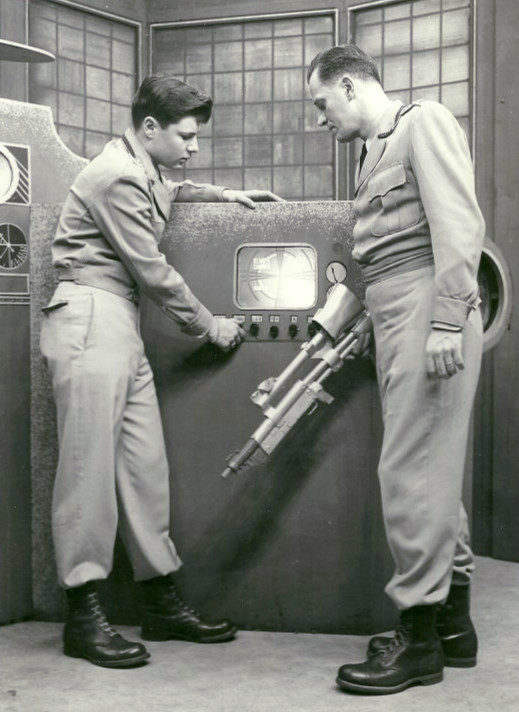
Don Hastings (left) and Al Hodge (right) in Captain Video and His Video Rangers

Science fiction and television have consistently had a close relationship. Television or similar technology often appeared in science fiction before television itself became widely available in the late 1940s and early 1950s.

The first known science fiction television program was a 35-minute adapted excerpt of the play RUR, written by the Czech playwright Karel Čapek, broadcast live from the BBC's Alexandra Palace studios on 11 February 1938. The first popular science fiction program on American television was the children's adventure serial Captain Video and His Video Rangers, which ran from June 1949 to April 1955.

The original The Twilight Zone series, produced and narrated by Rod Serling, ran from 1959 to 1964. (Serling also wrote or co-wrote most of the episodes.) The series featured fantasy, suspense, and horror as well as science fiction, with each episode being a complete story. Critics have ranked it as one of the best TV programs of any genre.

The animated series The Jetsons, while intended as comedy and only running for one season (1962–1963), predicted many inventions now in common use: flat-screen televisions, newspapers on a computer-like screen, computer viruses, video chat, tanning beds, home treadmills, and more.

In 1963, the series Doctor Who premiered on BBC Television with a time-travel theme. The original series ran until 1989 and was revived in 2005. It has been popular globally and has significantly influenced later science fiction TV.

Other British sci-fi dramas which are broadcast in the 1970s are UFO (1970–1971), The Tomorrow People (1973–1979), Space: 1999 (1975–1977) and Blake's 7 (1978–1981). Other notable programs during the 1960s included The Outer Limits (1963–1965), Lost in Space (1965–1968), and The Prisoner (1967–1968).

The original Star Trek series, created by Gene Roddenberry, premiered in 1966 on NBC Television and ran for three seasons. It combined elements of space opera and Space Western. Only mildly successful at first, the series gained popularity through syndication and strong fan interest. It became a popular and influential franchise with many films, television shows, novels, and other works and products. The series Star Trek: The Next Generation (1987–1994) led to six additional live action Star Trek shows: Deep Space Nine (1993–1999), Voyager (1995–2001), Enterprise (2001–2005), Discovery (2017–2024), Picard (2020–2023), and Strange New Worlds (2022–present); additional shows are in some stage of development.

The miniseries V premiered in 1983 on NBC. It depicted an attempted conquest of Earth by reptilian aliens. Red Dwarf, a comic science fiction series, aired on BBC Two between 1988 and 1999, and on Dave since 2009. The X-Files, which featured UFOs and conspiracy theories, was created by Chris Carter and broadcast by Fox Broadcasting Company from 1993 to 2002, and again from 2016 to 2018.

Stargate, a film about ancient astronauts and interstellar teleportation, was released in 1994. The series Stargate SG-1 premiered in 1997 and ran for 10 seasons (1997–2007). Spin-off series included Stargate Infinity (2002–2003), Stargate Atlantis (2004–2009), and Stargate Universe (2009–2011).

Other 1990s series included Quantum Leap (1989–1993) and Babylon 5 (1994–1999). The Syfy channel, launched in 1992 as The Sci-Fi Channel, specializes in science fiction, supernatural horror, and fantasy.

The space-Western series Firefly premiered in 2002 on Fox. It is set in the year 2517, after humans arrive in a new star system, and it follows the adventures of the renegade crew of Serenity, a "Firefly-class" spaceship. The series Orphan Black began a five-season run in 2013, focusing on a woman who takes on the identity of one of her genetically identical clones. In late 2015, Syfy premiered the series The Expanse to great critical acclaim—an American show about humanity's colonization of the Solar System. Its later seasons were aired through Amazon Prime Video.

== Social influence ==
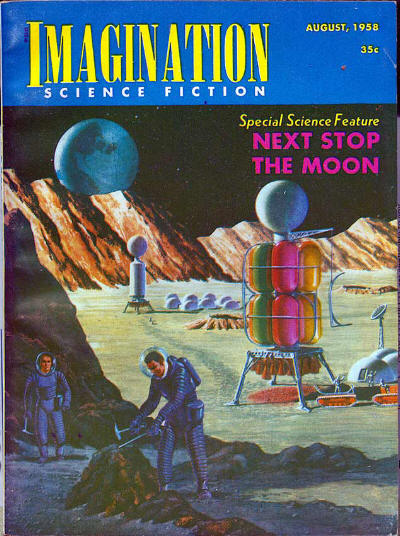
Space exploration was predicted in August 1958 by the science fiction magazine Imagination.

Science fiction's rapid increase in popularity during the first half of the 20th century was closely tied to public respect for science during that era, as well as the rapid pace of technological innovation and new inventions. Science fiction has often predicted scientific and technological progress. Some works imagine that this progress will tend to improve human life and society, for instance, the stories of Arthur C. Clarke and Star Trek. Other works, such as H.G. Wells's The Time Machine and Aldous Huxley's Brave New World, warn of possible negative consequences.

In 2001 the National Science Foundation conducted a survey of "Public Attitudes and Public Understanding: Science Fiction and Pseudoscience". The survey found that people who read or prefer science fiction may think about or relate to science differently than other people. Such people also tend to support the space program and efforts to contact extraterrestrial civilizations. Carl Sagan wrote that "Many scientists deeply involved in the exploration of the solar system (myself among them) were first turned in that direction by science fiction."

Science fiction has predicted several existing inventions, such as the atomic bomb, robots, and borazon. In the 2020 TV series Away, astronauts use a Mars rover called InSight to listen for a landing on Mars. In 2022, scientists actually used InSight to listen for the landing of a spacecraft.

Science fiction can act as a vehicle for analyzing and recognizing a society's past, present, and potential future social relationships with the other. It offers a medium for and a representation of alterity and differences in social identity. Brian Aldiss described science fiction as "cultural wallpaper".

This broad influence can be seen in the trend for writers to use science fiction as a tool for advocacy and generating cultural insights, as well as for educators who teach across a range of academic disciplines beyond the natural sciences. Scholar and science fiction critic George Edgar Slusser said that science fiction "is the one real international literary form we have today, and as such has branched out to visual media, interactive media and on to whatever new media the world will invent in the 21st century. Crossover issues between the sciences and the humanities are crucial for the century to come."

=== As protest literature ===
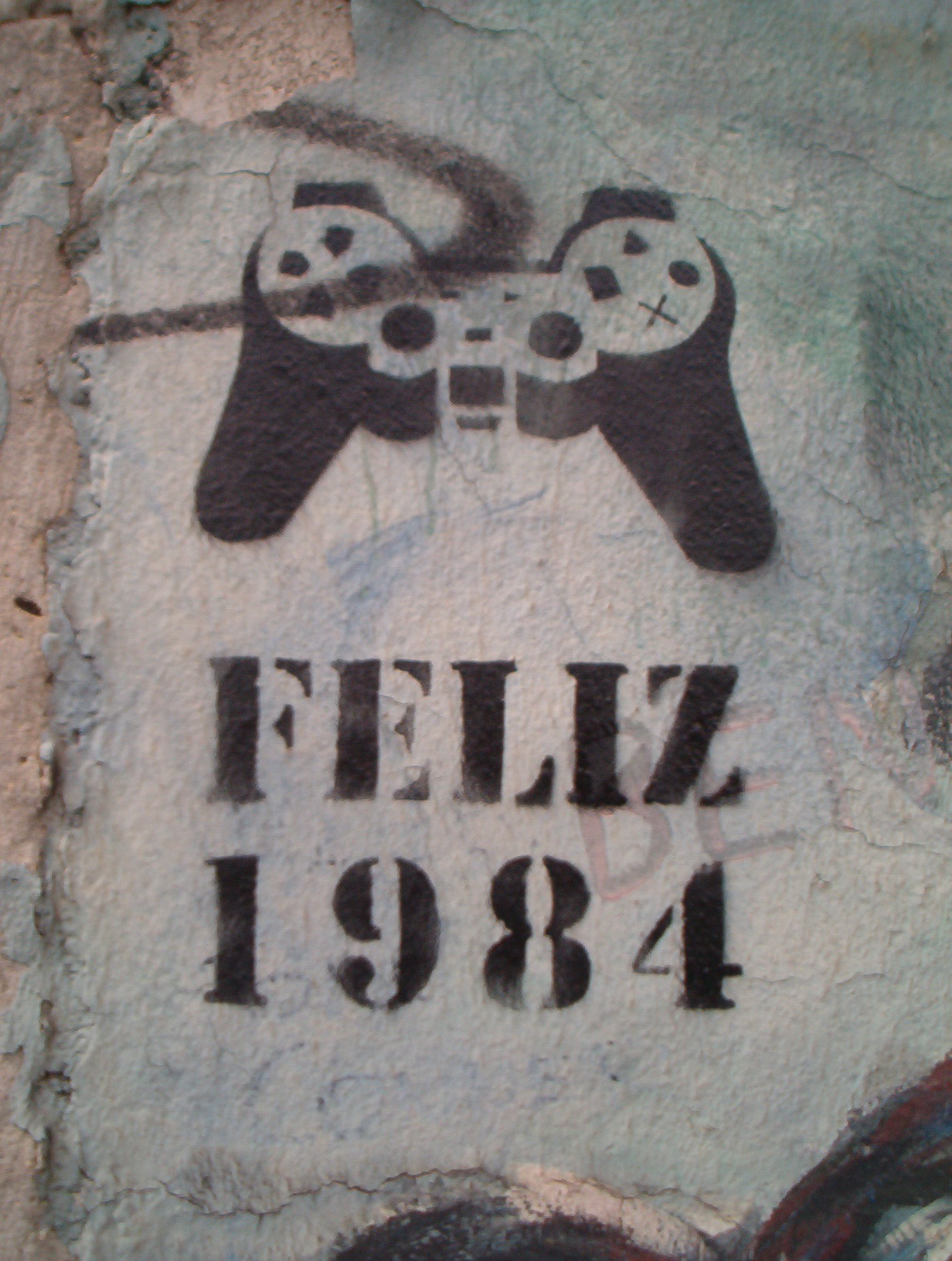
"Happy 1984" in Spanish or Portuguese, referencing George Orwell's novel Nineteen Eighty-Four, on a standing piece of the Berlin Wall (sometime after 1998)

Science fiction has sometimes been used as a means of social protest. George Orwell's novel Nineteen Eighty-Four (1949) is an important work of dystopian science fiction. The novel is often invoked in protests against governments and leaders who are seen as totalitarian. James Cameron's film Avatar (2009) was intended as a protest against imperialism, specifically the European colonization of the Americas. Science fiction in Latin America and Spain explores the concept of authoritarianism.

Robots, artificial humans, human clones, intelligent computers, and their possible conflicts with human society have all been major themes of science fiction since the publication of Shelly's novel Frankenstein (or earlier). Some critics have seen this tendency as reflecting authors' concerns over the social alienation seen in modern society.

Feminist science fiction poses questions about social issues such as how society constructs gender roles, the role reproduction plays in defining gender, and the inequitable political or personal power of one gender over others. Some works have illustrated these themes using utopias in which gender differences or gender power imbalances do not exist, or dystopias in which gender inequalities are intensified, thus asserting a need for feminist work to continue.

Climate fiction (or cli-fi) deals with issues of climate change and global warming. University courses on literature and environmental issues may include climate change fiction in their syllabi, and these issues are often discussed by other media beyond science fiction fandom.

Libertarian science fiction focuses on the politics and social order implied by right libertarian philosophies with an emphasis on individualism and private property, and in some cases anti-statism. Robert A. Heinlein is one of the most popular authors of this subgenre, including his novels The Moon is a Harsh Mistress and Stranger in a Strange Land.

Science fiction comedy often satirizes and criticizes present-day society, and it sometimes makes fun of the conventions and clichés of more serious science fiction.

=== Sense of wonder ===
1894 illustration by Aubrey Beardsley for Lucian's novel A True Story

Science fiction is often said to inspire a sense of wonder. Science fiction editor, publisher, and critic David Hartwell wrote that "Science fiction's appeal lies in combination of the rational, the believable, with the miraculous. It is an appeal to the sense of wonder."

Carl Sagan wrote about growing up with science fiction:

One of the great benefits of science fiction is that it can convey bits and pieces, hints, and phrases, of knowledge unknown or inaccessible to the reader . . . works you ponder over as the water is running out of the bathtub or as you walk through the woods in an early winter snowfall.

In 1967, Isaac Asimov commented on changes occurring in the science fiction community:

And because today's real life so resembles day-before-yesterday's fantasy, the old-time fans are restless. Deep within, whether they admit it or not, is a feeling of disappointment and even outrage that the outer world has invaded their private domain. They feel the loss of a 'sense of wonder' because what was once truly confined to 'wonder' has now become prosaic and mundane.

== Study ==
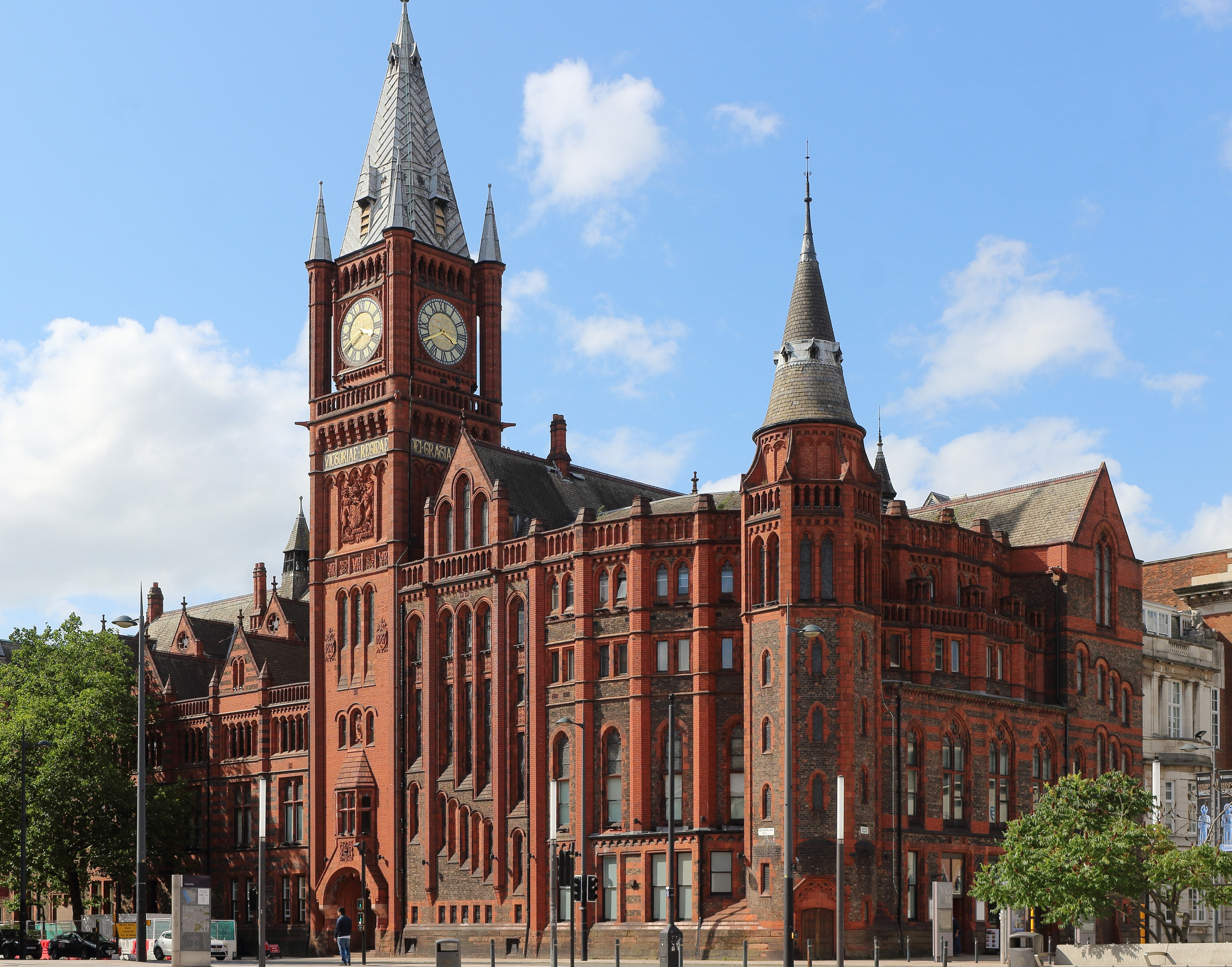
The centrepiece of the university estate, the Victoria Building, University of Liverpool, as a science fiction degree-granting program.

The field of science fiction studies involves the critical assessment, interpretation, and discussion of science fiction literature, film, TV shows, new media, fandom, and fan fiction. Science fiction scholars study the genre to better understand it and its relationship to science, technology, politics, other genres, and culture at large.

Science fiction studies began around the turn of the 20th century, but it was not until later that science fiction studies solidified as a discipline with the publication of the academic journals Extrapolation (1959), Foundation: The International Review of Science Fiction (1972), and Science Fiction Studies (1973), and the establishment of the oldest organizations devoted to the study of science fiction in 1970, the Science Fiction Research Association and the Science Fiction Foundation. The field has grown considerably since the 1970s with the establishment of more journals, organizations, and conferences, as well as science fiction degree-granting programs such as those offered by the University of Liverpool.

=== Classification ===
Science fiction has historically been subdivided into hard and soft categories, with the division centering on the feasibility of the science. However, this distinction has come under increased scrutiny in the 21st century. Some authors, such as Tade Thompson and Jeff VanderMeer, have observed that stories focusing explicitly on physics, astronomy, mathematics, and engineering tend to be considered hard science fiction, while stories focusing on botany, mycology, zoology, and the social sciences tend to be considered soft science fiction (regardless of the relative rigor of the science).

Max Gladstone defined hard science fiction as stories "where the math works", but he pointed out that this definition identifies stories that often seem "weirdly dated", as scientific paradigms shift over time. Michael Swanwick dismissed the traditional definition of hard science fiction altogether, instead stating that it was defined by characters striving to solve problems "in the right way–with determination, a touch of stoicism, and the consciousness that the universe is not on his or her side."

Ursula K. Le Guin also criticized the traditional contrast between hard and soft science fiction: "The 'hard' science fiction writers dismiss everything except, well, physics, astronomy, and maybe chemistry. Biology, sociology, anthropology—that's not science to them, that's soft stuff. They're not that interested in what human beings do, really. But I am. I draw on the social sciences a great deal."

=== Literary merit ===
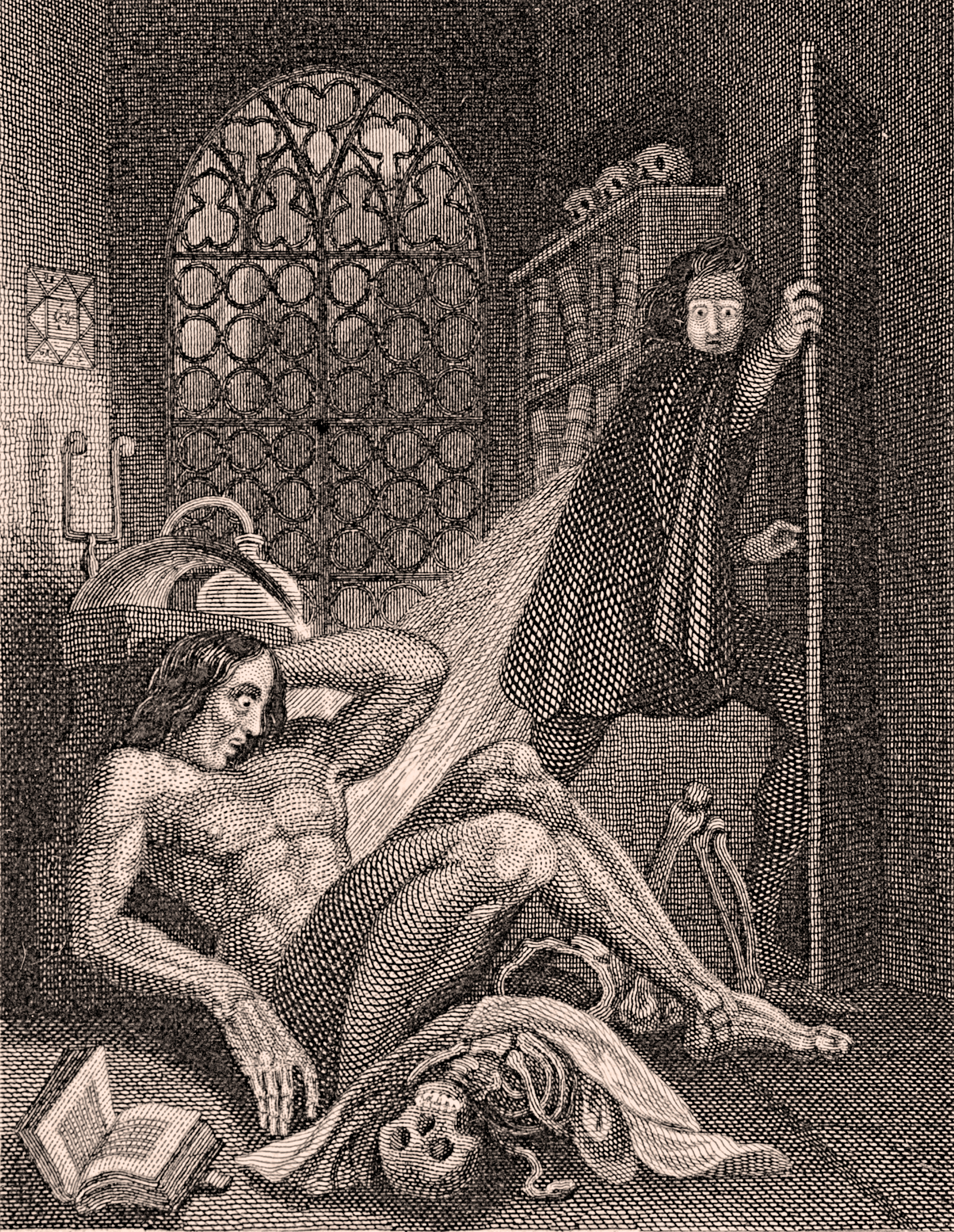
Illustration by Theodor von Holst for the 1831 edition of Mary Shelley's novel Frankenstein

Many critics remain skeptical of the literary value of science fiction and other forms of genre fiction, though some mainstream authors have written works claimed by opponents to be science fiction. Mary Shelley wrote a number of scientific romance novels in the Gothic literature tradition, including Frankenstein; or, The Modern Prometheus (1818). Kurt Vonnegut was a respected American author whose works have been argued by some to contain science fiction premises or themes.

Other science fiction authors whose works are widely considered to be "serious" literature include Ray Bradbury (especially Fahrenheit 451 and The Martian Chronicles), Arthur C. Clarke (especially Childhood's End), and Paul Myron Anthony Linebarger (using the pseudonym Cordwainer Smith). Doris Lessing, who was later awarded the Nobel Prize in Literature, wrote a series of five science fiction novels, Canopus in Argos: Archives (1979–1983); these novels depict the efforts of more advanced species and civilizations to influence less advanced ones, including humans on Earth.

David Barnett has indicated that some novels use recognizable science fiction tropes, but they are not classified by their authors and publishers as science fiction; such novels include The Road (2006) by Cormac McCarthy, Cloud Atlas (2004) by David Mitchell, The Gone-Away World (2008) by Nick Harkaway, The Stone Gods (2007) by Jeanette Winterson, and Oryx and Crake (2003) by Margaret Atwood. Atwood argued against categorizing works such as the Handmaid's Tale as science fiction; instead she labeled this novel, Oryx and Crake, and The Testaments as speculative fiction. She criticized science fiction as "talking squids in outer space."

In his book The Western Canon, literary critic Harold Bloom includes the novels Brave New World, Stanisław Lem's Solaris, Kurt Vonnegut's Cat's Cradle, and The Left Hand of Darkness as culturally and aesthetically significant works of Western literature, though Lem actively spurned the label science fiction.

In her 1976 essay "Science Fiction and Mrs Brown", Ursula K. Le Guin was asked, "Can a science fiction writer write a novel?" She answered that "I believe that all novels ... deal with character... The great novelists have brought us to see whatever they wish us to see through some character. Otherwise, they would not be novelists, but poets, historians, or pamphleteers."

Orson Scott Card is best known for his 1985 science fiction novel Ender's Game; he has postulated that in science fiction, the message and intellectual significance of the work are contained within the story itself—therefore the genre can omit accepted literary devices and techniques that he characterized as gimmicks or literary games.

In 1998, Jonathan Lethem wrote an essay titled "Close Encounters: The Squandered Promise of Science Fiction" in the Village Voice. In this essay, he recalled the time in 1973 when Thomas Pynchon's novel Gravity's Rainbow was nominated for the Nebula Award and was passed over in favor of Arthur C. Clarke's novel Rendezvous with Rama; Lethem suggests that this point stands as "a hidden tombstone marking the death of the hope that SF was about to merge with the mainstream." In the same year, science fiction author and physicist Gregory Benford wrote that "SF is perhaps the defining genre of the twentieth century, although its conquering armies are still camped outside the Rome of the literary citadels."

== Community ==
=== Authors ===
Science fiction has been written by authors from diverse cultural and geographical backgrounds. Among submissions to the science fiction publisher Tor Books, men account for 78% and women account for 22% (according to 2013 statistics from the publisher). A controversy about voting slates for the 2015 Hugo Awards highlighted a tension in the science fiction community between two things: a trend toward increasingly diverse works and authors being honored by awards, and a reaction by groups of authors and fans who preferred more "traditional" science fiction.

=== Awards ===
Among the most significant and well-known awards for science fiction are the Hugo Award for literature, presented by the World Science Fiction Society at Worldcon, and voted on by fans; the Nebula Award for literature, presented by the Science Fiction and Fantasy Writers of America, and voted on by the community of authors; the John W. Campbell Memorial Award for Best Science Fiction Novel, presented by a jury of writers; and the Theodore Sturgeon Memorial Award for short fiction, presented by a jury. One notable award for science fiction films and TV programs is the Saturn Award, which is presented annually by The Academy of Science Fiction, Fantasy, and Horror Films.

There are other national awards, like Canada's Prix Aurora Awards, regional awards, like the Endeavour Award presented at Orycon for works from the U.S. Pacific Northwest, and special interest or subgenre awards such as the Chesley Award for art, presented by the Association of Science Fiction & Fantasy Artists, or the World Fantasy Award for fantasy. Magazines may organize reader polls, notably the Locus Award.

=== Conventions ===
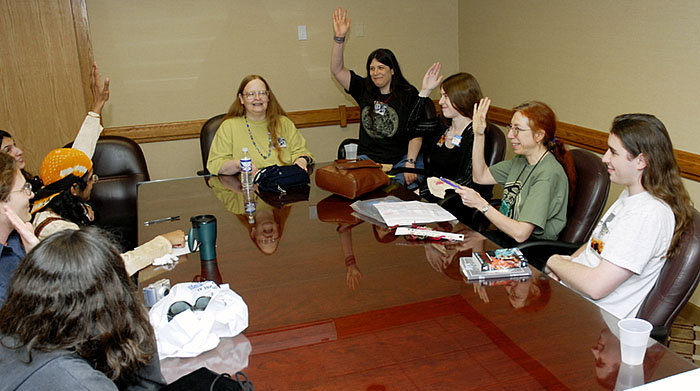
Writer Pamela Dean reading at the Minneapolis convention known as Minicon in 2006

Conventions (often abbreviated by fans as cons, such as Comic-con) are held in cities around the world; these cater to a local, regional, national, or international membership. General-interest conventions cover all aspects of science fiction, while others focus on a particular interest such as media fandom or filk music. Most science fiction conventions are organized by volunteers in non-profit groups, though most media-oriented events are organized by commercial promoters.

=== Fandom and fanzines ===
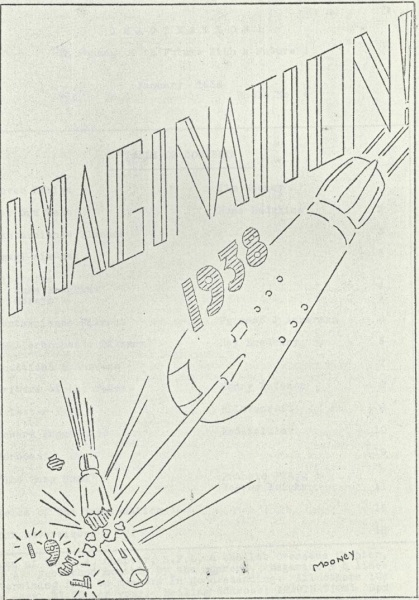
Cover of Imagination, a fanzine published by Forrest J. Ackerman, January 1938, drawn by Jim Mooney

Science fiction fandom emerged from the letters column in Amazing Stories magazine. Fans began writing letters to each other, and then assembling their comments in informal publications that became known as fanzines. Once in regular communication, these fans wanted to meet in person, so they organized local clubs. During the 1930s, the first science fiction conventions gathered fans from a larger area.

The earliest organized online fandom was the SF Lovers Community, originally a mailing list in the late 1970s, with a text archive file that was updated regularly. In the 1980s, Usenet groups greatly expanded the circle of fans online. In the 1990s, the development of the World-Wide Web increased online fandom through websites devoted to science fiction and related genres in all media.

The first science fiction fanzine, The Comet, was published in 1930 by the Science Correspondence Club in Chicago, Illinois. As of 2025, one of the best known fanzines is Ansible, edited by David Langford, winner of numerous Hugo awards. Other notable fanzines to win one or more Hugo awards include File 770, Mimosa, and Plokta. Artists working for fanzines have often risen to prominence in the field, including Brad W. Foster, Teddy Harvia, and Joe Mayhew; the Hugo Awards include a category for Best Fan Artists.

== Elements ==
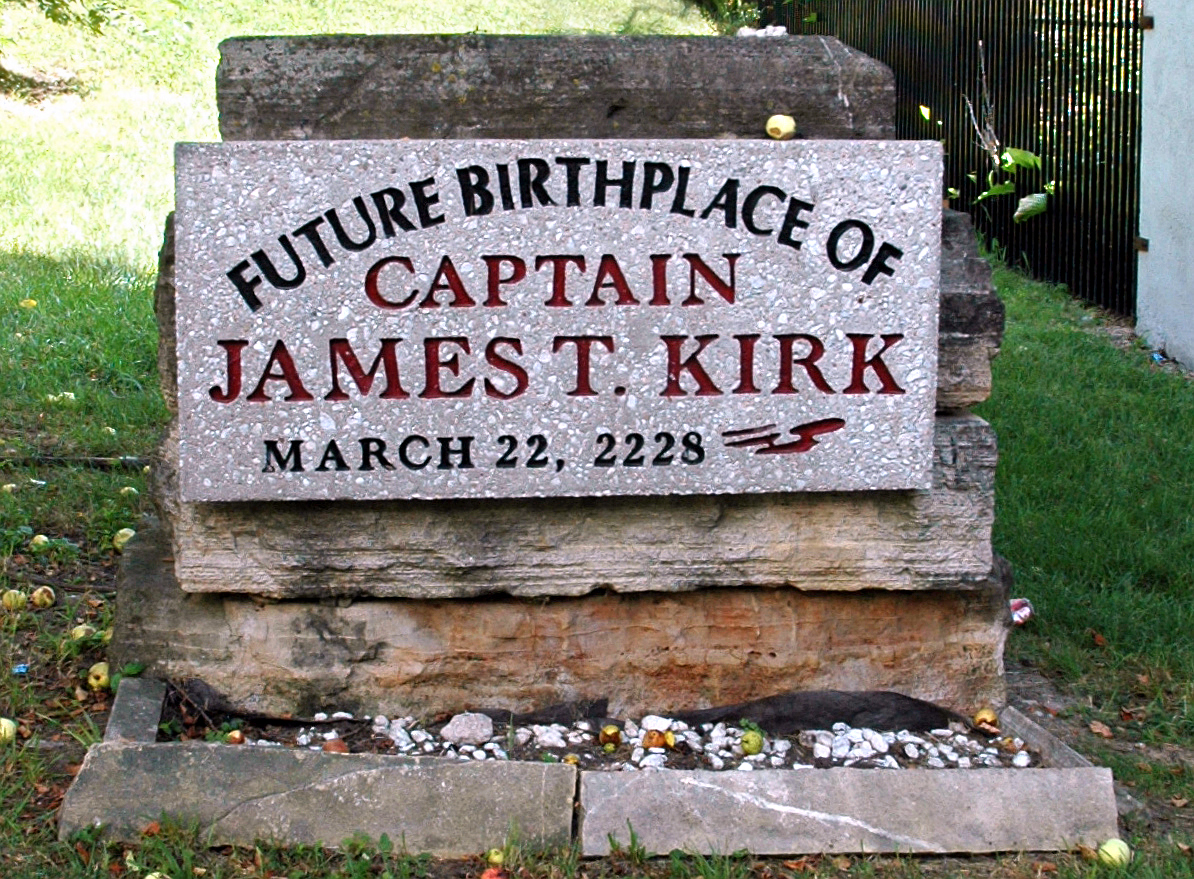
Plaque in Riverside, Iowa, to honor the "future birth" of Star Trek's character James T. Kirk

Science fiction elements can include the following:

- Temporal settings in the future or in alternative histories;
- Predicted or speculative technology such as brain–computer interface, bio-engineering, superintelligent computers, robots, ray guns, and advanced weapons;
- Space travel, or settings in outer space, on other worlds, in subterranean earth, or in parallel universes;
- Fictional concepts in biology such as aliens, mutants, and enhanced humans;
- Undiscovered scientific possibilities such as teleportation, time travel, and faster-than-light travel or communication;
- Social/political systems and situations that are new and different, including utopian, dystopian, post-apocalyptic, or post-scarcity;
- Future history and speculative evolution of humans on Earth or other planets;
- Paranormal abilities such as mind control, telepathy, and telekinesis.
- Religious fanaticism is heavily intertwined with science fiction through its use of ritual and extremism to interpret or misinterpret the world. The science fiction questions cultural norms, trends, and social movements. Religion and religious fanaticism critique the world in the same way as science fiction, while the stories display a disconnect between the extreme actions of a fanatic and the typical protagonist, who often combats this element.

== International examples ==
- Africanfuturism
- Australian science fiction
- Bengali science fiction
- Brazilian science fiction
- Canadian science fiction
- Chinese science fiction
- Croatian science fiction
- Czech science fiction and fantasy
- French science fiction
- Japanese science fiction
- Korean science fiction
- Norwegian science fiction
- Science fiction in Poland
- Romanian science fiction
- Russian science fiction and fantasy
- Serbian science fiction
- Spanish science fiction
- Yugoslav science fiction

== Subgenres ==
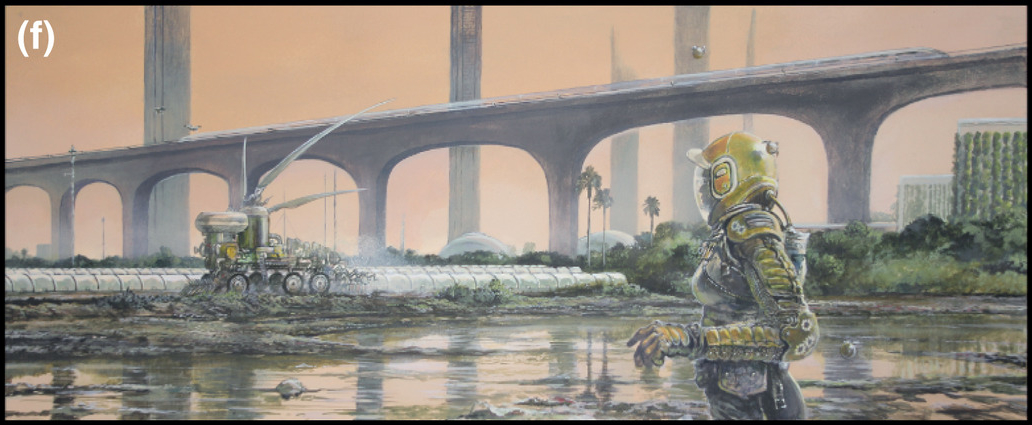
A climate fiction depiction of agriculture in India in 2500, with workers wearing protective suits to protect from extreme temperatures and unmanned surface vehicle tractors.

While science fiction is a genre of fiction, a science fiction genre is a subgenre within science fiction. Science fiction may be divided along any number of overlapping axes. Gary K. Wolfe's Critical Terms for Science Fiction and Fantasy identifies over 30 subdivisions of science fiction, not including science fantasy (which is a mixed genre).

- Afrofuturism
- Anthropological science fiction
- Apocalyptic and post-apocalyptic fiction
- Biopunk
- Black science fiction
- Christian science fiction
- Climate fiction
- Comic science fiction
- Cyberpunk
- Dieselpunk
- Dying Earth
- Far future in fiction
- Feminist science fiction
- Gothic science fiction
- Indigenous Futurism
- Libertarian science fiction
- Military science fiction
- Mundane science fiction
- Pastoral science fiction
- Planetary romance
- Social science fiction
- Solarpunk
- Space opera
- Space Western
- Steampunk

== Related genres ==
- Alternate history
- Fantasy
- Historical fiction
- Horror fiction
- Mystery fiction
- Science fantasy
- Space horror
- Spy fiction
- Spy-fi
- Superhero fiction
- Supernatural fiction
- Utopian and dystopian fiction

== See also ==
- Outline of science fiction
- History of science fiction
- Timeline of science fiction
- The Encyclopedia of Science Fiction
- Extrasolar planets in fiction
- Fantastic art
- Fictional worlds
- Futures studies
- Hard science fiction
- List of fictional robots and androids
- List of science fiction comedy works
- List of science fiction and fantasy artists
- List of science fiction authors
- List of science fiction films
- List of science fiction literature with Messiah figures
- List of science fiction novels
- List of science fiction television programs
- List of science fiction tropes
- List of science fiction universes
- Retrofuturism
- Science fiction comics
- Science fiction libraries and museums
- Science in science fiction
- Soft science fiction
- Time travel in fiction
- Transhumanism

== General and cited sources ==
- Aldiss, Brian. Billion Year Spree: The True History of Science Fiction, 1973.
- Aldiss, Brian, and Wingrove, David. Trillion Year Spree: The History of Science Fiction, revised and updated edition, 1986.
- Amis, Kingsley. New Maps of Hell: A Survey of Science Fiction, 1958.
- Barron, Neil, ed. Anatomy of Wonder: A Critical Guide to Science Fiction (5th ed.). Westport, Conn.: Libraries Unlimited, 2004. ISBN 1-59158-171-0.
- Broderick, Damien. Reading by Starlight: Postmodern Science Fiction. London: Routledge, 1995. Print.
- Clute, John Science Fiction: The Illustrated Encyclopedia. London: Dorling Kindersley, 1995. ISBN 0-7513-0202-3.
- Clute, John and Peter Nicholls, eds., The Encyclopedia of Science Fiction. St Albans, Herts, UK: Granada Publishing, 1979. ISBN 0-586-05380-8.
- Clute, John and Peter Nicholls, eds., The Encyclopedia of Science Fiction. New York: St Martin's Press, 1995. ISBN 0-312-13486-X.
- Disch, Thomas M. The Dreams Our Stuff Is Made Of. New York: The Free Press, 1998. ISBN 978-0-684-82405-5.
- Jameson, Fredric. Archaeologies of the Future: This Desire Called Utopia and Other Science Fictions. London and New York: Verso, 2005.
- Milner, Andrew. Locating Science Fiction. Liverpool: Liverpool University Press, 2012.
- Raja, Masood Ashraf, Jason W. Ellis and Swaralipi Nandi. eds., The Postnational Fantasy: Essays on Postcolonialism, Cosmopolitics and Science Fiction. McFarland 2011. ISBN 978-0-7864-6141-7.
- Reginald, Robert. Science Fiction and Fantasy Literature, 1975–1991. Detroit, MI/Washington, D.C./London: Gale Research, 1992. ISBN 0-8103-1825-3.
- Roy, Pinaki. "Science Fiction: Some Reflections". Shodh Sanchar Bulletin, 10.39 (July–September 2020): 138–42.
- Scholes, Robert E.; Rabkin, Eric S. (1977). Science fiction: history, science, vision. Oxford University Press. ISBN 978-0-19-502174-5.
- Suvin, Darko. Metamorphoses of Science Fiction: on the Poetics and History of a Literary Genre, New Haven : Yale University Press, 1979.
- Weldes, Jutta, ed. To Seek Out New Worlds: Exploring Links between Science Fiction and World Politics. New York: Palgrave Macmillan, 2003. ISBN 0-312-29557-X.
- Westfahl, Gary, ed. The Greenwood Encyclopedia of Science Fiction and Fantasy: Themes, Works, and Wonders (three volumes). Westport, Conn.: Greenwood Press, 2005.
- Wolfe, Gary K. Critical Terms for Science Fiction and Fantasy: A Glossary and Guide to Scholarship. New York: Greenwood Press, 1986. ISBN 0-313-22981-3.
