= David Roberts (academic) =

Australian professor of German studies (born 1937)

David Gordon John Roberts (born 2 December 1937) is an Australian professor of German studies. He was awarded a Ph.D. at Monash University in 1968, supervised by Leslie Bodi. His main areas of research are modern German literature, socio-aesthetics of literature and the arts, and the aesthetic theory and cultural history of European modernism.

== Awards ==
- Fellowship, Alexander von Humboldt Foundation 1969, 1981, 1997
- Fellow of the Australian Academy of the Humanities 1986–
- Centennial Medal for Service to German Studies in Australia 2001

== Editorial activities ==
- Co-editor Thesis Eleven. Critical Theory and Historical Sociology 1983-
- International Advisory Board, Germanistik 1987-
- International Editorial Board, The German Quarterly 1988-1994
- Co-editor, “Monash European Studies”, Berg Publishers, Oxford/New York/Hamburg, 1988–1993
- International Advisory Board, “Studies in Contemporary German Literature”, Stauffenburg, Tübingen, 1997–2002
- Advisory Board, Limbus. Australian Yearbook of German Literary and Cultural Studies

== Publications ==
- Artistic Consciousness and Political Conscience: The Novels of Heinrich Mann 1900-1938. Bern, Lang, 1971 (Australian and New Zealand Studies in German Language and Literature 2)
- Kopf und Welt: Elias Canettis Roman “Die Blendung”. München, Hanser Verlag, 1975 (“Literatur als Kunst”, ed. Walter Höllerer)
- The Indirections of Desire. Hamlet in Goethes Wilhelm Meister. Heidelberg, Carl Winter Verlag, 1980 (“Reihe Siegen”, ed. Helmut Kreuzer & Karl Riha
- Art and Enlightenment: Aesthetic Theory after Adorno. Lincoln, London, University of Nebraska Press, 1991 (Modern German Culture and Literature, ed. Peter Uwe Hohendahl) . Reissued as paperback 2005
  - See review article: Max Pensky, “Choosing Your Mask”, New German Critique 63 (1994), 161-180
- Dialectic of Romanticism. A Critique of Modernism. With Peter Murphy, London: Continuum, 2004
- Canetti's Counter-Image of Society. Crowds, Power, Transformation. With Johann P. Arnason, 'Rochester, N.Y., Camden House, 2004.
- The Total Work of Art in European Modernism. Ithaca, NY: Cornell University Press, 2011 (Signale: Modern German Letters, Cultures, and Thought ed. Peter Hohendahl) See review article: Roger Fornoff, ‘At the Interface of Art, Religion, Politics‘, Thesis Eleven 123 (2014), 123–128.
- History of the Present: The Contemporary and its Culture. London, Routledge, 2021.
- Science Fiction and Narrative Form. With Andrew Milner and Peter Murphy, London, Bloomsbury, 2023.
