= Locating Science Fiction =

2012 book by Andrew Milner

- Author: Andrew Milner
- Subject: Science fiction
- Publisher: Liverpool University Press
- Publication date: 2012
- Pages: 244
- ISBN: 9781846318429

Locating Science Fiction is a 2012 book on science fiction literary criticism by Andrew Milner.

== Bibliography ==
- Hills, Matt (2014). "Book review: Locating Science Fiction". Cultural Sociology. 8 (3): 367–369. doi:10.1177/1749975514545584a. ISSN 1749-9755.
- José, Alaniz (2014). "Andrew Milner. Locating Science Fiction; and Anindita Banerjee. We Modern People: Science Fiction and the Making of Russian Modernity". Comparative Literature Studies. 51 (4): 674–678. doi:10.5325/complitstudies.51.4.0674. ISSN 0010-4132.
- Rieder, John (2013). "Breaking with Suvinian Formalism". Science Fiction Studies. 40 (3): 564–568. doi:10.5621/sciefictstud.40.3.0564. ISSN 0091-7729.
- Rigby, Kate (2014). "Review of Locating Science Fiction". Australasian Journal of Ecocriticism and Cultural Ecology. 4: 150–152. ISSN 1839-843X.
- Roberts, David (2015). "Book review: Locating Science Fiction". Thesis Eleven. 127 (1): 158–164. doi:10.1177/0725513615576157. ISSN 0725-5136.
- Seed, David (2013). "Review of Locating Science Fiction. Liverpool Science Fiction Texts and Studies 44". Key Words: A Journal of Cultural Materialism (11): 135–137. ISSN 1369-9725. JSTOR 26920352.
