= The Wish (painting) =

Painting by Theodor von Holst

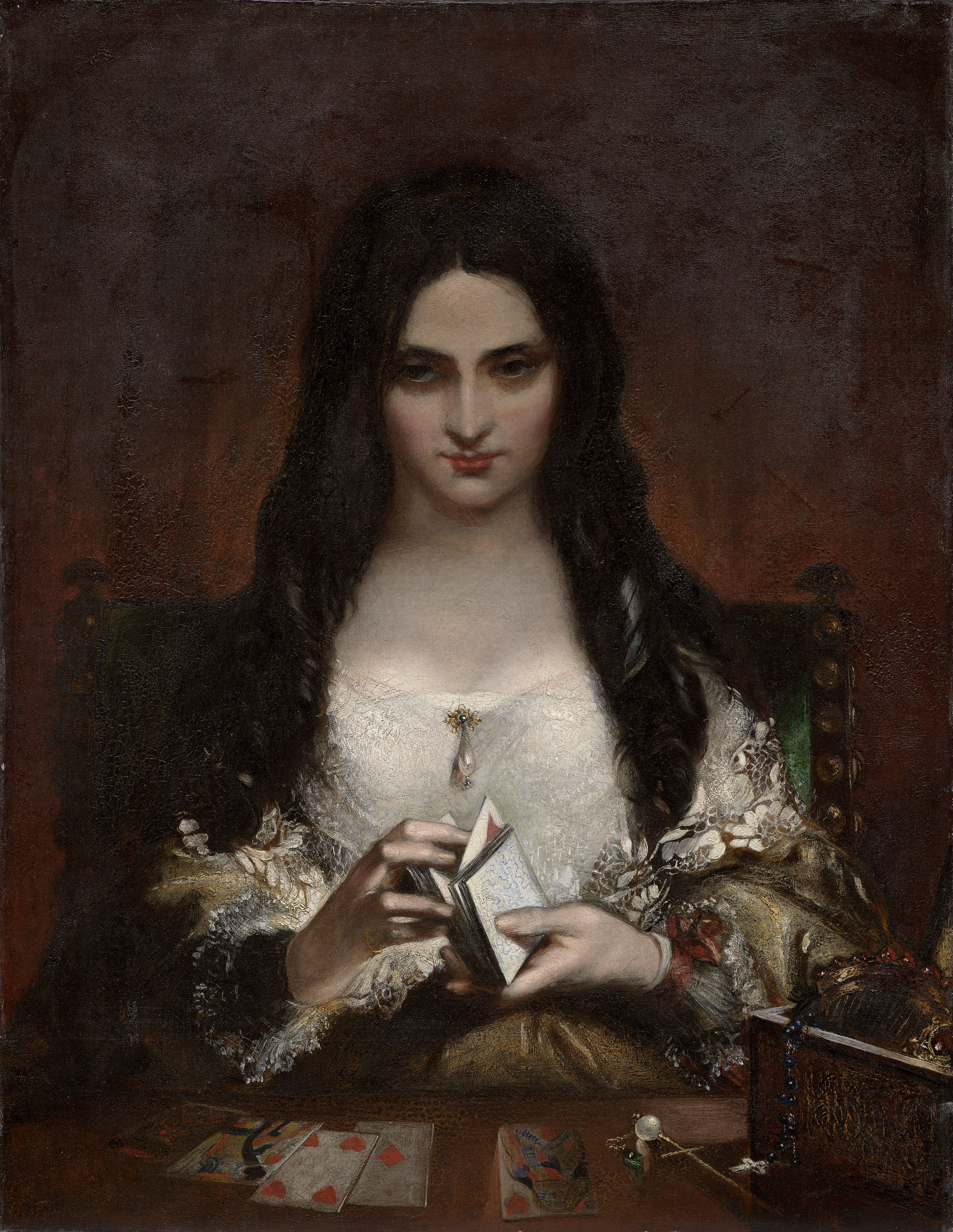
- Artist: Theodor von Holst
- Year: 1840
- Type: Oil on canvas, genre painting
- Dimensions: 116.8 cm × 96.5 cm (46.0 in × 38.0 in)
- Location: Yale Center for British Art, New Haven

The Wish is an 1840 oil painting by the British artist Theodor von Holst. It depicts a fashionably-dressed woman seated at a table holding a pack of playing cards. The artist was London-born of Baltic German heritage and his talents had been noticed at a young age and encouraged by Henry Fuseli as well as Thomas Lawrence. His career was cut short by his death at the age of 34 in 1844.

The painting was displayed at the British Institution's annual exhibition held at Pall Mall in 1841, where it was acquired by Lord Northwick. The Pre-Raphaelite artist Dante Gabriel Rossetti encountered it at Northwick's Gloucestershire estate at Thirlestaine House and produced a poem The Card-Dealer based on it, envisioning her as a femme fatale.

Today the painting is in the collection of the Yale Center for British Art in Connecticut, having been acquired in 2016.

== Bibliography ==
- Browne Max. The Romantic Art of Theodor Von Holst, 1810-44. Lund Humphries, 1994.
