= Leslie Bodi =

Literary historian

- Born: Lázló Bodi; September 1, 1922; Budapest, Hungary
- Died: September 15, 2015 (aged 93); Melbourne, Australia
- Occupation: Academic

Academic work
- Discipline: German studies
- Notable students: Michael Clyne; David Roberts
- Notable works: Tauwetter in Wien: zur Prosa der österreichischen Aufklärung 1781-1795; Image of a Continent: A Bibliography of German Australiana from the Beginnings to 1975

Leslie Bodi (1922–2015) was the foundation Professor of German and long-term head of the department (1963–1987) at Monash University.

== Early life and education ==
Bodi was born László Bodi in Budapest, Hungary on 1 September 1922. His parents were István Bruchsteiner, a publisher, and Klara (née Pongrácz).

He attended school in Hungary and Italy. After working as a graphics instructor and offset machine operator in 1940-43, he spent 18 months in a forced labour camp (1943–45). At the end of the Second World War, he studied German and English at the university level in Budapest and Vienna (1945–49), graduating with Budapest Staatsexamen qualifications in 1949 and with a Ph.D. from the University of Budapest. From 1946 he also worked as a tutor and assistant in German at the University of Budapest.

Following the Hungarian Revolution of 1956, he migrated to Australia with his wife and daughter.

== Academic career in Australia ==
Bodi taught German and history at the Melbourne Grammar School for two years (1957–58) and then was a lecturer at the University College, Newcastle, New South Wales.

In 1961 he returned to Melbourne to take up an appointment as Senior Lecturer at Monash University. In 1963 he was appointed as the Foundation Professor of German at the same university, a position he would hold until his retirement in 1987.

During those years as professor he would also occupy several research positions, mainly in Vienna, but also at Berlin, Budapest, Frankfurt am Main, Paris and Siegen. He was also visiting professor at universities in Vienna, Graz and Berlin.

== Legacy ==
Appointed in 1963 to set up the new German studies department at Monash University, Bodi implemented a broad curriculum that included not only the traditional study of German language and literature but also the "political, social and cultural history of the German-speaking lands". He actively and rapidly recruited new young staff, many of whom, including the linguist Michael Clyne and the Germanist David Roberts, went on to complete "doctorates under his supervision". He used Monash University's new budget to build up an "outstanding collection" of books and other resources in the university library.

He emphasised that German culture and studied were "pluricentric" and so he taught not only Germany but also Austria whose literature and language he viewed as "autonomous". He also promoted the study of the literature and culture of the German Democratic Republic and more generally of "emerging European writers and movements".

Bodi's own academic research included pioneering work on German-Australian connections, including on the naturalist and ethnologist Georg Forster, who went on James Cook's second voyage to the Pacific, and on the Enlightenment in Austria, writing a book Tauwetter in Wien (Thaw in Vienna) which has become a standard work. He produced bibliographies on German Australiana and German culture held in Melbourne libraries.

== Personal life ==
Leslie Bodi married Marianna "Marianne" Marton in 1950. They had one daughter, Anna.

He died on 4 September 2015.

== Awards ==
- 1973: Verdienstkreuz 1. Klasse des Verdienstorders der Bundesrepublik Deutschland Order of Merit of the Federal Republic of Germany
- 1976: Österreichisches Ehrenkreuz für Wissenschaft und Kunst 1, Klasse (Austrian Decoration for Science and Art)
- 1989: Friedrich-Gundolf-Preis
- 1991: Goethe-Medaille des Goethe-Instituts Munchen (Goethe Medal)
- 1997: Humboldt Research Award

== Select bibliography ==
=== Books: As author ===
- Heinrich Heine (Budapest: Közoktatásügyi kiadóvállalat, 1951)
- German Culture in the Libraries of Melbourne: the State Library of Victoria; Baillieu Library, University of Melbourne; German Dept. Library, University of Melbourne; Monash University Library (joint author: Susan Radvansky) (Melbourne: German Section, Department of Modern Languages, Monash University, 1967)
- Tauwetter in Wien: zur Prosa der österreichischen Aufklärung 1781–1795 (Frankfurt am Main: S. Fischer, 1977)
- Image of a Continent: A Bibliography of German Australiana from the Beginnings to 1975 = Bild eines Kontinents : eine Bibliographie deutscher Australiana von den Anfängen bis 1975 (Wiesbaden: O. Harrassowitz, c.1990)
- Literatur, Politik, Identität = Literature, Politics, Cultural Identity (St. Ingbert: Röhrig, 2002)

=== Books: As editor ===
- Effi Briest by Theodor Fontane (Budapest: Szèpirodalmi Könyvkiado, 1954)
- Adventures on a Journey to New Holland and The Lonely Deathbed, by Therese Huber. Translated from the German original Abentheuer auf einer Reise nach Neu-Holland (1793) by Rodney Livingstone. Edited, with preface and notes, by Leslie Bodi. Melbourne: Lansdowne Press, 1966.
- Das Problem Österreich: Arbeitspapiere : Interdisziplinäre Konferenz über Geschichte, Kultur und GesellschaftÖsterreichs im 20. Jahrhundert, Germanistisches Institut, Monash Universität 16–18 Mai, 1980 = The Austrian Problem: Working papers: Interdisciplinary Conference on 20th Century Austrian History, Culture and Society, Department of German, Monash University, May 16–18, 1980 (co-edited with Philip Thomson) (Clayton, Victoria: Monash University, Department of German, 1982)
- The German Connection: Sesquicentenary Essays on German-Victorian Crosscurrents, 1835–1985 (co-edited with Stephen Jeffries) (Clayton, Victoria: Department of German, Monash University, 1985)
- Weltbürger, Textwelten: Helmut Kreuzer zum Dank (co-edited with Helmut Kreuzer) (Frankfurt am Main and New York: P. Lang, c. 1995).
- Der Eroberer: eine Parodie der Macht by Paul Weidmann (co-edited with Friedrich Voit) (Heidelberg: C. Winter, 1997)

=== Articles ===
- "Georg Forster: The 'Pacific expert' of eighteenth‐century Germany", Historical Studies: Australia and New Zealand, Volume 8, 1959, Issue 32, pp. 345–363.
- "The Art of Paradox: Volker Braun's 'Unvollendete Geschichte'", Journal of the Australasian Universities Language and Literature Association, Volume 48, 1977, Issue 1, pp. 268–282.
- "Intellectuals, writers and the Stasi files: Effects of the release of East German secret police files", Meanjin, Vol. 52, No. 1, Autumn 1993, pp. 5–22.
