= Daryl F. Mallett =

American author, editor and publisher

- Born: Los Angeles, California, U.S.
- Occupations: Publisher; editor; writer; actor; producer
- Spouses: Annette Yvonne Replogle (1991–1994); Barbara Renee Biggs (2005–2013)
- Children: 6
- Writing career
- Genres: Science fiction; fantasy; horror fiction; poetry; mystery fiction; history; historical fiction

Daryl Furumi Mallett is an American author, editor, publisher, actor, producer and screenwriter.

== Early life ==
Daryl Furumi Mallett was born on May 3, 1969, in Los Angeles, California. His father, Dr. William Robert "Bill" Mallett (1932- ) holds a Ph.D. in chemistry and worked at Union Oil Company (Union 76). His mother, Masuko (Sano) Mallett (1938- ) is a homemaker. He has an older brother, Hirofumi, and a younger sister, Stacie.

== Education ==
Mallett received a dual Interdisciplinary Humanities and Social Sciences Bachelor of Arts degree from the University of California, Riverside in 1991, specializing in Theatre Arts/Public Speaking and Creative Writing/Comparative Literatures and Languages (Speculative Fiction) under the direction of Pilgrim Award-winning author George E. Slusser. He also studied with authors like Eliud Martinez, Susan Straight, Stephen Minot, Harry Lawton, Lou Pedrotti, Stephanie Hammer, Gary Kern, Pulitzer Prize nominee Maurya Simon, actor/director Richard Russo, and Babylon 5 set designer John Iacovelli. Maulana Karenga, creator of Kwanzaa, was also his mentor for ethnic studies. Ever the overachiever, Mallett is in the process of returning to school to finish his Master of Library Information Sciences (MLIS) degree, and eventually hopes to get his MBA, MFA and PhD degrees.

== Writing ==
In the writing world, some of Mallett's duties include being a contributing writer for Water Conditioning & Purification; editor, copyeditor and proofreader for Gryphon Books; Editor-in-Chief of Fiction at Battlefield Press; author at Arcadia Publishing / History Press; founder and owner of Angel Enterprises; publisher and editor of Jacob's Ladder Books; and writing/editing books for publishers in South Carolina, Pennsylvania, Louisiana, Ohio and California.

Previous gigs have included being a grant writer for the City of Tucson, a film company, a restaurant and a nonprofit organization; technical writer at Lasertel Inc. / Leonardo-Finmeccanica; reporter for The KGVY Community Quarterly; assistant editor at Xenos Books; series editor of SFRA Press' Studies in Science Fiction, Fantasy and Horror; contributing writer for M&V Magazine, among others; reporter for four newspapers in Pinal County (Copper Basin News, Pinal Nugget, San Manuel Miner, Superior Sun); director of marketing and business development at a bookkeeping firm in Arizona; technical writing lead for an e-commerce company in California; Senior Outside Research Associate at The International Research Center in Phoenix, working on business and competitive intelligence, corporate strategy, management consulting and technical writing, mainly in the telecommunications, Internet and e-Commerce markets, as well as providing the initial layout on the Arizona Telecommunications & Information Council (ATIC) Monthly Events Calendar.

Prior to this, he was a technical editor at a mining consulting company; data management administrator and technical writer/editor at Raytheon Missile Systems; editor at Valley Publishing of three regional newspapers in Mesa/Gilbert; editor at World Publishing of four community newspapers and associate editor/reporter on an as-needed basis for 26 other newspapers and three magazines in Arizona and Nevada. In January 2004, he co-founded Prismic Publishing, a newspaper publishing company which launched its first product in July of that year and went on to publish nine monthly newspapers.

== Published works ==
Published works include a poetry anthology Full Frontal Poetry (w/Chaelyn L. Hakim and Frances McConnel, 1991); Reginald's Science Fiction and Fantasy Awards: A Comprehensive Guide to the Awards and Their Winners (w/Robert Reginald) 2nd Ed. (1991), 3rd Ed. (1993), 4th Ed. (2010); The State and Province Vital Records Guide (w/Michael and Mary Burgess, 1993); The Work of Jack Vance: An Annotated Bibliography and Guide (w/Jerry Hewett, 1994); The Work of Elizabeth Chater: An Annotated Bibliography and Guide (w/Annette Y. Mallett, 1994); Imaginative Futures: Proceedings of the 1993 Science Fiction Research Association Conference (ed. w/Milton T. Wolf, 1995); Pilgrims and Pioneers: The History and Speeches of the Science Fiction Research Association Award Winners (ed. w/Pilgrim Award winner Hal W. Hall, 2001) and Falcon Field (2009). He also served as Associate Editor on Pilgrim Award winner Robert Reginald's massive Science Fiction and Fantasy Literature, 1975–1991 (1992) and Editorial Assistant on Mark Goldstein's Arizona Telecommunications and Information Council Multitenant Building Telecommunications Access Study (2000). His first comic book, Hero-Lore #1, was released at the International ComicCon in San Diego in 1999.

His work has appeared in magazines and newspapers as diverse as Alta Mesa Times, Anticipatia, Books at UCR, Buzz, The Clearwater Chronicle, ConNotations, Copper Basin News, Environmental Times, Gilbert Lifestyle, The Grapevine, Hieroglyphs, International Ground Water, ISFA Newsletter, The Islands Current, M&V Magazine, The Newspaper of Cooper Commons, Northeast Mesa Lifestyle, Overstreet’s FAN, Perry Rhodan Magazine, The Pet Gazette, The Pinal Nugget, Red Mountain Times, Riverside Review, The San Manuel Miner, Senior Lifestyle, SFRA Newsletter, SFRA Review, SoCal Cinema News, Springfield Sunrise, Sun Lakes 2 Update, The Superior Sun, Superstition Springs Community News, Thirteen, Trails & Paths, Val Vista Lakes Community News, Ventana View, Water Conditioning & Purification, Water Technology, and more, as well as in volumes for The Borgo Press, Greenwood Press, Gryphon Publications, Jai Press, M&V Publications, St. James Press and Salem Press. He has been published in the United States, Canada, Ireland, Switzerland and Romania. Of his hundreds of publications, the two which have garnered him the most recognition are "Tongue-Tied: Bubo's Tale" in Star Wars: Tales from Jabba's Palace (ed. by Kevin J. Anderson, Bantam Books, 1996) and the storyline from the two-part Star Trek: The Next Generation episode "Birthright" (w/Barbra Wallace, Arthur Loy Holcomb and George Brozak). This makes him one of only a handful of writers in the world to have worked on both Star Trek and Star Wars.

== Film and television production ==
In the film and television world, Mallett is the founder and producer at Dustbunny Productions, partner and producer at Caribou Moving Pictures LLC and a producer at Paddlefoot Productions. In 2018, he co-founded, with Genevieve Anderson and Mark Crockett, and became chair of the Arizona Film Expo & Market

He has served as hoard finder (location scout) for "American Pickers" (two seasons) and several films with Avai Media; casting director for Illusion (2024); 2nd unit director for Murder 101 (2023); baggage wrangler (uncredited) for Dustwun (2020); producer, 2nd assistant director and casting director for Retrocausality (2019), associate producer for Illusion (2005), assistant to the producers for The Message (2004) and technical writer for Lakewood Instruments as part of the movie Sphere (1998).

== Acting ==
As an actor, TV and film appearances Mallett has appeared in Cannibal Women in the Avocado Jungle of Death, Star Trek: The Next Generation; Star Trek: Deep Space Nine; Star Trek VI: The Undiscovered Country and Carmady's People: The Case of the Reluctant Major, all in categories for which there is no Oscar Award. He spent three years dancing for Ballet Rincon in the role of Herr Stahlbaum in The Nutcracker.

He has also appeared in Disneyland's Main Street Electrical Parade and Disneyland's Bear Country Hoedown, and stage productions of Mame, Waiting in the Wings, Gilbert and Sullivan's operetta Pirates of Penzance, The Ghost Sonata, The Apple Tree, The Birthday Party, the Christmas program at the Crystal Cathedral, I Hate Shakespeare, American Buffalo, The Curious Savage, and numerous Shakespearean plays, among others, and won critical acclaim in Southern California with a DramaLogue Award and an Ebenezer Award for his performance as "Christmas Future" in Dickens' A Christmas Carol.

== Business ==
Entrepreneurially, in 1998, Mallett founded and became Chief Evangelical Officer of Blue Fire Technologies Inc., an information technology, hardware and software company focusing on mobile computing technology, which is seeking venture capital funding. Mallett was also a co-founder of AZSNAP—Arizona's Scottsdale Network at the Airpark, which was absorbed by the Scottsdale Chamber of Commerce. Together with some partners, he also founded Prismic Publishing, a company which produced newspapers for the homeowners association market.

== Miscellaneous ==
Other positions Mallett has held include director of writing and business development at Parker Madison Marketing Studio Inc., as well as serving as a consultant to small, start-up companies such as Keep It SIMple Entertainment, a manufacturer of virtual reality simulators (formerly VP, Corporate Communications); Y-Not Entertainment (formerly producer and marketing and advertising director); The Obsidian Marketing Group (co-founder and formerly Chief Operating Officer); M&V Publishing; Lake Mary Systems; and Tower Communications, among others.

Forthcoming books include: Gaslight: Tales from Whitechapel (Battlefield Press) and Arizona's Copper Corridor with Linda Scott (Arcadia Publishing).

He is currently in various stages of completion on numerous projects, including: Flavors of Arizona, Flavors of New Mexico and Imposter, with Eliza Hatfield, the first book of "The Adventures of Nevada Brown", a television series being developed by Arizona Film Studios.

== Bibliography ==
=== Nonfiction books ===
- Reginald's Science Fiction and Fantasy Awards: A Comprehensive Guide to the Awards and Their Winners, 2nd Ed., by Daryl F. Mallett & Robert Reginald. San Bernardino, CA: Borgo Press, 1991. Borgo Literary Guides, No. 1.
- Science Fiction and Fantasy Literature, 1975–1991: A Bibliography of Science Fiction, Fantasy, and Horror Fiction Books and Nonfiction Monographs, by Robert Reginald. Mary A. Burgess & Daryl F. Mallett, Associate Editors. Detroit, MI: Gale Research Co., 1992.
- Science Fiction Research Association Annual Directory, 1993, ed. by Robert J. Ewald & Joan Gordon, with Daryl F. Mallett. Garden City, NY: Nassau Community College, 1993.
- Reginald's Science Fiction and Fantasy Awards: A Comprehensive Guide to the Awards and Their Winners, 3rd Ed., by Daryl F. Mallett & Robert Reginald. San Bernardino, CA: Borgo Press, 1993.
- The State and Province Vital Records Guide, by Michael Burgess, Mary A. Burgess & Daryl F. Mallett. San Bernardino, CA: Borgo Press, 1993.
- The Work of Jack Vance: An Annotated Bibliography and Guide, by Jerry Hewett & Daryl F. Mallett. Lancaster, PA & Novato, CA: Underwood-Miller Books; San Bernardino, CA: Borgo Press, 1994.
- The Work of Elizabeth Chater: An Annotated Bibliography and Guide, by Daryl F. Mallett & Annette Y. Mallett. San Bernardino, CA: Borgo Press, 1994.
- Imaginative Futures: The Proceedings of the 1993 Science Fiction Research Association Conference, ed. by Milton T. Wolf & Daryl F. Mallett. Glendale, AZ: SFRA Pr., 1995.
- Multitenant Building Telecommunications Access Study, by Mark Goldstein. Daryl F. Mallett & Judi Mead, Editorial Assistants, Tempe, AZ: The Arizona Telecommunications and Information Council (ATIC), March 2000.
- Pilgrims & Pioneers: The History and Speeches of the Science Fiction Research Association Award Winners, ed. by Hal W. Hall & Daryl F. Mallett. Tempe, AZ: SFRA Pr., 2001 (with substantial contributions by Fiona Kelleghan).
- Arizona Telecommunications Directory. Primary Researcher: Mark Goldstein. Assistant Researchers: Daryl F. Mallett, Judi Mead & Bill Neumann, Tempe, AZ: The Arizona Telecommunications and Information Council (ATIC), 2002.
- Falcon Field, by Daryl F. Mallett. Charleston, SC: Arcadia Publishing, 2009.
- Haunted Tucson, by Daryl F. Mallett. Charleston, SC: The History Press, 2023.
- Arizona's Copper Corridor, by Daryl F. Mallett & Linda Scott. Charleston, SC: Arcadia Publishing, forthcoming.

=== Anthologies ===
- Kaiser's Gate: Tales from the Front, ed. by Daryl F. Mallett. Shreveport, Louisiana: Battlefield Press, 2013.
- Gaslight: Tales from Whitechapel, ed. by Daryl F. Mallett. Shreveport, Louisiana: Battlefield Press, forthcoming.

=== Poetry anthologies ===
- Full Frontal Poetry, ed. by Daryl F. Mallett, Chaelyn L. Hakim & Frances McConnell. Riverside, CA: FFP Publishing, 1991.

=== Short fiction ===
- "A Typical Terran's Thought When Spoken to by an Alien from the Planet Quarn in Its Native Language," by Forrest J Ackerman & Daryl F. Mallett, in ISFA Newsletter 2:10 (November 1990): 9. Reprinted in Worlds in Small: An Anthology of Miniature Literary Compositions, ed. by John Robert Colombo. Vancouver, British Columbia, Canada: Cacanadadada Press, 1992.
- "The Possible Death of Christopher Marlowe," in UCR Winter Arts Festival Writers' Competition Finalists, 1990–91, ed. by Judy Lehr. Riverside, CA: UCR Performing Arts/ASUCR, 1991.
- "Tongue-Tied: Bubo's Tale," in Star Wars: Tales from Jabba's Palace, ed. by Kevin J. Anderson. New York City: Bantam Books, 1996.
- "Women Without Men," in Other Worlds #6 (Winter 1996). Reprinted in M&V MagaZine 14:2 (August /September 1998).
- "Crystal Clear," in M&V MagaZine, Vol. 14:3 (August /September 1999), p. 10-11, 13, 24.
- "The Inn of Durant," in Tales of the Hero-Lore, ed. by Scott P. Vaughn. Chandler, Arizona: Prismic Publishing, 2005.
- "The Sun Stood Still", in Double Spiral War. Shreveport, Louisiana: Battlefield Press, 2014.
- "The Measure of a Man," in Kaiser's Gate: Tales from the Front, ed. by Daryl F. Mallett. Shreveport, Louisiana: Battlefield Press, 2013.
- The Month the Rabbits Answered Back, in Rat Bag Lit, online, 2026.
- Misfire at Close Range, in Rat Bag Lit, online, 2026.
- "Revision 12," in Pogue Too, ed. by Liksa McCabe. Las Vegas, Nevada: Raconteur Press, 2026.
- "Dark Nights," in Gaslight: Tales from Whitechapel, ed. by Daryl F. Mallett. Shreveport, Louisiana: Battlefield Press, forthcoming.
- "Canned Dreams, $1 per Bag", forthcoming.
- "The Blaylock Constant", forthcoming.

=== Comic books/graphic novels ===
- Hero-Lore #1: "The Twelve, Part I: Battlescars," written and co-plotted by Daryl F. Mallett. Phoenix: M&V Comics, 1999.

=== Serial writing/editorial credits ===
- Tesoros, co- editor, 1985–86.
- Waymark, editor, 1988–89.
- SFRA Review (formerly SFRA Newsletter), editor, 1993–94.
- Environmental Times, editor, 1994.
- Central American Times, assistant editor, 1994.
- Extrapolation, editorial board, 1994–1995.
- Other Worlds, associate editor and contributing writer, 1995- .
- The Grapevine, contributing writer, movie reviewer, 1995–97.
- Overstreet's FAN, contributing writer, 1995–97.
- Hardboiled Detectives, associate editor, 1996- .
- Water Conditioning & Purification, 1996–2005; 2022- .
- M&V MagaZine, contributing writer and editor, 1997–2010.
- Southwest Diver, contributing writer, 1998.
- Alta Mesa Times, editor, 2004–07.
- Red Mountain Times, editor, 2004–07.
- Superstition Springs Community News, editor, 2004–07.
- Trails & Paths, editor, 2004–07.
- The Islands Current, associate editor, 2004–07.
- The Pride of Cooper Commons, associate editor, 2004–07.
- Val Vista Lakes Community News, associate editor, 2004–07.
- Inside Ocotillo, associate editor, 2004–07.
- Gilbert Lifestyle, editor, 2004–05.
- Northeast Mesa Lifestyle, editor, 2004–05.
- Senior Lifestyle, editor, 2004–05.
- Copper Basin News, reporter, 2009–10.
- Pinal Nugget, reporter, 2009–10.
- San Manuel Miner, reporter, 2009–10.
- Superior Sun, reporter, 2009–10.
- The Tusker Times, editor, 2009–11.
- Sahuarita Sun, reporter, 2010–11.
- The KGVY Community Quarterly, reporter, 2012–13.
- The Tusker Times, editor, 2022–24.

=== Short nonfiction ===
- "Introduction", by Daryl F. Mallett & Robert Reginald, in Reginald's Science Fiction and Fantasy Awards, 2nd Ed., by Daryl F. Mallett & Robert Reginald. San Bernardino, California: The Borgo Press, 1991. Borgo Literary Guides, No. 1.
- "Introduction", by Daryl F. Mallett & Robert Reginald, in Reginald's Science Fiction and Fantasy Awards, 3rd Ed., by Daryl F. Mallett & Robert Reginald. San Bernardino, California: The Borgo Press, 1993. Borgo Literary Guides, No. 1.
- "Foreword: Milady Elizabeth", by Daryl F. Mallett & Annette Y. Mallett, in The Work of Elizabeth Chater: An Annotated Bibliography & Guide, by Daryl F. Mallett & Annette Y. Mallett. San Bernardino, California: The Borgo Press, 1994. Bibliographies of Modern Authors, No. 27.
- "Introduction", by Milton T. Wolf & Daryl F. Mallett, in Imaginative Futures: Proceedings of the 1993 Science Fiction Research Association Conference, ed. by Milton T. Wolf & Daryl F. Mallett. Tempe, Arizona: SFRA Press, 1995. SFRA Studies in Science Fiction, Fantasy and Horror, No. 2.
- "Foreword: Two Years and Two Hundred Hours", by Jerry Hewett & Daryl F. Mallett, in The Work of Jack Vance: An Annotated Bibliography & Guide, by Jerry Hewett & Daryl F. Mallett. San Bernardino, California: The Borgo Press, 1995. Bibliographies of Modern Authors, No. 29.
- "Fantasy Literature", by Fiona Kelleghan & Daryl F. Mallett, in Genre and Ethnic Collections: Collected Essays, ed. by Milton T. Wolf & Murray S. Martin. Greenwich, Connecticut: JAI Press, 1996. Foundations in Information and Library Science, Vol. 38.
- "Horror Literature", by Fiona Kelleghan & Daryl F. Mallett, in Genre and Ethnic Collections: Collected Essays, ed. by Milton T. Wolf & Murray S. Martin. Greenwich, Connecticut: JAI Press, 1996. Foundations in Information and Library Science, Vol. 38.
- "Ozone Hits the Big Screen", by Daryl F. Mallett, in Water Conditioning & Purification 39:9 (October 1997), 92-94.
- “Solar- or Light-Sails”, in Innovative Technologies from Science Fiction for Space Applications. European Space Agency (ESA) Publication # BR-176 (June 2001), p. 14-16.
- “Wearable Computers”, in Innovative Technologies from Science Fiction for Space Applications. European Space Agency (ESA) Publication # BR-176 (June 2001), p. 31-32.
- “Space Tethers”, in Innovative Technologies from Science Fiction for Space Applications. European Space Agency (ESA) Publication # BR-176 (June 2001), p. 44.
- "Introduction", by Daryl F. Mallett & Connie Gullatt-Whiteman, in Falcon Field by Daryl F. Mallett. Charleston, South Carolina: Arcadia Publishing, 2009.
- “10 DCEU Characters Who Haven’t Made an Appearance in Ages,” CBR.com (Jun. 18, 2022), https://www.cbr.com/dceu-characters-absent-not-seen/
- “10 Recent Horror Movie Locations You Can Visit in Real Life,” CBR.com (Jul. 7, 2022), https://www.cbr.com/horror-movie-locations-visit-real-life/.
- "Water Resilience, Part 1: The Tucson Blueprint for Advanced Water Purification", by Daryl F. Mallett, in Water Conditioning & Purification 68:2 (Mar/Apr 2026), 18-22.
- "Introduction", by Daryl F. Mallett & Linda F. Scott, in Arizona's Copper Corridor by Daryl F. Mallett. Charleston, South Carolina: Arcadia Publishing, forthcoming.

=== Non-proprietary editorial credits ===
- One Day with God: A Guide to Retreats & The Contemplative Life, Rev. Ed., by Bishop Karl Prüter, (ed. by Daryl F. Mallett). San Bernardino, CA: St. Willibrord's Press, December 1991. [Religious devotional]
- Inside Science Fiction: Essays on Fantastic Literature, by James E. Gunn, (ed. by Daryl F. Mallett). San Bernardino, CA: Borgo Press, June 1992. [Literary criticism]
- Vultures of the Void: A History of British Science Fiction Publishing, 1946–1956, by Philip Harbottle & Stephen Holland, ed. by Daryl F. Mallett. San Bernardino, CA: Borgo Press, December 1992. [Literary history]
- The Russian Orthodox Church Outside Russia: A History & Chronology, by Rev. Father Alexey Young, ed. by Bishop Karl Prüter, Paul David Seldis [and Daryl F. Mallett]. San Bernardino, CA: Borgo Press, March 1993. [Religious history]
- The Transylvanian Library: A Consumer's Guide to Vampire Fiction, by Greg Cox, ed. by Daryl F. Mallett. San Bernardino, CA: Borgo Press, March 1993. [Reference/Literary criticism]
- Adventures of a Freelancer: The Literary Exploits & Autobiography of Stanton A. Coblentz, by Stanton A. Coblentz, with Jeffrey M. Elliot, ed. by Scott Alan Burgess [and Daryl F. Mallett]. San Bernardino, CA: Borgo Press, May 1993. [Autobiography]
- Geo. Alec Effinger: From Entropy to Budayeen, by Ben P. Indick, ed. by Daryl F. Mallett. San Bernardino, CA: Borgo Press, August 1993. [Author studies/Literary criticism]
- Mary Roberts Rinehart, Mistress of Mystery, by Frances H. Bachelder, ed. by Dale Salwak & Daryl F. Mallett. San Bernardino, CA: Borgo Press, October 1993. [Author studies/Literary criticism]
- Wilderness Visions: The Western Theme in Science Fiction Literature, 2nd Ed., by David Mogen, ed. by Daryl F. Mallett. San Bernardino, CA: Borgo Press, October 1993. [Literary history/criticism]
- Dragons & Martinis: The Skewed Realism of John Cheever, by Michael D. Byrne, ed. by Dale Salwak, Paul David Seldis [and Daryl F. Mallett]. San Bernardino, CA: Borgo Press, October 1993. [Author studies/Literary criticism]
- Libido into Literature: The "Primera Época" of Benito Pérez Galdós, by Clark M. Zlotchew, ed. by Daryl F. Mallett. San Bernardino, CA: Borgo Press, October 1993. [Literary history/Spanish literature]
- The Price of Paradise: The Magazine Career of F. Scott Fitzgerald, by Stephen Potts, ed. by Paul David Seldis, John Hansen Gurley [and Daryl F. Mallett]. San Bernardino, CA: Borgo Press, October 1993. [Author studies/Literary criticism]
- A Wayfarer in a World in Upheaval, by Bernard L. Ginsburg, ed. by Nathan Kravetz [and Daryl F. Mallett]. San Bernardino, CA: Borgo Press, 1993. [Jewish history]
- International Society of Meeting Planners 1993 Directory of Members & Industry Professionals, (ed. by Daryl F. Mallett). Scottsdale, AZ: International Society of Meeting Planners (Todd Publishing), 1993. [directory]
- Association of Construction Inspectors 1993–1994 Directory of Members & Industry Professionals, (ed. by Daryl F. Mallett). Scottsdale, AZ: Association of Construction Inspectors (Todd Publishing), 1993. [directory]
- 1994 Directory of Designated Members: CRA – Administrative; CRA – Certified Review Appraiser; RMU – Registered Mortgage Underwriter, (ed. by Daryl F. Mallett). Scottsdale, AZ: National Association of Review Appraisers & Mortgage Underwriters (Todd Publishing), 1994. [directory]
- Federal & State Environmental Agencies Directory, (ed. by Daryl F. Mallett). Scottsdale, AZ: Environmental Assessment Association (Todd Publishing), 1994. [directory]
- The Complete Guide of Environmental Inspection Forms, (ed. by Daryl F. Mallett). Scottsdale, AZ: Environmental Assessment Association (Todd Publishing), 1994. [reference]
- Environmental Assessment Association Directory of Members, (ed. by Daryl F. Mallett). Scottsdale, AZ: Environmental Assessment Association (Todd Publishing), 1994. [directory]
- Complying with the Foreign Investments in Real Property Tax Act: Complete with Appropriate Forms, [by Daryl F. Mallett]. Scottsdale, AZ: International Real Estate Institute, 1994.
- British Science Fiction Paperbacks & Magazines, 1949–1956: An Annotated Bibliography & Guide, by Philip Harbottle & Stephen Holland, ed. by Daryl F. Mallett & Michael Burgess. San Bernardino, CA: Borgo Press, 1994. [Literary guide]
- Speaking of Horror: Interviews with Writers of the Supernatural, by Darrell Schweitzer, ed. by Daryl F. Mallett. San Bernardino, CA: Borgo Press, 1994. [Interviews]
- The Work of William Eastlake: An Annotated Bibliography & Guide, by W. C. Bamberger, ed. by Boden Clarke & Daryl F. Mallett. San Bernardino, CA: Borgo Press, 1994. [Bibliography]
- Firefly: A Novel of the Far Future, by Brian Stableford, (ed. by Daryl F. Mallett). San Bernardino, CA: Unicorn & Son Publishers, 1994. [Novel]
- Christopher Isherwood: A World in Evening, by Kay Ferres, ed. by Dale Salwak [and Daryl F. Mallett]. San Bernardino, CA: Borgo Press, 1994. [Literary criticism]
- W. E. B. Du Bois: His Contributions to Pan-Africanism, by Kwadwo O. Pobi-Asamani, ed. by Daryl F. Mallett. San Bernardino, CA: Borgo Press, 1994. [Black political studies]
- Roald Dahl: From the Gremlins to the Chocolate Factory, Second Edition, by Alan Warren, ed. by Dale Salwak & Daryl F. Mallett. San Bernardino, CA: Borgo Press, 1994. [Literary criticism]
- Christopher Hampton: An Introduction to His Plays, by William J. Free, ed. by Daryl F. Mallett. San Bernardino, CA: Borgo Press, 1994. [Literary criticism]
- The Environmental Inspector's Guide to The National Environmental Policy Act. Scottsdale, AZ: Environmental Assessment Association (Todd Publishing), 1995.
- The Environmental Inspector's Guide to The Clean Air Act. Scottsdale, AZ: Environmental Assessment Association (Todd Publishing), 1995.
- The Environmental Inspector's Guide to The Clean Water Act. Scottsdale, AZ: Environmental Assessment Association (Todd Publishing), 1995.
- The Environmental Inspector's Guide to The Comprehensive Environmental Response, Compensation, and Liability Act. Scottsdale, AZ: Environmental Assessment Association (Todd Publishing), 1995.
- The Environmental Inspector's Guide to The Resource Conservation & Recovery Act. Scottsdale, AZ: Environmental Assessment Association (Todd Publishing), 1995.
- The Environmental Inspector's Guide to The Occupational Safety & Health Act. Scottsdale, AZ: Environmental Assessment Association (Todd Publishing), 1995.
- The Environmental Inspector's Guide to The Environmental Protection & Community Right-to-Know Act. Scottsdale, AZ: Environmental Assessment Association (Todd Publishing), 1995.
- The Environmental Inspector's Guide to Comprehensive Guidelines. Scottsdale, AZ: Environmental Assessment Association (Todd Publishing), 1995.
- Street Kids & Other Plays, by Brio Burgess, ed. by Daryl F. Mallett. Tempe, AZ: Jacob's Ladder Books/Angel Enterprises, September 1995; 2nd print., June 1996. [Collection of plays]
- The Chinese Economy: A Bibliography of Works in English, by Robert Goehlert & Anthony C. Stamtoplos, ed. by Daryl F. Mallett, Mary A. Burgess & Xiwen Zhang. San Bernardino, CA: Borgo Press, 1995. [Reference]
- Pandora's Box: A Science Fiction Thriller, by E. C. Tubb, (ed. by Daryl F. Mallett). Brooklyn, NY: Gryphon Publications, 1996. [Science fiction novel]
- Beneath the Red Star: Studies on International Science Fiction, by George Zebrowski, ed. by Pamela Sargent [and Daryl F. Mallett]. San Bernardino, CA: Borgo Press, 1996. [Collection of literary criticism]
- Islands in the Sky: The Space Station Theme in Science Fiction Literature, by Gary Westfahl, (ed. by Daryl F. Mallett). San Bernardino, CA: Borgo Press, 1996. [Literary history/criticism]
- Seven by Seven: Interviews with American Science Fiction Writers of the West & Southwest, by Neal Wilgus, (ed. by Daryl F. Mallett). San Bernardino, CA: Borgo Press, 1996. [Interviews]
- Shroud Me Not: A Harvey St. John Short Novel, by Harold Q. Masur, (ed. by Daryl F. Mallett)/Dig My Grave: A Scott Jordan Short Novel, by Harold Q. Masur, (ed. by Daryl F. Mallett). Brooklyn, NY: Gryphon Books, 1996. [Double hardboiled detective novel]
- Amazing Pulp Heroes: A Celebration of the Glorious Pulp Magazines, by Frank Hamilton & Link Hullar, (ed. by Daryl F. Mallett). Brooklyn, NY: Gryphon Books, October 1996. [Literary history]
- Sarasha: A Novel of the Future, by Gary Lovisi, (ed. by Daryl F. Mallett). Brooklyn, NY: Gryphon Books, 1997. [Science fiction novel]
- Murder Wears a Halo: A Mystery Crime Thriller, by Howard Browne, (ed. by Daryl F. Mallett). Brooklyn, NY: Gryphon Books, 1997. [Hardboiled detective novel]
- Mitzi: A Mystery Crime Thriller, by Michael Avallone, (ed. by Daryl F. Mallett). Brooklyn, NY: Gryphon Books, 1997. [Hardboiled detective novel]
- The Brothers Challis, Featuring Bart Challis, in The Pop-Op Caper, with A Long Time Dying: Two Bart Challis Detective Thrillers, by William F. Nolan, (ed. by Daryl F. Mallett)/The Brothers Challis, Featuring Nick Challis, in The Pulpcon Kill, with "And the Beat Goes On," A Special Introduction, by William F. Nolan, (ed. by Daryl F. Mallett). Brooklyn, NY: Gryphon Books, January 1997. [Double hardboiled detective novel]
- Letters from Dwight, by Gary Kern, (ed. by Daryl F. Mallett). Grand Terrace, CA: Xenos Books, 1998. [Mainstream novel]
- Alien Life, by E. C. Tubb, (ed. by Daryl F. Mallett). Brooklyn, NY: Gryphon Books, 1998. [Science fiction novel]
- The Fortress of Utopia, by Jack Williamson, (ed. by Daryl F. Mallett). Brooklyn, NY: Gryphon Books. 1998. [Science fiction novel]
- The Work of Raymond Z. Gallun: An Annotated Bibliography & Guide, by Jeffrey M. Elliot, ed. by Boden Clarke & Daryl F. Mallett. San Bernardino, CA: Borgo Press, 1999. [Author bibliography]
- The Whispering Gorilla, by Don Wilcox, (ed. by Daryl F. Mallett)/Return of the Whispering Gorilla, by David V. Reed, (ed. by Daryl F. Mallett). Brooklyn, NY: Gryphon Books, 1999. [Double science fiction novel]
- The Slitherers, by John Russell Fearn, (ed. by Daryl F. Mallett). Brooklyn, NY: Gryphon Books, 1999. [Science fiction novel]
- Lord of Atlantis: A Golden Amazon Adventure, by John Russell Fearn, (ed. by Daryl F. Mallett). Brooklyn, NY: Gryphon Books, 1999. [Science fiction novel]
- The Gargoyle, by Gary Lovisi, (ed. by Daryl F. Mallett). Brooklyn, NY: Gryphon Books, 2000. [Science fiction novel]
- Wail!, by Brio Burgess, ed. by Gail Tolley [& Daryl F. Mallett]. Tempe, AZ: Jacob's Ladder Books/Angel Enterprises, 2002. [Collection of plays & poetry]
- Pulp Crime Classics, ed. by Gary Lovisi [& Daryl F. Mallett]. Brooklyn, NY: Gryphon Books, 2002. [Collection]
- True & Almost True Stories, by Howard Schoenfeld (ed. by Daryl F. Mallett). Brooklyn, NY: Gryphon Publications, 2004. [Collection]
- Out of the Darkness, Into the Light: A Book of Life, by R. E. Hatton (ed. by Daryl F. Mallett). Gilbert, AZ: Wisteria House Publishers, 2005. [Biography]
- The Sherlock Holmes Stories of Edward D. Hoch, by Edward D. Hoch (ed. by Daryl F. Mallett). Brooklyn, NY: Gryphon Publications, 2008. [Short story collection]
- Age is an Attitude: Tips and Tricks for Young People Over 60, by Jim Tilmon, (ed. by Daryl F. Mallett). Scottsdale, AZ: BookBaby, 2011. [Nonfiction]
- Pyromancer, by Don Callander (ed. by Daryl F. Mallett). Cincinnati, OH: Mundania Press, 2013. Mancer #1. [Fantasy novel]
- Aquamancer, by Don Callander (ed. by Daryl F. Mallett). Cincinnati, OH: Mundania Press, 2013. Mancer #2. [Fantasy novel]
- Geomancer, by Don Callander (ed. by Daryl F. Mallett). Cincinnati, OH: Mundania Press, 2013. Mancer #3. [Fantasy novel]
- Aeromancer, by Don Callander (ed. by Daryl F. Mallett). Cincinnati, OH: Mundania Press, 2013. Mancer #4. [Fantasy novel]
- Things in Revolt: The Theater of Lev Lunts, by Lev Lunts, translated by Gary Kern, (ed. by Daryl F. Mallett). Santa Fe, NM: Xenos Books, 2014. [Anthology of plays, articles, screenplays]
- Dealin’ with the Dead, by Mark Crockett (ed. by Daryl F. Mallett). Mesa, AZ: Paddlefoot Press, 2014. [Mystery novel]
- I Just Wanted to Fly, by Jim Tilmon, (ed. by Daryl F. Mallett). Scottsdale, AZ: CaptT Books, 2019. [Autobiography]
- Hammer and Anvil, by Jordan Thomas, (ed. by Daryl F. Mallett). Huntsville, AL: Jordan Thomas Books, 2026.

=== Stage productions ===
- Mame (VHS Drama Dept.), 1985. Mr. Upson.
- Disneyland's Main Street Electrical Parade (Disneyland), 1985–86. Toy Soldier.
- Disneyland's Bear Country Hoedown (Disneyland), 1985–86. Dancer.
- Waiting in the Wings (VHS Drama Dept.), 1986 Boy.
- A Christmas Carol (UCR Drama Dept.), 1986. Christmas Future. DramaLogue Award.
- Pirates of Penzance (Carson Civic Light Opera), 1987. Pirate.
- The Apple Tree (Long Beach Civic Light Opera), 1987. Stage Crew.
- The Ghost Sonata (UCR Drama Dept.), 1988. Stage Crew.
- The Birthday Party (UCR Drama Dept.), 1989. Audio Crew.
- The Curious Savage (Differently Abled Entertainment), 2023. Judge Samuel Savage.
- American Buffalo (Differently Abled Entertainment), 2024. Understudy for Don.
- I Hate Shakespeare (Differently Abled Entertainment), 2024. Bill Shakespeare, Othello, Puck.

=== Dance ===
- A Christmas Carol (Carson Civic Light Opera), 1986. Christmas Future. Ebenezer Award.
- The Nutcracker (Ballet Rincon), 2019–21. Herr Stahlbaum.

=== Television ===
- Star Trek: The Next Generation (Paramount Pictures), 1987–94. Extra in several episodes.
- Star Trek: The Next Generation: Birthright, Part 1 (Paramount Pictures), 1991. Uncredited storyline co-creator, with Barbra Wallace, Arthur Loy Holcomb & George Brozak.
- Star Trek: The Next Generation: Birthright, Part 2 (Paramount Pictures), 1991. Uncredited storyline co-creator, with Barbra Wallace, Arthur Loy Holcomb & George Brozak.
- Star Trek: Deep Space 9 (Paramount Pictures), 1993–99. Extra in several episodes.
- American Pickers: Desert Gold Rush (Discovery), 2020. Location scout.
- American Pickers: Chopper King (Discovery), 2020. Location scout.
- American Pickers (Discovery), 2024. Location scout.
- Blazin' Brandon (Tumbleweed Productions), filming. Producer, 2nd camera, Judge Smith.
- The Adventures of Nevada Brown (Arizona Film Studios, filming). Writer, producer, director, James Earl “Buster" Brown.
- Apocalypse, Inc. (Arizona Film Studios), pre-production. Producer, director, Raphael.

=== Film ===
- Cannibal Women in the Avocado Jungle of Death (Guacamole Productions), 1988, Extra.
- Carmady's People: The Case of the Reluctant Major (Cencom Cable), 1990. Thug #2.
- Star Trek VI: The Undiscovered Country (Paramount Pictures), 1991. Extra.>
- Sphere (Warner Bros.), 1998. Technical Writer.
- The Message (Caribou Moving Pictures), 2004. Assistant to the Producer.
- Illusion (Draco Productions), 2005. Associate Producer.
- National Treasure: Book of Secrets (Walt Disney Studios), 2007. Extra.
- Retrocausality (Caribou Moving Pictures), 2019. Producer, casting director, 2nd assistant director, stand-in for Wayne Lundy.
- Turkeystuffer (Paddlefoot Productions), 2019. Consulting producer.
- Dustwun (Dow Jazz Films), 2020. Luggage wrangler (production assistant).
- Parallel Tracks: Railroad Queens of the Movies, Part 1 (Bobcat Productions), 2021. Special thanks.
- Murder 101 (Headley International Pictures), 2023. Associate producer, 2nd unit director.
- Magic Mike (Tiphani Law Films), 2024. Story.
- A Question of Guilt (Avai Media), 2024. Location scout.
- Immortal (Full Moon Productions), 2024. Casting director.
- Clouds to the Horizon (Avai Film), 2024. Location scout, grip.
- Nevada Brown Size Reel 1 (Arizona Film Studios), 2025, Producer, director, James Earl 'Buster' Brown, Jr.
- Interview with The Adventures of Nevada Brown Show runners 1 (Arizona Film Studios), 2025, Producer, self.
- An Even Score (Avai Film), 2026. Behind the scenes photographer.
- Open in Case of Emergency (Behar Films), 2026. Props.
- Barrett (MST), 2026. Funeral attendee.
- Gallo's Grave (Arizona Western Legends), post-production. Producer, fog machine operator, craft services assistant.
- M35 (Avondale Pictures), post-production. Kidnap Victim.
- Never Gunna Leave You (Headley International Films), post-production. Location scout, location manager, craft services assistant, catering manager.
- Double Crossed in Vulture City (Magic Mike Productions), filming. Mr. Cooper.

In development:

- A Kind of Mystery (Avai Media), in production. Locations, producer, writer.
- Dealin' with the Dead (Paddlefoot Productions), in development. Producer.
- Falcon Field (Arizona Film Studios), in development. Producer, writer, creator.
- Greenbriar (Caribou Moving Pictures), on hold. Producer.
- Hidden Notes (Arizona Film Studios), in development. Producer, writer, creator.
- In Search of Steven Spielberg (Caribou Moving Pictures), on hold. Producer.
- Lien on Me (Arizona Film Studios), in development. Producer, screenplay.
- Penny for Your Thoughts (Paddlefoot Productions), in development. Producer.
- Operation: Tatum (Arizona Film Market & Expo), in development. Producer.
- Redemption (Caribou Moving Pictures), in pre-production. Producer, based on a story by.
- Turtle Summer (Caribou Moving Pictures), on hold. Producer.
- Unfailing Faith (Arizona Film Studios), in development. Producer, screenplay.
- Viva, McDuff! (Caribou Moving Pictures), on hold. Producer.

=== Radio and podcasts ===
- California Haunts, 2024. Self.

=== Honors and awards ===
- DramaLogue Award (1986), “Best Christmas Future” for performance as Christmas Future in Charles Dickens’s A Christmas Carol at UC Riverside.
- Ebenezer Award (1986), for performance as Christmas Future in Charles Dickens’s A Christmas Carol at Carson Civic Light Opera.
- Winter Arts Festival Writers' Competition Finalist: Short Story Competition, University of California, Riverside, 1991.
- Winter Arts Festival Writers' Competition Finalist: Poetry Competition, University of California, Riverside, 1991.
- Locus Recommended Reading List (1992) for Reginald's Science Fiction and Fantasy Awards: A Comprehensive Guide to the Awards and Their Winners, Second Edition, Revised and Expanded, by Daryl F. Mallett & Robert Reginald.
- Locus Recommended Reading List (1992) for Science Fiction and Fantasy Literature: A Bibliography, 1975–1991: A Bibliography of Science Fiction, Fantasy, and Horror Fiction Books and Nonfiction Monographs, by Robert Reginald. Associate Editors: Mary A. Burgess & Daryl F. Mallett. Editorial Assistants & Advisors: Scott Alan Burgess, John Clute, William G. Contento, John Hansen Gurley, Douglas Menville & Paul David Seldis.
- Locus Recommended Reading List (1994) for Reginald's Science Fiction and Fantasy Awards: A Comprehensive Guide to the Awards and Their Winners, Third Edition, Revised and Expanded, by Daryl F. Mallett & Robert Reginald.
- Dean's Honor Roll, Rio Salado Community College, 1994.
