= Ariann Black =

American magician

Ariann Black (also spelled Arian Black earlier in her career) is a magician based in Las Vegas, Nevada. She has headlined her own show in Vegas and appeared on several national and international television shows. She is known in the magic world for her efforts to encourage and promote other female performers. She was voted Female Magician of the Year in 2004 and International Female Magician of the Year in 2008 & 2009.

Black was born in Canada and began doing magic when she was five years old. She began performing magic professionally at 19 and moved to New York, where she worked at the Trump Plaza Hotel and Casino and Trump's Castle in Atlantic City. That led to various international work, and after several years, she settled in Las Vegas.

In Vegas, she has headlined her own magic show Secrets, which first played at the Fitzgerald's Hotel and Casino. A new, larger version of Secrets opened at the Westin Hotel Casino in 2010. Ariann has also appeared in a number of other shows in major venues, including Splash at the Riviera. In 2008, she was the opening act for The Amazing Jonathan. She also does a large amount of corporate work.

On television, she has appeared in two episodes of Steve Harvey's Big Time. She has also appeared on an Animal Planet special with Lance Burton. She has appeared in BBC shows, and series for French and Italian networks and for the Canadian network CBC. She made her last TV appearance on Pawn Stars in 2014.

Black studied with the late Doug Henning, and with Dale Salwak at the Chavez School of Magic.
