= Veronica Hollinger =

Canadian editor and academic

Veronica Hollinger (1947- ) is a Canadian science fiction scholar and editor.

Her work has been recognized with the Lifetime Contribution award from the Science Fiction Research Association (SFRA) in 2021, the Thomas D. Clareson Award for Distinguished Service in 2018 and the inaugural SFRA Pioneer Award in 1990.

Hollinger has co-edited Science Fiction Studies since 1991 and taught at Trent University until her 2016 retirement. She was educated at Marianopolis College (BA), Newcastle University (MEd), and Concordia University (MA and PhD).

Her articles and book chapters have explored climate fiction, feminist science fiction, sexuality and science fiction, Chinese science fiction postmodernism, and vampires as well as the writings of Mary Shelley, James Tiptree Jr., Margaret Atwood, and Gwyneth Jones.

== Honors and awards ==
- SFRA Pioneer Award (1990)
- Thomas D. Clareson Award for Distinguished Service (2018)
- SFRA Lifetime Contribution Award (2021)

== Edited collections ==
- Blood Read: The Vampire as Metaphor in Contemporary Culture with Joan Gordon and Brian Aldiss (1997)
- Edging into the Future: Science Fiction and Contemporary Cultural Transformation with Joan Gordon. (2002)
- Queer Universes: Sexualities and Science Fiction with Wendy Gay Pearson and Joan Gordon (2008)
- Wesleyan Anthology of Science Fiction with Arthur B. Evans, Istvan Csicsery-Ronay Jr., Joan Gordon, Rob Latham, and Carol McGuirk (2010)
- Parabolas of Science Fiction (2013) with Brian Attebery
