= Reading Science Fiction =

Essay collection

- First edition cover
- Editor: James Gunn, Marleen S. Barr & Matthew Candelaria.
- Cover artist: Mel Hunter
- Publisher: Palgrave Macmillan

Reading Science Fiction is a collection of 22 short essays edited by James Gunn, Marleen S. Barr & Matthew Candelaria. The collection explores a wide range of theoretical approaches to studying science fiction, such as gender studies, post colonialism and structuralism. The authors reference the various mediums through which science fiction has appeared including literature, film, television, as well as video games to define science fiction as a genre, trace its origins, as well as its parallels with contemporary society.

== Sections ==
- Introduction - James Gunn

=== Part I: Mapping Science Fiction ===
- Defining Science Fiction - Eric S. Rabkin
- What is Science Fiction - and How It Grew - H. Bruce Franklin
- Narrative Strategies in Science Fiction - Brian Stableford
- There is No Such Thing as Science Fiction - Sherryl Vint & Mark Bould

=== Part II: Science Fiction and Popular Culture ===
- Science Fiction Movies: the Feud of Eye and Idea - George Zebrowski
- The Feedback Loop - Michael Cassutt
- Computers in Science Fiction - Brooks Landon
- Cross Fertilization or Coincidence? Science Fiction and videogames - Orson Scott Card

=== Part III: Theoretical Approaches to Science Fiction ===
- Gender is a problem that can be solved - Jane Donawerth
- Marxism and Science Fiction - Carl Freedman
- Reading Science Fiction with Postcolonial Theory - Matthew Candelaria
- Encountering International Science Fiction Through a Latin American Lens - Roberto de Sousa Causo

=== Part IV: Reading Science Fiction in the Classroom ===
- Reading Science Fiction as Science Fiction - James Gunn
- Reading Joanna Russ in Context: Science, Utopia and Post modernity - Jeanne Cortiel
- Reading Science Fiction's Interdisciplinary Conversation with Science and Technology STudies -R. Doug Davis & Lisa Yazek

=== Part V: Science Fiction and Diverse Disciplines ===
- Neuroscience Fiction Redux - Joseph D. Miller
- Physics through Science Fiction - Gregory Benford
- Science Fiction and Biology - Pamela Sargent
- Science Fiction and Philosophy - James Gunn
- Science Fiction and the Internet - Bruce Sterling
- The Reading Science Fiction Blog - Marleen S. Barr

== Reception ==
Several of the collection's essays were praised, however, the collection as a whole received criticism for not being entirely accessible to students new to science fiction.
