= Mary Kenny Badami =

American college professor

- Mary Kenny Badami, from a 1979 newspaper
- Born: Mary Roseann Kenny; August 30, 1941; The Bronx, New York, U.S.
- Died: June 11, 2010 (age 68); Bloomsburg, Pennsylvania, U.S.
- Occupations: Writer, educator

Mary Kenny Badami (August 30, 1941 – June 11, 2010) was an American educator and writer. She was a communications professor at Bloomsburg University from 1981 to 2006, and is known for her 1976 essay, "A Feminist Critique of Science Fiction".

== Early life and education ==
Kenny was born in the Bronx, the daughter of Francis Gerard Kenny and Ann Frances McElhone Kenny. Her father worked in construction; her maternal grandparents were both born in Ireland. She graduated from Fordham University, and earned a master's degree at Hunter College in 1965. She completed her Ph.D. in communication studies at Northwestern University in 1977, with a dissertation titled "Interpersonal Perceptions and Outcomes of Communication in a Simulation Game of Intercultural Contact".

== Career ==
Badami taught public school as a young woman, and taught English in Münich in the 1960s. She taught at the University of Virginia, Memorial University of Newfoundland, and at the University of Wisconsin–Milwaukee in the 1970s. She was a professor at Bloomsburg University from 1981 to 2006. She became a full professor in 1988, and chaired the university's Communication Studies department for six years. She lectured for community groups and at conferences, on effective communication, women's careers, and gendered vocabulary. At Bloomsburg, she was public in her support for non-traditional-age women students, minority students, and LGBTQ students.

In 1966, Badami was a four-day champion on the Jeopardy! television quiz show. She was a White House Fellows finalist in 1974. She was vice-president of the Science Fiction Research Association. "It helps us predict not the future, but possible futures," she explained of the genre, when she was interviewed about the appeal of Star Wars in 1978.

== Publications ==
- "A Feminist Critique of Science Fiction" (1970, 1976) (also published in German, in 1980)
- "Interpersonal perceptions in a simulation game of intercultural contact" (1977)
- "Four Cheers for Bafá Bafá" (1979)
- "Interracial Communication in School Social Work" (1984, with R. L. McNeely)

Badami's essay "A Feminist Critique of Science Fiction" was and continues to be discussed by feminist scholars of science fiction.

== Personal life ==
Kenny was married to James A. Badami from 1962 to 1974, and had two children, Linda and Scott. In 1994, she was interviewed as an eyewitness to the fatal fire at the Beta Sigma Delta House at Bloomsburg University. In 2001, she spoke to the local press about her experience with LASIK surgery, which she said damaged her vision and health. Badami died in 2010, at the age of 68, at her home in Bloomsburg.
