= Pilgrims & Pioneers =

2001 book collection

Pilgrims & Pioneers: The History and Speeches of the Science Fiction Research Association Award Winners is a book collection of all the extant award presentations and acceptance speeches of the first 30 Pilgrim Award winners, and of the other Science Fiction Research Association awards through 1999, edited by Hal W. Hall and Daryl F. Mallett. It was published in Riverside, California by Jacob's Ladder Books, for SFRA Press, in 2001.

Historical documents, critical papers and statements are supplemented by brief biographic sketches of the winners and selective bibliographies of their scholarly contributions.

Publication of this book was supported by a grant from the World Science Fiction Convention, held in Atlanta that year. Scholar Neil Barron discovered a Call for Grant Projects by the Atlanta WorldCon Committee, and a proposal for a book honoring the Pilgrim Award winners was submitted and accepted by the committee. Under the terms of the grant, the SFRA donated copies of the volume to up to 25 major science fiction collections worldwide.

Daryl F. Mallett and Hal W. Hall had assistance from many scholars of science fiction, especially Fiona Kelleghan and Robert Reginald.
