= SFRA Pioneer Award =

The Pioneer Award is given by the Science Fiction Research Association to the writer or writers of the best critical essay-length work of the year. In 2019 it was renamed the SFRA Innovative Research Award.

== Winners ==
Resource

- 1990: Veronica Hollinger, "The Vampire and the Alien: Variations on the Outsider"
- 1991: H. Bruce Franklin, "The Vietnam War as American Science Fiction and Fantasy"
- 1992: Istvan Csiscery-Ronay Jr., "The SF of Theory: Baudrillard and Haraway"
- 1993: No Award
- 1994: Larry McCaffery and Takayuki Tatsumi, "Towards the Theoretical Frontiers of Fiction: From Metafiction and Cyberpunk through Avant-Pop"
- 1995: Roger Luckhurst, "The Many Deaths of Science Fiction: A Polemic"
- 1996: Brian Stableford, "How Should a Science Fiction Story End?"
- 1997: John Moore, "Shifting Frontiers: Cyberpunk and the American South"
- 1998: I. F. Clarke, "Future—War Fiction: The First Main Phase, 1871-1900"
- 1999: Carl Freedman, "Kubrick's 2001 and the Possibility of a Science-Fiction Cinema"
- 2000: Wendy Pearson, "Alien Cryptographies: The View from Queer," published in the March 1999 issue of Science Fiction Studies.
- 2001: De Witt Douglas Kilgore, "Changing Regimes: Vonda N. McIntyre's Parodic Astrofuturism," published in the July 2000 issue of Science Fiction Studies.
- 2002: Judith Berman, "Science Fiction Without the Future," published in the May 2001 issue of The New York Review of Science Fiction
- 2003: Lance Olsen, "Omniphage," from the Edging into the Future collection
- 2004: Andrew M. Butler, "Thirteen Ways of Looking at the British Boom," published in the November 2003 issue of Science Fiction Studies.
- 2005: Lisa Yaszek, "The Women History Doesn't See: Recovering Midcentury Women's SF as a Literature of Social Critique," published in Extrapolation 45(1): 34-51.
- 2006: Maria DeRose, "Redefining Women's Power Through Science Fiction," published in Extrapolation 46(1): 66-89.
- 2007: Amy J. Ransom, "Oppositional Postcolonialism in Québécois Science Fiction," published in Science-Fiction Studies 33(2): 291-312.
- 2008: Sherryl Vint, "Speciesism and Species Being in Do Androids Dream of Electric Sheep?," published in Mosaic: a Journal for the Interdisciplinary Study of Literature 40(1): 111-126.
- 2009: Neil Easterbrook for "Giving an Account of Oneself: Ethics, Alterity, Air"
- 2010: Allison de Fren, “The Anatomical Gaze in Tomorrow’s Eve,” published in Science Fiction Studies No. 108, Vol. 36 (2), July 2009: 235-265).
- 2011: John Rieder, "On Defining SF, or Not," published in Science Fiction Studies 37.2 (July 2010)
- 2012: David M. Higgins, “Towards a Cosmopolitan Science Fiction,” American Literature 83.2 (June 2011): 331-54.
- 2013: Lysa Rivera, “Future Histories and Cyborg Labor: Reading Borderlands Science Fiction after NAFTA,” Science Fiction Studies 39.3 (November 2012): 415-36.

Honorable Mention: Hugh C. O’Connell, “Mutating toward the Future: The Convergence of Utopianism, Postcolonial SF, and the Postcontemporary Longing for Form in Amitav Ghosh’s The Calcutta Chromosome,” MFS: Modern Fiction Studies 58.4 (Winter 2012): 773-95.

- 2014: Jaak Tomberg, “On the Double Vision of Realism and SF Estrangement in Gibson’s Bigend Trilogy,” Science Fiction Studies 40.2 (July 2013): 263-85.
- 2015: Graeme MacDonald, “Improbability Drives: The Energy of SF,” Paradoxa 26: “SF Now” (2015): 111-144.
- 2016: Scott Selisker, “‘Shutter-Stop Flash-Bulb Strange’: GMOs and the Aesthetics of Scale in Paolo Bacigalupi’s The Windup Girl,” Science Fiction Studies 42.3 (November 2015): 500-18.
- 2017: Lindsay Thomas, “Forms of Duration: Preparedness, the Mars Trilogy, and the Management of Climate Change,” American Literature 88.1 (March 2016): 159-184.
- 2018: Thomas Strychacz, “The Political Economy of Potato Farming in Andy Weir’s The Martian,” Science Fiction Studies 44.1 (March 2017): 1-20.
- 2019: Jed Mayer, “The Weird Ecologies of Mary Shelley’s Frankenstein,” Science Fiction Studies 45.2 (2018): 229-43.
- 2020: Susan Ang, “Triangulating the Dyad: Seen (Orciny) Unseen,” Foundation 48.132 (2019): 5-21.

Honorable Mention: Raino Isto, “‘I Will Speak in Their Own Language’: Yugoslav Socialist Monuments and Science Fiction,” Extrapolation 60.3 (2019): 299-324.

- 2021: Jesse S. Cohn, “The Fantastic from Counterpublic to Public Imaginary: The Darkest Timeline?”, Science Fiction Studies 47.3 (2020): 448-463.

Honorable Mention: Adriana Knouf, “Xenological Temporalities in the Search for Extraterrestrial Intelligence, Lovecraft, and Transgender Experiences,” Studies in the Fantastic 9 (2020): 23-43.

- 2022: Amy Butt, “The Present as Past: Science Fiction and the Museum,” Open Library of Humanities 7.1 (2021): 1-18.

Honorable Mention: Katherine Buse, “Genesis Effects: Growing Planets in 1980s Computer Graphics,” Configurations 29 (2021): 201-230.

- 2023: Pawel Frelik, “Power Games: Towards the Rhetoric of Energy in Speculative Video Games,” Er(r)go. Teoria – Literatura – Kultura 44 (2022): 75-94.

Honorable Mention: Nora Castle, “In Vitro Meat: Contemporary Narratives of Cultured Flesh,” Extrapolation 63.2 (2022): 149-179.
