= Allison de Fren =

Allison de Fren is a writer, professor and media scholar based in Los Angeles, California. Appointed in 2010, de Fren teaches new media theory and practice at Occidental College.

Her documentary film The Mechanical Bride examines the modern-day impulse of creating artificial humanistic dolls for sex and companionship. It is narrated by Julie Newmar with music composed by Rich Ragsdale and features interviews with people who own sex-dolls, engineers who create them, artists who depict them as well as information on historical automatons and female robots portrayed in cinema. The film takes its title from the book of the same name by Marshall McLuhan.

In 2010, the Science Fiction Research Association gave her the Pioneer Award for her essay “The Anatomical Gaze in Tomorrow’s Eve.” She regularly publishes video essays on subjects related to technology, media representation and gender.

She received her doctorate from the University of Southern California School of Cinematic Arts and has been awarded fellowships from the Annenberg Foundation, Andrew W. Mellon Foundation, and the American Association of University Women.
