= Thomas D. Clareson Award for Distinguished Service =

The Thomas D. Clareson Award for Distinguished Service is presented by the Science Fiction Research Association for outstanding service activities. Particularly recognized are: promotion of SF teaching and study, editing, reviewing, editorial writing, publishing, organizing meetings, mentoring, and leadership in SF/fantasy organizations.

== Recipients ==
Previous winners include:

- 1996: Frederik Pohl
- 1997: James Gunn
- 1998: Elizabeth Anne Hull
- 1999: David G. Hartwell
- 2000: Arthur O. Lewis
- 2001: Donald "Mack" Hassler
- 2002: Joan Gordon
- 2003: Joe Sanders
- 2004: Patricia S. Warrick
- 2005: Muriel Becker
- 2006: Paul Kincaid
- 2007: Michael Levy
- 2008: Andrew Sawyer
- 2009: Hal Hall
- 2010: David Mead
- 2011: The Tiptree Motherboard (Karen Joy Fowler, Debbie Notkin, Ellen Klages, Jeanne Gomoll, Jeff Smith, and Pat Murphy)
- 2012: Arthur B. Evans
- 2013: Rob Latham
- 2014: Lisa Yaszek
- 2015: Farah Mendlesohn
- 2017: Paweł Frelik
- 2018: Veronica Hollinger
- 2019: Sherryl Vint
- 2020: Wu Yan
- 2021: Grace Dillon
- 2022: Gerry Canavan
- 2023: Shelley S. Steeby
- 2024: Jeffrey Weinstock
- 2025: Keren Omry
