= Paul Kincaid =

British science fiction critic (born 1952)

Paul Kincaid (born 22 September 1952 in Oldham, Lancashire) is a British science fiction literary critic.

== Career ==
Kincaid's writing has appeared in a wide range of publications including New Scientist, The Times Literary Supplement, Literary Review, The New York Review of Science Fiction, Foundation, Science Fiction Studies, Interzone and Strange Horizons. He is a former editor of Vector, the critical journal of the British Science Fiction Association.

He stepped down as chairman of the Arthur C. Clarke Award in April 2006 after twenty years. He was the 2006 recipient of the Thomas D. Clareson Award for outstanding service in the field of science fiction.

== Publications ==
- A Very British Genre: A Short History of British Fantasy and Science Fiction (BSFA, 1995)
- As co-editor, with Andrew M. Butler, The Arthur C. Clarke Award: A Critical Anthology (Daventry, Northants: Serendip Foundation, 2006)
- What It Is We Do When We Read Science Fiction (Harold Wood, Essex: Beccon Publications, 2008)
- Call and Response (Harold Wood, Essex: Beccon Publications, 2014)
- Iain M. Banks (University of Illinois Press, 2017)
- The Unstable Realities of Christopher Priest (SF Storyworlds, 2020)
- Brian W. Aldiss (University of Illinois Press, 2022)
- Colourfields: Writing About Writing About Science Fiction (Briardene Books, 2025). Nominated for Hugo Award for Best Related Work
