= The Stars Around Us =

- First edition
- Author: Various
- Cover artist: Gene Szafran
- Language: English
- Genre: Science fiction short stories
- Publisher: Signet Books
- Publication date: 1970
- Publication place: United States
- Media type: Print (Paperback)

The Stars Around Us is a 1970 paperback original anthology of previously published science fiction stories.

== Contents ==
- "The Stars Around Us" by Robert Hoskins
- "The Peddler's Nose" (1951) by Jack Williamson
- "The Listeners" (1968) by James E. Gunn
- "Ghost Fleet" by Christopher Anvil
- "Fondly Fahrenheit" (1954) by Alfred Bester
- "With Redfern on Capella XII" (1955) by Frederik Pohl
- "Underfollow" (1963) by John Jakes
- "The Feeling of Power" (1958) by Isaac Asimov
- "The Helping Hand" (1950) by Poul Anderson
- "A Work of Art" (1956) by James Blish
- "The Great Slow Kings" (1963) by Roger Zelazny.
