= A Work of Art =

1956 short story by James Blish

"A Work of Art" is a science fiction short story by American writer James Blish. It was first published in the July 1956 issue of Science Fiction Stories with the title "Art Work". It has often been anthologized, appearing in The Worlds of Science Fiction, The Stars Around Us and The Golden Age of Science Fiction, among others.

== Plot ==
In the year 2161, a new medical specialty has been developed, known as "Mind Sculpting." Human personalities from history are re-created and placed into voluntarily donated physical bodies. Two mind sculptors, Drs. Kris and Seirds, re-create the mind of Richard Strauss and place it in a body. After animation, the "new" Dr Strauss is encouraged to re-commence his life as a composer of music, which he does.

After some difficulty adjusting to the current techniques and theories of musical composition, which are based largely on random choices on a composition machine, Strauss searches for subjects to inspire him and composes several songs. He then comes across a play by Christopher Fry, Venus Observed, which he realises is an ideal subject for his music.

Working to a tight deadline, he completes the opera and conducts its premiere. But during the performance, he begins to suspect that something isn't quite right, and finally realises that he's used all the same musical language many times before and that he has nothing left to say musically.

The applause, when it comes, is not for him, but for the mind sculptors, and Strauss realises that it was all an experiment. Before the sculptors pronounce the formulation that will destroy the re-created mind and restore the mind of the donor – a man completely devoid of musical ability – he feels the satisfaction that the sculptors will never know that the music lacked any spark of genius: "the 'Strauss' [they] had created was as empty of genius as a hollow gourd." His final regret is that he will not now be able to set to music Personae, a poem by Ezra Pound appropriate to the occasion that he had just discovered.

== Commentary ==
In The Worlds of Science Fiction, James Blish writes:

Ostensibly this is a story about the future of serious music, but actually it proposes no novelties in that field. Its real subject is the creative process itself ... The story adopts a radical scientific assumption in order to make a philosophical and emotional point that could have been made in no other way.
