= Fiona Kelleghan =

American academic and critic (born 1965)

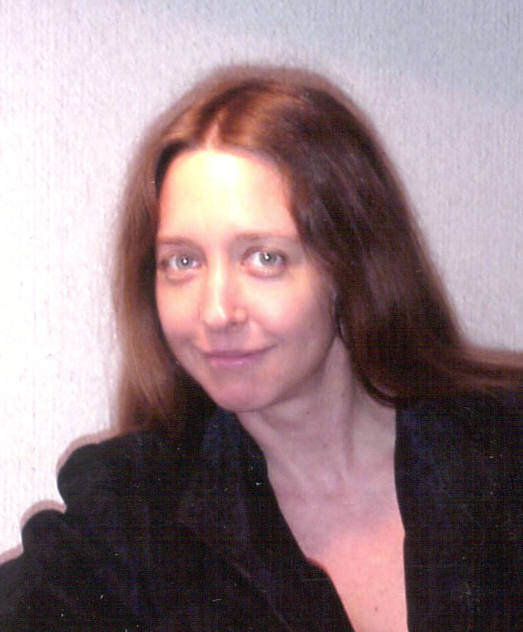
- Kelleghan in September 2002
- Born: April 21, 1965 (age 61); West Palm Beach, Florida, U.S.
- Education: University of Miami (BA and MA); Florida State University (MA)
- Occupations: Science-fiction scholar, librarian
- Parent(s): Paul Gerard Feehan and Jane Fairfax Ream Feehan Jones

Fiona Kelleghan (born April 21, 1965) is an American academic and critic specializing in science fiction and fantasy. She was a metadata librarian and a cataloguer at the University of Miami's Otto G. Richter Library. She left the university in 2011.

== Early life and education ==
Kelleghan was born April 21, 1965, in West Palm Beach, Florida, to Paul G. Feehan, a librarian and writer, and Jane Fairfax Ream Feehan, a law school financial administrator and later librarian. She is the second of three children. Her parents later relocated to Miami, where they both worked at the University of Miami. Kelleghan graduated from Miami Palmetto Senior High School in Pinecrest, Florida, and obtained a Bachelor of Arts from the University of Miami, where she majored in English. She later obtained a master's degree in library and information science from Florida State University and a Master of Arts in English from the University of Miami.

== Career ==
Writing in The Washington Post, critic Michael Dirda called Kelleghan "an expert on humor in genre fiction," and she was listed on the University of Miami's website as its official expert on "Science Fiction, Fantasy & Horror." She is also interested in film both inside and outside the science-fiction genre, and is an amateur ethologist.

She has identified a secular, satiric literary movement within the science fiction genre that she calls "Savage Humanism." Her critical anthology The Savage Humanists (Robert J. Sawyer Books, 2008) begins with a 17,000-word essay by her describing the movement and its practitioners, and collects stories by Gregory Frost, James Patrick Kelly, John Kessel, Jonathan Lethem, James Morrow, Kim Stanley Robinson, Robert J. Sawyer, Tim Sullivan, and Connie Willis, with introductions to each by Kelleghan. That essay, "A Definition of Savage Humanism, with Autobiographical Anecdotes," is reprinted as the cover story in the November 2008 edition of The New York Review of Science Fiction, and takes up most of that issue of the magazine.

Kelleghan's other books include Mike Resnick: An Annotated Bibliography and Guide to His Work (Farthest Star, 2000), and, as editor, 100 Masters of Mystery and Detective Fiction (Salem Press, 2001, 2 volumes) and Magill's Choice: Science Fiction and Fantasy Literature (Salem Press, 2002).

Her scholarly work has appeared in Extrapolation, Journal of the Fantastic in the Arts, The New York Review of Science Fiction, Nova Express, ParaDoxa: Studies in World Literary Genres, Science Fiction Studies, and SFRA Review (a publication of the Science Fiction Research Association, of which she is a member).

She has contributed to the reference books American Women Writers; Contemporary Novelists [7th Edition] (for which she is the authority on Ray Bradbury, Jonathan Lethem, and Connie Willis, among others); Magill's Guide to Science Fiction and Fantasy Literature; Fantasy and Horror: A Critical and Historical Guide to Literature, Illustration, Film, TV, Radio, and the Internet, edited by Neil Barron; St. James Guide to Crime & Mystery Writers; St. James Guide to Science Fiction Writers; Supernatural Fiction Writers: Contemporary Fantasy and Horror; and Twentieth-Century Literary Movements Dictionary; and, with Daryl F. Mallett, to Genre and Ethnic Collections: Collected Essays, and she was largely responsible for assisting Mallett and Hal Hall with the completion of Pilgrims & Pioneers: The History and Speeches of the Science Fiction Research Association Award Winners (Borgo Press, 1999). Fiona's book reviews have appeared in The Washington Post and as official commissioned reviews for BarnesandNoble.com, and she has contributed numerous plot summaries and mini-biographies to the Internet Movie Database (IMDb).

Kelleghan was a book-review editor for the Journal of the Fantastic in the Arts (since 1999) and an editorial consultant to Science Fiction Studies (since 1994). She was on the advisory board for and a contributor to The Greenwood Encyclopedia of Science Fiction and Fantasy: Themes, Works, and Wonders (edited by Gary Westfahl, Greenwood Press, 2005), and has been a judge for the William L. Crawford Fantasy Award, given by the International Association for the Fantastic in the Arts to emerging writers.

In March 2008, Kelleghan presented a paper entitled "The Intimately Human and the Grandly Cosmic: Humor and the Sublime in the Works of Robert J. Sawyer" at the 29th International Conference on the Fantastic in the Arts. In March 2009, she presented a paper entitled "Time and the Fiction of Robert J. Sawyer: Flash Forward to the End of an Era" at the 30th International Conference on the Fantastic in the Arts. In the 1990s, she had given talks at the same venue on the feeding of cats in science fiction and fantasy and on camouflage in books and films such as Toys and Predator.

Her works in progress include Alfred Bester, Grand Master: An Annotated Bibliography and further research on Savage Humanism.

Kelleghan was an Associate Professor at the University of Miami. She was on the faculty there from 1989 to 2011, and tenured since 1995. She holds an M.S. in Library and Information Science from Florida State University (1988) and an M.A. in English from the University of Miami (1996).

She is a graduate of the Clarion West science-fiction writing workshop (1995). Her short story "The Secret in the Chest: With Tests, Maps, Mysteries, & Intermittent Discussion Questions," which plays with the conventions of damsel-in-distress fairy tales, appeared in Realms of Fantasy (October 1998), and earned an Honorable Mention from editor Gardner Dozois in The Year's Best Science Fiction: 16th Annual Collection (1999).

== Publications ==
- 100 masters of mystery and detective fiction. OCLC 050898535, ISBN 0893569585
- Classics of science fiction and fantasy literature. OCLC 050923618, ISBN 1587650509
- Drinks with the Spider King. OCLC 044723977
- Mike Resnick : an annotated bibliography and guide to his work. OCLC 044751693, ISBN 1570901090
- Pilgrims and pioneers : the history and speeches of the Science Fiction Research Association Award winners. OCLC 047652196
- Science fiction, horror and the supernatural. OCLC 035011533
- The savage humanists. OCLC 230208979
- The savage humanists. Educator's guide. OCLC 315850549
