= Christopher McKitterick =

American novelist

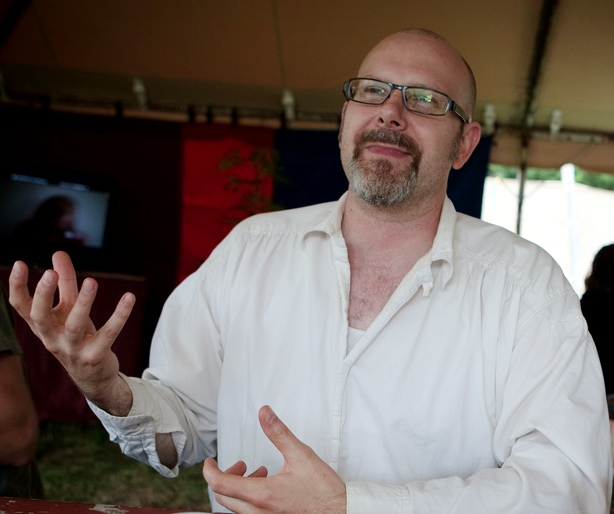
- Born: David Christopher McKitterick; July 4, 1967 (age 59); Jacksonville, Florida, U.S.
- Education: University of Minnesota; University of Wisconsin–Eau Claire (BA); University of Kansas (MA)
- Occupations: Author; editor; professor
- Website: christopher-mckitterick.com

Christopher McKitterick (born David Christopher McKitterick in 1967) is an American writer of science fiction, and a scholar, educator, and popularizer of the field.

== Life and career ==
Chris McKitterick was born on July 4, 1967, in Jacksonville, Florida. He moved extensively throughout his early childhood, to Virginia Beach, Virginia; St. Louis Park, Minnesota; Junction City, Kansas; a small village in the northern region of South Korea; Paynesville, Minnesota, settling at the age of 10 in Ortonville, Minnesota, where he finished high school in 1985. He attended the University of Minnesota in Minneapolis, but transferred to the University of Wisconsin–Eau Claire two years later, completing a BA in creative writing in 1991.

After a year teaching and writing in Peerless, Montana, McKitterick was invited in 1992 by SF scholar and writer James E. Gunn to pursue a graduate degree at the University of Kansas and assist him in running the J. Wayne and Elsie M. Gunn Center for the Study of Science Fiction, a research center specializing in science fiction scholarship and studies. McKitterick completed a Master of Arts with a creative thesis under Gunn in 1995, moving shortly afterward to Seattle, Washington. He continued to assist Gunn, while writing game materials for Wizards of the Coast and WizKids, and working as an editor, writer, and writing lead for Microsoft. He was appointed by Gunn as the director for the center in 2010. During his involvement with this, he was nominations director for the Theodore Sturgeon Award for the best short SF story of the year (1993-2015), and director and juror for the John W. Campbell Award for best SF novel of the year (between 2002 and 2020, when the award was placed on hiatus). In 2002, he returned to Lawrence to work at the University of Kansas in the English Department, leaving in 2020, after Gunn's death. In 2021 he served as director for KU's short-lived Ad Astra Center for Science and the Imagination; now he directs the nonprofit Ad Astra Institute for Science Fiction & the Speculative Imagination.

McKitterick has taught and written extensively about science fiction. He has taught science fiction writing and literature in Kansas; and for the Future Affairs Administration (FAA) in Beijing in 2019, as well as elsewhere. He has published nonfiction about SF literature and authors, including scholarly book chapters and introductions, academic journals, reference works on the field, and digital humanities, as well as articles, essays, chapters, and other nonfiction in Analog, Locus Magazine, and other media focusing on the field for academics and a popular audience. He has been a SF pundit for NPR, the New York Times, and other national presses.

Starting in 1995, McKitterick began coteaching (with James Gunn) an intensive residential workshop for writers preparing for publication in science fiction and fantasy held each summer in Lawrence, Kansas. By 2006, under McKitterick's direction, the summer program had expanded to a month-long program, including courses on writing short fiction and the novel, and the Intensive Institute on the Teaching of Science Fiction. In 2010, Gunn stepped down entirely; since then more than 300 students have taken workshops in the program from McKitterick, Kij Johnson, and guest instructors such as Pat Cadigan, John Kessel, Tina Connolly, and Andy Duncan. He has also taught courses, workshops, and master classes for universities, conventions, conferences, and other venues.

== Bibliography ==
=== Novels ===
- Transcendence (Hadley Rille Books, November 5, 2010)

=== Short fiction ===
- "Ashes of Exploding Suns, Monuments to Dust" (Analog, November/December 2018) - Winner: 2018 Analytical Laboratory (AnLab) Readers' Award for best novelette.
- "Waking the Predator" (The Hanging Garden: where fiction grows, July 19, 2016)
- "Orpheus' Engines" (Mission Tomorrow: A New Century Of Exploration, Baen Books, October 2015)
- "The Recursive Man" (Aftermaths, Hadley Rille Books, April 2012
- "Surveyor of Mars" (Westward Weird, DAW Books, February 2012)
- "The Enlightenment" (Sentinels: In Honor of Arthur C. Clarke, Hadley Rille Books, 2010)
- "The Empty Utopia" (Ruins: Extraterrestrial, Hadley Rille Books, 2007)
- "Jupiter Whispers" (Visual Journeys: A Tribute to Space Art, Hadley Rille Books, 2007)
- "The Enlightenment" (Synergy: New Science Fiction, Five Star Books, 2004)
- "Lost Dogs" (Analog, September 2001)
- "The Web" (Artemis Magazine for Artemis Project, Summer 2000)
- "City of Tomorrow" (Captain Proton, (a Star Trek book), Pocket Books, November 1999)
- "Under Observation" (Captain Proton, (a Star Trek book), Pocket Books, November 1999)
- "Worlds of Tomorrow" (Captain Proton, (a Star Trek book), Pocket Books, November 1999)
- "What Lurks in a Man's Mind" (Analog, October 1999)
- "Circles of Light and Shadow" (Analog, February 1999)
- "A Scientist's War" (E-Scape, December 1998)
- "A Plague of Mannequins" (E-Scape, October 1996)
- "The Recursive Man" (Tomorrow Speculative Fiction, April 1996)
- "Paving the Road to Armageddon" (Analog, May 1995)

=== Editing ===
- "International Science Fiction" issue and companion website, (World Literature Today, May/June 2010)
- National Space Society Return to Luna anthology, Hadley Rille Books, December 5, 2008 (editorial juror)
