= The Listeners (novel) =

1972 science fiction novel by James Gunn

- Dust jacket of the first edition
- Author: James E. Gunn
- Language: English
- Genre: Science fiction novel
- Publisher: Charles Scribner's Sons
- Publication date: 1972
- Publication place: United States
- Media type: Print (hardcover)
- Pages: 275
- ISBN: 978-0-684-13013-2
- OCLC: 533489
- Dewey Decimal: 813/.5/4
- LC Class: PZ3.G9526 Li PS3513.U797

The Listeners is a 1972 science fiction novel by American author James Gunn. It centers on the search for interstellar communication and the effect that receipt of a message has. Although the search and the message are the unifying background of the novel, the chapters explore the personal effect of these events have on the lives of the characters.

== Style ==
The Listeners is a modernist novel with a nonlinear narrative.

Linear narrative and dialogue are often interspersed with quotations from real authors and their works, fragments of fictional news reports, and snippets of thought and dialogue from named and unnamed sources (including a supercomputer). Italic type is often used. Among the more notable individuals quoted in the novel are scientist Giuseppe Cocconi, poet Kirby Congdon, Walter de la Mare, scientist Freeman Dyson, futurist and economist Herman Kahn, poet Alice Meynell, scientist and author Carl Sagan, and poet William Butler Yeats. Many quotations and some of the text are in Spanish (as the first Robert MacDonald's wife is Hispanic, and both characters speak the language). Each of the "Computer" chapters represents material the supercomputer collects in its attempts to better translate and understand the alien message it is receiving. These chapters use a historiographic approach which combines elements of futurology, literature, and science, and strongly resemble similar segments and elements in Isaac Asimov's Foundation series and A. E. van Vogt's The Voyage of the Space Beagle.

The final chapter, "Translations," translates many of the foreign language quotations into English for readers.

== Plot synopsis ==
The following synopsis is presented in chronological order, although it is not presented that way in the novel.

It is the year 2025, and many world problems (such as overpopulation, economic depression, resource depletion, racism, and crime) are on the verge of being solved. Robert MacDonald is a 47-year-old linguist and electrical engineer who is director of The Project, an attempt to listen for attempts at interstellar communication at Arecibo Observatory. For 20 years, he has been married to Maria, a Hispanic woman from Mexico. MacDonald is obsessed with his job, which places strains on his marriage. His wife, who has previously attempted suicide by taking an overdose of sleeping pills, slashes her wrists in a second attempt. Although MacDonald almost resigns to care for his wife, he does not.

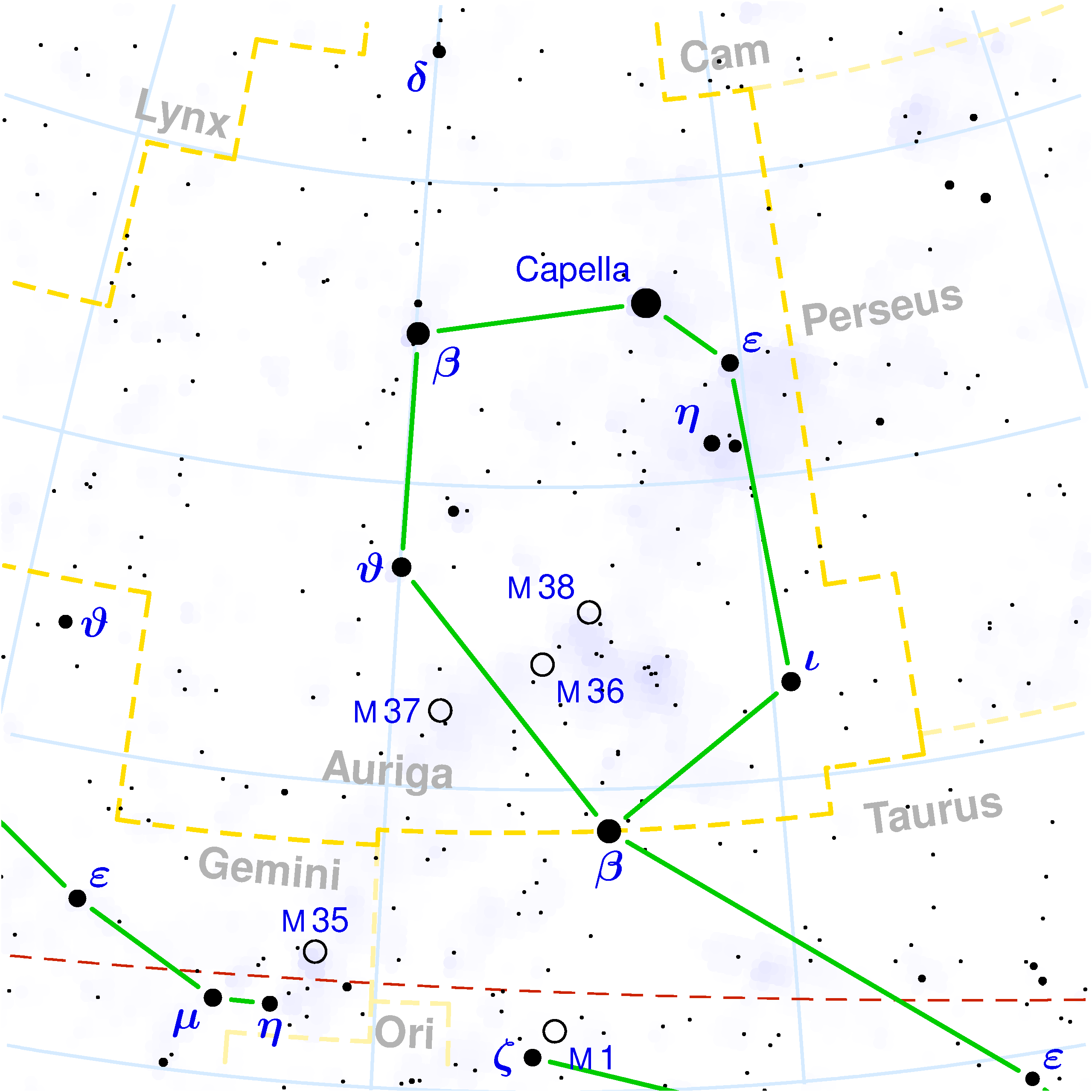
A map of the constellation Auriga, showing the star Capella.

Two years later, MacDonald and his wife have had a child, Robert MacDonald, Jr. (known as "Bobby"). MacDonald is interviewed by a journalist, George Thomas. Thomas is skeptical of The Project's cost. He also confronts MacDonald with the views of a new Christian sect, the Solitarians, led by the elderly preacher Jeremiah Jones. Jeremiah (he prefers to use only his first name) believes that humanity is alone in the universe, and that the search for extraterrestrial intelligence borders on heresy. That night, as Thomas visits the MacDonald household, The Project receives a message from the region of the star Capella in the constellation Auriga. The message is badly degraded by static, but appears to be early radio and audio-only television signals beamed back at the Earth from an alien race. MacDonald releases the news to the entire world.

The Project computer slowly begins assimilating the Capellan information, secretly becoming more Capellan-like, as humanity turns inward again and starts to learn about the dead Capellans. The story ends with the revelation that, 50 years later, another message is received from the Crab Nebula.

== Development ==
The novel is largely made up of previously published short stories which were adapted to form a coherent novel. These include:

- The "Robert MacDonald" chapters previously appeared as the short story "The Listeners" in Galaxy Magazine, September 1968.
- The chapter "George Thomas—2027" previously appeared as the short story "The Voices" in Fantasy & Science Fiction, September 1972.
- The chapter "William Mitchell—2028" previously appeared as the short story "The Message" in Galaxy Magazine, May–June 1971.
- The chapter "Andrew White—2028" previously appeared as the short story "The Answer" in Galaxy Magazine, January–February 1972.
- The chapter "The Computer—2118" previously appeared as the short story "The Reply" in Galaxy Magazine, May–June 1972.

Gunn wrote the stories which would become the book in 1966, during a sabbatical from his job as an administrative assistant to the Chancellor for University Relations at the University of Kansas. The short stories were inspired by Walter S. Sullivan's book We Are Not Alone, which documented then-nascent efforts to search for extraterrestrial intelligence (SETI) using radio telescopes. The SETI project piqued Gunn's interest: "...what stimulated my writer's instinct was the concept of a project that might have to be pursued for a century without results. What kind of need would produce that kind of dedication, I pondered, and what kind of people would it enlist—and have to enlist if it were to continue?" The story was written as a novelette, but Gunn agreed to have the chapter then called "The Listeners" published in Galaxy Magazine after editor Frederik Pohl announced the magazine was returning to a monthly publication schedule and needed a great deal of new material. This version of the story was nominated for the 1969 Nebula Award for Best Novelette. Most of the rest of the novelette was published as individual short stories over the next few months. Charles Scribner's Sons, a book publishing house, was developing a new line of science fiction novels, and an editor approached Gunn about collecting the stories and editing them together to fashion a complete novel out of the material. Gunn added the "Computer" chapters as a means of cementing the disparate chapters together and added the final chapter, "Translations," and the novel was published in hard cover in late 1972.

== Reception ==
The Listeners had a substantial impact on the field of the science fiction novel. National Aeronautics and Space Administration Chief Historian Steven J. Dick has called the novel the "classic expression" of contact with extraterrestrial life in fiction. Along with such writers as Pulitzer Prize-winner Carl Sagan, Gunn has been called one of the chief contributors to the subgenre of science fiction which deals with alien first contact. According to Gunn, scientist and author Carl Sagan told Gunn that The Listeners was the inspiration for his own novel, Contact. The Listeners was included in the anthology The Stars Around Us.

In 2010, the novel was nominated by a group of scientists and writers (assembled by New Scientist magazine) as one of the science fiction novels of the 20th century which is an unrecognized classic in the field.
