= Graduate Student Paper Award =

The Graduate Student Paper Award is presented by the Science Fiction Research Association to the outstanding scholarly essay read at the annual conference of the SFRA by a graduate student.

== Previous winners ==
Previous winners include:

- 1999 - Shelley Rodrigo Blanchard, " 'Resistance is Futile,' We Are Already Assimilated: Cyborging, Cyborg Societies, Cyborgs, and The Matrix."
- 2000 - Sonja Fritzsche, "Out of the Western Box: Rethinking Popular Cultural Categories from the Perspective of East German Science Fiction."
- 2001 - Eric Drown and Sha LaBare (tie). Drown for "Riding the Cosmic Express in the Age of Mass Production: Independent Inventors as Pulp Heroes in American SF 1926-1939" and LaBare for "Outline for a Mode Manifesto: Science Fiction, Transhumanism, and Technoscience."
- 2002 - Wendy Pearson, "Homotopia? Or What's Behind a Prefix?"
- 2003 - Sarah Canfield Fuller, "Speculating about Gendered Evolution: Bram Stoker's White Worm and the Horror of Sexual Selection."
- 2004 - Melissa Colleen Stevenson, "Single Cyborg Seeking Same: The Post-Human and the Problem of Loneliness."
- 2005 - Rebecca Janicker, "New England Narratives: Space and Place in the Narratives of H.P. Lovecraft."
- 2006 - Linda Wight, "Magic, Art, Religion, Science: Blurring the Boundaries of Science and Science Fiction in Marge Piercy's Cyborgian Narrative."
- 2007 - Joseph Brown, "Heinlein and the Cold War: Epistemology and Politics in The Puppet Masters and Double Star."
- 2008 - Unknown
- 2009 - Dave Higgins, “The Imperial Unconscious: Samuel R. Delany’s The Fall of the Towers"
- 2010 - Andrew Ferguson, “Such Delight in Bloody Slaughter: R. A. Lafferty and the Dismemberment of the Body Grotesque”
- 2011 - Bradley Fest, "Tales of Archival Crisis: Stephenson’s Reimagining of the Post-Apocalyptic Frontier," and Honorable Mention: Erin McQuiston, "Thank God It’s Friday: Threatened Frontier Masculinity in Robinson Crusoe on Mars"
- 2012 - Florian Bast, "Fantastic Voices: Octavia Butler’s First-Person Narrators and ‘The Evening and the Morning and the Night.’"
- 2013 - W. Andrew Shephard, "'Beyond the Wide World's End': Themes of Cosmopolitanism in Alfred Bester's The Stars My Destination"
- 2014 - Michael Jarvis, "'Wherever you go, there you are': Postmodern Pastiche and Oppositional Rhetoric in The Adventures of Buckaroo Banzai Across the Eighth Dimension"
- 2015 - W. Andrew Shephard, “'What is and What Should Never Be': Paracosmic Utopianism in Margaret Cavendish’s The Blazing World"
- 2016 - Dagmar Van Engen, “The Interspecies Erotic: Sex and the Nonhuman in Octavia Butler’s Xenogenesis Trilogy”
- 2017 - Francis Gene-Rowe, “You Are The Hero: Stephen Mooney’s The Cursory Epic”
- 2018 - Josh Pearson, “New Weird Frankenworlds: Speaking and Laboring Worlds in Cisco’s Internet of Everything"
- 2019 - Grant Dempsey, “Did they tell you I can Floak?’: Living Between Always and Sometimes, in China Miéville’s Embassytown.”
- 2020 - Conrad Scott, “‘Changing Landscapes’: Ecocritical Dystopianism in Contemporary Indigenous SF Literature.”
- 2021 - No award given due to COVID-19 pandemic
- 2022 - John Landreville, “‘Speculative Metabolism: Digesting the Human in Upstream Color.”
- 2023 - Josie Holland, “Constructing Radical Queer Futures and Deconstructing Noir Fiction in The Penumbra Podcast”
- 2024 - Vicky Brewster, “Simulated Worlds and Digital Disruptions: Gothic Glitch in The Tenth Girl”
