= Judith Berman =

American anthropologist and writer

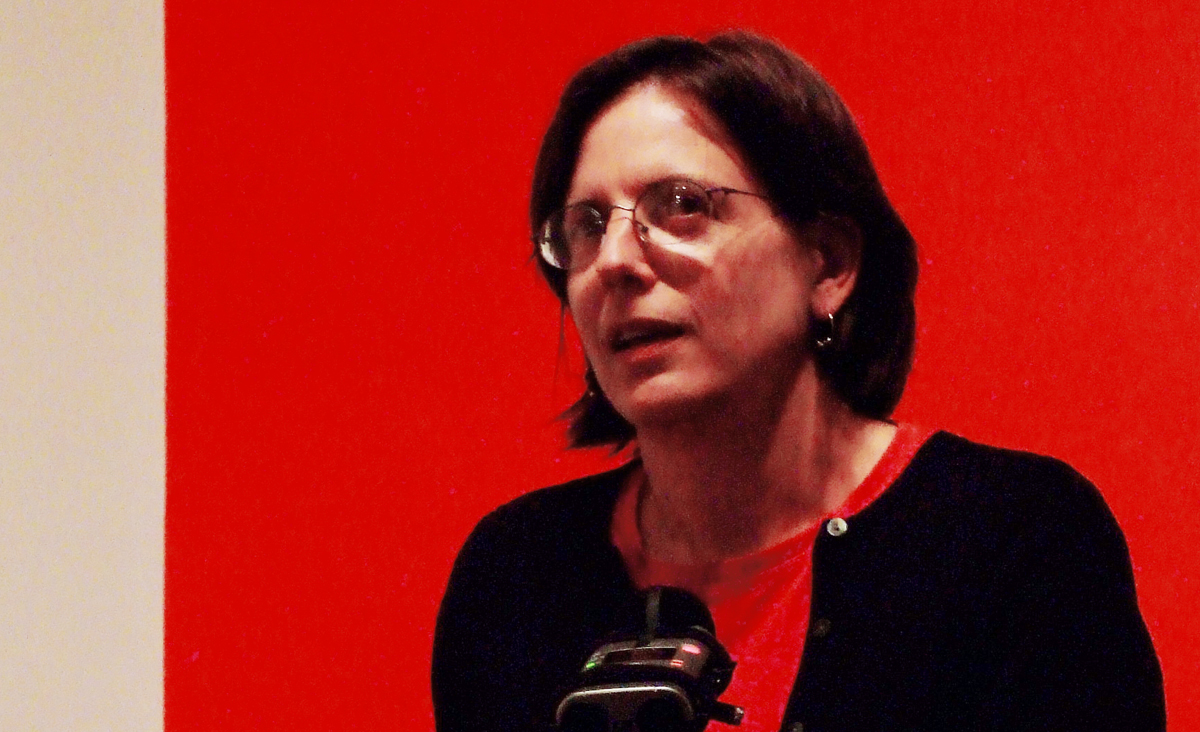
- Berman in 2008
- Born: November 12, 1958 (age 67)
- Education: Bennington College; University of Pennsylvania (PhD)
- Occupations: Anthropologist; writer
- Spouse: John Holland
- Children: 1
- Writing career
- Genres: Science fiction; fantasy

Judith Elsa Berman (born November 12, 1958) is an American anthropologist and science fiction and fantasy writer.

== Biography ==
Berman grew up in Moscow, Idaho, and read works from Golden Age science fiction during her childhood. She began writing and making up her own stories around the age of five or six.

She graduated from Bennington College in 1979, where she majored in Anthropology, Russian, and comparative literature.

After working as an editorial assistant at W.W. Norton, she received her Ph.D. in anthropology from the University of Pennsylvania in 1991. As of 2013 she lives in Victoria, British Columbia with her husband John Holland and their son Sam, born 1999.

Berman has a form of synesthesia.

== Fiction ==
Berman's fiction was short listed for the Nebula, the Sturgeon, and Crawford awards. She won a best critical length essay of its year SFRA Pioneer Award from the Science and Fiction Research Association for her 2001 essay, “Science Fiction Without the Future” Her short fiction appeared in Asimov’s, Interzone, Realms of Fantasy, and Black Gate.

Her science fiction and fantasy occasionally draws on her anthropological background, including her first novel, Bear Daughter (2005), nominated for the Crawford Award. Although about fictional characters, Bear Daughter is inspired by Native American stories and the indigenous traditions of the north Pacific coast. Berman wanted to be as true as possible to worldviews that were contained in the indigenous sources even though the story is fundamentally about her own personal concerns. In her acknowledgments, she thanks various cultures in their own language for their contribution: Gunalchéesh (Tlingit), Hàw’aa (Haida), T'ooyaksiy nisim (Nisga), T'ooyaxsiy nisim, N t'oyaxsasm, Analhzaqwnugwutla, Giáxsia, Gianakasi, Stutwinii (Nuxalk Nation), Gelakas’la (Gwa'sala people), and Tl'eekoo (Huu-ay-aht First Nations).

== Linguistic anthropology ==
Berman is trained as a linguistic anthropologist who published articles about Native American myth and translations, in particular those of the Pacific Northwest. She specializes in oral literature, ethnohistory, and history or ethnographic research on the Northwest Coast, focusing on the lives and work of indigenous ethnographers George Hunt and Louis Shotridge.

She was a research associate at the University of Pennsylvania Museum of Archaeology and Anthropology in 2005. She was adjuncts in the University of Victoria School of Environmental Studies anthropology department (2013–2016), with research interests in Northwest Coast oral literature and ethnohistory and is a Franz Boas scholar.

Berman discusses cultural appropriation in her interview with Strange Horizons.

== Works ==
=== Fiction ===
- “The Year of Storms” (1995)
- “Lord Stink” (1997)
- “The Window” (1999) (third place Sturgeon winner)
- “Dream of Rain” (2000)
- “Lord Stink and Other Stories” (chapterbook, appeared from Small Beer Press in 2002)
- “The Fear Gun” (2004) (2005 Sturgeon finalist)
- “The Poison Well” (2004)
- Bear Daughter (2005)
- "Awakening" (2008) (nominated for a Nebula Award for Best Novella)

=== Non-fiction ===
- Topics in the Clausal Syntax of German
- "The Culture as it Appears to the Indian Himself" (History of Anthropology Volume 8, Volksgeist As Method and Ethic, Essays on Boasian Ethnography and the Germ Anthropological Tradition)
