= Pilgrim Award =

The Pilgrim Award is presented by the Science Fiction Research Association for Lifetime Achievement in the field of science fiction scholarship. It was created in 1970 and was named after J. O. Bailey’s pioneering book Pilgrims Through Space and Time. The first award was presented to Bailey.

In 2019 the award was renamed SFRA Award for Lifetime Contributions to SF Scholarship.

== Recipients ==
- 1970 – J. O. Bailey (USA)
- 1971 – Marjorie Hope Nicolson (USA)
- 1972 – Julius Kagarlitski (USSR)
- 1973 – Jack Williamson (USA)
- 1974 – I. F. Clarke (UK)
- 1975 – Damon Knight (USA)
- 1976 – James E. Gunn (USA)
- 1977 – Thomas D. Clareson (USA)
- 1978 – Brian W. Aldiss (UK)
- 1979 – Darko Suvin (Canada)
- 1980 – Peter Nicholls (Australia)
- 1981 – Sam Moskowitz (USA)
- 1982 – Neil Barron (USA)
- 1983 – H. Bruce Franklin (USA)
- 1984 – Everett F. Bleiler (USA)
- 1985 – Samuel R. Delany (USA)
- 1986 – George E. Slusser (USA)
- 1987 – Gary K. Wolfe (USA)
- 1988 – Joanna Russ (USA)
- 1989 – Ursula K. Le Guin (USA)
- 1990 – Marshall Tymn (USA)
- 1991 – Pierre Versins (France)
- 1992 – Mark R. Hillegas (USA)
- 1993 – Robert Reginald (USA)
- 1994 – John Clute (UK)
- 1995 – Vivian Sobchack (USA)
- 1996 – David Ketterer (Canada)
- 1997 – Marleen Barr (USA)
- 1998 – L. Sprague de Camp (USA)
- 1999 – Brian Stableford (UK)
- 2000 – Hal W. Hall (USA)
- 2001 – David N. Samuelson (USA)
- 2002 – Mike Ashley (UK)
- 2003 – Gary Westfahl (USA)
- 2004 – Edward James (UK)
- 2005 – Gérard Klein (France)
- 2006 – Fredric Jameson (USA)
- 2007 – Algis Budrys (USA)
- 2008 – Gwyneth Jones (UK)
- 2009 – Brian Attebery (USA)
- 2010 – Eric Rabkin (USA)
- 2011 – Donna Haraway (USA)
- 2012 – Pamela Sargent (USA)
- 2013 – N. Katherine Hayles (USA)
- 2014 – Joan Gordon (USA)
- 2015 – Henry Jenkins (USA)
- 2016 – Mark Bould (UK)
- 2017 – Tom Moylan (Ireland)
- 2018 – Carl Freedman (USA)
- 2019 – John Rieder (USA)
- 2020 – Sherryl Vint (USA)
- 2021 – Veronica Hollinger (Canada)
- 2022 – Roger Luckhurst (UK)
- 2023 - Steven Shaviro (USA)
- 2024 - Lisa Yaszek (USA)
- 2025 - Takayuki Tatsumi (Japan)
