= The Feeling of Power =

1958 science fiction short story by Isaac Asimov

- Short story by Isaac Asimov
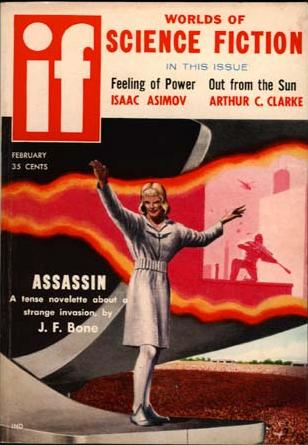
- Country: United States
- Language: English
- Genre: Science fiction

Publication
- Published in: If
- Publisher: Quinn Publishing
- Media type: Magazine
- Publication date: February 1958

"The Feeling of Power" is a science fiction short story by American writer Isaac Asimov. The story first appeared in the February 1958 issue of If: Worlds of Science Fiction, and was reprinted in the 1959 collection Nine Tomorrows, the 1969 retrospective Opus 100, the 1970 anthology The Stars Around Us, the 1986 collection Robot Dreams, the 1990 anthology "The Complete Stories (Asimov)" volume 1. In the introduction to Robot Visions, Asimov lists this story as one of the notable robot stories.

The story is representative of the genre of sci-fi that started in the 1950s as a reaction to computers, around the theme of caution against human mental atrophy in the computer era. Arthur C. Clarke's 1960 story "Into the Comet" is in a similar vein.

The story has since been cited as an early exploration of technological deskilling and human dependence on automation, themes that later became associated with calculators, GPS navigation, and artificial intelligence.

== Plot summary ==
In a distant future, humans live in a computer-dependent society and have lost fundamental mathematical knowledge, including the ability to count.

The Terrestrial Federation is at war with Deneb, and the war is conducted by long-range weapons controlled by computers which are expensive and hard to replace. Myron Aub, a low grade Technician, discovers how to reverse-engineer the principles of pencil-and-paper arithmetic by studying the workings of ancient computers which were programmed by human beings, before bootstrapping became the norm—a development which is later dubbed "Graphitics".

The discovery is demonstrated to senior programmer Shuman, who realizes the value of it. But it is appropriated by the military establishment, who use it to re-invent their understanding of mathematics. They also plan to replace their computer-operated ships with lower cost, more expendable (in their opinion) crewed ships and manned missiles, to continue the war.

Aub is so upset by the appropriation of his discovery for military purposes that he commits suicide, aiming a protein depolarizer at his head and dropping instantly and painlessly dead. As Aub's funeral proceeds, his supervisor realizes that even with Aub dead, the advancement of Graphitics is unstoppable. He executes simple multiplications in his mind without help from any machine, which gives him a great feeling of power.
