= Brian Attebery =

American novelist

- Born: December 1951 (age 74); United States
- Occupations: writer; editor; academic
- Writing career
- Notable works: Strategies of Fantasy (1992); Journal of the Fantastic in the Arts
- Notable awards: Pilgrim Award (1993); World Fantasy Award for Best Non-Professional (2021)
- Title: Emeritus professor of English and philosophy

Academic background
- Education: Brown University (PhD, 1979)

Academic work
- Institutions: Idaho State University

Brian Attebery (born December 1951) is an American writer and emeritus professor of English and philosophy at Idaho State University. He is known for his studies of fantasy literature, including The Fantasy Tradition in American Literature: From Irving to Le Guin (1980) and Strategies of Fantasy (1992) which won the Mythopoeic Award. Attebery is also editor of the Journal of the Fantastic in the Arts, for which he received the World Fantasy Award in 2021. He has also won the IAFA Award for distinguished scholarship and the Pilgrim Award for lifetime achievement.

== Biography ==
Attebery was born in December 1951, and received a doctorate in American Civilization from Brown University in 1979. He is professor of English at Idaho State University, and the editor of the Journal of the Fantastic in the Arts. He is known for his non-fiction works on fantasy literature, such as the 1980 book The Fantasy Tradition in American Literature: From Irving to Le Guin and the 1992 book Strategies of Fantasy. Attebery suggests that fantasy is a "fuzzy set" with no easily discernible boundaries, in contrast to the genre of science fiction. Critic John Clute has praised the book as displaying "very considerable [...] critical acumen".

He retired from Idaho State University in April 2022 and was named an emeritus professor in the Department of English and Philosophy.

In 2022 Brian Attebery won the Mythopoeic Award (given by the Mythopoeic Society) for his book Fantasy: How It Works (OUP).

== Recognition ==
=== Career awards ===
Attebery is the recipient of the 1993 IAFA Award for Distinguished Scholarship, and the 2009 Pilgrim Award for lifetime contribution to SF and fantasy scholarship.

Year Presented	Society	Award	Ref
1991	IAFA	IAFA Award for Distinguished Scholarship	
2009	Science Fiction Research Association	Pilgrim Award	

=== Individual works ===
He has won the Mythopoeic Award and World Fantasy Award for individual works of nonfiction, as detailed in the following table.

Year (Note: Year of award ceremony)	Work	Award	Category	Result
1993	Strategies of Fantasy	Locus Award	Non-fiction	Nominated (14th)
1993	Strategies of Fantasy	Mythopoeic Award	Scholarship	Won
1994	The Norton Book of Science Fiction	Locus Award	Anthology	Nominated (5th)
2014	Parabolas of Science Fiction (with Veronica Hollinger)	Locus Award	Non-fiction	Nominated (10th)
2015	Stories About Stories: Fantasy and the Remaking of Myth	Mythopoeic Award	Scholarship	Won
2021	Journal of the Fantastic in the Arts	World Fantasy Award	Non-professional	Won
2023	Fantasy: How It Works	Mythopoeic Award	Scholarship	Won

== Works ==
=== Short fiction ===
- "Fairest", Strange Horizons (September 11, 2006)

=== Non-fiction ===
- —— (1980). The Fantasy Tradition in American Literature: From Irving to Le Guin. ISBN 9780253356659.
- —— (1992). Strategies of Fantasy. ISBN 9780253310705.
- —— (2002). Decoding Gender in Science Fiction. ISBN 9780415939508.
- ——; Hollinger, Veronica (2013). Parabolas of Science Fiction. ISBN 9780819573681.
- —— (2014). Stories About Stories: Fantasy & the Remaking of Myth. ISBN 9780199316076.
- —— (2022). Fantasy: How It Works. ISBN 9780192856234.

=== Anthologies as editor ===
- The Norton Book of Science Fiction: North American Science Fiction, 1960–1990 (1993) editor with Ursula K. Le Guin
- Reading Narrative Fiction (1993) editor; written by Seymour Chatman
- Le Guin: Hainish Novels and Stories, Volume 1 (2017) editor, Library of America
- Le Guin: Hainish Novels and Stories, Volume 2 (2017) editor, Library of America

=== Essays ===
- Fantasy as an Anti-Utopian Mode (1986)
- Women's Coming of Age in Fantasy (1987)
- Science Fantasy and Myth (1987)
- Tolkien, Crowley, and Postmodernism (1990)
- Fantasy and the Narrative Transaction (1992)
- Godmaking in the Heartland: The Backgrounds of Orson Scott Card's American Fantasy (1992)
- Response to John Kessel's "The Brother from Another Planet" (1993)
- Letter (NYRSF, May 1993) (1993)
- Review: Peake Studies by G. Peter Wilnnington (1994)
- The 1995 James Tiptree, Jr Memorial Award Shortlist (1995) with Ellen Kushner and Pat Murphy and Susanna J. Sturgis and Lucy Sussex
- The Politics (If Any) of Fantasy (1995)
- The Closing of the Final Frontier: Science Fiction After 1960 (1995)
- Androgyny and Difference in Science Fiction (1997)
- Science Fiction and the Gender of Knowledge (2000)
- Myth and History: Molly Gloss's Wild Life and Alan Garner's Strandloper (2001)
- "But Aren't Those Just... You Know, Metaphors?": Postmodern Figuration in the Science Fiction of James Morrow and Gwyneth Jones (2002)
- The Magazine Era: 1926–1960 (2003)
- Science Fiction, Parables, and Parabolas (2005)
- High Church versus Broad Church: Christian Myth in George MacDonald and C. S. Lewis (2005)
- The Conquest of Gernsback: Leslie F. Stone and the Subversion of Science Fiction Troupes (2006)
- Special Section (Extrapolation, Spring 2009) (2009)
- C. L. Moore (1911–87) (2009)
- The Nobies' Story (2010)
- Science Fiction Parabolas: Jazz, Geometry, and Generation Starships (2013)
- The Fantastic (2014)
- Introduction: Messages from an Alternate Reality (2020)
