= Norm Nielsen =

American magician (1934–2020)

- Born: February 17, 1934; Kenosha, Wisconsin
- Died: April 21, 2020 (aged 86)
- Occupation(s): Magician, entrepreneur
- Website: Norm Nielsen Website

Norm Nielsen (February 17, 1934 – April 21, 2020) was an American magician and business owner. Born in Kenosha, Wisconsin, Nielsen was known for his original musical act.

== Early life and career ==
Nielsen's interest in magic started at a young age after watching his barber perform a few cigarette tricks. After seeing Neil Foster perform at a magic convention in White Water, Wisconsin, Nielsen enrolled at the Chavez School of Magic in Los Angeles. He graduated in 1953.

== Creation of magic tricks ==
One of his first ideas for a magic trick was to make a trumpet toot as it floated in thin air. He eventually rejected this idea as the audience would not be able to see the keys move. This led to the creation of the floating violin, whose moving bow was more readily seen. The prototype took nearly two years to develop, and the illusion itself took several more. This illusion was in Nielsen's repertoire for decades as his trademark trick.

Nielsen developed other aspects of his musical act, including a flute that disintegrates into silver dust and coins that are dropped melodically onto a vertical xylophone.

== Magic career ==
Nielsen has worked in London, Helsinki, Istanbul, Tokyo, Caracas, Santiago, Las Vegas, Sydney, and Monte Carlo. He had a regular engagement at the Crazy Horse Saloon in Paris, where he performed on and off for six years.

He was the owner of Nielsen Magic, founded in 1956. In the early years, he learned how to make magic props from Theo Bamberg, also known as Okito. He was given permission by Okito to manufacture all items of his line, including the Okito Checker Cabinet. He was the manufacturer of the Nielsen line of products, which include among others, Vanishing Bottles, Rubber Doves and Manipulation Cards.

== Awards ==
- Stage Magician of the Year – Magic Castle (1970)
- Magician of the Year – Magic Castle (1978)
- Jack Gwynne Award (1977, 1988)
- Chavez Award (1991)
- Golden Mandrake Award – Paris (1991)
- Performing Fellowship – Magic Castle (1994)
- Magician's Favorite Magician CBS-TV (1995)
- D.R.A.G.O.N Award (2005)
