= Marleen S. Barr =

American novelist (born 1953)

Marleen Barr
- Born: March 1, 1953 (age 73); New York City, U.S.
- Awards: Pilgrim Award, Science Fiction Research Association (1997)

Academic work
- Institutions: Fordham University, New York City
- Main interests: Communication and media studies, particularly science fiction studies
- Notable ideas: Feminist science fiction criticism

Marleen S. Barr (born March 1, 1953) teaches communication and media studies at Fordham University, New York City. She is notable for her significant contributions to science fiction studies, for which she won a Pilgrim Award from the Science Fiction Research Association in 1997. Her primary contributions have been her foundational work in the field of feminist science fiction criticism; her 1981 anthology Future Females: A Critical Anthology "served as an introduction and eye-opener to the field of Feminist Science Fiction."

== Biography ==
Marleen Sandra Barr was born on March 1, 1953, in New York City, New York. She attended the University of Michigan in 1975, where she received her master's degree and the University at Buffalo in 1979, receiving her PhD.

== Selected bibliography ==
=== Original criticism ===
- Alien to Femininity: Speculative Fiction and Feminist Theory (1987)
- Feminist Fabulation: Space/Postmodern Fiction (1992)
- Lost in Space: Probing Feminist Science Fiction and Beyond (1993)
- Genre Fission: A New Discourse Practice for Cultural Studies (2000)
- Creating Room For A Singularity of Our Own: Reading Sue Lange’s “We, Robots" (2013)

=== Edited works of criticism ===
- Future Females: A Critical Anthology (1981) (editor)
- Future Females, The Next Generation: New Voices and Velocities in Feminist Science Fiction Criticism (2000) (editor)
- Envisioning the Future: Science Fiction and the Next Millennium (2003) (editor)
- Reading Science Fiction (2009) (co-editor, with James Gunn and Matthew Candelaria)

=== Fiction ===
- Oy Pioneer! (novel; 2003)
- To The Moon, Said Newt Or Informing New Yorkers That Outer Space Contains Space (2012)
- Oy It's The Cosmetics, Stupid: Or How Estee Lauder Changed the Post 9/11 World (2013)
- The Birther Committee Inception: An Unreal Manhattan Real Estate Story (2013)
- The Pen Is Mightier than the Coop Board's Borg Queen: A SF/Memoir (2014)
- Rudolph The Red Nosed Squirrel or Miracle on 82nd Street: Fiction/Quotation/Exposition (2015)
- Thanksgiving Brunch Mitzvah or, the End of the World for Women (2015)
- Oy Feminist Planets (2015)
- Husband Hunting in Africa (short story, 2016)
- When Trump Changed: The Feminist Science Fiction Justice League Quashes the Orange Outrage Pussy Grabber (collection, 2018)
- This Former President: Science Fiction as Retrospective Retrorocket Jettisons Trumpism (collection, 2023)

=== Short fiction ===
- Superfeminist: or, A Hanukah Carol (2003)
- Close Encounters of the Monica Kind (2004)
- Rudolph the Red Nosed Squirrel or Miracle on 82nd Street: Fiction/Quotation/Exposition (2015)
- The Perfect Storm, or Why Americans Are No Longer Afraid of Dragons (2017)
- Duck, Donald: A Trump Exorcism (2017)
- The Purple Rose of Brooklyn, or Meeting Marshall McLuhan (with a Little Help from Mayan Apocalypse Planet X/Nibiru) (2017)
- The Trump Brand (2017)

== Awards ==
- Fulbright lectureship to the University of Düsseldorf, Germany (1983–84)
- Fulbright lectureship, University of Tübingen, Germany (1989–1990)
- Pilgrim Award for lifetime achievement in science fiction criticism (1997) Science Fiction Research Association
- Distinguished Scholar grant, Japan (2000)
- Fulbright lectureship, University of Dortmund, Germany (2006)
