= Andrew M. Butler =

British academic

Andrew M. Butler (1970-) is a British academic who teaches film, media and cultural studies at Canterbury Christ Church University. He is a former editor of Vector, the critical journal of the British Science Fiction Association, and was membership secretary of the Science Fiction Foundation. He is a former Arthur C. Clarke Award judge and is now a member of the Serendip Foundation which administers the award.

He has published widely on science fiction and, less often, fantasy, in journals such as Foundation, Science Fiction Studies, Vector and The Lion and the Unicorn. His interests include Philip K. Dick, Terry Pratchett, Jeff Noon, Iain Banks, Ken MacLeod, Christopher Priest and Philip Pullman. An article for Science Fiction Studies, "Thirteen ways of looking at the British Boom" won the SFRA Pioneer Award in 2004.

Terry Pratchett: Guilty of Literature, co-edited with Edward James and Farah Mendlesohn was nominated for a Hugo Award

== Publications ==
- Butler, Andrew M. The pocket essential Philip K. Dick / Andrew M. Butler. Harpenden : Pocket Essentials, 2000. 96 p.; 18 cm. ISBN 1-903047-29-3 (pbk.)
- Butler, Andrew M. The pocket essential cyberpunk / Andrew M. Butler. Harpenden : Pocket Essentials, 2000. 96 p.; 18 cm. ISBN 1-903047-28-5 (pbk.)
- Butler, Andrew M. The pocket essential Terry Pratchett / Andrew M. Butler. Harpenden : Pocket Essentials, 2001. 96 p.; 18 cm. ISBN 1-903047-39-0 (pbk.)
- Butler, Andrew M. Film studies / Andrew M. Butler. Harpenden : Pocket Essentials, 2005. 160 p.; 18 cm. ISBN 1-904048-43-9 (pbk.)
- Butler, Andrew M. Postmodernism / by Andrew M. Butler and Bob Ford. Harpenden : Pocket Essentials, 2003. 96 p.; 18 cm. ISBN 1-904048-24-2 (pbk.)
- Butler, Andrew M. Ontology and ethics in the writings of Philip K. Dick University of Hull, 1995.
- Butler, Andrew M., ed. Christopher Priest: The Interaction / edited by Andrew M. Butler. London: Science Fiction Foundation, 2005. 185 p.; 21 cm. ISBN 0-903007-07-X (pbk) Foundation Studies in Science Fiction; 6
- Butler, Andrew M., Sawyer, Andy and Mendlesohn, Farah, eds. A Celebration of British Science Fiction / edited by Andrew M. Butler, Andy Sawyer and Farah Mendlesohn, Guildford: Science Fiction Foundation, 2005. 156 p.; 21 cm. ISBN 0-903007-03-7 (pbk.) Foundation Studies in Science Fiction 4
- Butler, Andrew M., James, Edward and Mendlesohn, Farah, eds. Terry Pratchett: Guilty of Literature / edited by Andrew M. Butler, Edward James and Farah Mendlesohn. Baltimore, Maryland: Old Earth Books, 2004, second edition. 343 p.; 24 cm. ISBN 1-882968-32-8 (hbk.) ISBN 1-882968-31-X (pbk.)
- Butler, Andrew M. and Mendlesohn, Farah, eds. The True Knowledge of Ken MacLeod / edited by Andrew M. Butler and Farah Mendlesohn. Reading: Science Fiction Foundation, 2003. 136 p.; 21 cm. ISBN 0-903007-02-9 (hbk.) Foundation Studies in Science Fiction; 3
- Butler, Andrew M., James, Edward and Mendlesohn, Farah, eds. Terry Pratchett: Guilty of Literature / edited by Andrew M. Butler, Edward James and Farah Mendlesohn. Reading: Science Fiction Foundation, 2000. 183 p.; 21 cm. ISBN 0-903007-01-0 (pbk.) Foundation Studies in Science Fiction; 2
