= Chavez School of Magic =

The Chavez College of Magic was founded in 1941 by Ben Chavez, establishing for the first time a bona fide school of magic. In 1946 the course of study was approved by the California State Department of Education, the only school for magicians in America where veterans of World War II could study under the GI Bill of Rights. Over the years methods of teaching have been perfected and new material has been added to the curriculum. It covers billiard balls, cards, coins, thimbles and cigarettes for stage acts.

In 1961 Ben Chavez died and Marian Chavez continued to operate the school. When she died in 1978, it was her wish that Neil Foster and Dale Salwak become the co-owners of the Chavez school. Together over the next nine years, Foster and Salwak made every effort to carry on the training in the tradition established by Ben and Marian Chavez.

In 1988, Neil Foster died leaving Dale Salwak to continue teaching and managing the West Coast branch

== Magicians who visited Chavez ==
- Channing Pollock
- Norm Nielsen
- Dean Carnegie
- Ed Groves Mr. E
- Julien Magic
- Albert Ching
- Don Alan
- Eugene Lo (Gee)
- Hannah Chan
- Bond Lee
- Leons George (Leo)
