= Harold Q. Masur =

American writer

Harold Q. Masur (January 29, 1909 in New York City – September 16, 2005 in Boca Raton, Florida) was an American lawyer and author of mystery novels, most of them featuring his lawyer character, Scott Jordan, who behaved like a private eye, similar to Perry Mason.

He graduated from the New York University School of Law in 1934 and practiced law between 1935 and 1942. He then went on to join the U.S. Air Force. In the late 1940s he started writing short mystery stories for the pulps, while simultaneously beginning his career as a novelist. In 1973 he was elected President of the Mystery Writers of America.

== Works ==
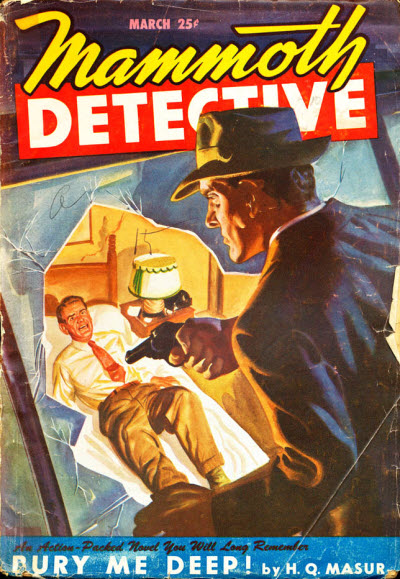
Masur's novella "Bury Me Deep" was the cover story for the March 1947 issue of Mammoth Detective

- Bury Me Deep (Scott Jordan novel; 1947)
- Suddenly A Corpse (Scott Jordan novel; 1949)
- You Can't Live Forever (Scott Jordan novel; 1951)
- So Rich, So Lovely, and So Dead (Scott Jordan novel; 1952)
- The Big Money (Scott Jordan novel; 1954)
- Our Valiant Few (1956)
- Tall, Dark & Deadly (Scott Jordan novel; 1956)
- The Last Gamble (UK Title: The Last Breath) (Also published as: Murder on Broadway) (Scott Jordan novel;1958)
- Send Another Hearse (Scott Jordan novel; 1960)
- The Name Is Jordan (collection of Scott Jordan short stories 1947–1960; 1962)
- Make a Killing (Scott Jordan novel; 1964)
- The Legacy Lenders (Scott Jordan novel; 1967)
- The Attorney (1973)
- The Broker (1981)
- The Mourning After (Scott Jordan novel; 1981)

Masur also wrote the script for The $2,000,000 Defense, an episode of Alfred Hitchcock Presents.
