= Effinger =

Effinger is a surname of German origin. Notable people with that name include:

- Cecil Effinger (1914–1990), American composer, oboist, and inventor
- George Alec Effinger (1947–2002), American science fiction author
- Virgil Effinger (1873–1955), leader of the Black Legion in the United States

Fictional characters

- Several characters in Gabriele Tergit's 1951 family saga novel Effingers

== See also ==
- Friedrich Ludwig von Effinger (1795–1867), Swiss politician
- Effingen, former municipality in Aargau, Switzerland
- Offingen, municipality in Bavaria, Germany
