= Dale Salwak =

American magician

Dale Salwak is a professional magician from California who continues to perform internationally. He is a regular performer at The Magic Castle and is known as "The Gentleman of Magic". He has been the long-time director and owner (since 1978) of the Chavez School of Magic, which was established by Ben and Marian Chavez in 1941 under the G.I. Bill. He has been featured in cover stories on numerous magic-related publications. He has also taught English literature at Citrus College in Glendora, California since 1973 and has published 25 books.

== Biography ==
Salwak was born and raised in Amherst, Massachusetts. His father worked at University of Massachusetts and his mother was a teacher and concert pianist.

He first became interested in magic at the age of five when he went to a birthday party and watched a magician perform. He was so enthralled that after the performance he stayed and asked the magician to show him how to do some of the magic tricks. When he was 10, his parents paid him $2.00 to perform at his own birthday party. It was his first magic show and he performed all the tricks that he had been practicing from his father's Ripley’s Magic for Boys book. When he was in high school at West Lafayette High School in West Lafayette, Indiana, he took the Chavez School of Magic's two-year correspondence course from 1963 to 1965. He credits Neil Foster as his key mentor.

After high school, Salwak attended Purdue University, paying his own way by performing magic at clubs, churches and “wherever I could get the work.” He moved to Los Angeles when he was 21 to pursue an English Literature degree (M.A., Ph.D.) at the University of Southern California.

Salwak has been teaching English literature at Citrus College for over 40 years. Some of his courses include Shakespeare, Literature of the Bible, English Literature and Critical Thinking.

In addition to teaching at college, he performs as an illusionist and magician at Hollywood's Magic Castle. Salwak says The Magic Castle was an important part of his career as he was able to practice his tricks in front of an audience. He has said, “Just as in vaudeville, the comics and dancers and singers had a place to be bad and learn their craft, that’s what the castle afforded the magicians – a place to learn their craft and try out things.” He often travels to perform at magicians' conventions, clubs and casinos around the world during spring breaks and summer vacations.

In 1978, Salwak and Neil Foster became the co-owners of the Chavez School of Magic after Marian Chavez died. Since Foster died in 1988, Salwak has continued to maintain the West Coast branch.

Salwak is the author of more than 25 books on religion and literature. They include Kingsley Amis: Modern Novelist (Rowman & Littlefield Publishers, 1992) and Carl Sandburg: A Reference Guide (G. K. Hall, 1988). In addition, Salwak is the editor of The Wonders of Solitude (New World Library, 1998), Anne Tyler as Novelist (University of Iowa Press, 1994), Philip Larkin: The Man and His Work (Palgrave Macmillan, 1989), and The Life and Work of Barbara Pym (Palgrave Macmillan, 1987). His book, Teaching Life: Letters from a Life in Literature (University of Iowa Press, 2008), is based on his experience and memories as a teacher and was inspired by the death of one of his students in a car accident on her way to his office. About this memoir, Kenneth Silverman wrote, "Teaching Life is a fascinating blend of practical advice on teaching, moral inquiry, and personal experience. Its focus moves from the obligation to return exams promptly, to Christianity and Judaism, to Kingsley Amis, to experiencing a parent's death. The unusual range of subjects makes Salwak's book by turns instructive, inspiring, and poignant." Writers and Their Mothers, a collection of biographical and autobiographical essays by other writers, which Salwak edited, was published in 2018 by Palgrave Macmillan to coincide with the U.K.'s celebration of Mother's Day. In 2023 he published The Life of the Author: Nathaniel Hawthorne (John C. Wiley & Sons) and Writers and Their Teachers (Bloomsbury). He is also a regular contributor to the (London) Times Education Magazine as well as the (London) Times Educational Supplement.

In 2009, Salwak was invited by the North Korean government and former leader Kim Jong-il, to perform at the country's 26th Spring Friendship Festival. He was the first and only American who was asked among 680 worldwide performers, musicians, and entertainers. Since then, he has been there three times, in 2011 and 2012, and has performed at the Pyongyang Circus Theater. He has also traveled to Europe, Australia, South America, Latin America, and China 11 times.

He currently resides in La Verne, California. His daughter, Ryann Salwak, is also training to be a magician.

== Awards and honors ==
Salwak has received numerous honors including Purdue University's Distinguished Alumni Award, a National Endowment for the Humanities grant, and a National Defense Education Act fellowship from the University of Southern California.
