= James E. Gunn =

American science fiction author (1923–2020)

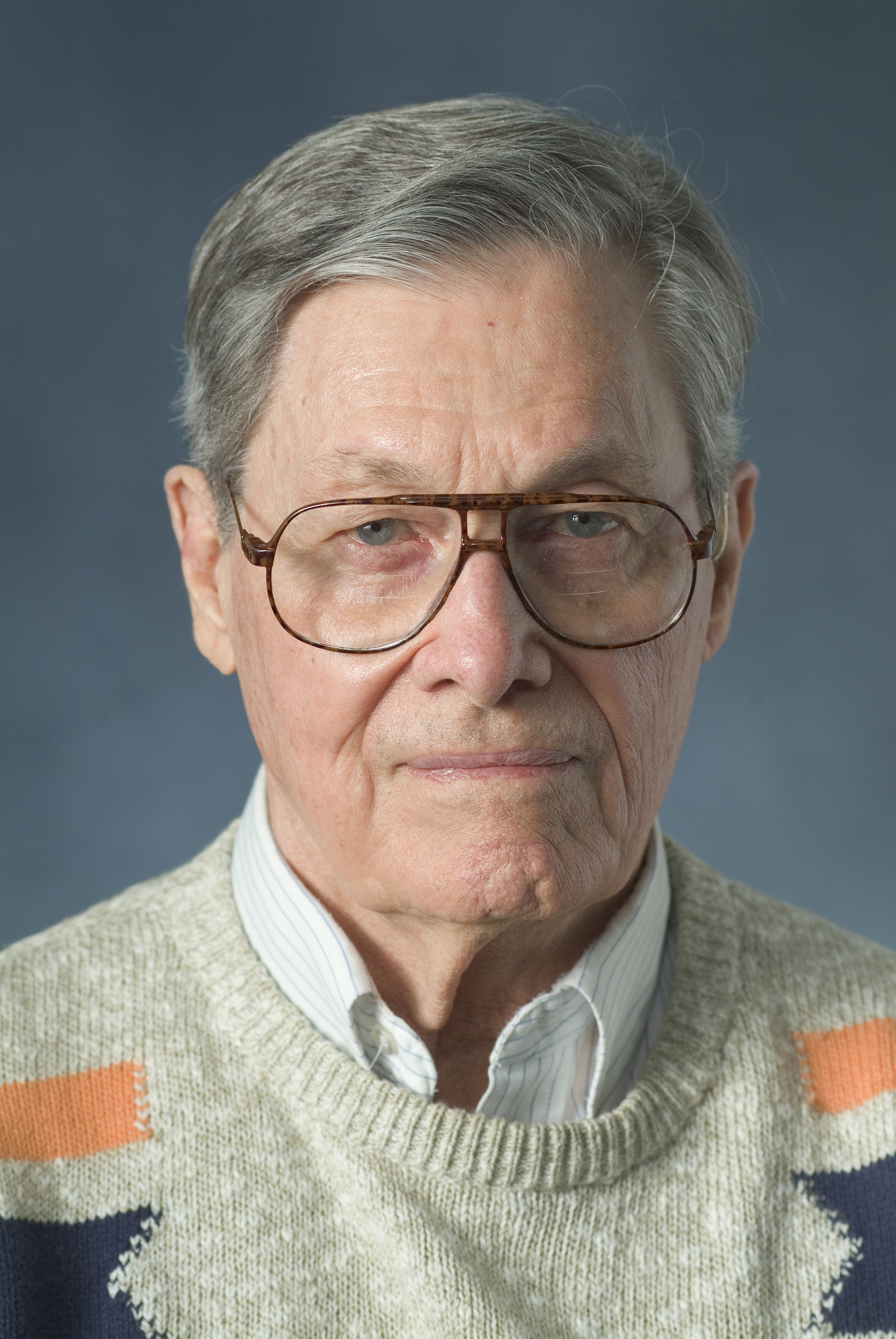
- Gunn in 2005
- Born: James Edwin Gunn; July 12, 1923; Kansas City, Missouri, U.S.
- Died: December 23, 2020 (aged 97); Lawrence, Kansas, U.S.
- Education: University of Kansas (BS, MA)
- Occupations: Author; academic
- Writing career
- Pen name: Edwin James
- Language: English
- Period: 1948–2020
- Genre: Science fiction
- Subjects: Isaac Asimov, history of science fiction
- Notable works: The Road to Science Fiction; Isaac Asimov; The New Encyclopedia of Science Fiction; The Immortals
- Notable awards: (below)

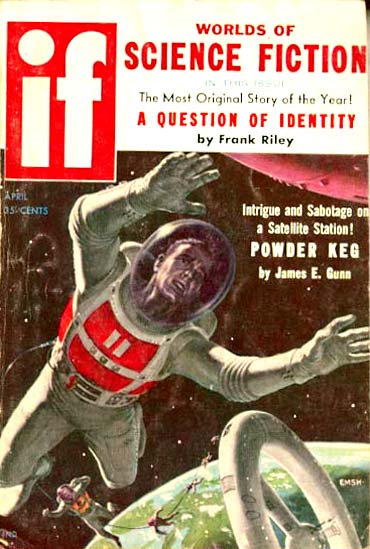
Gunn's novelette "Powder Keg" was the cover story for the April 1958 issue of If

James Edwin Gunn (July 12, 1923 – December 23, 2020) was an American science fiction writer, editor, scholar, and anthologist. His work as an editor of anthologies includes the six-volume Road to Science Fiction series. He won the Hugo Award for "Best Related Work" in 1983 for a book about author Isaac Asimov, and he won or was nominated for several other awards for his non-fiction works in the field of science fiction studies. The Science Fiction and Fantasy Writers of America made him its 24th Grand Master in 2007, and he was inducted by the Science Fiction and Fantasy Hall of Fame in 2015. His novel The Immortals was adapted into a 1970–71 TV series starring Christopher George.

Gunn was a professor emeritus of English and the founding director of the Center for the Study of Science Fiction, both at the University of Kansas.

== Early life, family and education ==
Gunn was born in Kansas City, Missouri, on July 12, 1923, to Jesse and Elsie Mae (née Hutchison) Gunn. He came from a publishing family: his father was a printer, two uncles were pressmen, another uncle was a proofreader, and his grandfather was a newspaper editor. His grandfather, Benjamin Gunn, appeared in Ripley's Believe it or Not. As a Masonic representative, he had visited every county in every state in the country and could name them all, including where he had spent the night.

Gunn served for three years in the U.S. Navy during World War II but never saw combat. With several months of Japanese language training and a few hours spent learning to fly an airplane, he was sent to Truk Island, now known as Chuuk Lagoon, to be adjutant to the commanding officer. He then attended the University of Kansas, earning a Bachelor of Science in journalism in 1947 and a Masters of Arts in English from Northwestern University in 1951.

== Career ==
By 1958, Gunn was managing editor of University of Kansas Alumni Publications. He became a faculty member of the university, where he served as the director of public relations and as a professor of English, specializing in science fiction and fiction writing. He was a professor emeritus and founding director of the original Center for the Study of Science Fiction, which awarded the annual John W. Campbell Memorial Award for best novel and the Theodore Sturgeon Memorial Award for best short fiction.

He served as President of the Science Fiction Writers of America from 1971 to 1972 and was President of the Science Fiction Research Association from 1980 to 1982. SFWA honored him as a Grand Master of Science Fiction in 2007.

On June 12, 2015, Locus announced the selection of Gunn and four others for induction into the Science Fiction and Fantasy Hall of Fame, along with "a 'lightning-fast' fundraiser to cover [Gunn's] travel expenses so he can attend the June 27, 2015 induction ceremony in Seattle".

=== Writing ===
Gunn became a professional writer in 1947 when he wrote a play produced by the University of Kansas, Thy Kingdom Come, then wrote newspaper articles and radio scripts. Although he considered moving to New York to become a playwright, he began his career as a science fiction writer in 1949, making his first short story sale to Thrilling Wonder Stories. He has had nearly 100 stories published in magazines and anthologies and has written 28 books and edited 10. Many of his stories and books have been reprinted around the world.

In 1948, Gunn wrote his first science fiction, ten short stories, and published nine from 1949 to 1952 as "Edwin James", a pseudonym derived from his full name James Edwin Gunn. The first two in print, "Communications" and "Paradox" (the first sale), were published in September and October 1949 by editor Sam Merwin in Startling Stories and Thrilling Wonder Stories respectively. Gunn's master's thesis, a critical analysis of the genre, was also published in a professional magazine. His novels were first published by Gnome Press in 1955, Star Bridge, written by Gunn and Jack Williamson, and This Fortress World.

Scribner's published Gunn's novel The Listeners in 1972 and it was runner-up for the first annual John W. Campbell Memorial Award for Best Science Fiction Novel. Carl Sagan called it "one of the very best fictional portrayals of contact with extraterrestrial intelligence ever written." According to the publisher of a 2004 edition, "this book predicted and inspired the creation of the Search for Extraterrestrial Intelligence (SETI)—the organization dedicated to the search for extraterrestrial life."

In 1996, Gunn wrote a Star Trek novel that was a novelization of "The Joy Machine", an unproduced episode of the first Star Trek series that was scripted by Theodore Sturgeon.

== Personal life and death ==
Gunn married Jane Frances Anderson on February 6, 1947, at Danforth Chapel in Lawrence, Kansas. They had two sons, Christopher, born in 1949, and Kevin, born in 1954. Christopher died on St. Patrick's Day, 2005. Jane died September 27, 2012. They were survived by Kevin.

Gunn died in Lawrence, Kansas, on the morning of December 23, 2020, at age 97 of natural causes after a brief hospitalization.

== Adaptations ==
His stories also have been adapted into radio plays and teleplays.

- NBC Radio's X Minus One – "Cave of Night", February 1, 1956; "Wherever You May Be", June 26, 1956
- Desilu Playhouse's 1959 "Man in Orbit", based on Gunn's "The Cave of Night"
- ABC-TV's Movie of the Week "The Immortal" (1969) and an hour-long television series The Immortal in 1970, based on Gunn's The Immortals
- "Psychodynamics of the Witchcraft", an episode of the USSR science fiction TV series This Fantastic World (filmed in 1989) was based on Gunn's 1953 story "Wherever You May Be".
- Mystery drama If the bride is a witch (Russia, 2002) was based on "Wherever You May Be".

== Bibliography ==
A more-complete bibliography of Gunn's works is available on Christopher McKitterick's site (maintained since 1992; McKitterick worked closely with Gunn and his SF center from 1992 until his death in 2020, and wrote extensively on Gunn, his original Center for the Study of Science Fiction, and his work).

=== Novels ===
- Star Bridge, Gunn and Jack Williamson (Gnome Press, 1955)
- This Fortress World (Gnome, 1955)
- The Joy Makers (Bantam, 1961)
- The Immortals (Bantam, 1962), which was adapted for an ABC Movie of the Week in the fall of 1969 and turned into an ironically short-lived TV series in 1970.
- The Listeners (Scribner's, 1972), stories – October 1972 collection of six novelettes, five previously published (September 1968 to September 1972); "The 'Computer Run's between each story average 8 pages long"
- The Magicians (Scribner's, 1976) – expanded from a novella, "Sine of the Magus" (Beyond Fantasy Fiction, May 1954)
- Kampus (Bantam, 1977)
- The Dreamers (Simon & Schuster, 1981)
- Crisis! (Tor Books, 1986) – fix-up of six stories published 1978 to 1985
- The Joy Machine (Star Trek, Book 80) (1996)
- The Millennium Blues (e-reads.com, 2000; Easton Press, 2001)
- Human Voices (Five Star Books, 2002)
- Gift from the Stars (Easton, 2005)
- Transcendental (Transcendental Machine #1) ISBN 9780765335012 (Tor, 2013)
- Transgalactic (Transcendental Machine #2) ISBN 9780765380920 (Tor, 2016)
- Transformation (Transcendental Machine #3) ISBN 9780765386663 (Tor, June 2017)

=== Short fiction ===
Collections

- Station in Space (Bantam Books, 1958)
- Future Imperfect (Bantam, 1964)
- The Immortals (Bantam, 1964), four stories; revised and expanded ed. comprising five stories, Pocket Books, 2004
- The Witching Hour (Dell, 1970)
- Breaking Point (Walker & Co., 1972)
- The Burning (Dell, 1972)
- Some Dreams Are Nightmares (Scribner's, 1974)
- The End of the Dreams (Scribner's, 1975)

Anthologies (editor)

- Nebula Award Stories 10 (Gollancz, 1975)

Gunn's other anthologies include The Road to Science Fiction, six volumes from 1977 to 1998. The first four volumes, published by Mentor New American Library from 1977 to 1982, are organized chronologically and cover Gilgamesh to 1981 or "Forever" (volume 4, From Here to Forever). The last two volumes, published by White Wolf, Inc. in 1998, feature "The British Way" and "Around the World".

=== Nonfiction ===
- Alternate Worlds: The Illustrated History of Science Fiction (Prentice-Hall, 1975), ISBN 0-89104-049-8 – winner of the Locus Award and a Worldcon Special Achievement Award from MidAmeriCon, the 34th World Science Fiction Convention in 1976
- Isaac Asimov: The Foundations of Science Fiction (Oxford, 1982); revised ed. (Scarecrow Press, 1996), ISBN 0-8108-3129-5 – Hugo Award winner
- The New Encyclopedia of Science Fiction, editor (Viking Press, 1988), 067081041X – Hugo finalist
- The Science of Science-Fiction Writing (Scarecrow Press, 2000), ISBN 1578860113 – "reflects on the science fiction process and how to teach it"
- Speculations on Speculation: Theories of Science Fiction, by Matthew Candelaria and Gunn (Scarecrow Press, 2005)
- Inside Science Fiction (Scarecrow Press, 2006)
- Reading Science Fiction, by Gunn, Marleen S. Barr, and Matthew Candelaria (Palgrave Macmillan, 2008)
- Gunn, James (July–August 2011). "Science fiction imagines the digital future". Analog Science Fiction and Fact. 131 (7&8): 98–103.
- — (2013). Paratexts : introductions to science fiction and fantasy. Lanham, Md.: The Scarecrow Press.
- Star-Begotten: A Life Lived in Science Fiction (McFarland and Company, Inc., 2017)
- Modern Science Fiction: A Critical Analysis: The Seminal 1951 Thesis, with a New Introduction and Commentary (McFarland and Company, Inc., 2018)

———————

Bibliography notes

== Awards ==
- 1976 Science Fiction Research Association Pilgrim Award for lifetime achievement in science fiction scholarship
- 1976 Worldcon Special Award for Alternate Worlds: The Illustrated History of Science Fiction
- 1976 Locus Award for Associational Item, Alternate Worlds: The Illustrated History of Science Fiction
- 1983 Hugo Award for Best Non-Fiction Book, Isaac Asimov: The Foundations of Science Fiction
- 2007 Damon Knight Memorial Grand Master Award for lifetime achievement in science fiction and fantasy
- 2015 Inducted into the Science Fiction and Fantasy Hall of Fame

Gunn's 1972 novel The Listeners was runner-up for the 1973 Campbell Memorial Award.

== Sources ==
- Tuck, Donald H. (1974). The Encyclopedia of Science Fiction and Fantasy. Chicago: Advent. p. 195. ISBN 0-911682-20-1.
