= Lisa Yaszek =

American professor of science fiction film

Lisa Yaszek is an American academic in the field of science fiction literature, particularly the history and cultural implications of the genre and underrepresented groups in science fiction, including women and people of color. She is a Regents professor in the School of Literature, Media, and Communication at the Georgia Institute of Technology.

== Education ==
In 1991, Yaszek received her bachelor's in English from the University of Michigan-Ann Arbor and graduated magna cum laude. She went on to receive her master's in 1992 and PhD in 1999, both from the University of Wisconsin-Madison.

== Career ==
Yaszek has focused her work on examining the genre of science fiction in literature. She has had several books published covering a variety of literary topics. However, she is especially focused on the role that women and people of color play in the science fiction world. Her books The Future is Female: Early Classics of Women’s Science Fiction from the Pulp Era to the New Wave and Sisters of Tomorrow: The First Women of Science Fiction both discuss the underrepresentation of women in this genre. She is specifically concerned with the lost voices of such women, and unearthing the historical contributions they have provided. As writer Ursula Le Guin stated of The Future is Female, “Lisa Yaszek has selected the best of this tradition, by recognized masters as well as lesser-known names who are overdue for rediscovery.” Yaszek devotes her research to understanding the history of the genre as well as contextualizing its development. In 2017, she was honored for her work in this area with the PCA/ACA Susan Koppelman Award for Best Anthology, Multi-authored, or Edited Book in Feminist Studies.

Yaszek has been featured in numerous publications and media outlets discussing the importance of the science fiction genre in media. She has written articles for such outlets as The Washington Post, Food and Wine Magazine, and USA Today. She was also featured in the 2018 AMC miniseries James Cameron’s Story of Science Fiction that explores the genre "from its cult beginnings in pulp to the engine for blockbuster film" it has become in modern times.

During 2009-2010 Yaszek was president of the Science Fiction Research Association. Since 2016, Yaszek is a juror for the John W. Campbell Memorial Award for Best Science Fiction Novel. Also since 2016 - the award's inception - she's been on the three-person jury for the Eugie Foster Memorial Award for Short Fiction. She has served on numerous boards and organizations.

=== Recognition ===
- PCA/ACA Susan Koppelman Award for Best Anthology, Multi-authored, or Edited Book in Feminist Studies, 2017
- Science Fiction Research Association Clareson Award for Distinguished Service, 2014
- Science Fiction Research Association Mary Kay Bray Writing Award, 2014
- Ivan Allen Jr. Legacy Award for Research, Teaching and Service, 2013
- Science Fiction Research Association Pioneer Writing Award, 2005

== Selected works ==
- Yaszek, Lisa. The Future Is Female! Vol. 2: The 1970s: More Classic Science Fiction Stories by Women. Library of America, 2022.
- Yaszek, Lisa. Literary Afrofuturism in the Twenty-First Century. Ohio State University Press, 2020.
- Yaszek, Lisa. The Future Is Female! 25 Classic Science Fiction Stories by Women, from Pulp Pioneers to Ursula K. Le Guin: A Library of America Special Publication. Library of America, 2018.
- Yaszek, Lisa and Patrick Sharp. Sisters of Tomorrow: The First Women of Science Fiction (Early Classics Of Science Fiction). Wesleyan University Press, 2016.
- Yaszek, Lisa. Galactic Suburbia: Recovering Women’s Science Fiction. Ohio State University Press, 2008.
- Yaszek, Lisa. The Self Wired: Technology and Subjectivity in Contemporary Narrative (Literary Criticism and Cultural Theory). Routledge, 2002.
