= Utopian studies =

Field of study

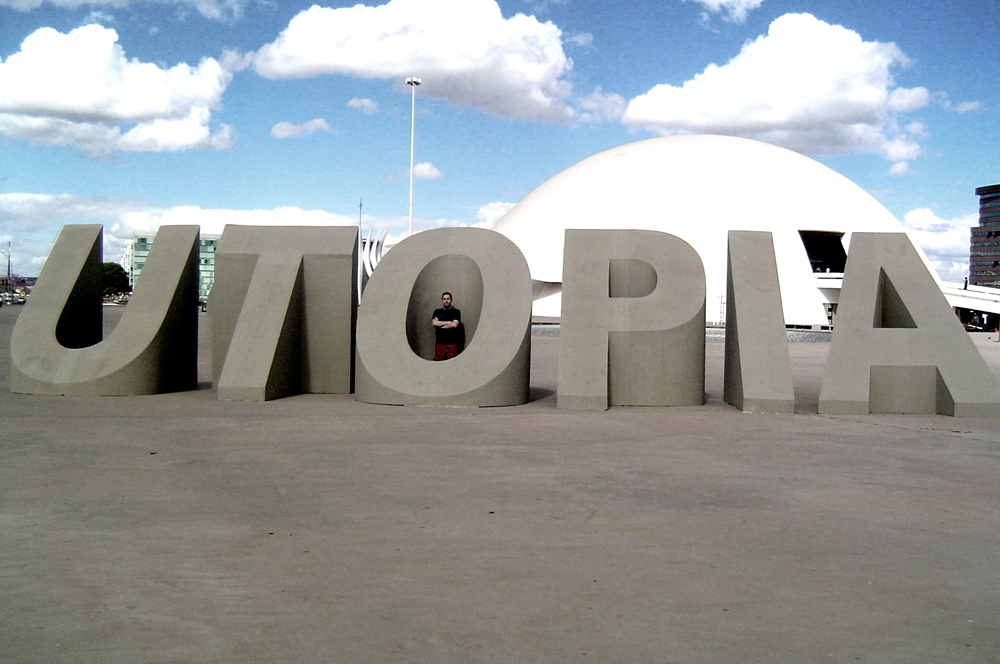
A "Utopia" sign in Brazil

Utopian studies is an interdisciplinary field of study that researches utopianism in all its forms, including utopian politics, utopian literature and art, utopian theory, and intentional communities. In his 1516 book Utopia, Sir Thomas More coined the term. Utopian studies can be subdivided into three major areas: study of utopian works, communitarianism and utopian social theory. A study opposite to Utopian studies is Dystopian studies. While Utopias are non-existent societies people dream of, dystopias are essentially non-existent and non-desirable societies that individuals deem worse than their present society. They are also known as negative utopias.

== History ==
Denis Vairasse is mentioned among the earliest scholars in this field. His History of the Sevarambians contains one of the first thoughts on theoretical reflection on the concept of utopia: "Those who have read Plato's Republic or the Utopia of Thomas More or Chancellor Bacon's New Atlantis, which are in fact nothing more than the ingenious inventions ["imaginations"] of these authors, may think perhaps that this account of newly discovered countries, with all their marvels, is of a similar type ["sont de ce genre"]."

As a part of the counterculture of the 1960s, there was a revival of utopian works. The Society for Utopian Studies was founded in 1975 and the Utopian Studies Society was founded in 1988.

== Significant utopian studies scholars (in roughly chronological order) ==
- Philosopher Herbert Marcuse
- Sociologist Karl Mannheim
- Philosopher Ernst Bloch
- Sociologist Krishnan Kumar
- Cultural critic Raymond Williams
- Literary critic Darko Suvin
- Political scientist Lyman Tower Sargent
- Political scientist Gregory Claeys
- Sociologist Erik Olin Wright
- Sociologist Ruth Levitas
- Literary critic Tom Moylan
- Literary critic Fredric Jameson
- Lucy Sargisson
- Vincent Geoghegan
- Raffaella Baccolini

== Principal research institutions, journals, conferences, societies, awards ==
Research institutions:

| Name | Location | Ref |
|---|---|---|
| Ralahine Centre for Utopian Studies | University of Limerick | |
| Department of Modern Languages, Literatures and Cultures | University of Bologna | |
| Interdepartmental Center for Utopian Studies | University of Lecce | |

Societies:

- Society for Utopian Studies (North America, founded 1975)
- Utopian Studies Society (Europe, founded 1988)

Journals:

- Utopian Studies (founded 1987)

Conferences:

- Society for Utopian Studies, annual
- Utopian Studies Society, annual

Awards:

- The Lyman Tower Sargent Distinguished Scholar Award, made by the Society for Utopian Studies.

== Significant works ==
| Authors/Editors | Description | Year |
|---|---|---|
| Ernst Bloch | The Principle of Hope. 3 Vols. Trans. Neville Plaice, Stephen Plaice, Paul Knight. Oxford: Blackwell | 1986 [1937-41] |
| Gregory Claeys and Lyman Tower Sargent (eds) | The Utopia Reader. New York: New York University Press | 1999 |
| Gregory Claeys (ed.) | The Cambridge Companion to utopian Literature. Cambridge: Cambridge University Press | 2010 |
| Ana Cecilia Dinerstein | The Politics of Autonomy in Latin America. Palgrave Macmillan | 2015 |
| Vincent Geoghegan | Utopianism and Marxism. London: Methuen | 1987 |
| Fredric Jameson | Archaeologies of the Future: The Desire Called Utopia and Other Science Fictions. London: Verso | 2005 |
| Krishnan Kumar | Utopia and Anti-utopia in Modern Times. Oxford: Blackwell | 1987 |
| Krishnan Kumar | Utopianism. Milton Keynes: Open University Press | 1991 |
| Ruth Levitas | The Concept of Utopia. London: Allan | 1990 |
| Karl Mannheim | Ideology and Utopia: an Introduction to the Sociology of Knowledge. Trans. Louis Wirth and Edward Shils. London: Routledge | 1936 [1929] |
| Tom Moylan | Demand the Impossible: Science Fiction and the Utopian Imagination. London: Methuen | 1986 |
| Tom Moylan | Scraps of the Untainted Sky: Science Fiction, Utopia, Dystopia. Boulder and Oxford: Westview Press | 2000 |
| Tom Moylan and Rafaella Baccolini (eds.) | Utopia-Method-Vision: The Use Value of Social Dreaming. Oxford and Bern: Peter Lang | 2007 |
| Peter Y. Paik | From Utopia to Apocalypse: Science Fiction and the Politics of Catastrophe. Minneapolis: U of Minnesota P | 2010 |
| Lyman Tower Sargent | British and American Utopian Literature 1516-1985: An Annotated, Chronological Bibliography. New York: Garland | 1988 |
| Lyman Tower Sargent | Utopianism: A Very Short Introduction. Oxford: Oxford University Press | 2010 |
| Lucy Sargisson | Contemporary Feminist Utopianism. London: Routledge | 1996 |
| Lucy Sargisson and Lyman Tower Sargent | Living in Utopia: New Zealand's Intentional Communities. Aldershot: Ashgate | 2004 |
| Darko Suvin | Metamorphoses of Science Fiction: On the Poetics and History of a Literary Genre. New Haven: Yale University Press | 1979 |
| Darko Suvin | Defined by a Hollow: Essays on Utopia, Science Fiction and Political Epistemology. Frankfurt am Main, Oxford and Bern: Peter Lang | 2010 |
| Raymond Williams | Tenses of Imagination: Raymond Williams on Science Fiction, Utopia and Dystopia. Ed. Andrew Milner. Frankfurt am Main, Oxford and Bern: Peter Lang | 2010 |
