= Science fiction studies =

Academic discipline

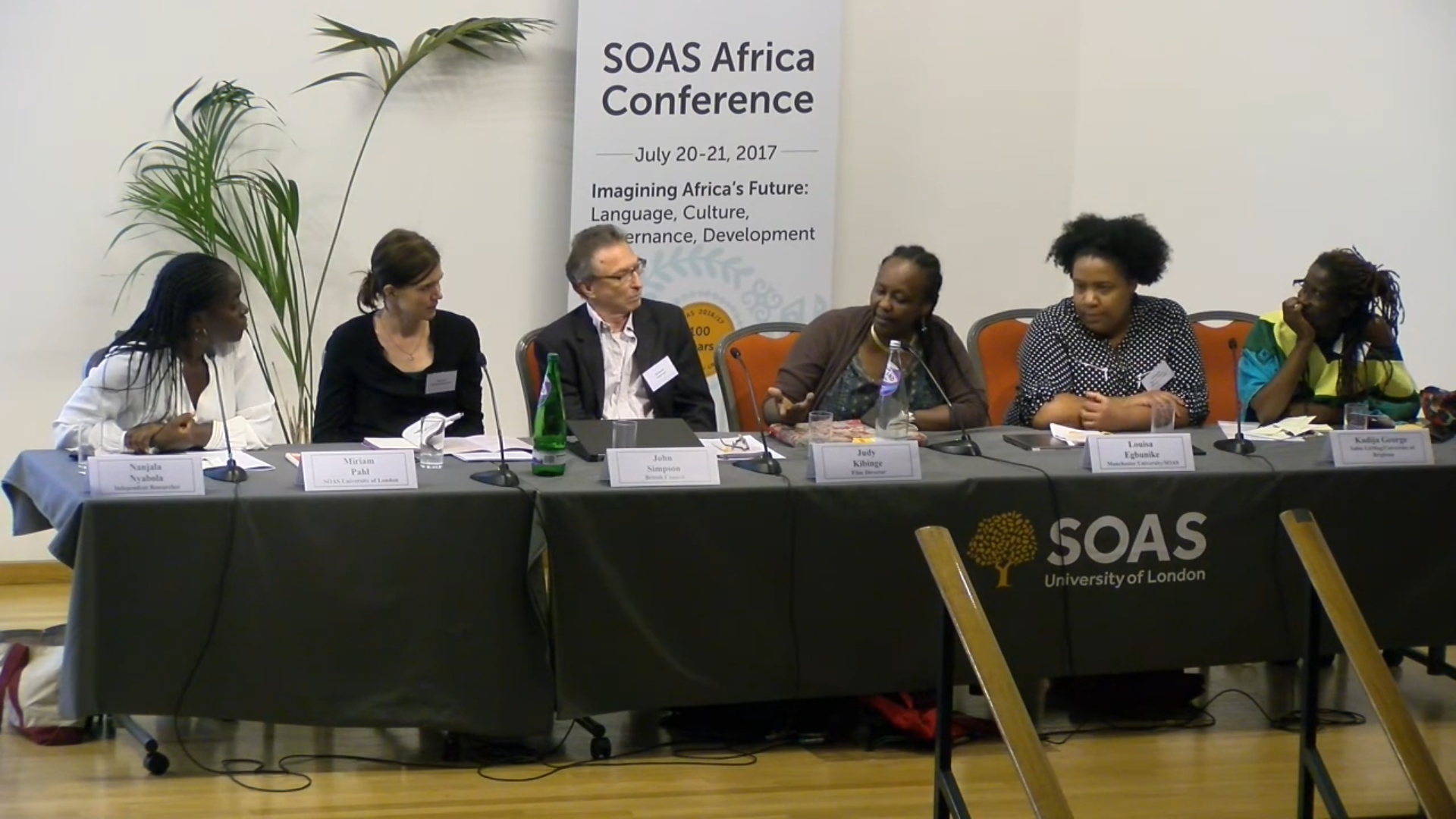
Conferences are an important way for scholars to discuss ideas. In this photo, panelists discuss science fiction at the SOAS Africa Conference in 2017, which had the tagline "New visions, new images, new stories."

Science fiction studies is the common name for the academic discipline that studies and researches the history, culture, and works of science fiction and, more broadly, speculative fiction.

The modern field of science fiction studies is closely related to popular culture studies, a subdiscipline of cultural studies, and film and literature studies. Because of the ties with futurism and utopian works, there is often overlap with these fields as well. The field also has spawned subfields, such as feminist science fiction studies.

== History ==
As the pulp era progressed, shifting science fiction ever further into popular culture, groups of writers, editors, publishers, and fans (often scientists, academics, and scholars of other fields) systematically organized publishing enterprises, conferences, and other insignia of an academic discipline. Much discussion about science fiction took place in the letter columns of early SF magazines and fanzines, and the first book of commentary on science fiction in the US was Clyde F. Beck's Hammer and Tongs, a chapbook of essays originally published in a fanzine.

The 1940s saw the appearance of three full-scale scholarly works that treated science fiction and its literary ancestors: Philip Babcock Gove's The Imaginary Voyage in Prose Fiction (1941), J. O. Bailey's Pilgrims Through Space and Time (1948), and Marjorie Hope Nicolson's Voyages to the Moon (1949).

Peter Nicholls credits Sam Moskowitz with teaching "what was almost certainly the first sf course in the USA to be given through a college": a non-credit course in "Science Fiction Writing" at City College of New York in 1953. The first regular, for-credit courses were taught by Mark Hillegas (at Colgate) and H. Bruce Franklin (at Stanford) in 1961. During the 1960s, more science fiction scholars began to move into the academy, founding academic journals devoted to the exploration of the literature and works of science fiction. The explosion of film studies and cultural studies more broadly granted the nascent discipline additional credibility, and throughout the 1970s and 1980s, mainstream scholars such as Susan Sontag turned their critical attention to science fiction.

In 1982, James Gunn established his original Center for the Study of Science Fiction as a Kansas Board of Regents Center as an umbrella for the SF programs he offered beginning in 1969. Along with Jack Williamson's in Arizona, his were the first SF courses offered at a major university.

The 1990s saw the first academic programs and degree-granting programs established, and the field shows continued steady growth.

== Degree-granting programs ==
- Florida Atlantic University, MA in Literature & Theory with a concentration in Science Fiction and Fantasy
- University of California, Riverside PhD Designated Emphasis in Science Fiction and Technoculture Studies.
- University of Liverpool, M.A. in Science Fiction Studies (course) (program explores genre of science fiction and its relationship to literature, science, and technology)
- Beijing Normal University, M.A. in Science Fiction Studies

=== Discontinued ===
- University of Dundee, MLitt in Science Fiction
- University of Kansas, MA, MFA, PhD in English with Emphasis in Science Fiction Studies

== Notable scholars ==
- Brian Aldiss
- Brian Attebery
- Everett F. Bleiler
- John W. Campbell
- John Clute
- Samuel R. Delany
- Hugo Gernsback
- James Gunn
- David Hartwell
- N. Katherine Hayles
- Veronica Hollinger
- Fredric Jameson
- Larry McCaffery
- Judith Merril
- Sam Moskowitz
- Tom Moylan
- Peter Nicholls
- Alexei Panshin
- Patrick Parrinder
- Adam Roberts
- Joanna Russ
- Andrew Sawyer
- Dorothy Scarborough
- Alan N. Shapiro
- Brian Stableford
- Darko Suvin
- Raymond Williams
- Gary K. Wolfe
- Lisa Yaszek

== Principal journals, conferences, societies, awards ==
Societies:

- Science Fiction Research Association (SFRA)
- Society for Utopian Studies
- International Association for the Fantastic in the Arts (IAFA)
- Utopian Studies Society
- London Science Fiction Research Community (LSFRC), London-based organisation of SF scholars and fans

General journals:

- Extrapolation
- Science Fiction Studies
- Foundation: The International Review of Science Fiction
- MOSF Journal of Science Fiction
- The Eaton Journal of Archival Research in Science Fiction
- Journal for the Fantastic in the Arts (JFA)
- Vector, critical magazine of the British Science Fiction Association (BSFA)

Review journals:

- The Internet Review of Science Fiction (IROSF)
- New York Review of Science Fiction (NYRSF)

Conferences:

- Science Fiction Research Association annual convention
- International Association for the Fantastic in the Arts (IAFA) annual convention
- Wiscon (hybrid academic science fiction conference/science fiction convention, with an extensive academic programming track concentrating on issues of gender, sexuality and class)
- Mythcon (Mythopoeic Society annual convention)
- Eaton Science Fiction Conference, biennial conference at University of California, Riverside
- Stage the Future conference on science fiction theatre

Significant scholarship awards:

- "Pilgrim Award", Science Fiction Research Association
- Pioneer Award for Outstanding Scholarship, Science Fiction Research Association
- "Distinguished Scholar Award", International Association for the Fantastic in the Arts
- J. Lloyd Eaton Memorial Award for the best critical book of the year focusing on science fiction
- Thomas D. Clareson Award for Distinguished Service to the field

Museums:

- Maison d'Ailleurs, in Yverdon-les-Bains (Switzerland)

== Significant works ==
- Kingsley Amis. New Maps of Hell: A Survey of Science Fiction. New York: Harcourt, 1960.
- Brian Attebery. Decoding Gender in Science Fiction. New York: Routledge, 2002.
- Marleen Barr, Alien to Femininity. Westport, CT: Greenwood, 1987. (Definitive first book-length work of feminist science fiction scholarship.)
- Marleen S. Barr and Carl Freedman, eds. PMLA: Special Topic: Science Fiction and Literary Studies: The Next Millennium. Vol. 119, No. 3, May 2004.
- Neil Barron, ed. Anatomy of Wonder: Science Fiction. New York: Bowker, 1976 (first ed.); numerous editions since.
- Mark Bould and China Miéville, eds. Red Planets: Marxism and Science Fiction. Middletown, CT: Wesleyan University Press, 2009.
- Algis Budrys, "Paradise Charted" (1980); "Nonliterary Influences on Science Fiction"; and "Literatures of Milieux"
- Seo-Young Chu. Do Metaphors Dream of Literal Sleep? A Science-Fictional Theory of Representation. Cambridge, MA: Harvard University Press, 2010.
- Samuel Gerald Collins. All Tomorrow's Cultures: Anthropological Engagements with the Future. New York: Berghahn, 2008.
- John Clute and Peter Nicholls, eds. The Encyclopedia of Science Fiction. New York: St. Martin's Press, 1993.
- Robert Crossley. Imagining Mars: A Literary History. Middletown, CT: Wesleyan UP, 2011.
- Istvan Csicsery-Ronay, Jr. The Seven Beauties of Science Fiction. Wesleyan, 2008.
- Samuel R. Delany. The Jewel-Hinged Jaw: Notes on the Language of Science Fiction. Elizabethtown, New York: Dragon, 1977.
- Lester del Rey. The World of Science Fiction, 1926-1976: The History of a Subculture. New York: Garland, 1976. Rpt. New York: Ballantine, 1979.
- Carl Freedman. Critical Theory and Science Fiction. Wesleyan University Press, 2000.
- Hugo Gernsback. Evolution of Modern Science Fiction. New York, 1952.
- Hugo Gernsback. "The Rise of Scientifiction." Amazing Stories Quarterly 1 (Spring 1928): 147.
- James Gunn. Isaac Asimov: The Foundations of Science Fiction. NY: Oxford UP, 1982. Rev. Ed. 1996.
- Donna Haraway. "A Cyborg Manifesto: Science, Technology, and Socialist-Feminism in the Late Twentieth Century." 1985. (Established cyborg feminism.)
- N. Katherine Hayles. How We Became Posthuman: Virtual Bodies in Cybernetics, Literature and Informatics. University Of Chicago Press, 1999.
- Mark R. Hillegas. "The Future as Nightmare: H. G. Wells and the Anti-Utopians." Oxford University Press, 1967.
- Edward James and Farah Mendlesohn, eds. The Cambridge Companion to Science Fiction. Cambridge: Cambridge UP, 2003.
- Fredric Jameson. Archaeologies of the Future: The Desire Called Utopia and Other Science Fictions. London: Verso, 2005.
- Brooks Landon. Science Fiction After 1900: From the Steam Man to the Stars. Studies in Literary Themes and Genres No. 12. New York: Twayne, 1997.
- Rob Latham. Consuming Youth: Vampires, Cyborgs, and the Culture of Consumption. Chicago: U Chicago Press, 2002.
- Ursula K. Le Guin, The Language of the Night: Essays on Fantasy and Science Fiction. New York: Perigee, 1980.
- Roger Luckhurst. Science Fiction. Polity, 2005.
- Carl Malmgren. Worlds Apart: Narratology of Science Fiction. Bloomington, IN: Indiana UP, 1991.
- Brian McHale. Postmodernist Fiction. New York: Methuen, 1987.
- Farah Mendlesohn. Rhetorics of Fantasy. Hanover: Wesleyan University Press, 2008.
- Andrew Milner. Locating Science Fiction. Liverpool: Liverpool University Press, 2012.
- Sam Moskowitz. The Immortal Storm: A History of Science Fiction Fandom. Atlanta: Atlanta Science Fiction Organization, 1954; reprinted Westport, CT: Hyperion Press, 1974.
- Tom Moylan. Demand the Impossible: Science Fiction and the Utopian Imagination. London: Methuen, 1986.
- Tom Moylan. Scraps of the Untainted Sky: Science Fiction, Utopia, Dystopia. Boulder and Oxford: Westview Press, 2000.
- Peter Y. Paik. From Utopia to Apocalypse: Science Fiction and the Politics of Catastrophe. Minneapolis: U of Minnesota P, 2010.
- Alexei Panshin. Heinlein in Dimension. Advent Publishers, 1972.
- Alexei Panshin and Cory Panshin, The World Beyond the Hill: Science Fiction and the Quest for Transcendence. New York: TARCHER, 1990.
- Eric S. Rabkin. The Fantastic in Literature. Princeton, NJ: Princeton UP, 1976.
- Adam Roberts. Science Fiction (The New Critical Idiom). Routledge, 2000, 2006.
- Adam Roberts. The History of Science Fiction. Basingstoke: Palgrave Macmillan, 2005.
- Joanna Russ. To Write Like a Woman: Essays in Feminism and Science Fiction. Indiana University Press, 1995.
- Robert Scholes. Structural Fabulation: An Essay on Fiction of the Future. Notre Dame, Indiana: University of Notre Dame Press, 1975.
- Alan N. Shapiro. Star Trek: Technologies of Disappearance. Berlin: Avinus Press, 2004.
- Norman Spinrad. Science Fiction in the Real World. Carbondale: Southern Illinois UP, 1990.
- Bruce Sterling, "Preface," in Mirrorshades: The Cyberpunk Anthology New York: Arbor, 1986. (Defined the term cyberpunk).
- Bruce Sterling. "Slipstream." Science Fiction Eye 1.5 (July 1989): 77–80.
- Darko Suvin. Metamorphoses of Science Fiction. New Haven, CT: Yale University Press, 1979. (Introduced the concept of cognitive estrangement.)
- Darko Suvin. Defined by a Hollow: Essays on Utopia, Science Fiction and Political Epistemology. Frankfurt am Main, Oxford and Bern: Peter Lang, 2010.
- Sherryl Vint. Animal Alterity: Science Fiction and the Question of the Animal. Liverpool: Liverpool UP, 2010.
- Gary Westfahl. Cosmic Engineers: A Study of Hard Science Fiction. Westport, CT: Greenwood, 1996.
- Raymond Williams. Tenses of Imagination: Raymond Williams on Science Fiction, Utopia and Dystopia. Ed. Andrew Milner. Frankfurt am Main, Oxford and Bern: Peter Lang, 2010.
- Gary K. Wolfe. Critical Terms for Science Fiction and Fantasy: A Glossary and Guide to Scholarship. Westport, CT: Greenwood Press, 1986. (work in librarianship establishing a thesaurus)
- Gary K. Wolfe. Evaporating Genres: Essays on Fantastic Literature. Middletown, CT: Wesleyan UP, 2011.

== Significant research resources, databases, and archives ==
A number of significant research collections and archives in SF studies have been developed in the past three to four decades. These include academic collections at the University of Liverpool, the University of Kansas, the Toronto Public Library, and the University of California, Riverside (the Eaton collection).

See Science fiction libraries and museums for a comprehensive list and description of relevant collections and research institutes.

== See also ==
- Fan studies
- Tolkien research
