= Timeline of science fiction =

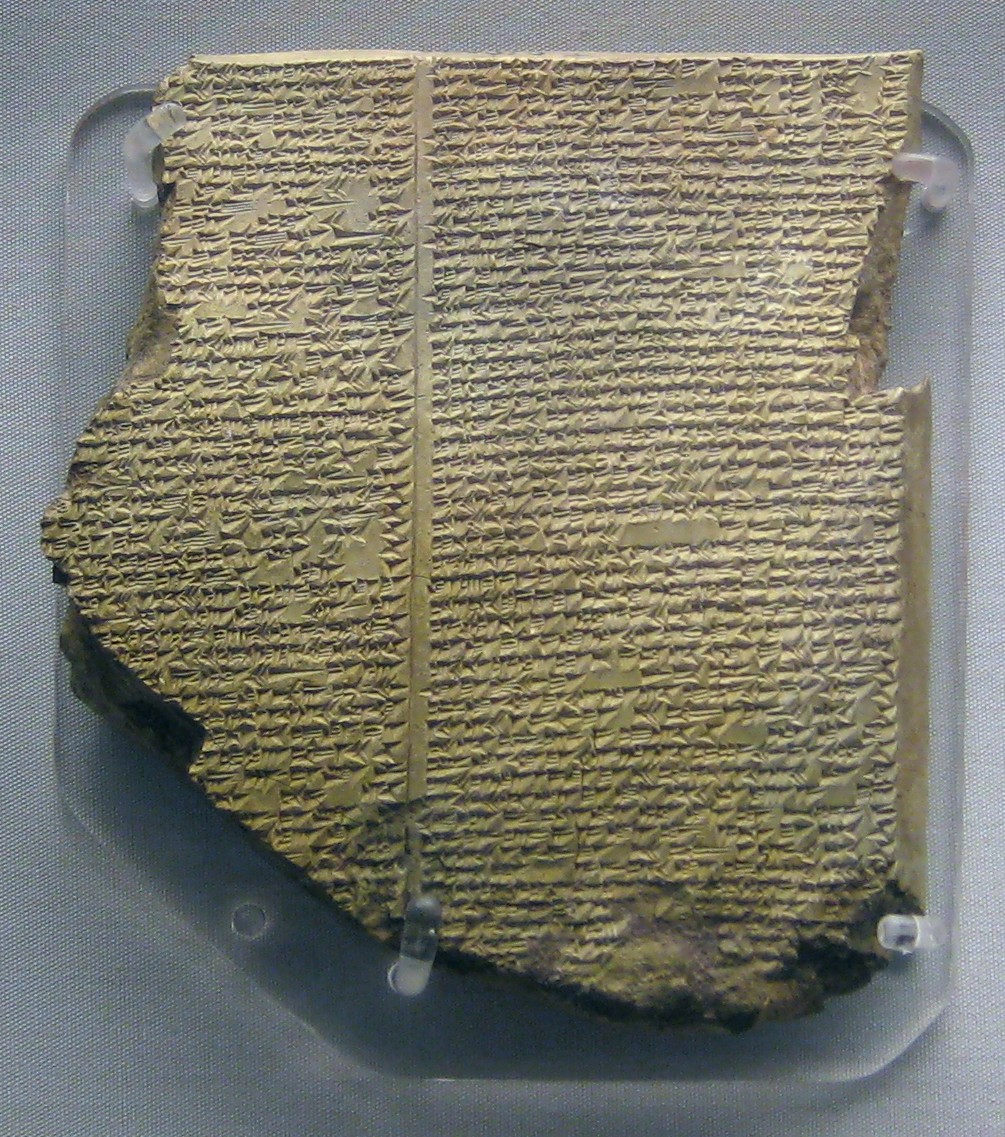
The starting point of science fiction depends on the definition used. By the broadest definition it began with the Epic of Gilgamesh (c. 2100 BCE), the oldest surviving work of fiction. Seen here is the so-called Flood tablet.

The history of science fiction spans centuries. While the date of the start of science fiction is debated and depends on the definition used, this list includes events included in timelines published by expert sources. (Note: Specifically, the following: Brian Ash's The Visual Encyclopedia of Science Fiction (1977); John Clute's Science Fiction: The Illustrated Encyclopedia (1995); Brian Stableford's Historical Dictionary of Science Fiction Literature (2004); Nick Hubble and Aris Mousoutzanis's The Science Fiction Handbook (2013); Gerry Canavan and Eric Carl Link's The Cambridge History of Science Fiction (2018); M. Keith Booker's Historical Dictionary of Science Fiction Cinema (2020); Allen Stroud's Historical Dictionary of Science Fiction (2026)) Among the proposed starting points are the Epic of Gilgamesh (c. 2100 BCE), Thomas More's Utopia (1516), Johannes Kepler's Somnium (1634), and Mary Shelley's Frankenstein (1818).

== 16th century ==
Year	Event	Ref.
1516	Utopia by Thomas More is published.	

== 17th century ==
Year	Event	Ref.
1634	Somnium by Johannes Kepler is published.	
1638	The Man in the Moone by Francis Godwin is published.	

== 18th century ==
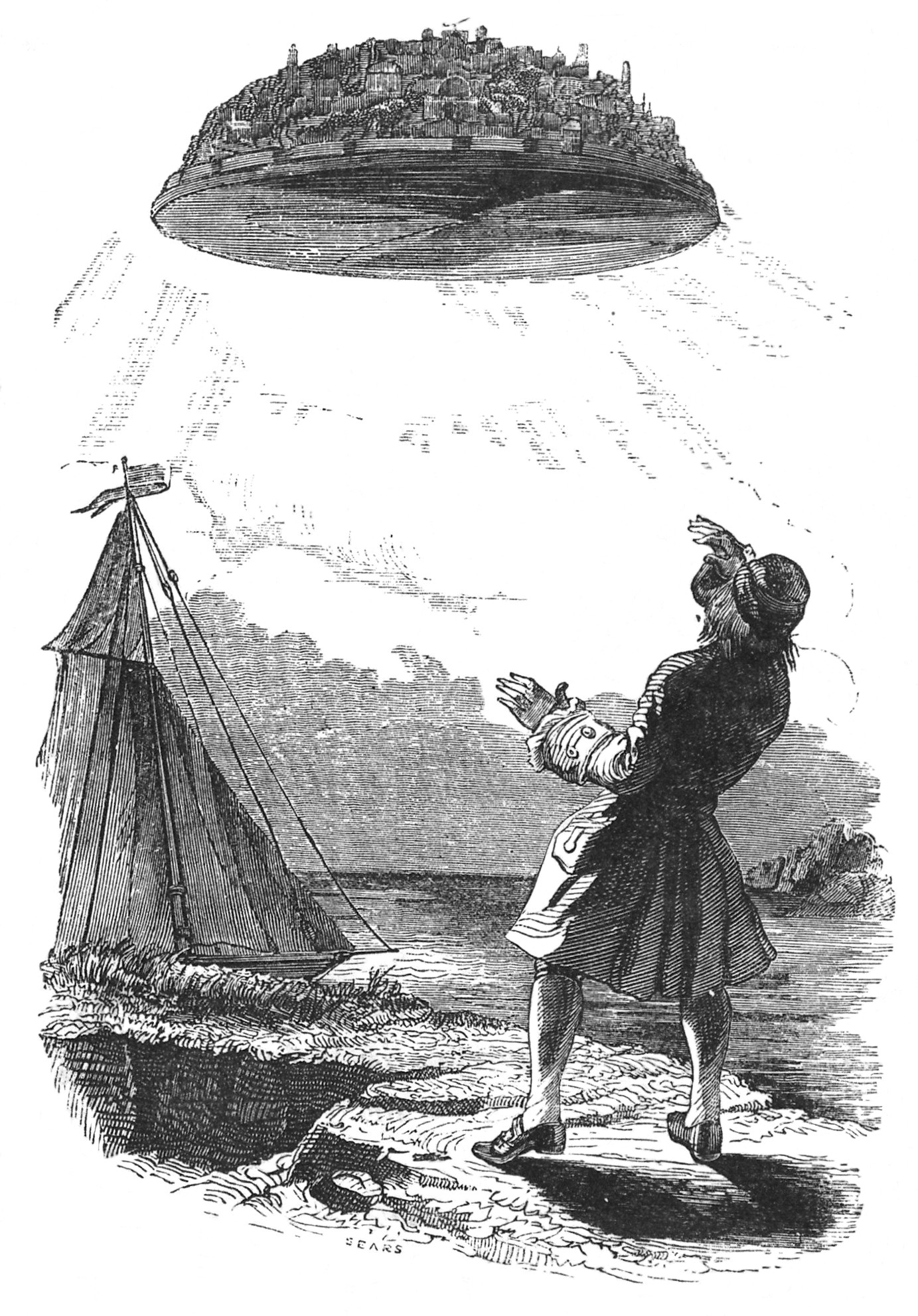
Lemuel Gulliver encountering the flying island of Laputa in Jonathan Swift's 1726 novel Gulliver's Travels

Year	Event	Ref.
1726	Gulliver's Travels by Jonathan Swift is published.	
1752	Micromégas by Voltaire is published.	
1771	The Year 2440 by Louis-Sébastien Mercier is published.	

== 19th century ==
Mary Shelley, author of the 1818 novel Frankenstein; or, The Modern Prometheus

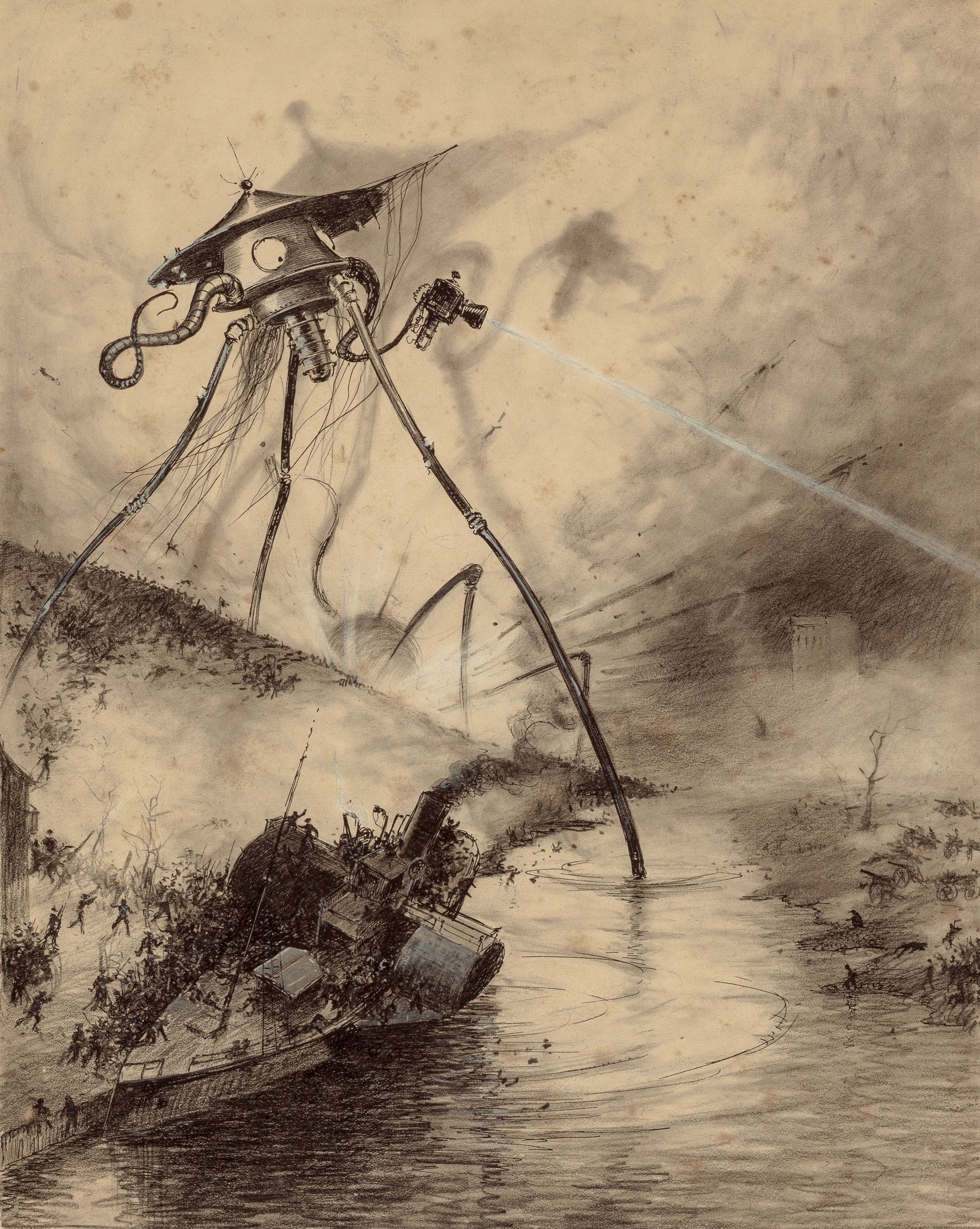
An alien invasion as featured in H. G. Wells' 1897 novel The War of the Worlds.

Year	Event	Ref.
1818	Frankenstein; or, The Modern Prometheus by Mary Shelley is published.	
1826	The Last Man by Mary Shelley is published.	
1864	Journey to the Center of the Earth by Jules Verne is published.	
1865	From the Earth to the Moon by Jules Verne is published.	
1868	The Steam Man of the Prairies by Edward S. Ellis, the first SF dime novel, is published.	
1869–1870	Twenty Thousand Leagues Under the Seas by Jules Verne is published in serial form.	
1886	Strange Case of Dr Jekyll and Mr Hyde by Robert Louis Stevenson is published.	
1888	Looking Backward, 2000–1887 by Edward Bellamy is published.	
1889	A Connecticut Yankee in King Arthur's Court by Mark Twain is published.	
1890	News from Nowhere by William Morris is published.	
1895	The Time Machine by H. G. Wells is published.	
1896	The Island of Doctor Moreau by H. G. Wells is published.	
1898	The War of the Worlds by H. G. Wells is published.	

== 1900s ==
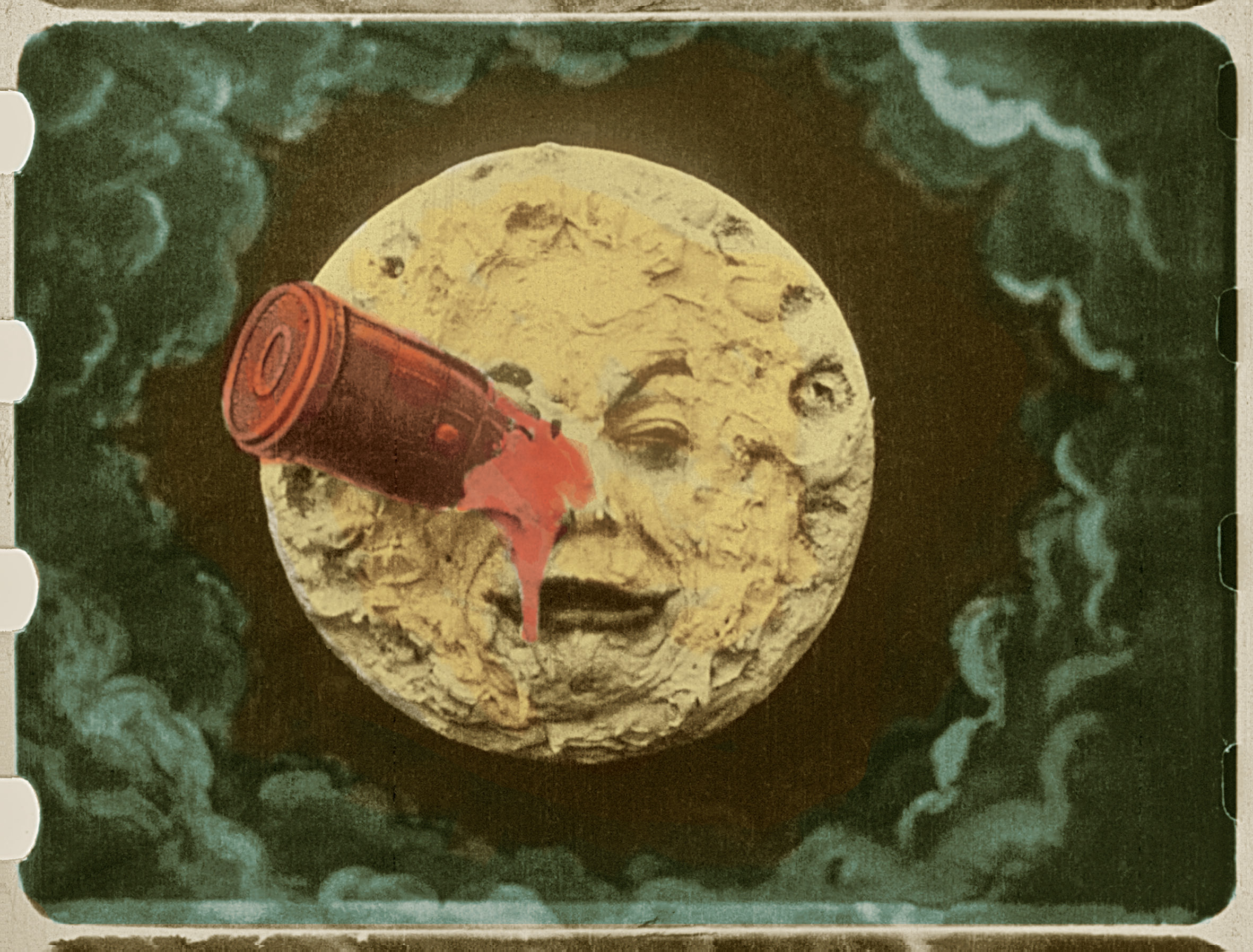
Hand-coloured still frame from Georges Méliès's 1902 short film Le Voyage dans la Lune

Year	Event	Ref.
1901	The First Men in the Moon by H. G. Wells is published.	
1902	The short film A Trip to the Moon (Le Voyage dans la Lune) by Georges Méliès, the earliest science fiction film, is released.	
1909	The Machine Stops by E. M. Forster is published.	

== 1910s ==
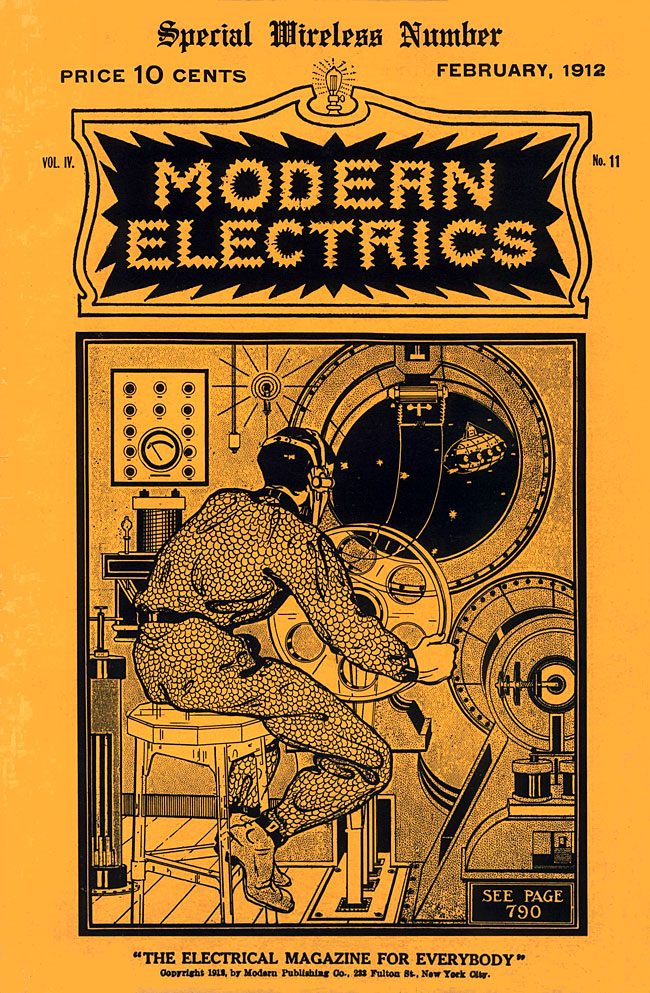
Modern Electrics, February 1912, featuring the serialization of Hugo Gernsback's Ralph 124C 41+

Year	Event	Ref.
1910	The short film Frankenstein by Thomas Edison's film company, the first film adaptation of the 1818 novel by Mary Shelley, is released.	
1911	Ralph 124C 41+ by Hugo Gernsback is published in serial form in Modern Electrics; it is published in book form in 1925.	
1911	The Hampdenshire Wonder by J. D. Beresford is published.	
1912	Under the Moons of Mars by Edgar Rice Burroughs is published.	
1912	The Lost World by Arthur Conan Doyle, which gives the name to the lost world subgenre of science fiction, is published.	

== 1920s ==
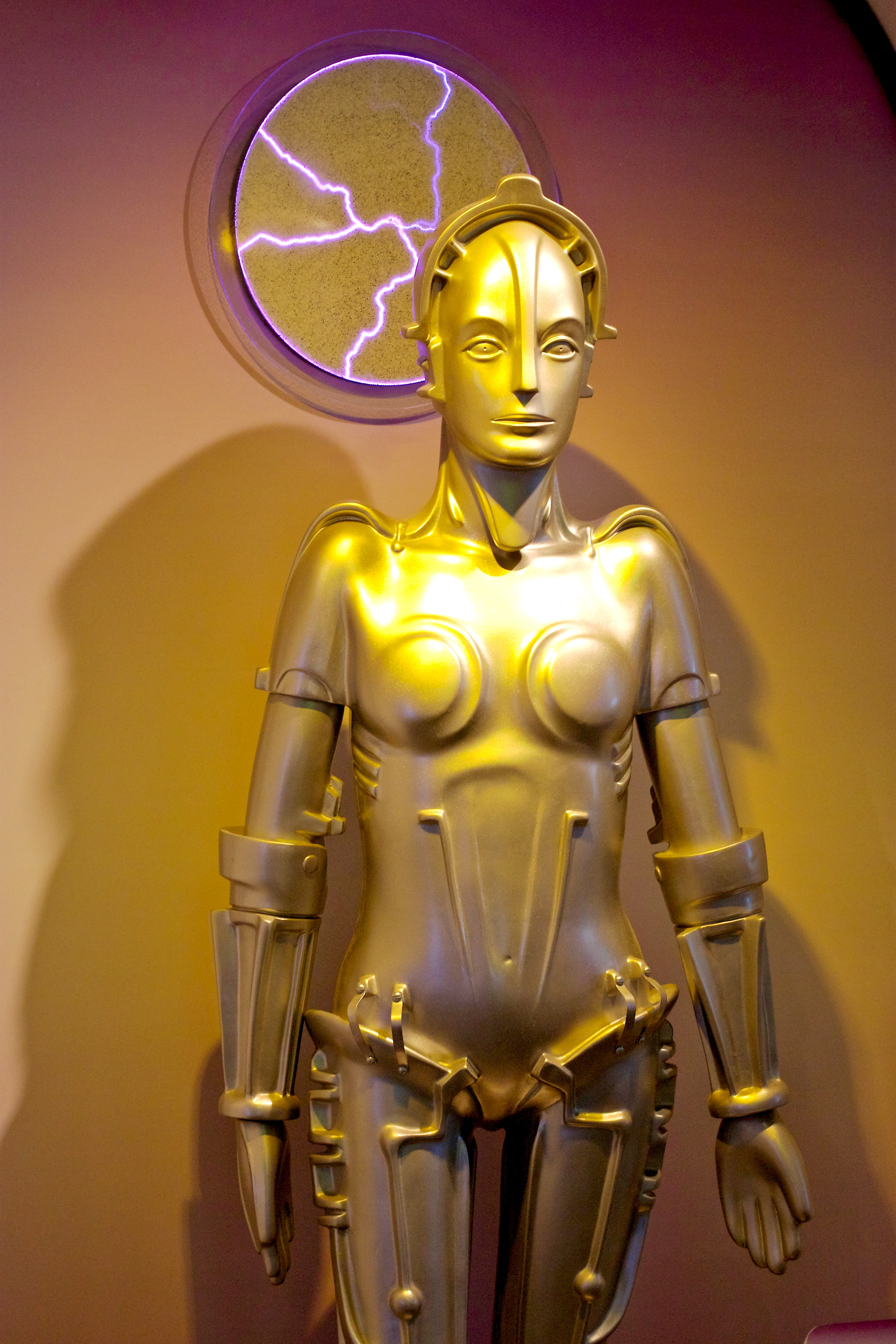
The Maschinenmensch from the 1927 film Metropolis

Year	Event	Ref.
1920	The play R.U.R. by Karel Čapek is published, introducing the word "robot". It is first performed in 1921.	
1923	Weird Tales is launched.	
1923	Hugo Gernsback dedicates the August issue of Science and Invention to "scientifiction".	
1924	We by Yevgeny Zamyatin is published.	
1926	Hugo Gernsback launches Amazing Stories, the first specialized science fiction magazine.	
1927	The film Metropolis, directed by Fritz Lang and based on the 1926 novel by Thea von Harbou, is released.	
1928	The Skylark of Space by E. E. Smith is published, launching the Skylark series.	

== 1930s ==
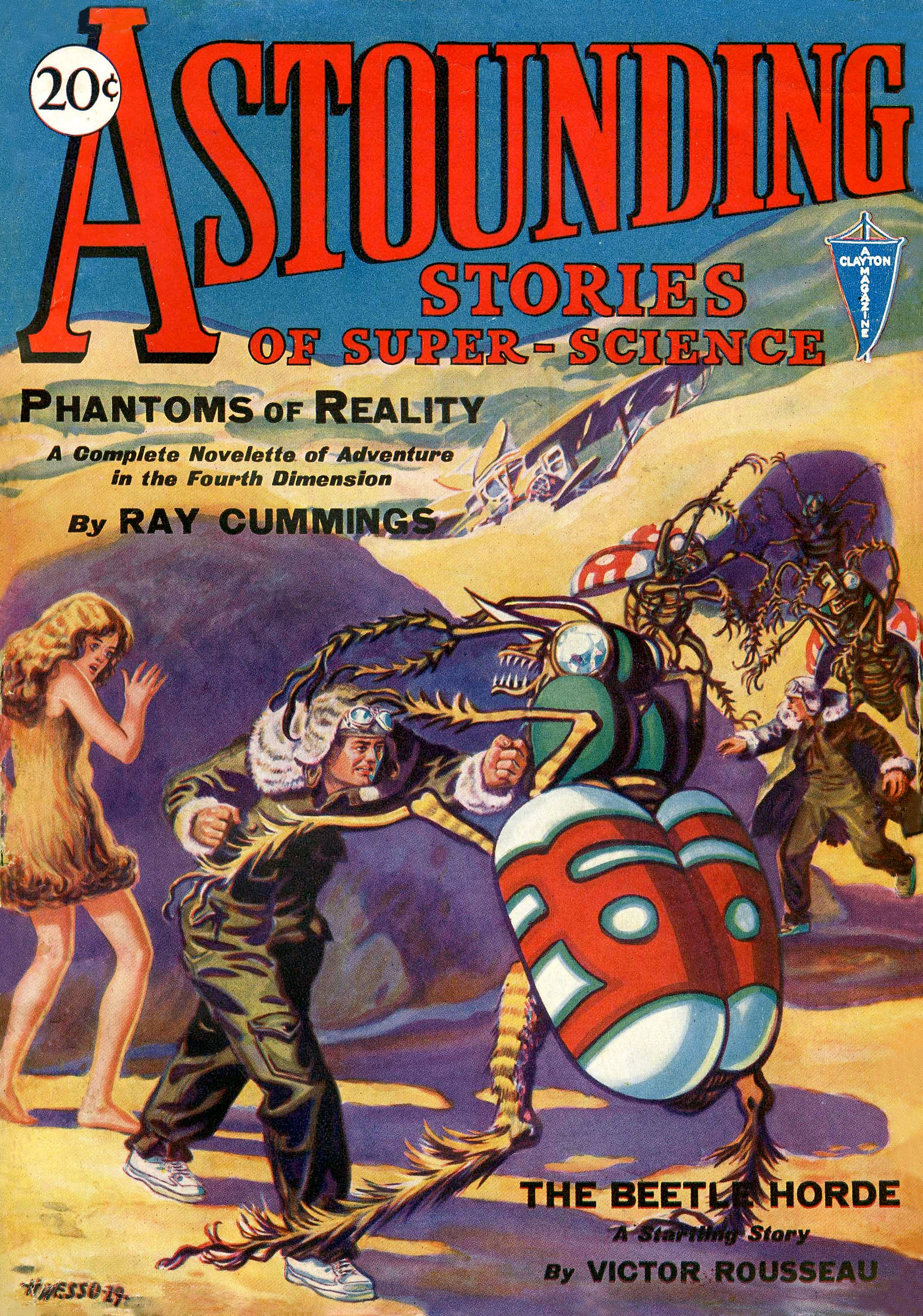
First issue of Astounding Stories of Super-Science, dated January 1930. The cover art is by Hans Waldemar Wessolowski.

Year	Event	Ref.
1930	Last and First Men by Olaf Stapledon is published.	
1930	Astounding Stories of Super-Science begins publication. The title is changed to Astounding Stories the following year in 1931.	
1930	The film Just Imagine, directed by David Butler, is released.	
1931	The film Frankenstein, directed by James Whale, is released.	
1932	Brave New World by Aldous Huxley is published.	
1934	"Sidewise in Time" by Murray Leinster is published.	
1934	"A Martian Odyssey" by Stanley G. Weinbaum is published.	
1936	The film Things to Come, directed by William Cameron Menzies and based on the 1933 novel The Shape of Things to Come by H. G. Wells, is released.	
1936	The first Flash Gordon film serial is released.	
1937	John W. Campbell becomes editor of Astounding Stories, launching the so-called Golden Age of Science Fiction. The title is changed to Astounding Science-Fiction the following year in 1938.	
1937	Star Maker by Olaf Stapledon is published.	
1938	Superman first appears in the first issue of Action Comics.	
1939	"Lest Darkness Fall" by L. Sprague de Camp is published in Unknown. It is published in an expanded novel form in 1941.	
1939	The first annual World Science Fiction Convention is held in conjunction with the 1939 New York World's Fair.	

== 1940s ==
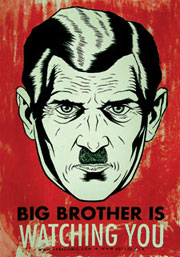
A depiction of Big Brother from a comic adaptation of George Orwell's 1949 novel Nineteen Eighty-Four

Year	Event	Ref.
1940	The Future History stories "If This Goes On—" and "The Roads Must Roll" by Robert A. Heinlein are published in Astounding Science Fiction.	
1940	Slan by A. E. van Vogt is published as a serial; it is later published in book form in 1946.	
1942	"Foundation" by Isaac Asimov, the first story in what would become the 1951 fix-up novel Foundation and later the broader Foundation series, is published.	
1944	"City" by Clifford D. Simak, the first story in what would become the 1952 fix-up novel City, is published.	
1946	Adventures in Time and Space, an anthology edited by Raymond J. Healy and J. Francis McComas, is published.	
1949	Nineteen Eighty-Four by George Orwell is published.	
1949	The Magazine of Fantasy and Science Fiction begins publication.	

== 1950s ==
Year	Event	Ref.
1950	The Martian Chronicles by Ray Bradbury is published.	
1950	Galaxy Science Fiction begins publication.	
1950	The film Destination Moon, directed by Irving Pichel, is released.	
1951	The film The Day the Earth Stood Still is released.	
1952	The Space Merchants by Frederik Pohl and Cyril M. Kornbluth is published in serial form as Gravy Planet; it is published in book form in 1953.	
1953	The Demolished Man by Alfred Bester is published and wins the first Hugo Award for Best Novel.	
1953	Fahrenheit 451 by Ray Bradbury is published.	
1953	Childhood's End by Arthur C. Clarke is published.	
1953	Mission of Gravity by Hal Clement is published in serial form; it is published in book form in 1954.	
1953	The film The War of the Worlds is released.	
1955	"A Canticle for Leibowitz" by Walter M. Miller Jr., the first story in what would become the 1959 fix-up novel A Canticle for Leibowitz, is published.	
1955	The film This Island Earth is released.	
1956	The Stars My Destination (a.k.a. Tiger! Tiger!) by Alfred Bester is published.	
1956	The film Invasion of the Body Snatchers is released.	
1956	The film Forbidden Planet is released.	
1959	Starship Troopers by Robert A. Heinlein is published.	
1959	The Sirens of Titan by Kurt Vonnegut is published.	
1959	Dorsai! by Gordon R. Dickson is published.	

== 1960s ==
Year	Event	Ref.
1960	The film The Time Machine is released.	
1960	Astounding Science Fiction is retitled Analog Science Fact and Fiction.	
1961	Stranger in a Strange Land by Robert A. Heinlein is published.	
1961	Solaris by Stanisław Lem is published.	
1962	The Man in the High Castle by Philip K. Dick is published.	
1963	Doctor Who begins airing.	
1964	Farnham's Freehold by Robert A. Heinlein is published.	
1964	Michael Moorcock becomes editor of New Worlds.	
1965	Dune by Frank Herbert is published and wins the first Nebula Award for Best Novel.	
1965	The Moon Is a Harsh Mistress by Robert A. Heinlein is published.	
1966	Babel-17 by Samuel R. Delany is published.	
1966	Star Trek begins airing.	
1967	Dangerous Visions, a New Wave anthology edited by Harlan Ellison, is published.	
1968	Stand on Zanzibar by John Brunner is published.	
1968	Do Androids Dream of Electric Sheep? by Philip K. Dick is published.	
1968	The film 2001: A Space Odyssey, directed by Stanley Kubrick, is released.	
1968	The film Planet of the Apes is released.	
1968	Locus begins publication.	
1969	The Left Hand of Darkness by Ursula K. Le Guin is published.	

== 1970s ==
Star Wars was released in 1977. Its success, and that of the works that followed in its wake, shifted the dominant medium of science fiction away from literature and towards visual media.

Year	Event	Ref.
1970	Ringworld by Larry Niven is published.	
1970	The Science Fiction Research Association is founded.	
1971	The Lathe of Heaven by Ursula K. Le Guin is published.	
1971	The film THX 1138, directed by George Lucas, is released.	
1971	The film A Clockwork Orange, directed by Stanley Kubrick, is released.	
1972	The film Solaris is released.	
1973	Rendezvous with Rama by Arthur C. Clarke is published.	
1973	The journal Science Fiction Studies begins publication.	
1974	The Dispossessed by Ursula K. Le Guin is published.	
1975	The Female Man by Joanna Russ is published.	
1976	Triton by Samuel R. Delany is published.	
1977	The film Star Wars, directed by George Lucas, is released.	
1979	The Hitchhiker's Guide to the Galaxy by Douglas Adams, adapted from the 1978 radio series, is published.	
1979	The film Alien, directed by Ridley Scott, is released.	
1979	The first edition of The Encyclopedia of Science Fiction, edited by John Clute and Peter Nicholls, is published; an expanded second edition is published in 1993.	
1979	Metamorphoses of Science Fiction by Darko Suvin, translated from the original 1977 French version, is published.	

== 1980s ==
Year	Event	Ref.
1982	The film Blade Runner, directed by Ridley Scott, is released.	
1982	The film E.T. the Extra-Terrestrial, directed by Steven Spielberg, is released.	
1984	Neuromancer by William Gibson, one of the earliest works of the cyberpunk subgenre, is published.	
1985	The Handmaid's Tale by Margaret Atwood is published; it wins the inaugural Arthur C. Clarke Award in 1987.	
1985	The film Back to the Future is released. Two sequels—Back to the Future Part II and Part III—are released in 1989 and 1990, respectively.	
1986	The film Aliens, directed by James Cameron, is released.	
1987	Consider Phlebas by Iain M. Banks is published.	
1989	Hyperion by Dan Simmons is published.	

== 1990s ==
Year	Event	Ref.
1991	The film Terminator 2: Judgment Day, directed by James Cameron, is released.	
1992	Red Mars by Kim Stanley Robinson, the first book in the Mars trilogy, is published.	
1992	Snow Crash by Neal Stephenson is published.	
1993	Parable of the Sower by Octavia E. Butler is published.	
1993	The film Jurassic Park, directed by Steven Spielberg, is released.	
1995	The Star Fraction by Ken MacLeod is published.	
1996	The film Independence Day, directed by Roland Emmerich, is released.	
1997	The film Gattaca, directed by Andrew Niccol, is released.	
1999	The film The Matrix, directed by The Wachowskis, is released.	

== 2000s ==
Year	Event	Ref.
2000	Perdido Street Station by China Miéville is published.	
2002	The Years of Rice and Salt by Kim Stanley Robinson is published.	
2005	Accelerando by Charles Stross is published.	
2005	The film The Hitchhiker's Guide to the Galaxy, directed by Garth Jennings, is released.	
2009	The film Avatar, directed by James Cameron, is released.	

== 2010s ==
Year	Event	Ref.
2010	The film Inception, directed by Christopher Nolan, is released.	
2012	2312 by Kim Stanley Robinson is published.	
2012	The film The Hunger Games, directed by Gary Ross, is released.	
2013	The film Elysium, directed by Neill Blomkamp, is released.	
2013	The film Gravity, directed by Alfonso Cuarón, is released.	
2014	The film Ex Machina, directed by Alex Garland, is released.	
2014	The film Interstellar, directed by Christopher Nolan, is released.	
2015	The film The Martian, directed by Ridley Scott, is released.	
2016	The film Arrival, directed by Denis Villeneuve, is released.	
2017	The film Blade Runner 2049, directed by Denis Villeneuve, is released.	

== See also ==
- History of science fiction
- List of films set in the future
- List of science fiction authors
- Lists of science fiction films
- List of science fiction television programs
- List of science fiction television films
- List of science fiction novels
- List of years in literature
