= Extremism in America =

Extremism in America is the title of the following publications:

- Extremism in America: A Reader, a book by Lyman Tower Sargent
- Extremism in America, an encyclopedic online resource by the Anti-Defamation League
- Extremism in America, a book edited by George Michael
