= Alan Shapiro =

Alan Shapiro may refer to:

- Alan Shapiro (poet), American poet and professor of English and creative writing
- Alan N. Shapiro, American science fiction and media theorist
- Alan Shapiro (education reformer), American educator and educational reformer

== See also ==
- Allen Shapiro, American media executive and investor
- Al Shapiro (Allen), American cartoonist
