= Definitions of science fiction =

There have been many attempts at defining science fiction. This is a list of definitions that have been offered by authors, editors, critics and fans over the years since science fiction became a genre. Definitions of related terms such as "science fantasy", "speculative fiction", and "fabulation" are included where they are intended as definitions of aspects of science fiction or because they illuminate related definitions—see e.g. Robert Scholes's definitions of "fabulation" and "structural fabulation" below. Some definitions of sub-types of science fiction are included, too; for example see David Ketterer's definition of "philosophically-oriented science fiction". In addition, some definitions are included that define, for example, a science fiction story, rather than science fiction itself, since these also illuminate an underlying definition of science fiction.

The Encyclopedia of Science Fiction, edited by John Clute and Peter Nicholls, contains an extensive discussion of the problem of definition, under the heading "Definitions of SF". The authors regard Darko Suvin's definition as having been most useful in catalysing academic debate, though they consider disagreements to be inevitable as science fiction is not homogeneous. Suvin's cited definition, dating from 1972, is: "a literary genre whose necessary and sufficient conditions are the presence and interaction of estrangement and cognition, and whose main formal device is an imaginative framework alternative to the author's empirical environment". The authors of the Encyclopedia article—Brian Stableford, Clute, and Nicholls—explain that, by "cognition", Suvin refers to the seeking of rational understanding, while his concept of estrangement is similar to the idea of alienation developed by Bertolt Brecht, that is, a means of making the subject matter recognizable while also seeming unfamiliar.

Tom Shippey compared George Orwell's Coming Up for Air (1939) with Frederik Pohl and C. M. Kornbluth's The Space Merchants (1952), and concluded that the basic building block and distinguishing feature of a science fiction novel is the presence of the novum, a term Darko Suvin adapted from Ernst Bloch and defined as "a discrete piece of information recognizable as not-true, but also as not-unlike-true, not-flatly- (and in the current state of knowledge) impossible."

The order of the quotations is chronological; quotations without definite dates are listed last.

== Definitions ==
=== In chronological order ===
- Hugo Gernsback. 1926. "By 'scientifiction' I mean the Jules Verne, H. G. Wells and Edgar Allan Poe type of story—a charming romance intermingled with scientific fact and prophetic vision... Not only do these amazing tales make tremendously interesting reading—they are always instructive. They supply knowledge... in a very palatable form... New adventures pictured for us in the scientifiction of today are not at all impossible of realization tomorrow... Many great science stories destined to be of historical interest are still to be written... Posterity will point to them as having blazed a new trail, not only in literature and fiction, but progress as well."
- J. O. Bailey. 1947. "A piece of scientific fiction is a narrative of an imaginary invention or discovery in the natural sciences and consequent adventures and experiences... It must be a scientific discovery—something that the author at least rationalizes as possible to science."
- Robert A. Heinlein. 1947. "Let's gather up the bits and pieces and define the Simon-pure science fiction story: 1. The conditions must be, in some respect, different from here-and-now, although the difference may lie only in an invention made in the course of the story. 2. The new conditions must be an essential part of the story. 3. The problem itself—the "plot"—must be a human problem. 4. The human problem must be one which is created by, or indispensably affected by, the new conditions. 5. And lastly, no established fact shall be violated, and, furthermore, when the story requires that a theory contrary to present accepted theory be used, the new theory should be rendered reasonably plausible and it must include and explain established facts as satisfactorily as the one the author saw fit to junk. It may be far-fetched, it may seem fantastic, but it must not be at variance with observed facts, i.e., if you are going to assume that the human race descended from Martians, then you've got to explain our apparent close relationship to terrestrial anthropoid apes as well."
- John W. Campbell, Jr. 1947. "To be science fiction, not fantasy, an honest effort at prophetic extrapolation from the known must be made."
  - ―. "Scientific methodology involves the proposition that a well-constructed theory will not only explain every known phenomenon, but will also predict new and still undiscovered phenomena. Science-fiction tries to do much the same—and write up, in story form, what the results look like when applied not only to machines, but to human society as well." (Note: From the introduction to George O. Smith's Venus Equilateral series, originally published in 1947.)
- Damon Knight. 1952. At the start of a series of book review columns, Knight stated the following as one of his assumptions: "That the term 'science fiction' is a misnomer, that trying to get two enthusiasts to agree on a definition of it leads only to bloody knuckles; that better labels have been devised (Heinlein's suggestion, 'speculative fiction', is the best, I think), but that we're stuck with this one; and that it will do us no particular harm if we remember that, like 'The Saturday Evening Post', it means what we point to when we say it." This definition is now usually seen in abbreviated form as "Science fiction is [or means] what we point to when we say it."
- Theodore Sturgeon. 1952. "A science fiction story is a story built around human beings, with a human problem, and a human solution, which would not have happened at all without its scientific content."
- Basil Davenport. 1955. "Science fiction is fiction based upon some imagined development of science, or upon the extrapolation of a tendency in society."
- Edmund Crispin. 1955. A science fiction story "is one that presupposes a technology, or an effect of technology, or a disturbance in the natural order, such as humanity, up to the time of writing, has not in actual fact experienced."
- Robert A. Heinlein. 1959. "Realistic speculation about possible future events, based solidly on adequate knowledge of the real world, past and present, and on a thorough understanding of the nature and significance of the scientific method. To make this definition cover all science fiction (instead of 'almost all') it is necessary only to strike out the word 'future'.
- Kingsley Amis. 1960. "Science fiction is that class of prose narrative treating of a situation that could not arise in the world we know, but which is hypothesized on the basis of some innovation in science or technology, or pseudo-science or pseudo-technology, whether human or extra-terrestrial in origin."
- James Blish. 1960 or 1964. Science fantasy is "a kind of hybrid in which plausibility is specifically invoked for most of the story, but may be cast aside in patches at the author's whim and according to no visible system or principle."
- Rod Serling. 1962. "Fantasy is the impossible made probable. Science Fiction is the improbable made possible."
- Judith Merril. 1966. "Speculative fiction: stories whose objective is to explore, to discover, to learn, by means of projection, extrapolation, analogue, hypothesis-and-paper-experimentation, something about the nature of the universe, of man, or 'reality'... I use the term 'speculative fiction' here specifically to describe the mode which makes use of the traditional 'scientific method' (observation, hypothesis, experiment) to examine some postulated approximation of reality, by introducing a given set of changes—imaginary or inventive—into the common background of 'known facts', creating an environment in which the responses and perceptions of the characters will reveal something about the inventions, the characters, or both". (Note: Originally published in the May 1966 issue of Extrapolation.)
- James Blish. 1968. "At the very worst, every story ought to contain some trace of some science, and at best they ought to depend on it. This means no fantasies, nothing put in solely because they author wrote a best-selling mainstream novel in 1920, no political parables and no what-is-its".
- Algis Budrys. 1968. When reviewing Vladislav Krapivin's "Meeting My Brother": "The science in it is used solely for the purpose of offering an otherwise impossible solution to a common human problem; this is the latest definition of science fiction, on either side of the Iron Curtain/time-shift".
- Frederik Pohl. 1968. "Someone once said that a good science-fiction story should be able to predict not the automobile but the traffic jam. We agree".
- Darko Suvin. 1972. Science fiction is "a literary genre whose necessary and sufficient conditions are the presence and interaction of estrangement and cognition, and whose main formal device is an imaginative framework alternative to the author's empirical environment."
- Thomas M. Disch. 1973. "The basic premise of all s-f—that Absolutely Anything Can Happen and Should—has never been so handsomely and hilariously realized as in An Alien Heat." (Cover blurb for the 1973 Harper and Row edition of the novel by Michael Moorcock).
- Brian Aldiss. 1973. "Science fiction is the search for a definition of man and his status in the universe which will stand in our advanced but confused state of knowledge (science), and is characteristically cast in the Gothic or post-Gothic mould". Revised 1986. "a definition of mankind...", "...post-Gothic mode".
- Ray Bradbury. 1974. Science fiction is "the one field that reached out and embraced every sector of the human imagination, every endeavor, every idea, every technological development, and every dream." "I called us a nation of Ardent Blasphemers. We ran about measuring not only how things were but how they ought to be. ... We Americans are better than we hope and worse than we think, which is to say, we are the most paradoxical of all of the paradoxical nations in time. Which is what science fiction is all about. For science fiction runs out with tapes to measure Now against Then against Tomorrow Breakfast. It triangulates mankind amongst these geometrical threads, praising him, warning him." "For, above all, science fiction, as far back as Plato trying to figure out a proper society, has always been a fable teacher of morality...There is no large problem in the world this afternoon that is not a science-fictional problem." "Science fiction then is the fiction of revolutions. Revolutions in time, space, medicine, travel, and thought...Above all, science fiction is the fiction of warm-blooded human men and women sometimes elevated and sometimes crushed by their machines." "So science fiction, we now see, is interested in more than sciences, more than machines. That more is always men and women and children themselves, how they behave, how they hope to behave. Science fiction is apprehensive of future modes of behavior as well as future constructions of metal." "Science fiction guesses at sciences before they are sprung out of the brows of thinking men. More, the authors in the field try to guess at machines which are the fruit of these sciences. Then we try to guess at how mankind will react to these machines, how use them, how grow with them, how be destroyed by them. All, all of it fantastic."
- David Ketterer. 1974. "Philosophically-oriented science fiction, extrapolating on what we know in the context of our vaster ignorance, comes up with a startling donnée, or rationale, that puts humanity in a radically new perspective."
- Norman Spinrad. 1974. "Science fiction is anything published as science fiction."
- Isaac Asimov. 1975. "Science fiction can be defined as that branch of literature which deals with the reaction of human beings to changes in science and technology."
- Robert Scholes. 1975. Fabulation is "fiction that offers us a world clearly and radically discontinuous from the one we know, yet returns to confront that known world in some cognitive way."
  - ―. 1975. In structural fabulation, "the tradition of speculative fiction is modified by an awareness of the universe as a system of systems, a structure of structures, and the insights of the past century of science are accepted as fictional points of departure. Yet structural fabulation is neither scientific in its methods nor a substitute for actual science. It is a fictional exploration of human situations made perceptible by the implications of recent science. Its favourite themes involve the impact of developments or revelations derived from the human or physical sciences upon the people who must live with those revelations or developments."
  - ― and Eric Rabkin. 1977. "...science fiction could begin to exist as a literary form only when a different future became conceivable by human beings―specifically a future in which new knowledge, new discoveries, new adventures, new mutations, would make life radically different from the familiar patterns of the past and present." "The worlds of Dante and Milton remain separate from science fiction because they are constructed on a plan derived from religious tradition rather than scientific speculation or imagination based, however loosely, on science."
- James Gunn. 1977. "Science Fiction is the branch of literature that deals with the effects of change on people in the real world as it can be projected into the past, the future, or to distant places. It often concerns itself with scientific or technological change, and it usually involves matters whose importance is greater than the individual or the community; often civilization or the race itself is in danger."
- Darko Suvin. 1979. "SF is distinguished by the narrative dominance or hegemony of a fictional "novum" (novelty, innovation) validated by cognitive logic."
- Patrick Parrinder. 1980. "'Hard' SF is related to 'hard facts' and also to the 'hard' or engineering sciences. It does not necessarily entail realistic speculation about a future world, though its bias is undoubtedly realistic. Rather, this is the sort of SF that most appeals to scientists themselves—and is often written by them. The typical 'hard' SF writer looks for new and unfamiliar scientific theories and discoveries which could provide the occasion for a story, and, at its more didactic extreme, the story is only a framework for introducing the scientific concept to the reader."
  - ―. 1980. "In 'space opera' (the analogy is with the Western 'horse opera' rather than the 'soap opera') the reverse [Parrinder is referring to his definition of "hard sf"] is true; a melodramatic adventure-fantasy involving stock themes and settings is evolved on the flimsiest scientific basis."
- Philip K. Dick. 1981. "I will define science fiction, first, by saying what SF is not. It cannot be defined as “a story (or novel or play) set in the future,” since there exists such a thing as space adventure, which is set in the future but is not SF: it is just that: adventures, fights and wars in the future in space involving super-advanced technology. Why, then, is it not science fiction? It would seem to be, and Doris Lessing (e.g.) supposes that it is. However, space adventure lacks the distinct new idea that is the essential ingredient. Also, there can be science fiction set in the present: the alternate world story or novel. So if we separate SF from the future and also from ultra-advanced technology, what then do we have that can be called SF? We have a fictitious world; that is the first step: it is a society that does not in fact exist, but is predicated on our known society; that is, our known society acts as a jumping-off point for it; the society advances out of our own in some way, perhaps orthogonally, as with the alternate world story or novel. It is our world dislocated by some kind of mental effort on the part of the author, our world transformed into that which it is not or not yet. This world must differ from the given in at least one way, and this one way must be sufficient to give rise to events that could not occur in our society—or in any known society present or past. There must be a coherent idea involved in this dislocation; that is, the dislocation must be a conceptual one, not merely a trivial or bizarre one—this is the essence of science fiction, the conceptual dislocation within the society so that as a result a new society is generated in the author's mind, transferred to paper, and from paper it occurs as a convulsive shock in the reader's mind, the shock of dysrecognition. He knows that it is not his actual world that he is reading about."
- Barry N. Malzberg. 1982. "Science fiction is that form of literature which deals with the effects of technological change in an imagined future, an alternative present or a reconceived history".
- David Pringle. 1985. "Science fiction is a form of fantastic fiction which exploits the imaginative perspectives of modern science".
- Kim Stanley Robinson. 1987. Sf is "an historical literature... In every sf narrative, there is an explicit or implicit fictional history that connects the period depicted to our present moment, or to some moment in our past."
- Christopher Evans. 1988. "Perhaps the crispest definition is that science fiction is a literature of 'what if?' What if we could travel in time? What if we were living on other planets? What if we made contact with alien races? And so on. The starting point is that the writer supposes things are different from how we know them to be."
- Isaac Asimov. 1990. "'Hard science fiction' [is] stories that feature authentic scientific knowledge and depend upon it for plot development and plot resolution."
- Arthur C. Clarke. 2000. "Science fiction is something that could happen—but you usually wouldn't want it to. Fantasy is something that couldn't happen—though you often only wish that it could." (emphasis original)
- Jeff Prucher. 2006. Science fiction is "a genre (of literature, film, etc.) in which the setting differs from our own world (e.g. by the invention of new technology, through contact with aliens, by having a different history, etc.), and in which the difference is based on extrapolations made from one or more changes or suppositions; hence, such a genre in which the difference is explained (explicitly or implicitly) in scientific or rational, as opposed to supernatural, terms."
- Orson Scott Card listed five types of stories that generally fall into science fiction. 2010.
1. All stories set in the future, because the future can't be known. This includes all stories speculating about future technologies, which is, for some people, the only thing that science fiction is good for. Ironically, many stories written in the 1940s and 1950s that were set in what was then the future—the 1960s, 1970s and 1980s—are no longer "futuristic." Yet they aren't "false," either, because few science fiction writers pretend to be writing what will happen. Rather, they write what might happen. So those out-of-date futures, like that depicted in the novel 1984, simply shift from the "future" category to:
2. All stories set in the historical past that contradict known facts of history. Within the field of science fiction, these are called "alternate world" stories. For instance, what if the Cuban Missile Crisis had led to nuclear war? What if Hitler had died in 1939? In the real world, of course, these events did not happen—so stories that take place in such false pasts are the purview of science fiction and fantasy.
3. All stories set in other worlds, because we've never gone there. Whether "future humans" take part in the story or not, if it isn't Earth, it belongs to this genre.
4. All stories supposedly set on Earth, but before recorded history and contradicting the known archaeological record—stories about visits from ancient aliens, or ancient civilizations that left no trace, or "lost kingdoms" surviving into modern times.
5. All stories that contradict some known or supposed law of nature. Obviously, fantasy that uses magic falls into this category, but so does much science fiction: time travel stories, for instance, or "invisible man" stories.
- Andrew Milner. 2012. Science fiction "is a selective tradition, continuously reinvented in the present, through which the boundaries of the genre are continuously policed, challenged and disrupted, and the cultural identity of the SF community continuously established, preserved and transformed. It is thus essentially and necessarily a site of contestation."
- Jesse Sheidlower. 2021. Science fiction is "a genre (of fiction, film, etc.) in which the plot or setting features speculative scientific or technological advances or differences."

=== Undated (alphabetically by author) ===
- John Boyd. "... storytelling, usually imaginative as distinct from realistic fiction, which poses the effects of current or extrapolated scientific discoveries, or a single discovery, on the behavior of individuals [or] society."
- Frederik Pohl. "Science fiction is a way of thinking about things."
- Tom Shippey. "Science fiction is hard to define because it is the literature of change and it changes while you are trying to define it."
