= Utopian Studies Society =

European interdisciplinary association

The Utopian Studies Society (founded 1988) is a European interdisciplinary association devoted to the study of utopianism in all its forms. The Society was established by a group of British scholars following an international conference on the subject at New Lanark, the site of a famous experiment in industrial organisation by the early socialist Robert Owen. The Society was re-launched in 1999, following the "Millennium of Utopias" conference at the University of East Anglia. Prominent utopian studies scholars associated with the European Society include Gregory Claeys, Lyman Tower Sargent, Ruth Levitas, Tom Moylan, Raffaella Baccolini, Artur Blaim, Vincent Geoghegan, Lucy Sargisson and Fatima Vieira.

== Conferences ==
The Society has organized a series of conferences:

- 2025: University of Valencia, Spain.
- 2024: Central European University, Hungary.
- 2023: Babes-Bolyai University, Romania
- 2022: University of Brighton, England.
- 2021: University of Porto, Portugal.
- 2020: The 2020 conference was scheduled to be held at the University of Bucharest, Romania, but was cancelled as a result of the COVID-19 pandemic.
- 2019: Monash University, Prato Centre, Italy.
- 2018: Universitat Rovira i Virgili, Tarragona, Spain
- 2017: University of Gdańsk, Poland.
- 2016: University of Lisbon, Portugal.
- 2015: Newcastle University, England.
- 2014: Charles University, Prague, Czech Republic.
- 2013: New Lanark, Scotland.
- 2012: Universitat Rovira i Virgili, Tarragona, Spain.
- 2011: University of Cyprus, Republic of Cyprus.
- 2010: Maria Curie-Sklodowska University, Lublin, Poland.
- 2009: University of Porto, Portugal.
- 2008: University of Limerick, Ireland.
- 2007: University of Plymouth, England.
- 2006: Universitat Rovira i Virgili, Tarragona, Spain.
- 2005: New Lanark, Scotland.
- 2004: University of Porto, Portugal.
- 2003: European University of Madrid, Spain.
- 2002: University of Nottingham, England.
- 2000: University of Nottingham, England.
- 1999: University of East Anglia, England.

The 2023 conference is scheduled to be held at the Babes-Bolyai University in Cluj/Kolozsvár, Romania.

A number of significant publications have arisen from these conferences.

== Awards ==
At its 2019 conference the Society conferred a Distinguished Service Award on Professor Darko Suvin, its Guest of Honour and Keynote Speaker.

At its 2021 conference the Society conferred a Lifetime Achievement Award on Professor Lyman Tower Sargent.
