= Tom Moylan =

Thomas Patrick Moylan (born 26 December 1943) is an American-Irish academic, literary and cultural critic, Professor Emeritus in the Department of Language, Literature, Communication and Culture at the University of Limerick. Moylan's academic interests are in utopian studies and critical theory, science fiction studies, cultural studies, American studies, and Irish studies.

== Utopia, dystopia and science fiction ==
Moylan is best known for his much-cited theory of the 'critical utopia', outlined in Demand the Impossible (1986). Here he argued that the new American science-fictional utopias of the 1970s were 'critical' in the double sense of Enlightenment critique and of the 'critical mass' required to produce an explosion. These texts were distinctive because they rejected utopia as 'blueprint', but nonetheless preserved it as 'dream'. They therefore focused on the conflict between utopias and their 'originary world' and on 'the continuing presence of difference and imperfection' within utopia. The result was a more plausible, because recognisable and dynamic, set of alternative possibilities. 'In resisting the flattening out of utopian writing in modern society,' he concluded, 'the critical utopia has destroyed, preserved, and transformed that writing and marks the first important output of utopian discourse since the 1890s'. Moylan's examples included Ernest Callenbach's Ecotopia, Sally Miller Gearhart's The Wanderground, Suzy McKee Charnas's Motherlines and Dorothy Bryant's The Kin of Ata are Waiting for You. But his primary focus fell on Joanna Russ's The Female Man, Ursula K. Le Guin's The Dispossessed, Marge Piercy's Woman on the Edge of Time and Samuel R. Delany's Triton. These texts have become something like a canon for American SF studies.

In Scraps of the Untainted Sky (2000) Moylan developed the parallel concept of the 'critical dystopia'. Critical dystopias, he explained, 'burrow within the dystopian tradition', but do so only 'in order to bring utopian and dystopian tendencies to bear on their exposé of the present moment'. They are thus 'stubbornly' utopian, in the sense that they do not move easily toward their own better worlds: 'Rather, they linger in the terrors of the present even as they exemplify what is needed to transform it'. Moylan insisted that this was an essentially recent development, specific to the late 1980s and early 1990s.

== Selected bibliography ==
- Moylan, T. (2020) Becoming Utopian: The Culture and Politics of Radical Transformation London: Bloomsbury.
- Moylan, T. (2014) Demand the Impossible: Science Fiction and the Utopian Imagination Ralahine Utopian Classic, ed. R. Baccolini, Oxford and Bern: Peter Lang.
- Moylan, T. and R. Baccolini (eds) (2007) Utopia-Method-Vision: The Use Value of Social Dreaming Oxford and Bern: Peter Lang.
- Griffin, M.J. and T. Moylan (eds) (2007) Exploring the Utopian Impulse: Essay on the Terrain of the Utopian Imagination Oxford and Bern: Peter Lang.
- Moylan, T. and R. Baccolini (eds) (2004) Dark Horizons: Science Fiction and the Dystopian Imagination New York and London: Routledge.
- Moylan, T. (2000) Scraps of the Untainted Sky: Science Fiction, Utopia, Dystopia Boulder and Oxford: Westview Press.
- Moylan, T. and J.O. Daniel (eds) (1997) Not Yet: Reconsidering Ernst Bloch London and New York: Verso.
- Moylan, T. (1986) Demand the Impossible: Science Fiction and the Utopian Imagination London and New York: Methuen.

== Honors ==
In 2008 Moylan was awarded the Lyman Tower Sargent Distinguished Scholar Award by the North American Society for Utopian Studies.

In 2017 Moylan was awarded the Pilgrim Award for lifetime contributions to Science Fiction and Fantasy scholarship by the Science Fiction Research Association.
