= Ruth Levitas =

British sociologist

Ruth Levitas (born 15 May 1949 in London) is emeritus Professor in the Department of Sociology at the University of Bristol. She is well known internationally for her research on utopia and utopian studies.

Her book, The Concept of Utopia (1990, Revised 2010), addresses the notion of the ideal society throughout European history. Utopia as Method: The Imaginary Reconstitution of Society (2013), makes the case that 'utopia should be understood as a method rather than a goal.' She has formulated a program of sociology which is fundamentally utopian-focused in conventional sociological discourse.

In The Inclusive Society?: Social Exclusion and New Labour (2005), Levitas introduced the idea of social exclusion as part of the new political language. She also introduced the concepts of MUD (the moral underclass discourse), SID (the social integration discourse), and RED (the redistribution discourse), as tools for analysing social exclusion.

== Honors ==
In 2012 Levitas was awarded the Lyman Tower Sargent Distinguished Scholar Award by the North American Society for Utopian Studies.
