= H. G. Wells Society =

Organization

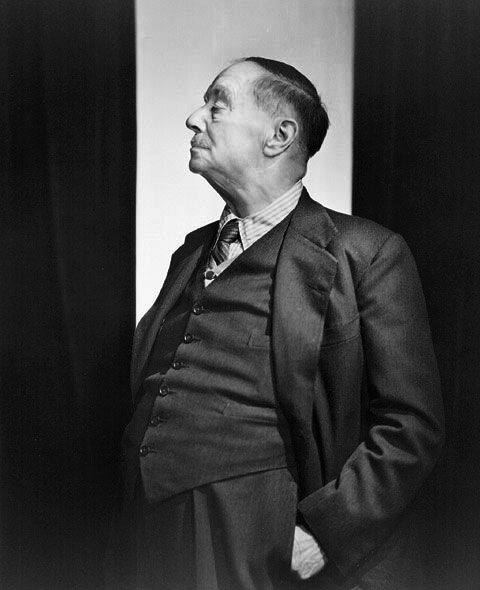
H. G. Wells in 1943

There have been two groups called the H. G. Wells Society, both set up to support the ideas of Herbert George Wells (1866–1946).

== 1930s group ==
The first H. G. Wells Society was set up in 1934 to promote Wells's political ideas. Its members included Gerald Heard, Olaf Stapledon, Sylvia Pankhurst, Eden Paul and Vera Brittain. Its first public meeting was held on 15 May 1934 at Caxton Hall with Pankhurst, Stapledon and Gerald Heard as speakers. By the end of 1934 Stapledon began to believe that the Society was not "going to be an effective force" and Wells himself was dismissive of it, expressing pleasure when it eventually disbanded.

The group later changed its name to Cosmopolis, then the Open Conspiracy. In 1936, it merged with the Federation of Progressive Societies and Individuals.

== Later group ==
The later H. G. Wells Society, founded in 1960, is an international association composed of people interested in the life, work and thought of Wells and encouraging a wider interest in his writings and ideas. The Society has published a comprehensive bibliography of Wells's published works, and has printed the following other publications, several of which were works by Wells which had previously been out of print for many years:

- H. G. Wells, The Last Books of H. G. Wells: The Happy Turning and Mind at the End of its Tether, ed. G. P. Wells (1982).
- H. G. Wells Society, A Comprehensive Bibliography, foreword by Kingsley Martin (1985).
- H. G. Wells, The Discovery of the Future with The Commonsense of World Peace and The Human Adventure, ed. Patrick Parrinder (1989).
- H. G. Wells, Select Conversations with an Uncle (Now Extinct) with Two Hitherto Unreprinted Conversations, ed. David C. Smith and Patrick Parrinder, foreword by Michael Foot (1992).
- John Hammond, The H. G. Wells Society: A Short History (2000).
- H. G. Wells, The Betterave Papers, ed. John Hammond (2001).
- James Dilloway, Human Rights and World Order, 2nd edn (1998).

The Society's objective is "to promote and encourage universally an active interest in, and appreciation of, the life, work and thought of Herbert George Wells".

Its specific aims are:

- To encourage a greater interest in the works of H. G. Wells on the part of publishing, press and broadcasting organisations.
- To promote a wider knowledge of the ideas and ideals of H. G. Wells and to assist in promoting their understanding and dissemination.
- To organise lectures, meetings and conferences, to issue publications, and to engage in such other educational work as will assist towards the realisation of the Society's aims.

Each year the Society organises a conference, either in-person or on Zoom, where aspects of Wells's life and work are discussed. All members receive a biannual newsletter, edited by Eric Jukes and an annual journal, entitled The Wellsian edited by Dr. Bill Cooke.

Over the years, the Society has accumulated a substantial collection of books and pamphlets by Wells, and an archive of press cuttings relating to Wells. In 2012 the Society donated 160 volumes from its collection to enhance the H. G. Wells Collection at Senate House Library, University of London. The Society is also closely associated with the Wells Collections at the University of Illinois at Urbana–Champaign and Bromley Central Library, South London, the former being the repository of the Wells papers.

The Society was founded by the late Dr. John Hammond, who served as president for many years. It has also boasted a number of distinguished vice-presidents through the years including Arthur C. Clarke, Michael Foot, Brian Aldiss, Christopher Priest, Stephen Baxter, and Claire Tomalin.

== See also ==
- Invasion literature
- Fabian Society
- Cosmotheism
- Noosphere
- Omega Point

== Sources ==
- Information leaflets & Newsletters published by the H. G. Wells Society
- The Wellsian, official journal, annually published by the H. G. Wells Society
