= Gregory Claeys =

British political theorist

Gregory Claeys (born 18 August 1953) is Professor Emeritus of History at the University of London.

== Career ==
He gained his PhD at the University of Cambridge, where he studied at Jesus College, and was a Junior Research Associate (1981–83) at King's College, working on the "Political Economy and Society" project. From 1982 to 1987 he taught British and American studies at Universität Hannover (now Leibniz University Hannover) in Hannover, then West Germany. Then he was Associate Professor of History at Washington University in St. Louis. From 1992 to 2020 he was Professor at Royal Holloway, University of London. His interests are the history of radicalism and socialism in 19th century Britain, utopianism 1700–2100, Social Darwinism and Eugenics, and British intellectual history c. 1750 to the present. From the beginning of his career his research interests have focused chiefly upon the theory and practice of sociability. His main concern now is catastrophic environmental destruction, and how to avoid it.

He has lectured widely, including (2011, 2018) at the Edinburgh International Book Festival and the Oxford Literary Festival, in 2016 at the Cheltenham Literature Festival, and in 2018–19 at similar events at Winchester, Chichester and Lewes. He gave a TEDx talk entitled "My Road to Utopia" (now retitled) at Linz in 2019, and another called "After Consumerism: Utopianism for a Dying Planet" at TEDxGoodenoughCollege in 2021. In 2016 he commenced, as editor, the series, "Palgrave Studies in Utopianism" (Palgrave-Macmillan).

== Honors ==
In 1995 Claeys was given the Distinguished Scholars Award by the Communal Studies Association. In 2002 he was given the Lyman Tower Sargent Distinguished Scholar Award by the North American Society for Utopian Studies. In 2015 he was elected to the Academia Europaea/The European Academy. In 2016 he was elected Chair of the Utopian Studies Society (Europe). In June 2018 he was awarded the Cantemir Prize by HRH Prince Radu of Romania at a ceremony held at Peles Castle, Sinaia. He was a Fellow of the Royal Historical Society and is a Fellow of the Royal Society of Arts. He has been visiting professor at the Australian National University, Canberra (1993), Keio University (Tokyo) (1995), the University of Hanoi (2008), and Peking University (2009, 2011).

== Works ==
- (as editor) Robert Owen. A New View of Society and Other Writings. Penguin Books. 1991.
- Machinery, Money and the Millennium: From Moral Economy to Socialism, 1815–1860. Princeton University Press. 1987.
- (as co-editor, with Liselotte Glage) Radikalismus in Literatur und Gesellschaft des 19. Jahrhunderts (Aspekte der englischen Geistes- und Kulturgeschichte Bd. 11). Bern: Peter Lang Verlag. 1987.
- (as editor) Der soziale Liberalismus John Stuart Mills. Wissenschaftliche Reihe der Friedrich-Naumann-Stiftung. Baden-Baden: Nomos Verlag. 1989.
- Claeys, Gregory (1989). Thomas Paine: Social and Political Thought. Unwin Hyman. ISBN 978-0-04-445090-0.
- Claeys, Gregory (1989). Citizens and Saints. Politics and Anti-Politics in Early British Socialism. Cambridge University Press. ISBN 978-0-521-89276-6.
- (as editor) Thomas Paine: Rights of Man. Indianapolis: Hackett Publishing Co. 1992. ISBN 978-0-87220-147-7.
- (as editor) The Selected Works of Robert Owen. Pickering and Chatto. 1993.
- (as editor) Claeys, Gregory (1994). Utopias of the British Enlightenment. Cambridge University Press. ISBN 978-0-521-45590-9.
- "The Origins of the Rights of Labor: Republicanism, Commerce, and the Construction of Modern Social Theory in Britain, 1796–1805", The Journal of Modern History Vol. 66, No. 2, June 1994
- (as editor) Claeys, Gregory (1995). The Politics of English Jacobinism: Writings of John Thelwall. Penn State Press. ISBN 978-0-271-02591-9.
- (as editor) Political Writings of the 1790s. Pickering and Chatto. 1995.
- (as editor) Modern British Utopias. c. 1700–1850. Pickering and Chatto. 1997.
- (as co-editor, with Lyman Tower Sargent) The Utopia Reader. New York University Press. 1999. (2nd edn, 2017)
- (as co-editor, with Lyman Tower Sargent and Roland Schaer. Utopia. The Search for the Ideal Society in the West (New York: Oxford University Press, 2000).
- (as editor) Restoration and Augustan British Utopias. Syracuse University Press. 2000.
- (as editor) The Chartist Movement in Great Britain. Pickering and Chatto. 2001.
- (as editor) The Routledge Encyclopedia of Nineteenth-Century Thought. Routledge. 2004.
- (as editor) The Owenite Socialist Movement: Pamphlets and Correspondence. 10 vols. Routledge. 2005.
- (as co-editor, with Patrick Parrinder) H. G. Wells. A Modern Utopia. Penguin Books. 2005. ISBN 9780141441122.
- The French Revolution Debate in Britain. Palgrave Macmillan. 2007.
- (as editor) Late Victorian Utopias. Pickering and Chatto. 2009.
- Imperial Sceptics: British Critics of Empire, 1850–1920. Cambridge University Press, 2010.
- (as editor) The Cambridge Companion to Utopian Literature. Cambridge University Press, 2010.
- Searching for Utopia: the History of an Idea. Thames & Hudson, 2011 (German, Spanish, Portuguese, Persian, Japanese, Chinese editions]. (2nd edn, 2020, with the title, Utopia: The History of an Idea)
- (as co-editor, with Gareth Stedman Jones) The Cambridge History of Nineteenth-Century Political Thought. Cambridge University Press, 2011. Spanish and Chinese edns.
- Mill and Paternalism. Cambridge University Press, 2013.
- Dystopia: A Natural History. Oxford University Press, 2017.
- Marx and Marxism. Penguin Books, 2018; Nation Books 2018; Chinese, Greek, Italian, and Korean editions.
- (as editor) The Cambridge Companion to Nineteenth-Century Thought, Cambridge University Press, 2019.
- Utopianism for a Dying Planet: Life After Consumerism. Princeton University Press, 2022.
- John Stuart Mill. A Very Short Introduction. Oxford University Press, 2022.
- (as editor) The Cambridge Companion to Dystopian Literature. Cambridge University Press (forthcoming)
- (as general editor) Thomas Paine: Collected Writings, Princeton University Press 6 vols, 2026
