= Extremism in America: A Reader =

- Author: Lyman Tower Sargent
- Language: English
- Genre: Anthology
- Published: 1995 (New York University Press)
- Publication place: United States
- ISBN: 978-0814780114
- OCLC: 32199564

Extremism in America: A Reader is a book edited by Lyman Tower Sargent (a professor of political science). It is an anthology presenting various political, economic and social ideas, creeds and platforms of people and groups which Sargent labels left-wing or right-wing American extremists as displayed in his selection of their documents.

It was published by New York University Press in 1995 as a 385-page hardcover (ISBN 0-8147-7978-6) and paperback (ISBN 0-8147-8011-3).

Extremism in America received a generally positive reception, garnering reviews from the Los Angeles Times, The Washington Post, and The Times Literary Supplement.

== See also ==
- Empowering local partners to prevent violent extremism in the United States
- Jihadist extremism in the United States
