= The Politics of Autonomy in Latin America =

2015 book on social and political science

The Politics of Autonomy in Latin America: The Art of Organizing Hope
- Author: Ana Cecilia Dinerstein
- Subject: Sociology, political science, economic policy
- Publisher: Springer Science+Business Media
- Publication date: December 22, 2014
- Pages: 282
- ISBN: 9781137316011

The Politics of Autonomy in Latin America: The Art of Organizing Hope is a non-fiction book by Argentine-British sociologist Ana Cecilia Dinerstein. It was published by Palgrave Macmillan in 2015.

== Outline ==
The book offers a critical review and re-conceptualization of practicing autonomy, in light of social movement experiences that emerged in Latin America towards the end of the 20th century. Author Dinerstein argues that conventional understandings of autonomous social movements, such as fighting against power or striving for social change outside of traditional political parties, are insufficient to grasp their implications for bringing about radical social change in the 21st century.

The Politics of Autonomy in Latin America is grounded in Marxist schools of thought and draws on theories of the mid-20th century German philosopher Ernst Bloch, particularly his understanding of reality as an open process, described in The Principle of Hope as the human anthropological impulse to explore what is "not yet". This framework offers a conceptualization of autonomy as a "Figurative politics praxis" entailing four simultaneous modes of negation, creation, contradiction, and excess. These four modes of autonomous praxis are developed in the text in light of the experiences of the Zapatista uprising in 1994, the unemployed worker's movement in Argentina in 2001–2002, the indigenous movements in Bolivia between 2000 and 2005, and landless workers' movements (MST) in Brazil.

The re-conceptualization of autonomy presented in this text is one of a multifaceted process of prefiguration. This concept aims to transcend the political and theoretical cul-de-sacs in which theorists and activists are "forced to opt for either autonomy or state; for taking power or remaining marginal... and ultimately for ending up with either integration or rebellion," while simultaneously avoiding the limitations of "fatalist critique or naïve optimism that too often pervade debates on autonomy."

== Reception ==
The Politics of Autonomy is described by Adam Fishwick as a "truly significant contribution not just to academic thinking on the subject of autonomy, but to the potential of making it – of operationalizing it – in practice". Ryan A. Knight called it "a much-needed alimentation for the radical imagination". David Bailey called it "a major contribution to minor Marxism". In the journal Radical Philosophy, Jeff Webber praised the book's "genuinely novel arguments that adjust our horizons from 'autonomy and the state' to the prefigurative potential of social movements in a Blochian frame of hope". However, he questioned Dinerstein's insistence that such movements are inherently suspicious of the state and "reject state power in principle", suggesting that her position "flattens out the region's much more complex concrete history... and is difficult to sustain empirically".

In 2016, Belgian artist collective Victoria Deluxe and twelve other organizations from the cultural sector, academia, the media, and civil society in Belgium developed a European research project, The Art of Organizing Hope (TAOH), named after the subtitle of the book, which they directly cite as their inspiration. Their stated goal was "to find and discover ideas, collaborations, practices, and structures around Europe that might foster a different societal order". The culmination of the project was a four-day New Narratives for Europe summit held in multiple venues in Ghent, Belgium, 8-11 November, 2018.

In 2018, the Center for the Study of Rural Development (CEDER), an educational NGO in Zautla-Ixtacamaxtitlán, Puebla, Mexico, ran a summer school around the idea of Art of Organizing Hope for 70 MSc students and local leaders.
