= Phillip E. Wegner =

English academic

Phillip E. Wegner is a professor in the Department of English and the Marston-Milbauer Eminent Scholar in English at the University of Florida.

== Career ==
Phillip E. Wegner earned his Bachelor of Arts in Honors English, summa cum laude, at California State University, Northridge in 1986. He earned his PhD from the Literature Program at Duke University in 1993, where he studied under the preeminent Marxist critic Fredric Jameson. He began working as a professor of English at the University of Florida in 1994 and was appointed the Marston-Milbauer Eminent Scholar Professorship in 2012. From 2009 to 2012 he served as the graduate program coordinator. He was awarded the College of Liberal Arts and Sciences Teacher of the Year award in 1996 and 2000.

Professor Wegner has published five books and numerous articles on utopian fiction, contemporary literature, film, cultural studies, Marxism, and science fiction.

== Academic interests ==
Wegner's scholarship is often centered on questions of periodization, particularly in relation to the scholarship of Fredric Jameson, who Wegner has called "the most significant contemporary theorist of periodization." For example, his book Life Between Two Deaths examines the "specific cultural period" of the 1990s, which Wegner argues stretches from the fall of the Berlin Wall in 1989 to September 11, 2001.

Wegner has also written extensively about utopia. In his first book, Imaginary Communities, Wegner argues that the history of the utopian genre is "inseparable from a history of modernity in which the works comprising this important genre play such a significant role." In Shockwaves of Possibility, Wegner makes a similar argument about utopia and the genre of science fiction, arguing that "Utopianism is not simply one among a range of possible themes or motifs in modern science fiction... Rather, Utopianism is fundamental to the very narrative dynamic of this vital modern practice." In addition to his academic research on Utopia, Wegner served as president of the Society for Utopian Studies from 2010 to 2014.

== Bibliography ==
=== Books ===
- Invoking Hope: Theory and Utopia in Dark Times. Minnesota: University of Minnesota Press, 2020.
- Periodizing Jameson: Dialectics, the University, and the Desire for Narrative. Evanston: Northwestern University Press, 2014.
- Shockwaves of Possibility: Essays on Science Fiction, Globalization, and Utopia. Oxford: Peter Lang (publisher), 2014.
- Robert C. Elliott. The Shape of Utopia: Studies in a Literary Genre. Edited by Phillip E. Wegner. Oxford: Peter Lang (publisher), 2013.
- Life between Two Deaths, 1989-2001: U.S. Culture in the Long Nineties. Durham: Duke University Press, 2009.
- Imaginary Communities: Utopia the Nation, and the Spatial Histories of Modernity. Berkeley: University of California Press, 2002.

=== Select Articles and Chapters ===
- “On Althusser’s Not Un-usefulness (Notes toward an Investigation).” Mediations 30, no. 2 (2017).
- “The Economics of Terminator Genisys.” Science Fiction Film and Television 10, no. 1 (2017): 115–124.
- “‘The Great Sea Voyage which Marriage Can Be’: Repetition, Love, and Concrete Utopia in 50 First Dates.” Minnesota Review 8 (2016): 81-100.
- “Introduction: Marxism and Utopia…Again.” Minnesota Review 86 (2016): 57–60.
- “The Possibilities of the Novel: A Look Back on the James-Wells Debate.” The Henry James Review 36, no. 3 (2015): 267–79.
- “Things as They Were or Are: On Russell Banks’s Global Realisms.” In Reading Capitalist Realism, edited by Alison Shonkwiler and Leigh Claire La Berge, 89–112. University of Iowa Press, 2014.
- “The Ends of Culture; or, Late Modernism, Redux.” In Literary Materialisms, edited by Mathias Nilges and Emilio Sauri, 241–257. New York: Palgrave Macmillan, 2013.
- “Hegel or Spinoza (or Hegel); Spinoza and Marx.” Mediations 25, no. 2 (2012).
- “Lacan avec Greimas: Formalization, Theory, and the ‘Other Side’ of the Study of Culture.” Minnesota Review 77 (2011): 62-86.
- “Alan Moore, ‘Secondary Literacy,’ and the Modernism of the Graphic Novel.” ImageTexT 5, no. 3 (2010).
- “The Beat Cops of History; or, the Paranoid Style in American Intellectual Politics.” Arizona Quarterly, 66, no. 2 (2010): 149–67.
- “Emerging from the Flood in Which We Are Sinking; or, Reading with Darko Suvin (Again).” Preface to Defined by a Hollow: Essays on Utopia, Science Fiction, and Political Epistemology, xv-xxxviii. Darko Suvin, Oxford: Peter Lang, 2010.
- “‘An Unfinished Project that was Also a Missed Opportunity’: Utopia and Alternate History in Hayao Miyazaki's My Neighbor Totoro.” Special issue: “Animé and Utopia.” ImageTexT 5, no. 2 (2010).
- “Greimas avec Lacan; or, From the Symbolic to the Real in Dialectical Criticism.” Criticism 51, no. 2 (2009): 211–45.
- “Ken MacLeod's Permanent Revolution: Utopian Possible Worlds, History, and the Augenblick in the ‘Fall Revolution’.” In Red Planets: Marxism and Science Fiction, edited by Mark Bould and China Miéville, 137-155. Pluto Press/Wesleyan University Press, 2009.
- “Learning to Live in History: Alternate Historicities and the 1990s in The Years of Rice and Salt.” In Kim Stanley Robinson Maps the Unimaginable: Critical Essays, edited by William J. Burling, 98–112. MacFarland, 2009.
- “Recognizing the Patterns.” New Literary History 38, no. 1 (2007): 183–200.
- “October 3, 1951 to September 11, 2001: Periodizing the Cold War in DeLillo’s Underworld.” In “Neorealism: Between Innovation and Continuation,” eds. Thomas Claviez and Maria Moss. Amerikastudien/American Studies 49, no. 1 (2004): 51-63.
- “Where the Prospective Horizon is Omitted: Naturalism and Dystopia in Fight Club and Ghost Dog.” In Dark Horizons: Science Fiction and the Dystopian Imagination, edited by. Tom Moylan and Raffaella Baccolini, 167-185. London: Routledge, 2003.
- “‘A Nightmare on the Brain of the Living': Messianic Historicity, Alienations, and Independence Day.” Rethinking Marxism 12. no 1 (2000): 65-86.
- “The Last Bomb: Historicizing History in Terry Bisson’s Fire on the Mountain and Gibson and Sterling’s The Difference Engine.” The Comparatist 23 (1999): 141–151.
- “‘Life as He Would Have It:’ The Invention of India in Kipling's Kim.” Cultural Critique no. 26 (1994): 129- 159.
- “On Zamyatin's We: A Critical Map of Utopia's ‘Possible Worlds’.” Utopian Studies 4, no. 2 (1993): 94–116.
