= Alan N. Shapiro =

American science fiction theorist (born 1956)

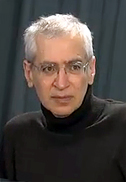
- Born: 23 April 1956 (age 70); Brooklyn, New York
- Education: MIT; Cornell University; New York University
- Known for: Changed public perceptions of Star Trek, Changed public perceptions of Baudrillard, Introduced idea of Dialogical Artificial Intelligence
- Scientific career
- Fields: Science fiction studies, Media theory, Technological art, Artificial intelligence, Transdisciplinary design, posthumanism
- Doctoral advisor: Martin Butler

Alan N. Shapiro (born 23 April 1956) is an American science fiction and media theorist. He is a lecturer and essayist in the fields of science fiction studies, media theory, posthumanism, French philosophy, creative coding, technological art, sociology of culture, software theory, robotics, artificial intelligence, and futuristic and transdisciplinary design. His work emphasises the deep presence of media theory in science fiction and vice versa. Shapiro's book and other published writings on Star Trek have contributed to a change in public perception about the importance of Star Trek for contemporary culture. His published essays on Jean Baudrillard - especially in the International Journal of Baudrillard Studies - have contributed to a change in public perception about the importance of Baudrillard's work for culture, philosophy, sociology, and design.

Shapiro has contributed many essays to the journal of technology and society NoemaLab — on technological art, software theory, Computer Science 2.0, futuristic design, the political philosophy of the information society, and Baudrillard and the Situationists.

== Career ==
Shapiro has been visiting professor in the Department of Film and New Media at the NABA (Nuova Accademia di Belle Arti) University of Arts and Design in Milan.

He has also been a lecturer at the Goethe University in Frankfurt, at the Art and Design Universities in Offenbach (where he taught creative coding and futuristic design from 2012 to 2015) and Karlsruhe; at the Institute of Time-Based Media at the University of the Arts, Berlin; at Domus Academy of Design and Fashion in Milan; and at ABADIR Design Academy in Catania.

From October 2015 to September 2017, Shapiro was visiting professor of Transdisciplinary Design in the Department of Industrial Design at the Folkwang University of the Arts, Essen.

Since October 2017, Shapiro is a lecturer in media theory at the Art University of Bremen, and teaches design and informatics at the University of Applied Sciences, Lucerne, Switzerland.

Shapiro is also a software developer, with nearly 20 years of industry experience in C++ and Java development. He has worked on several projects for Volkswagen, Deutsche Bahn (DB Systel), and media and telecommunications companies.

=== Publications ===
Shapiro's book Decoding Digital Culture with Science Fiction: Hyper-Modernism, Hyperreality and Posthumanism was published by the Transcript Verlag in June 2024. The book is distributed in North America by the Columbia University Press.

Shapiro's book Venice in Las Vegas: An American and European Auto-Socio-Biography, 1960s to 1980s was published by the Peter Lang International Academic Publishers in October 2025.

Shapiro is the editor and translator of The Technological Herbarium by Gianna Maria Gatti, a groundbreaking book about technological art. He has three contributions to the innovative book on social choreography Framemakers: Choreography as an Aesthetics of Change edited by Jeffrey Gormly.

His book Software of the Future: The Model Precedes the Real was published in German by the Walther König Verlag in 2014.

His edited book Transdisciplinary Design was published by the Passagen Verlag in 2017.

He has chapters in the books Design und Mobilität: wie werden wir bewegt sein? (2019), Nevertheless: Manifestos and Digital Culture (2018), Searching for Heterotopia (2019), and Tracelation (2018).

Shapiro has published several widely cited essays on the disaster of Donald Trump in relation to hyper-modernism. In 2019, he published an influential essay on Dialogical Artificial Intelligence in the magazine of the German national cultural foundation. He has lectured several times on the meaning of Patrick McGoohan's TV show The Prisoner.

The 2017 Audi Annual Report features a discussion about the impact of AI on society between Shapiro, Audi CEO Rupert Stadler, and David Hanson of Hanson Robotics, Hong Kong.

Shapiro has also been featured as a thinker by Bertellsmann in "We Magazine", by Deutsche Bank in "Economy Stories," and in the technology and fashion print magazine WU (Milan).

=== Science fiction ===
In a 10-page review-essay of his book Star Trek: Technologies of Disappearance, the journal Science Fiction Studies called his book one of the most original works in the field of science fiction theory. See also the extensive discussions of Star Trek: Technologies of Disappearance in Csicsery-Ronay's major reference work on science fiction studies, in The Routledge Companion to Science Fiction and in The Yearbook of English Studies.

== Education ==
Shapiro was accepted at age 15 as an undergraduate student at the Massachusetts Institute of Technology (MIT). He studied at MIT for 2 years. He received his B.A. from Cornell University, where he studied government and European Intellectual History. He has an M.A. in sociology from New York University (NYU). In April 2024, he was awarded a Ph.D. in Artistic and Media Research from the Faculty of Language and Cultural Studies of the Carl von Ossietzky University of Oldenburg, Germany.
