= Utopian Studies =

- Discipline: Utopianism
- Language: English
- Edited by: Jennifer Wagner-Lawlor

Publication details
- History: 1987-present
- Publisher: Penn State University Press (United States)
- Frequency: Triannual

Standard abbreviations
- ISO 4: Utop. Stud.

Indexing
- ISSN: 1045-991X (print); 2154-9648 (web)
- JSTOR: 1045991X
- OCLC no.: 60618122

Links
- Journal homepage; Online access

Utopian Studies is a peer-reviewed academic journal that publishes articles on utopia and utopianism. The journal is published three times a year by the Penn State University Press on behalf of the Society for Utopian Studies. The editor is Jennifer Wagner-Lawlor of the Pennsylvania State University, in the United States.

Lyman Tower Sargent helped found the publication in 1987.

== See also ==
- Moreana
