= Darko Suvin =

Croatian-Canadian literary critic

- Born: 19 July 1930 (age 96); Zagreb, Kingdom of Yugoslavia

Philosophical work
- Era: 20th-century philosophy
- Region: Western Philosophy
- Main interests: Science fiction
- Notable ideas: Cognitive estrangement

Darko Ronald Suvin (born Darko Šlezinger) is a Canadian academic, writer, critic, and professor emeritus at McGill University. He was born in Zagreb, which at the time was in Kingdom of Yugoslavia, now the capital of Croatia. After teaching at the Department for Comparative Literature at Zagreb University, and writing his first books and poems (in Croatian), he left Yugoslavia in 1967 and started teaching at McGill University in 1968.

He has published copiously on drama and theatre, particularly on Bertolt Brecht and the Noh plays, on SFR Yugoslavia, and on epistemologogy, but is best known for several major works of criticism and literary history devoted to science fiction. He was editor of Science-Fiction Studies from 1973 to 1981. Since his retirement from McGill in 1999, he has lived in Lucca, Italy. He is a Fellow of the Royal Society of Canada.

In 2009, he received the Croatian SFERA Award for lifetime achievement in science fiction. He is also a member of the Croatian Writers Society (HDP).

In 2016, Suvin published a series of memoirs in the Croatian cultural journal Gordogan on his youth as a member of the League of Communist Youth of Yugoslavia during the Nazi occupation of Croatia and Yugoslavia and the first years of Josip Tito's Yugoslavia. His 2016 book Splendour, Misery, and Potentialities: An X-ray of Socialist Yugoslavia (published in translation as Samo jednom se ljubi: radiografija SFR Jugoslavije in Belgrade in 2014), an attempt at a dialectical history of the Socialist Federal Republic of Yugoslavia, is widely cited in the field of post-Yugoslav studies.

== Biography ==
=== Early life ===
Suvin was born in Zagreb, Kingdom of Yugoslavia, on July 19, 1930, to Miroslav and Truda (née Weiser) Šlezinger, a Croatian Jewish couple. In Zagreb he attended the Jewish elementary school on Palmotićeva Street. In 1939 his family changed their surname from Šlezinger to Suvin due to the political situation and antisemitic Nazi propaganda. In the early 1940s, before the end of World War II, a Nazi bomb exploded close to Suvin, an event that piqued his interest in science fiction when he realized that in even a slightly alternative world, he might have been killed then. Many members of his family died during The Holocaust, including his paternal grandparents Lavoslav and Josipa Šlesinger.

=== Interest in literature ===
After World War II, Suvin earned his PhD from Zagreb University. Before this, he published his first scholarly article, a brief overview of the science fiction genre, and his first poems in Croatian literary language. He translated some science fiction books and stories into Croatian, including The Seedling Stars and The Day of the Triffids.

In Yugoslavia during the early 1960s, Suvin published his first book, a historical introduction and general overview of the science fiction genre. In it, he discusses in detail the works of Isaac Asimov, Robert A. Heinlein, and others and analyzes several science fiction books. The book also includes the results of his first article initially published in 1957.

=== Move to North America ===
In 1967, Suvin emigrated to North America. Suvin was hired at the Department of English, McGill University in Montreal in 1968, teaching mainly drama and science fiction . About five years later, the number of students signing up for science fiction courses dropped significantly, leaving him to teach English and literature courses. Through his teaching career, he has published numerous works and contributed to the study of science fiction. In 1999, Suvin retired and moved to Italy, where he continues to live.

== Awards ==
- SFERA Award for lifetime achievement, 2009.
- Society for Utopian Studies Lyman Tower Sargent Award for Distinguished Scholarship, 2013.
- Utopian Studies Society Distinguished Service Award, 2019.

== Philosophy ==
=== Science fiction ===
According to Suvin, works of science fiction begin with the idea of framing a hypothesis – the novum, a Latin coinage meaning "a new strange newness" that he introduced in the 1972 essay "On the Poetics of the Science Fiction Genre" in College English. The most common of these hypotheses is likely time travel, although there are many distinct alternate realities used in books and movies that do not utilize time travel as a hypothesis. It is Suvin's opinion that some of the most commercially successful works of science fiction have only used this idea of framing a hypothesis as an ornament, and are therefore not truly SF at heart – they simply are taking advantage of the special effects and uniqueness that go along with the genre.

=== Cognitive estrangement ===
In Suvin's opinion, the focus of science fiction lies in encouraging new ways of thinking about human society, or inspiring those who are oppressed to resist. Suvin has labeled this idea of subversive thinking as "cognitive estrangement". Those works of science fiction that could be characterized as using cognitive estrangement rely on no single specific hypothesis, but instead on the cognitive presentation of alternative realities that directly contradict the status quo.

== Bibliography ==
=== Works ===
- Dva vida dramaturgije: eseji o teatarskoj viziji (Zagreb: Studentski centar Sveučilišta u Zagrebu, 1964) — "Two aspects of dramaturgy: essays on theatrical vision"
- Od Lukijana do Lunjika (Zagreb: Epoha, 1965) — "From Lucian to Lunik", anthology and theory of science fiction. Major parts of this book and other early essays, published in the 1960s in Croatian, were later reworked for Metamorphoses of Science Fiction.
- Other Worlds, Other Seas: Science Fiction Stories From Socialist Countries, selected and edited with preface and notes (New York: Random House, 1970). German edition 1972; French 1973; Dutch 1976; Japanese 1976, Spanish 1981.
- Uvod u Brechta (Zagreb: Skolska Knjiga, 1970) — "Introduction into Brecht"
- Russian Science Fiction, 1956–1970: A Bibliography (Toronto SFWA conference, 1971). Revised second edition published by Dragon Press in 1976 as Russian Science Fiction, 1956–1974: A Bibliography.
- Science-Fiction Studies: Selected Articles on Science Fiction, 1973–1975 (Boston: Gregg Press, 1976) — edited with R. D. Mullen
- Dramatika Iva Vojnovića: geneza i struktura (Dubrovnik, vol. 20, issue 5–6, 1977) — "Ivo Vojnovic's Dramatics: Genesis and Structure", a reprint in the magazine's whole issue of Suvin's PhD from University of Zagreb.
- H. G. Wells and Modern Science Fiction (Bucknell University Press, 1977) — edited with Robert M. Philmus
- Science-Fiction Studies: Selected Articles on Science Fiction, 1976–1977 (Boston: Gregg Press, 1978) — edited with R. D. Mullen
- Metamorphoses of Science Fiction: On the Poetics and History of a Literary Genre (Yale University Press, 1979). French edition 1977; German 1979; Spanish 1984; Italian 1985; Japanese 1991; Croatian 2010; Chinese 2011. Expanded edition, ed. Gerry Canavan, 2016.
- Victorian Science Fiction in the UK: The Discourses of Knowledge and of Power (Boston: G.K. Hall, 1983)
- To Brecht and Beyond: Soundings in Modern Dramaturgy (Harvester Press/Barnes & Noble, 1984)
- The Long March, Notes on the Way 1981–1984, Poems (Hounslow Press, 1987)
- Positions and Presuppositions in Science Fiction (Kent State University Press, 1988)
- Armirana Arkadija (Zagreb: Naprijed, 1990) — poems in Croatian
- Lessons of Japan: Assayings of Some Intercultural Stances (Maisonneuve Press, 1997)
- Learning from Other Worlds: Estrangement, Cognition, and the Politics of Science Fiction and Utopia (Liverpool University Press, 2001) — edited by Patrick Parrinder, collection of essays on science fiction and utopian literature honouring the work of Darko Suvin.
- US Science Fiction and War/Militarism (Fictions, Studi sulla narrativita, no. 3, 2004) — special issue in English guest edited with Salvatore Proietti
- Gdje smo? Kuda idemo? Za političku epistemologiju spasa: eseji za orijentaciju i djelovanje u oskudnom vremenu (Zagreb: Hrvatsko filozofsko društvo, 2006) — "Where are we? What are we getting to? For a political epistemology of salvation: essays for the orientation and doing in time of needs", translated from English manuscript with author's supervision. Slovene edition 2010.
- "Of Starship Troopers and Refuseniks: War and Militarism in US Science Fiction, Part 1" (New Boundaries in Political Science Fiction, edited by D.M. Hassler and C. Wilcox, University of South Carolina Press, 2008)
- "Of Starship Troopers and Refuseniks: War and Militarism in US Science Fiction, Part 2" (Extrapolation, vol. 48, no. 1, 2007)
- "Spoznaja, sloboda, The Dispossessed kao klasik" (Ubiq, no. 2, 2008) — "Cognition, Freedom, The Dispossessed as a Classic", Croatian translation with author's supervision
- Naučna fantastika, spoznaja, sloboda (Belgrade: 2009) — "Science fiction, cognition, freedom", in Croatian and Serbian, selected essays on science fiction translated from English manuscripts or printed in Croatian, from 1960s to 2000s; selections from Yugoslav, Croatian and Serbian journals.
- Defined by a Hollow: Essays on Utopia, Science Fiction and Political Epistemology (Peter Lang, 2010) — preface by Phillip E. Wegner
- Darko Suvin, a Life in Letters (Washington: Paradoxa, no. 23, 2011) — edited by Phillip E. Wegner, selected writings and poems
- Preživjeti Potop: fantasy, po-robljenje i granična spoznaja (Ubiq, 2012) — "Surviving the Deluge: fantasy, commodification and liminal cognition", collection of Suvin's recent writings on fantasy.
- In Leviathan's Belly: Essays for a Counter-Revolutionary Time (Borgo Press, 2012)
- Samo jednom se ljubi: radiografija SFR Jugoslavije (Rosa Luxemburg Stiftung South East Europe, 2014) — "You Love Only Once. Radiography of SFR Yugoslavia, 1945–1972", translated into Croatian from English manuscript
- Splendour, Misery, and Potentialities: An X-ray of Socialist Yugoslavia (Brill, 2016) — foreword by Fredric Jameson
- Brechtovo ustvarjanje in horizont komunizma (Ljubljana: MLG, 2016) — "Brecht’s Works and the Horizon of Communism", Slovene edition of essays on Bertold Brecht.
