= Society for Utopian Studies =

North American interdisciplinary association

- Abbreviation: SUS
- Formation: 1975
- Type: Learned society
- Legal status: Active
- Purpose: Study of utopianism in all its forms
- Region served: International
- Methods: Conferences, publications
- Fields: Utopian studies, utopianism, utopian literature, utopian theory, intentional communities
- Members: Yes (scholars, students)
- Official language: English
- Publication: Utopian Studies (journal); Utopus Discovered (newsletter)
- Award: The Lyman Tower Sargent Award for Distinguished Scholarship

The Society for Utopian Studies (founded 1975) is a North American learned society devoted to the study of utopianism in all its forms, with a particular emphasis on literary and experimental utopias. The society meets once a year.

== Publications ==
The society publishes Utopian Studies, a triannual peer-reviewed academic journal, containing scholarly articles on a wide range of subjects related to utopias, utopianism, utopian literature, utopian theory, and intentional communities. The journal's founding editor-in-chief was Lyman Tower Sargent. It also publishes a regular newsletter, Utopus Discovered.

== Award ==
The society awards "The Lyman Tower Sargent Award for Distinguished Scholarship" at irregular intervals. Previous recipients have been:

- 2017: Phillip E. Wegner
- 2013: Vita Fortunati and Darko Suvin
- 2012: Ruth Levitas
- 2010: Ursula K. Le Guin and Peter Fitting
- 2009: Fredric Jameson
- 2008: Tom Moylan and Ken Roemer
- 2002: Gregory Claeys
- 1997: Lyman Tower Sargent
