= Patrick Parrinder =

English academic (born 1944)

Patrick Parrinder (born 1944) is an academic, formerly professor of English at the University of Reading who retired in 2008.

Parrinder was educated at Leighton Park School and Christ's College, Cambridge, where he was taught English by Graham Hough. He has written books of literary criticism on James Joyce and H. G. Wells, and was associate editor of the Oxford Dictionary of National Biography, focusing on literary authors in the period 1890–1920.

He was Vice-President and President of the H.G. Wells Society in London.

He also edited texts of H. G. Wells published by Penguin Classics.
