= Lyman Tower Sargent =

American political scientist and utopian studies scholar

Lyman Tower Sargent (born 9 February 1940) is an American academic and professor emeritus of political science at the University of Missouri-St. Louis. Sargent's main academic interests are utopian studies, political theory, American studies and bibliography. He is one of the world's foremost scholars of utopian studies, founding editor of Utopian Studies, serving in that post for the journal's first fifteen years, and recipient of the Distinguished Scholar Award from the Society for Utopian Studies. Sargent was educated as an undergraduate at Macalester College and a graduate student at the University of Minnesota.

== Career ==
Sargent taught political science at the University of Missouri-St. Louis from 1965 until 2005, when he retired and was appointed professor emeritus. He also held visiting appointments at Royal Holloway and Bedford New College, University of London; Mansfield College, Oxford; Birkbeck College, University of London; and the University of Nottingham.

== Selected bibliography ==
- Lyman Tower Sargent (1969) Contemporary Political Ideologies: A Comparative Analysis. Homewood, Illinois: Dorsey Press, 1969. 14th edition (2009) Belmont, California: Wadsworth/Cengage Learning.
- Lyman Tower Sargent and Thomas A. Zant (1970) Techniques of Political Analysis: An Introduction. Belmont, California: Wadsworth Publishing Company.
- Lyman Tower Sargent (1972) New Left Thought: An Introduction. Homewood, Illinois: Dorsey Press.
- Lyman Tower Sargent (1979) British and American Utopian Literature 1516–1975: An Annotated Bibliography. Boston, Massachusetts: G. K. Hall.
- Lyman Tower Sargent (1988) British and American Utopian Literature, 1516–1985: An Annotated, Chronological Bibliography. New York: Garland.
- Lyman Tower Sargent (ed.) (1990) Contemporary Political Ideologies: A Reader. Pacific Grove, California: Brooks/Cole.
- Lyman Tower Sargent (1994) "The Three Faces of Utopianism Revisited." Utopian Studies Vol. 5, No.1: 1–37.
- Lyman Tower Sargent (ed.) (1995) Extremism in America: A Reader. New York: New York University Press.
- Lyman Tower Sargent (ed.) (1997) Political Thought in the United States: A Documentary History. New York: New York University Press.
- Lyman Tower Sargent and Gregory Claeys (eds) (1999) The Utopia Reader. New York: New York University Press; 2nd edn, 2017.
- Lyman Tower Sargent, Roland Schaer and Gregory Claeys (eds) (2000) Utopia: The Search for the Ideal Society in the Western World. New York: The New York Public Library/Oxford University Press.
- Lyman Tower Sargent and Lucy Sargisson (2004) Living in Utopia: Intentional Communities in New Zealand. Aldershot: Ashgate.
- Lyman Tower Sargent (2010) Utopianism: A Very Short Introduction. Oxford: Oxford University Press.
- Lyman Tower Sargent, Michael Freeden and Marc Stern (eds) The Oxford Handbook of Political Ideologies. Oxford: Oxford University Press.
- Lyman Tower Sargent (2016) Utopian Literature in English: An Annotated Bibliography from 1516 to the Present. State College, PA: Penn State Libraries Open Publishing. Openpublishing.psu.edu/utopia. doi:10.18113/P8WC77
- Lyman Tower Sargent (2017) Lyman Tower Sargent’s Bibliography [of Secondary Literature]. Porto: Advanced Research in Utopian Studies://arus.letras.up.pt/

== Honors ==
In 1997 Sargent was awarded the Distinguished Scholar Award by the North American Society for Utopian Studies. The Award was subsequently renamed in his honor.
