= Judith Clute =

Canadian-British illustrator

Judith Clute (born 1942) is a Canadian painter, graphic designer, print-maker, and illustrator who has created cover art and illustrations for a number of well-known science fiction authors and magazines. Clute has British citizenship and works in London. She is also a tour guide with the Original London Walks.

== Life and career ==
Judith Rosanne Wood James was born in Edmonton, Alberta in 1942, but grew up in Toronto and matriculated from Bishop Strachan School in 1961. In the same year she was invited to be a painting apprentice for two years in Vancouver with Françoise Andre and Charles Stegeman. She married John Clute in 1964 and they moved to Camden Town in London in 1969. From the beginning of her time in London, Clute became involved with the New Arts Lab. In June 1970, she participated in an exhibition with Pamela Zoline entitled "Judith Clute: Diagrams/Similes and Pamela Zoline: Things in the World" at the London New Arts Lab. In the exhibition's press release Clute's paintings were described as having "mount[ed] campaigns against easy reading".

In 1975, for New Worlds, Clute did an India ink illustration for "Daddy's Girl" by Joanna Russ. It marked the beginning of the style she is known for: "constructing things from disparate elements". For the next five decades, Clute continued to produce works in this style, participating in 37 painting exhibitions to date and creating illustrations for a number of well-known science fiction authors and magazines. Interzone #42 (December 1990), an all-female issue, used illustrations by Clute throughout.

In Interzone #188, her artwork was displayed on the cover, and her life and work was discussed in an article entitled "Still Turning Motif's Upside Down" by Paul Brazier. In 2003, Clute acted in the film "A Short Film about John Bolton" directed by Neil Gaiman. In 2018, Clute participated in the pop-up show An Arts Lab Continuum at Spitalfields Studios, with six of the other artists who had been involved in the 1960s and early 1970s in the arts labs of Drury Lane and Robert Street. In December 2019, Clute did a radio interview with Chiara Ambrosio for "The Raft, a London Story" on Resonance radio, 104.4 fm.

== Reception ==
In 2006, Farah Mendlesohn compiled a festschrift for John and Judith Clute entitled Polder: A Festschrift for John Clute and Judith Clute, saying in the book's introduction: "Judith Clute has been referred to as a fantasy artist. Within the genre this tends to conjure up images of fantasy illustration, but Judith's work is not an illustration of fantasy, but part of the fantastic genre itself … Judith turns the world around, exposes the mimetic as gloriously unnatural." Later on in the book Candas Jane Dorsey comments that Clute "sees the world with that fresh, slightly sideways glance that imposes no filters, and draws no foregone conclusions. As a result of combining that directness of observation with an accumulation of wordless wisdom, Judith has an eccentric and unique artistic vision, and thus a unique and eccentric body of significant work."

In Judith Clute's Tantalizing 37th album Geoff Ryman said about her one-person show at Camden Images Gallery that "this is Judith Clute's 37th exhibition … You could call it expressionist except that works express calm, fluidity, balance, and elegance rather than rage of energy. Even when the content seems to be screaming."

=== Awards ===
In 2017, Clute won the "Best Artist Award" delivered by the European Science Fiction Society.

== Selected works ==
=== Cover art and illustrations ===
- 1983: Cover for The Entropy Exhibition by Colin Greenland.
- 1985: Three book covers for books by Joanna Russ published by The Women's Press The Female Man, Extra(ordinary) People and The Adventures of Alex.
- 1989: Further Joanna Russ covers for The Women's Press: The Hidden Side of the Moon and We Who Are About To....
- 1990: Cover and all interior images for the science fiction magazine Interzone 42.
- 1995: Cover for Look at the Evidence; Essays and Reviews by John Clute.
- 2000: Cover for Uncommon Places: Poems of the Fantastic by Judith Kerman and Don Riggs.
- 2003: Cover for Scores: Reviews 1993–2003 by John Clute.
- 2005: Cover for Surroundings: Reviews 1992–1996 by Gary K. Wolfe.
- 2006: Cover and all interior illustrations for Chip Crockett's Christmas Carol by Elizabeth Hand.
- 2008: Etchings for Henry Wessells, in his Temporary Culture publication of Forever Peace. Stop War by Joe Haledeman. (Copies are held in the Morgan Library and Museum, Yale Library and Duke University.)
- 2009: Cover for Canary Fever: Reviews by John Clute.
- 2010: Cover for Bearings: Reviews 1997–2001 by Gary K. Wolfe
- 2011: Cover for Sightings: Reviews 2002–2006, also by Gary K. Wolfe.
- 2011: Cover for Pardon This Intrusion: Fantastika in the World Storm by John Clute.
- 2011: Clute's painting "Bone Scan" was used for the cover of the online magazine, Salon Futura, issue 5.
- 2014: Cover for Stay by John Clute.
- 2017: Album cover for Amanda Palmer and Edward Ka-Spel's I Can Spin a Rainbow.
- 2019: Illustration for a The New York Review of Books article entitled "A Universe of One's Own" by Nicole Rudrick reviewing The Future is Female!: 25 Classic Science Fiction Stories by Women, from Pulp Pioneers to Ursula K. Le Guin. The illustration was Clutes's cover design for Joanna Russ's Female Man.

== Selected bibliography ==
- The Association of Illustrators: 10th Annual, Rotovision, 1985, page 146, ISBN 2-88046-053-0
- The Encyclopedia of Fantasy and Science Art Techniques, John Grant & Ron Tiner, Titan Books, 1996, page 163, ISBN 1-85286-702-7
- Fantasy Art Masters: The Best In Fantasy and SF Art World Wide, Dick Jude, Harper Collins, 2002, page 38-49 inclusive, ISBN 0-00-713747-8
- Paper Tiger Fantasy Art Gallery, edited by Paul Barnett, Paper Tiger, 2002, pages 30–35 inclusive, ISBN 1-85585-957-2
- Interzone #188, editor David Pringle, "Still Turning Motifs Upside Down", Paul Brazier, Interzone Science Fiction and Fantasy, 2003, pages 34–36 inclusive, ISSN 0264-3596
- Polder: A Festschrift for John Clute and Judith Clute, edited by Farah Mendlesohn, Old Earth Books, 2006. ISBN 1-882968-34-4
- London's Arts Labs and the 60's Avant Garde, David Curtis, John Libbey Publishing, 2020, pages 117-118 inclusive, ISBN 978-0-86196-748-3
