= Mari Kotani =

Japanese science fiction critic

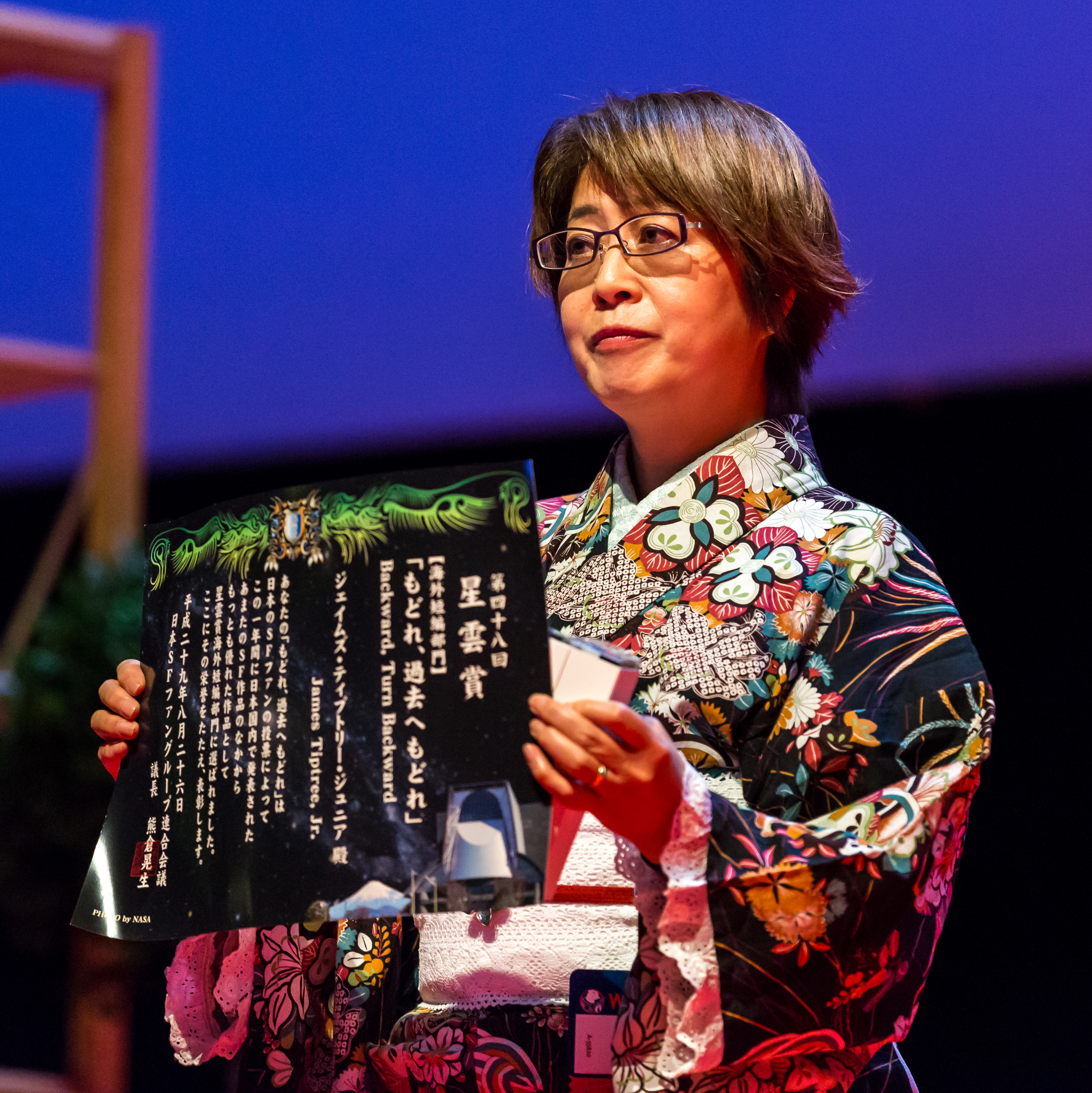
Mari Kotani at the 75th World Science Fiction Convention (2017)

Mari Kotani (小谷 真理, Kotani Mari; born in Toyama Prefecture on July 11, 1958) is a Japanese science fiction critic, best known as the author of Evangelion as the Immaculate Virgin (analysis of the anime serie Neon Genesis Evangelion), Tokyo: Magazine House, 1997 and of Joseijou muishiki: techno-gynesis josei SF-ron josetsu, Tokyo: Keiso shobo, 1994 (Techno-Gynesis: The Political Unconscious of Feminist Science Fiction), which won the 15th Nihon SF Taisho Award.

Kotani is one of the founders of the Japanese Sense of Gender Award (equivalent to the Tiptree Award) in 2001, and of The Japanese Association of Feminist Science Fiction and Fantasy. She is now the chair of the Japan PEN Women Writers Committee and a member of the Science Fiction Writers of Japan.

== "Textual harassment" lawsuit ==
In 1997, Media Works published a reference book, Alternative Culture, which contained an article describing Kotani's book, Evangelion as the Immaculate Virgin, and depicted Mari Kotani's name as a pseudonym for her husband Takayuki Tatsumi, a professor of English at Keio University. When her complaints were ignored, she sued the author of the entry (Hiroo Yamagata), the publisher and Shufu-no-Tomo-sha, the distributor of the book, for what she termed "textual harassment." The lawsuit was broadly supported by Japanese writers. The Japan PEN Club established a Women Writer's Committee, with feminist critic Kazuko Saegusa as chair, and Kotani as sub-chair. During this period, Kotani and Maki Honda's translation of Joanna Russ' How to Suppress Women's Writing received by major feminist critics in Japan including Chizuko Ueno, Fukuko Kobayashi, Yuko Matsumoto, and Kazuko Takemura. In 2001 the defendants were ordered to pay Kotani 3,300,000 yen (roughly $27,500), and to publish an apology on the top page of their respective website.

== Cosplay ==
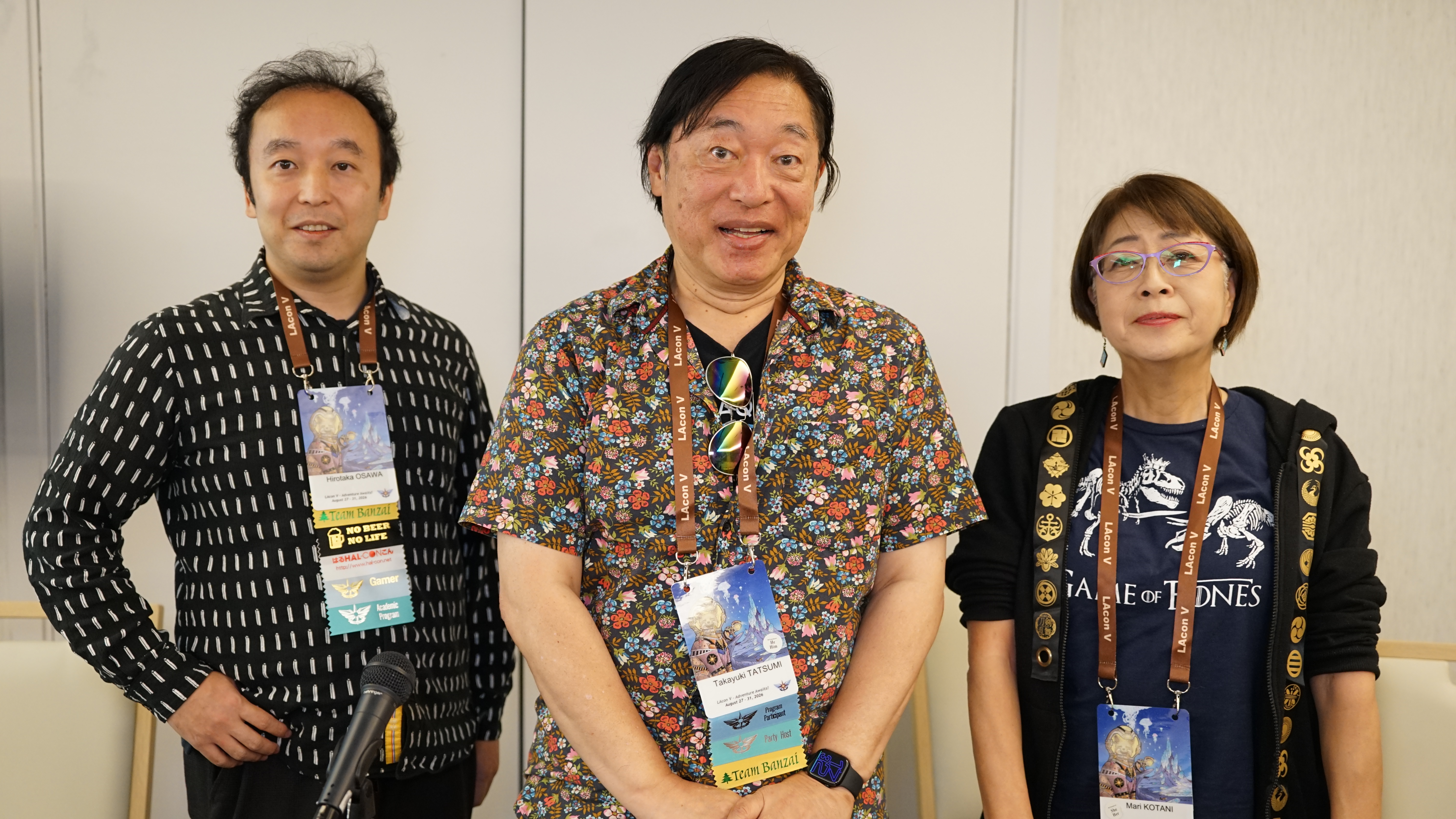
Hirotaka Osawa, Takayuki Tatsumi, Kotani at Seiun Award, Worldcon 2026 in Anaheim

Kotani was not the first cosplayer in Japan but she is the earliest documented instance of cosplay at a fan event in that country. She attended a costume party at the 17th Nihon SF Taikai (also known as "Ashinocon") science fiction convention in 1978 wearing a costume based on the cover art for Edgar Rice Burroughs' novel A Fighting Man of Mars. This costume has sometimes been misreported as a Triton costume (from the manga Triton of the Sea) due to its visual similarity and because Kotani was known at the time as a member of the TRITON fan club. She was one of about the twenty people at the event wearing a costume; the others were either members of the same Triton of the Sea fan club or of Kansai Entertainers (西芸人人, Kansai Geinin), the antecedent of the Gainax anime studio. Despite being a costume party, most attendees wore ordinary clothing.

In 2003, she established the annual Kotani Cup "for celebrating the best cos-players [sic] at Japanese National SF Convention."

== Partial bibliography ==
Works by Kotani include:

- Joseijou muishiki: techno-gynesis josei SF-ron josetsu. Tokyo: Keiso shobo, 1994. (Techno-Gynesis: The Political Unconscious of Feminist Science Fiction) ISBN 4-326-15289-3, ISBN 978-4-326-15289-6 which won the 15th Nihon SF Taisho Award
- Fantasy no Boken (Adventure of Fantasy)
- Otoko-tachi no Shiranai On'na (The Women Men Don't See), translation of Marleen Barr's Lost in Space: Probing Feminist Science Fiction and Beyond
- Translation of Donna Haraway A Cyborg Manifesto (won the 2nd Japanese Translation Award for Philosophy)
- Translation of Joanna Russ How to Suppress Women's Writing (with Maki Hona)
- "Across the Multiverse: How Do Aliens Travel from 'Divisional' Space to 'Network' Space?" Japanese Journal of American Studies (Japanese Association for American Studies) 13 (2002): 157–170.
- Space, Body, and Aliens in Japanese Women's Science Fiction (Science Fiction Studies, 2002)
- Hoshi no kagi, maho no kobako: Kotani Mari no Fantaji & SF annai (Tōkyō: Chūo Kōronsha, 2005) ISBN 4-12-003694-4, ISBN 978-4-12-003694-1
- Tekuno goshikku (Techno-goth) (Tōkyō: Hōmusha: Shūeisha, 2005) ISBN 4-8342-5121-7, ISBN 978-4-8342-5121-0
- Disturbing, Traversing, Borderless, Shaking Sexuality: The Place where Revolutionary Girl Utena was Born, 2000.
