= Suzette Haden Elgin bibliography =

Literary work of Suzette Haden Elgin

== Fiction ==
=== Coyote Jones series ===
- The Communipaths (1970)
- Furthest (1971)
- At the Seventh Level (1972) (cover and interior illustrations by George Barr)
- Star-Anchored, Star-Angered (1979); ISBN 0-385-13564-5
- Yonder Comes the Other End of Time (1986); ISBN 0-88677-110-2 (also in The Ozark series)

=== The Ozark Trilogy (1981) ===
- Twelve Fair Kingdoms; ISBN 0-385-15876-9
- The Grand Jubilee; ISBN 0-385-15877-7
- And Then There'll Be Fireworks; ISBN 0-385-15878-5
- Yonder Comes the Other End of Time (1986); ISBN 0-88677-110-2 (also in the Coyote Jones series)

=== Native Tongue series ===
- Native Tongue (1984); ISBN 0-87997-945-3
- The Judas Rose (1987); ISBN 0-88677-186-2
- Earthsong (1993); ISBN 0-88677-592-2

=== Other ===
- Peacetalk 101 (2003); ISBN 1-59021-030-1

=== Short stories ===
- "For the Sake of Grace" – Fantasy & Science Fiction, 1969 (inspired the novel The Two of Them by Joanna Russ)
- "Old Rocking Chair's Got Me" – Fantasy & Science Fiction, 1974
- "Modulation in All Things" – Reflections of the Future anthology, 1975
- "Lest Levitation Come Upon Us" – Perpetual Light anthology, 1982 (reprinted in The Year's Best Fantasy Stories: 9 anthology, 1983)
- "Magic Granny Says Don't Meddle" – Fantasy & Science Fiction, 1984
- "School Days" – Light Years and Dark anthology, 1984
- "Chico Lafleur Talks Funny" – A Treasury of American Horror Stories, 1985
- "Lo, How an Oak E'er Blooming" – Fantasy & Science Fiction, 1986
- "Hush My Mouth" – Alternative Histories: 11 Stories of the World as It Might Have Been, edited by Charles G. Waugh and Martin H. Greenberg, 1986
- "Tornado" – Fantasy & Science Fiction, 1989
- "What the EPA Don't Know Won't Hurt Them" – Fantasy & Science Fiction, 1990
- "Only A Housewife" – Fantasy & Science Fiction, 1995
- "Soulfedge Rock" – Space Opera anthology, 1996
- "Weather Bulletin" – 1999
- "Honor Is Golden" – Analog, 2003
- "We have always spoken Panglish"- SciFi.com, 2004 (Panglish appears in Native Tongue)
- "What We Can See Now, Looking in the Glass" – Glorifying Terrorism, 2007

=== Poetry ===
- The Less Said: A Book of Poems (1965)
- "McLuhan Transposed" – Burning with a Vision anthology, 1968
- "Lexical Gap" – Isaac Asimov's Science Fiction Magazine, 1985
- "Presuppositional Ghostbusting" – Isaac Asimov's Science Fiction Magazine, 1985
- "Rocky Road to Hoe" – Star*Line, 1987
- "Binary Addendum" – Star*Line, 1989

=== Songs (partial list) ===
- "Dead Skunk Song"
- "Song at the Ready"
- "When I Was a Young Girl" (lyrics only, to the tune of "The Ash Grove")
- "Where the Emerald Kudzu Twines"
- "The World They Call Terra"
- "Down in Holes" (lyrics only, to the tune of "Frère Jacques")
- "The Firelizard Song"
- "The Seas of Space"

== Nonfiction ==
=== The Gentle Art of Verbal Self-Defense ===
- The Gentle Art of Verbal Self-Defense (1980); ISBN 0-13-351080-8
- More on the Gentle Art of Verbal Self-Defense (1983); ISBN 0-13-601120-9
- The Gentle Art of Verbal Self-Defense Workbook (1987)
- The Last Word on the Gentle Art of Verbal Self-Defense (1987); ISBN 0-13-524067-0
- Language in Emergency Medicine (1987); ISBN 0-7388-1227-7
- The Gentle Art of Verbal Self Defense (Paperback; 1988; Barnes & Noble); ISBN 0-88029-257-1
- Growing Civilized Kids in a Savage World (1989)
- The Gentle Art of Verbal Self-Defense for Business Success (1989); ISBN 0-13-921032-6
- Success with the Art of Verbal Self-Defense (1989); ISBN 0-13-688581-0
- Staying Well with the Gentle Art of Verbal Self-Defense (1990); ISBN 0-13-845116-8
- GenderSpeak (1993); ISBN 0-471-58016-3
- The Gentle Art of Written Self-Defense (1993); ISBN 1-56731-113-X
- The Gentle Art of Written Self-Defense Letter Book (1993); ISBN 0-13-350422-0
- Language in Law Enforcement (1993); ISBN 1-878709-04-6
- Linguistics & Science Fiction Sampler (1994)
- Mastering the Gentle Art of Verbal Self-Defense (1995-05; Unabridged; audio-cassette); ISBN 0-7871-0282-2
- BusinessSpeak (1995); ISBN 0-07-020000-9
- "You Can't Say That To Me!" (1995); ISBN 0-471-00399-9
- The Gentle Art of Communicating with Kids (1996); ISBN 0-471-03996-9
- How to Disagree Without Being Disagreeable (1997-03; Wiley); ISBN 0-471-15705-8
- How to Turn the Other Cheek and Still Survive in Today's World (1997); ISBN 0-7852-7249-6
- The Gentle Art of Verbal Self-Defense at Work (2000-01-19; Second Edition; Prentice Hall); ISBN 0-7352-0089-0
- The Gentle Art of Verbal Self-Defense: Revised and Updated (2009); ISBN 978-1-4351-1342-8

=== Other ===
- A Guide to Transformational Grammar (with John Grinder) (1973); ISBN 0-03-080126-5
- What is Linguistics? (1973); ISBN 0-13-952390-1
- Bully for Us (with John Grinder) (1974)
- Pouring Down Words (1975); ISBN 0-13-686857-6
- A Primer of Transformational Grammar for Rank Beginners (1975); ISBN 0-8141-3693-1
- Never Mind the Trees (1980)
- The Great Grammar Myth (1982)
- A First Dictionary and Grammar of Láadan (1985, 2nd ed. 1988); ISBN 0-9618641-0-9
- Try to Feel It My Way (1997); ISBN 0-471-00670-X
- The Grandmother Principles (1998); ISBN 0-7892-0431-2
- The Language Imperative (2000); ISBN 0-7382-0254-1
