= The Female Man =

1975 novel by Joanna Russ

- Cover of first edition (paperback)
- Author: Joanna Russ
- Cover artist: Morgan Kane
- Language: English
- Genre: Science fiction
- Publisher: Bantam Books
- Publication date: February 1975
- Publication place: United States
- Media type: Print (paperback)
- Pages: 214
- ISBN: 0553111752
- OCLC: 17828558

The Female Man is a feminist science fiction novel by American writer Joanna Russ. It was originally written in 1970 and first published in 1975 by Bantam Books. Russ was an ardent feminist and challenged sexist views during the 1970s with her novels, short stories, and nonfiction works. These works include We Who Are About To..., "When It Changed", and What Are We Fighting For?: Sex, Race, Class, and the Future of Feminism.

The novel follows the lives of four women living in parallel universes which differ in time and place. The women visit each other's worlds and are startled by the different views on gender roles and social conventions surrounding women and womanhood. Their encounters influence them to reevaluate their lives and redefine what it means to be a woman.

The title of the novel comes from the character Joanna, who transforms into a "female man" in order to be respected and seen beyond her sex. A "female man" is a woman with a man's mind, her body and soul still female. Joanna's metaphorical transformation refers to her decision to seek equality by rejecting women's dependence on men and mirrors the journeys made by the other three protagonists.

== Setting ==
The Female Man includes several fictional worlds.

- Joanna's World: Joanna exists in a world that is similar to Earth in the 1970s.
- Jeannine's World: Jeannine lives in New York City in 1969, in a world where the Great Depression never ended and World War II never happened. As a result, her world is in a never ending depression without any significant feminist movements.
- Whileaway: Janet's world is an all-female utopian Earth ten centuries in the future called Whileaway, where all the men died from a sex-specific plague 900 years from the beginning of the novel. However in the final chapter, it is suggested by Jael that the plague was a lie and that the men were killed. The language of Whileaway is "Pan-russian" and is nothing like the Russian of the 20th century. To procreate, women in lesbian relationships use technology to genetically merge ova. Although Whileaway is technologically advanced, their societies are mostly agrarian. Whileaway is less concerned with equality than it is with safety. There is no sexual assault or murder, and children are free to play naked and without fear. There are duels which can end in the death of one of the dueling parties but this is commonplace in Whileaway and seen as an effective way to deal with a dispute.
- Womanland: Jael's world is a dystopia where men (Manlanders) and women (Womanlanders) are in a literal "battle of the sexes". Although their war has been ongoing for forty years, both societies trade with each other, especially children. Womanlanders keep the female children and exchange male children for resources. In order for men to cope with their sexual desires, a select number of young boys deemed not masculine enough undergo sex change surgery. In lieu of men, Womanlanders like Jael have automatons or pursue lesbian relationships.

== Plot summary ==
The novel begins when Janet Evason suddenly arrives and disappears in Jeannine's world. Janet is from Whileaway, a futuristic world where a plague killed all of the men over 800 years ago, and Jeannine lives in a world that never experienced the end of the Great Depression. Janet takes Jeannine to Joanna's world, where both women meet in a cocktail lounge and watch Janet's televised interview. She explains to the male interviewer the culture and customs of Whileawayans which differ greatly from Joanna's world. When Janet begins to explain to the interviewer how women in Whileaway "copulate" she is abruptly cut off by a commercial break.

Acting as a guide, Joanna takes Janet to a party in her world to show her how women and men interact with each other. Janet quickly finds herself to be the object of a man's attention as he continually harasses her. After she has had enough, Janet knocks the man down and mocks him. Her behavior shocks everyone at the party, since in Joanna's world, it is believed that women are inferior to men. Janet then expresses her desire to experience living with a typical family to Joanna, who takes Janet to the Wildings’ household in Anytown, U.S.A. Janet meets their teenage daughter Laura Rose who instantly admires Janet's confidence and independence as a woman. Laura realizes that she is attracted to Janet and begins to pursue a sexual relationship with her. This is transgressive for both of them, as Whileaway's taboo against cross-generational relationships (having a relationship with someone old enough to be your parent or young enough to be your child) is as strong as the taboo against same-sex relationships on Laura's world. After the two have sex for the first time, Janet recounts to Laura how she met and fell in love with her wife, Vittoria, back in Whileaway.

Jeannine and Joanna accompany Janet back to Whileaway where they meet Vittoria and stay at their home. A small Whileawayan child follows Joanna and tells her a story about a bear trapped between two worlds as a metaphor for her life. Jeannine returns to her world with Joanna, and they both go to vacation at her brother's house. Jeannine's mother pesters her about her love life and asks whether she is going to get married soon. Jeannine goes on a few dates with some men but still finds herself dissatisfied. Jeannine begins to doubt her sense of reality, but soon decides that she wants to assimilate into her role as a woman. She calls Cal to pick her up and agrees to marry him.

Joanna, Jeannine, and Janet arrive in Jael's world which has had a 40 year old war between men and women. Jael explains that she works for the Bureau of Comparative Ethnology, an organization that concentrates on people's various counterparts in different parallel worlds. She reveals that she is the one who brought all of them together because they are four versions of the same woman. Jael takes all of them with her into enemy territory where she appears to be negotiating a deal with one of the male leaders. At first, the male leader appears to be promoting equality, but Jael quickly realizes that he still believes in the inferiority of women. He relentlessly harasses Jael and tries to convince her that it is necessary for both societies to reconcile. Jael reveals herself as a ruthless assassin, kills the man, and shuttles all of the women back to her house. At her house, the women witness Jael and Davy, her biological automaton, having sex. Jael finally tells the other women why she has assembled all of them. She wants to create secret military bases in the women's worlds without the men's knowledge. Her hope is that eventually, the women in each world will be empowered and overthrow their respective patriarchal societies.

Jeannine and Joanna agree to help Jael assimilate the women soldiers into their worlds, but Janet refuses, given the overall pacifism of Whileaway. Jeannine and Joanna appear to have become stronger individuals and are excited to rise up against their gender roles. Janet is not moved by Jael's intentions so Jael suggests to Janet that the reason for the absence of men on Whileaway is not because of a plague but because the women won the war and killed all of the men in its timeline's past. Janet refuses to believe Jael, and the other women are annoyed at Janet's resistance. The novel ends with the women separating and returning to their worlds, each with a new perspective on her life, her world, and her identity as a woman.

== Characters ==
=== Major characters ===
Jeannine Nancy Dadier is a twenty-nine year old librarian who lives in a world that never escaped the Great Depression. She has a blue-eyed cat named Mr. Frosty to whom she constantly speaks and lavishes with attention. Jeannine faces constant pressure from her family and society to get married. She doubts her boyfriend Cal's ability to make her happy, but eventually becomes engaged to him. Of all the women, she is the least radicalized and seen as the weakest of all the women. Still, Jael says she is arguably the most intelligent of the four women. At the end of the novel, Jeannine appears to have broken from the expectations of marriage and welcomes the social revolution against men.

Joanna lives in 1969, in a world remarkably similar to Earth. The feminist movement has just begun, and Joanna is determined to refute her world's belief that women are inferior to men. Joanna is witty and smart, but she struggles to assert her abilities and intelligence among her male peers. In order to cope, she repeatedly refers to herself as the “female man” to indicate her adoption of the male gender role and separate herself from being identified as just another woman. She identifies herself as the author of the novel throughout the work. She is named after and based on Russ.

Janet Evason Belin comes from a futuristic world called Whileaway where all the men died of a sex-specific plague over 900 years ago. She is a Safety and Peace officer, similar to a police officer, and has just become an emissary to other worlds. She explains that this is because she is expendable, and relatively stupid compared to other Whileawayans. She is married to Vittoria and has two children. Janet becomes romantically involved with Laura Wilding, the teenage daughter of the family she was staying with in Joanna's world. She is referred to by Jael as "The Strong One" and "Miss Sweden". She is older than the other women, and is the most evolutionary advanced as she has no allergies, appendix, or double joints. In addition to being confident and assertive, Janet is perhaps the most independent from men because she has never experienced patriarchal domination.

Alice Jael Reasoner, often referred to as Jael (codename Sweet Alice), is an assassin living in a world where men and women have been at war for forty years. Each sex has made their own societies, Womanland and Manland, that excludes the other. Jael has silver claws that are revealed when she pulls back the skin and metal teeth, which she uses as her weapons. She is a radical and performs her job well. Jael is the instigator behind the four women's meeting and proposes a revolution against all men.

=== Minor characters ===
Laura Rose, nickname Laur, is the daughter in the family that Janet stays with when she is visiting Joanna's world. She proclaims herself to be a “victim of penis envy,” frustrated that she must stifle her potential in order to become a housewife. She is a shy tomboy with short hair and freckles who struggles in her sexual orientation and womanhood. She daydreams she is Genghis Khan to cope. Janet's confidence and independence from men fascinates Laura, and she begins to pursue a sexual relationship with Janet.

Vittoria is Janet's wife. She and Janet have two daughters. She is mentioned often by Janet and makes a brief appearance when all four women visit Whileaway.

Cal is Jeannine's boyfriend and soon-to-be fiancé. He cries often and wears her necklaces. She does not believe that Cal is masculine enough to provide for her.

Bud Dadier is Jeannine's older brother who teaches high school math. He is married and has two children. He and his mother constantly pressure Jeannine into marriage.

Mrs. Dadier is Jeannine's mother who lives with Jeannine's brother and his family. When Jeannine spends a vacation at her brother's house, Mrs. Dadier plagues Jeannine with lectures regarding the importance of marriage.

Frank, also referred to as X, is a married man who takes Jeannine on a few dates while she stays at her brother's house. He is estranged from his wife, and though Jeannine feels no connection to him, she goes out with him to appease her family.

Davy is Jael's male automaton. His "original germ-plasm" is described as chimpanzee, but he resembles a beautiful young man. Devoid of will, and possibly of all higher brain functions, he is connected to Jael's computerised home and is controlled by her facial cues and verbal commands.

Dunyasha Bernadettson is a Whileawayan philosopher brought up often by Janet throughout the novel.

== Structure and format ==
The novel is divided into nine parts, with each further divided into chapters. The sections of the novel are usually dedicated to one character's perspective, but often the point of view changes between the four characters and skips from location and time. It is often unclear who is speaking and as a result, creates confusion in the narration. The constant switching in point of view represents the women's, and Russ's, resistance to the male dominated genre. Joanna, Janet, and Jael's perspectives are told in first person narrative, but they often refer to themselves in the third person while the narration is still through their point of view. Laura Wilding is the only minor character to have the narrative told through her perspective. Jeannine's perspective is told solely through a third person narrative until she begins to question her role in a patriarchy and is absorbed in the first person point of view in the final chapter:

We got up and paid our quintuple bill; then we went out onto the street. I said goodbye and went off with Laur, I, Janet; I also watched them go, I, Joanna; forever I went off to show Jael the city, I Jeaninne, I Jael, I myself. (p. 212)

Joanna describes writing the novel, and acknowledges the audience in the final chapter. She describes her style of narration as feminine:

I have no structure…my thoughts seep out shapelessly like menstrual fluid, it is all very female and deep and full of essences, it is very primitive and full of ‘and’s,’ it is called ‘run-on sentences'. (p. 137).

Joanna also inserts imaginary conversations in the form of a script that demonstrate her frustration with men. There are also poems, and Janet often gives background history on Whileaway, including citing a Whileaway philosopher, to provide insight on her culture. Jael is introduced in part two, signaled by an italicized text; however, her story begins in part eight with a repetition of the italicized chapter. It is not until part eight that the novel focuses on Jael and formally introduces her.

== Literary significance and reception ==
As the feminist movement began to gain attention, many regarded the novel as one of the most influential works in feminist literature and its wide acceptance heralded the start of feminist science fiction. Upon its release, the novel was received favorably.

Douglas Barbour in the Toronto Star wrote:

A work of frightening power, but it is also a work of great fictional subtlety ... it should appeal to all intelligent people who look for exciting ideation, crackling dialogue, provocative fictional games-playing in their reading.

Elizabeth Lynn, of the San Francisco Review of books, described it as "A stunning book, a work to be read with great respect. It’s also screamingly funny."

Though it is highly regarded as an important feminist text, the novel is not without its share of controversy. It is also considered to be dated by some, and divides critics and audiences alike. Most of the criticism received by Russ was on the radical feminism the novel is perceived to propagate. The character Jael implies that the slaughter of men was inevitable and necessary for the feminist utopia. For Jael, violence is the only means through which women can free themselves.

== Allusions and references ==
=== Allusions to other works ===
- "When It Changed" by Joanna Russ: The character Janet, and a different version of Whileaway (a planet colonized from Earth, rather than a future version of Earth itself), exist in the short story "When It Changed".
- Gulliver's Travels by Jonathan Swift: Queen Anne is referred to as a "female man" in Chapter 4 of the Houyhnhnms section.
- Beowulf from oral tradition: Joanna alludes to Grendel's mother to demonstrate that a woman can be both a nurturing mother and an aggressive, strong woman.
- The Subjection of Women by John Stuart Mill: Joanna references Mill when she lists the many examples of how men have historically oppressed women.
- The Bible: Jael is named after Yael, who kills Sisera by driving a tent peg through his skull while he sleeps. At one point Russ describes Jael in words paraphrased from the Book of Judges: "At her feet he bowed, he fell, he lay down: at her feet he bowed, he fell: where he bowed, there he fell down dead" (Jdg. 5:27).

=== Allusions to history ===
Russ's novel refers to the problematic issues in the 1970s when the feminist movement became highly influential. Because The Female Man was written during the 1970s, the character Joanna's world is most similar to the real world Russ lived in. The novel also addresses the environmental movement as shown through Janet's utopian society. Though Janet's world is extremely technologically advanced, the women choose to live in agrarian societies. Whileaway forms an idealistic image of an organic environment where nature is preserved despite the radical development of technology.

The novel also mentions the Great Depression, which started in 1929 when the world's economy was plunged into a long and deep recession. In Jeannine's world, however, the Great Depression never ended. The text suggests that the continuation of the Great Depression forced women to seek husbands for financial support and prohibited women from finding jobs of their own, perpetuating gender roles.

== Awards and nominations ==
After having been nominated for the 1975 Nebula Award for Best Novel, The Female Man won one of three Retrospective Tiptree Awards in 1996. It also won a 2002 Gaylactic Spectrum Hall of Fame Award.
