= The Two of Them =

The Two of Them may refer to:

- The Two of Them (film), 1977 Hungarian film
- The Two of Them (novel), by Joanna Russ
