= The Zanzibar Cat =

Book by Joanna Russ

- Dust-jacket illustration by James C. Christensen for The Zanzibar Cat
- Author: Joanna Russ
- Illustrator: Dennis Neal Smith
- Cover artist: James C. Christensen
- Language: English
- Genre: Science fiction, fantasy, horror
- Publisher: Arkham House
- Publication date: October 1983
- Publication place: United States
- Media type: Print (hardback & paperback)
- Pages: xii, 244 pp
- ISBN: 0-87054-097-1
- OCLC: 9441030
- Dewey Decimal: 813/.54 19
- LC Class: PS3568.U763 Z23 1983

The Zanzibar Cat is a science fiction collection of short stories by Joanna Russ, first published in 1983 by Arkham House. It was the author's first collection of short fiction and was published in an edition of 3,526 copies. The story "When It Changed" won a Nebula Award in 1972. "Old Thoughts, Old Balances" won a 1977 O. Henry Prize under the title "The Autobiography of My Mother".

It was reprinted (with revised contents) by Baen in 1984.

== Contents ==
=== Arkham House ===
- "Foreword" by Marge Piercy
- "When It Changed"
- "The Extraordinary Voyages of Amélie Bertrand"
- "The Soul of a Servant"
- "Gleepsite"
- "Nobody's Home"
- "My Dear Emily"
- "The New Men"
- "My Boat"
- "Useful Phrases for the Tourist"
- "Corruption"
- "There is Another Shore, You Know, Upon the Other Side"
- "A Game of Vlet"
- "How Dorothy Kept Away the Spring"
- "Poor Man, Beggar Man"
- "Old Thoughts, Old Presences"
- "The Zanzibar Cat"

=== Baen ===
- "When It Changed"
- "The Extraordinary Voyages of Amélie Bertrand"
- "The Soul of a Servant"
- "The Man Who Could Not See Devils"
- "Gleepsite"
- "Nobody's Home"
- "My Dear Emily"
- "There is Another Shore, You Know, Upon the Other Side"
- "My Boat"
- "Useful Phrases for the Tourist"
- "Dragons and Dimwits"
- "Corruption"
- "The Precious Object"
- "The New Men"
- "A Game of Vlet"
- "The Zanzibar Cat"

== Sources ==
- Chalker, Jack L.; Mark Owings (1998). The Science-Fantasy Publishers: A Bibliographic History, 1923-1998. Westminster, MD and Baltimore: Mirage Press, Ltd. p. 55.
- Jaffery, Sheldon (1989). The Arkham House Companion. Mercer Island, WA: Starmont House, Inc. pp. 134–135. ISBN 1-55742-005-X.
- Joshi, S.T. (1999). Sixty Years of Arkham House: A History and Bibliography. Sauk City, WI: Arkham House. p. 151. ISBN 0-87054-176-5.
- Nielsen, Leon (2004). Arkham House Books: A Collector's Guide. Jefferson, NC and London: McFarland & Company, Inc. p. 129. ISBN 0-7864-1785-4.
