= Souls (story) =

- Short story by Joanna Russ
- Country: USA
- Language: English
- Genre: science fiction

Publication
- Published in: the Magazine of Fantasy & Science Fiction
- Publication date: January 1982

"Souls" is a 1982 science fiction novella by Joanna Russ. It was first published in the Magazine of Fantasy & Science Fiction in January 1982, and subsequently republished in Terry Carr's The Best Science Fiction of the Year 12, in Russ's 1984 collection Extra(ordinary) People, as well as in the first volume of the Isaac Asimov/Martin H. Greenberg-edited anthology The New Hugo Winners, and in 1989 as half of a Tor Double Novel (with "Houston, Houston, Do You Read?" by James Tiptree, Jr.).

== Plot ==
In 12th-century Germany, Radulphus tells the story of Radegunde, abbess of the abbey where he spent his childhood, and of what she did "when the Norsemen came" — and of how he discovered her true nature.

== Reception ==
"Souls" won the 1983 Hugo Award for Best Novella and the Locus Award for Best Novella, and was a finalist for the Nebula Award for Best Novella.

Stephen Burt has described the story as "perfectly wrought".
