= And Chaos Died =

1970 novel by Joanna Russ

- Cover of 1970 Ace Books first edition
- Author: Joanna Russ
- Cover artist: Leo and Diane Dillon
- Language: English
- Genre: Science fiction
- Publisher: Ace Books
- Publication date: 1970
- Publication place: United States
- Media type: Print (hardback & paperback)
- Pages: 189
- ISBN: 0-425-04135-2 (1979 edition)
- OCLC: 6775846

And Chaos Died (1970) is a science fiction novel by American writer Joanna Russ. Its setting is a dystopian projection of modern society, in which Earth's population has continued to grow, with the effects somewhat mitigated by advanced technology. The novel was nominated for the 1970 Nebula Award.

== Plot ==
On the grossly-overpopulated planet, remnants of "nature" exist only in the isolated areas not covered by housing, industry and industrial farming. Creativity and individuality are suppressed and channeled into rigid social formats. A powerful bureaucracy/police state oversees the acts of all citizens. Its purpose is to maintain control for the planetary elite, and to that end it is prepared to resort to any method, however ruthless.

In contrast to all this, the author introduces another planet on which human development has followed a diametrically opposite path: the natural world is respected; population is limited; and each individual is encouraged to develop uniquely. On this other world, human beings are known to be basically "spiritual", and immortal in nature. Telepathy and telekinesis are developed as much and as rapidly as possible.

As the narrative progresses, a confrontation develops between these different systems.

== Reception ==
And Chaos Died was nominated for the 1970 Nebula Award.

James Blish praised the novel, saying "The totality is impressive not only for its inventiveness and the brilliance of its technique, but because the fantastic central assumption has been used to tell you real things about the real human psyche."

In 2011, Lee Mandelo writing in Reactor, called And Chaos Died, "a strange, psychedelic book that, in many ways, doesn’t age well" and "my least favorite of Russ’s works; I wouldn’t likely read it again, beautiful as it is."

== Sources ==
- Samuel R. Delany, The Order of "Chaos" (review), in Science Fiction Studies 6, 3 (November 1979).
