= To Write Like a Woman =

To Write Like a Woman: Essays in Feminism and Science Fiction
- Author: Joanna Russ
- Language: English
- Genre: Non-fiction essays
- Publisher: Indiana University Press
- Publication date: 1995
- Media type: Print
- ISBN: 0-253-20983-8

To Write Like a Woman: Essays in Feminism and Science Fiction is a collection of essays by Joanna Russ, published in 1995. Many of the essays previously appeared as letters, in anthologies, or in journals such as Science Fiction Studies, Extrapolation, and Chrysalis. Topics range from the work of specific authors to major trends in feminism and science fiction. Through all of these different topics, Russ underlines the importance of celebrating the work of female authors and turning a critical eye on the commentaries and work produced by men.

The collection is split up into two sections. Part One focuses on the critique of masculinist writing and male authorship, while Part Two focuses on the work of female authors and their relationship to writing.

== Contents ==
=== Part One ===
- "Towards an Aesthetic of Science Fiction"
  Originally published in Science Fiction Studies, July 1975
- "Speculations: The Subjunctivity of Science Fiction"
  Originally published in Extrapolation, Vol. 15 (1973)
- "SF and Technology as Mystification"
  Originally published in Science Fiction Studies, November 1978
- "Amor Vincit Foeminam: The Battle of the Sexes in Science Fiction"
  Originally published in Science Fiction Studies, March 1980
- "On the Fascination of Horror Stories, Including Lovecraft's"
  Originally published in Science Fiction Studies, March 1980
- "A Boy and His Dog: The Final Solution"
  Originally published in Frontiers: A Journal of Women’s Studies, Fall 1975

=== Part Two ===
- "What Can a Heroine Do? or Why Women Can't Write"
  Originally published as part of Susan Koppelman's Images of Women in Fiction: Feminist Perspectives
- "Somebody’s Trying to Kill Me and I Think It's My Husband: The Modern Gothic"
  Originally published in The Journal of Popular Culture, 1973.
- "On Mary Wollstonecraft Shelley"
  Originally published as the introduction to Mary Wollstonecraft Shelley's posthumous collection, Tales and Stories, 1975.
- "Recent Feminist Utopias"
  Originally published in Marleen S. Barr's Future Females: A Critical Anthology.
- "To Write 'Like a Woman': Transformations of Identity in the Work of Willa Cather"
  Originally published in The Journal of Homosexuality, 1986.
- "On 'The Yellow Wallpaper'"
  Originally written as a letter to the editors of the National Women's Studies Association (NWSA) Journal but published for the first time here in To Write Like a Woman.
- "Is 'Smashing' Erotic?"
  Originally published as a letter to the editors of Chrysalis in 1979.
- ”Letter to Susan Koppelman”

== Reception ==
This collection of essays has been praised for its accessibility, even to readers unfamiliar with complex feminist or science fiction critique theory. Criticism has mostly been centered on the contradictions in subject matter for the essays, since the source material ranges from Mary Wollstonecraft Shelley to Star Trek. In addition, critics have claimed that Russ' cautions against psychoanalytic readings of an author's work are naïve and overly simplistic.
