= How to Suppress Women's Writing =

1983 book by Joanna Russ

- Cover of the first edition
- Author: Joanna Russ
- Language: English
- Publisher: University of Texas Press
- Publication date: 1983
- Publication place: United States
- Media type: Print
- ISBN: 0-292-72445-4

How to Suppress Women's Writing is a book by Joanna Russ, published in 1983. Written in the style of a sarcastic and irreverent guidebook, it explains how women are prevented from producing written works, not given credit when such works are produced, or dismissed or belittled for those contributions which they are acknowledged to have made. Although primarily focusing on texts written in English, the author also includes examples from non-English works and other media, like paintings. Citing authors and critics like Suzy McKee Charnas, Margaret Cavendish, and Vonda McIntyre, Russ aims to describe the systematic social forces that impede widespread recognition of the work of female authors.

Although Russ was an active feminist and one of the central contributors to the feminist science fiction scene during the late 1960s and 70s, How to Suppress Women's Writing marked a transition towards her focus on literary criticism. In the same decade, she went on to write an essay entitled "Recent Feminist Utopias," which was later published in 1995 as part of her book, To Write Like a Woman: Essays in Feminism and Science Fiction.

== Russ' suppression methods ==
The book outlines eleven common methods that are used to ignore, condemn or belittle the work of female authors:

1. Prohibitions
Prevent women from access to the basic tools for writing.
2. Bad Faith
Unconsciously create social systems that ignore or devalue women's writing.
3. Denial of Agency
Deny that a woman wrote it.
4. Pollution of Agency
Show that their art is immodest, not actually art, or shouldn't have been written about.
5. The Double Standard of Content
Claim that one set of experiences is considered more valuable than another.
6. False Categorizing
Incorrectly categorize women artists as the wives, mothers, daughters, sisters, or lovers of male artists.
7. Isolation
Create a myth of isolated achievement that claims that only one work or short series of poems is considered great.
8. Anomalousness
Assert that the woman in question is eccentric or atypical.
9. Lack of Models
Reinforce a male author dominance in literary canons in order to cut off women writers' inspiration and role models.
10. Responses
Force women to deny their female identity in order to be taken seriously.
11. Aesthetics
Popularize aesthetic works that contain demeaning roles and characterizations of women.

== Reception ==
Feminist and civil rights scholars generally received the book positively. It is highly regarded for its cutting humor and wit, as well as its disarming and novel presentation of sexism in the arenas of art and writing.
