= On Strike Against God =

1980 novel by Joanna Russ

- Author: Joanna Russ
- Language: English
- Genre: Lesbian literature
- Publisher: Out & Out Books
- Publication date: 1980 (book)
- Publication place: United States
- Media type: Print (paperback)
- Pages: 107
- ISBN: 0-918314-13-5
- OCLC: 6143852

On Strike Against God is a realist novel written by feminist science fiction writer Joanna Russ. Originally drafted in the early 1970s, it was not published until 1980 (by Out & Out Books), the last of Russ's novels to reach print.

The novel follows Esther, a middle-aged English teacher, as she becomes a feminist and enters into a relationship with another woman, Jean, after realizing she is a lesbian. It contains a number of allusions to other texts and academic works, and Esther often speaks directly to the readers.

== Publication history ==
- 1980, United States, published by ‘Out & Out Books’, ISBN 0-918314-13-5, trade paperback
- October 1985, United States, published by Ten Speed Press, ISBN 0-89594-186-4, trade paperback
- March 1987, United States, published by The Women’s Press, ISBN 0-7043-4074-7, trade paperback
- July 2024, United States, published by Feminist Press, ISBN 9781558613140, trade paperback. Edited by Alec Pollak, with essays by Jeanne Thornton and Mary Anne Mohanraj, interview with Samuel R. Delany, and correspondence with Marilyn Hacker.
