= The Bishop Strachan School =

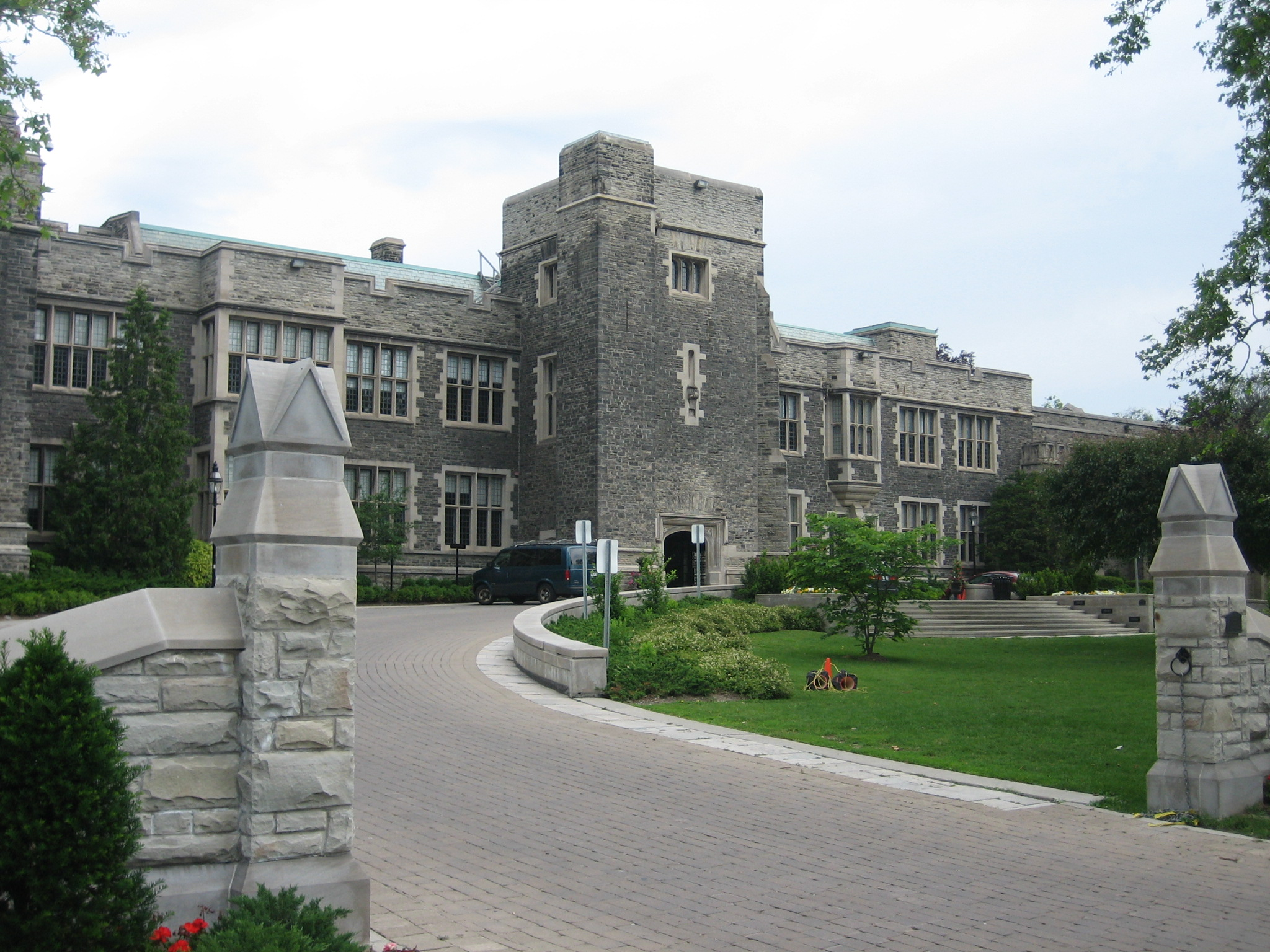

Location
- 298 Lonsdale Road; Toronto, Ontario, M4V 1X2; Canada; 43.6902°N 79.4091°W

Information
- School type: Independent day and boarding
- Motto: In Cruce Vinco (In the cross I conquer)
- Religious affiliation: Anglican
- Founded: 1867; 159 years ago
- Head of school: Meagan Enticknap
- Grades: JK–12
- Gender: Affirming Girls School
- Enrollment: 900
- Language: English
- Colours: Burgundy, White, Black and Grey
- Mascot: Bobcat
- Website: www.bss.on.ca
- Last updated: Feb 1, 2010

The Bishop Strachan School (BSS) is an Anglican day and boarding school for girls in Toronto, Ontario, Canada. The school has approximately 950 students, including 70 boarding students, ranging from Junior Kindergarten to Grade 12 (approximately ages 4–18). The School is named after John Strachan, the first Anglican bishop of Toronto, and was founded by John Langtry in 1867. The founders' intention was to educate girls to be leaders.

The campus is situated within the Forest Hill neighbourhood of Toronto. The main building was designed by Henry Sproatt.

BSS Boarding welcomes Grade 8 to 12 students from Canada and around the world. The Senior School offers a wide range of courses in both traditional subjects and courses such as Media Arts and Design Technology. It offers Advanced Placement courses in some subjects.

Meagan Enticknap is the current head of school.

== History ==
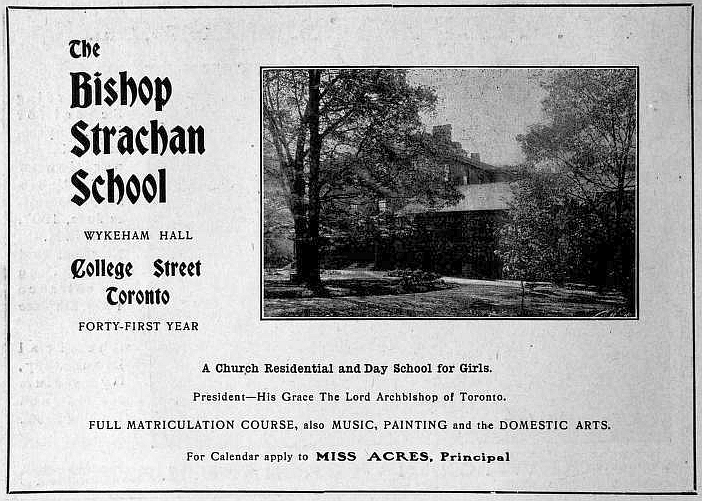
Advertisement in The Busy Man's Magazine, 1907

The Bishop Strachan School has had a variety of temporary homes since the founding:

First opened in September 1867 at Pinehurst, formerly Mrs Forster's Girls School (1853-1866) on west side of McCaul Street between Dundas Street and Grange Road near the Art Gallery of Toronto (currently the Art Gallery of Ontario). The site is now OCAD Sharp Centre.

Relocated in 1868 to John Strachan's Bishop's Palace on north side of Front Street between Simcoe and York Streets after his death in 1867. Built in 1818 it was purchased by Sir John Carling and demolished in 1890. Today it is occupied by commercial building at 150 Front Street West.

Relocated to Wykeham Hall near Bay and College Streets in 1870, this was the former home of Sir James Buchanan Macaulay or Wykeham Lodge. After the schools departure it became Central Military Convalescence Hospital and finally College Street Armouries before being demolished in 1928 to make way for Eaton's College Street store. A marker on the College Park building at the southwest corner of Yonge and College Streets provides history of the site.

In September 1915, The Bishop Strachan School opened as a large gothic-style structure, made of Credit Valley limestone, at its present-day Forest Hill location at 298 Lonsdale Road. In 2017, the school completed a $35 million renovation. This new addition included new classrooms, a fitness centre, a full gymnasium and underground parking. The new wing creates a functional courtyard for playgrounds while reducing the mass of the building along the residential streetscape. To preserve the highly valued outdoor playing field and tennis courts, the fitness centre, gymnasium and parking are located below ground and connected to the main building via a skylit corridor link. This new structure pays homage to the original architecture while bringing the school into the realm of 21st-century architecture.

Taking advantage of the COVID-19 shutdown, the entire front facade of the school including the chapel was restored which included 100% repointing, 100% stone cleaning and restoration of 87 metal / leaded windows in 2021.

== Notable alumni ==
- Viola Allen - Actress
- Thea Andrews - Actress and TV personality
- Margaret Bannerman - Actress
- Caroline Cameron - Sportsnet Anchor
- Margaret Campbell - Municipal and provincial politician
- Lin Chi-ling - Taiwanese model and actress
- Judith Clute - painter, graphic designer, print-maker, and illustrator
- Anne Innis Dagg - Canadian zoologist, biologist, feminist, and author of numerous books
- Marina Endicott - Canadian novelist
- Michelle Giroux - Canadian stage actress
- Kate Hewlett - Canadian actress, writer and songwriter
- Kai (Alessia De Gasperis Brigante) - Singer-songwriter
- Larysa Kondracki - Writer/director of The Whistleblower
- Emily Murphy - Canadian women's rights activist; first female judge in the British Empire
- Mary Louise Northway - Canadian psychologist
- Marjorie Pickthall - Poet and writer
- Valerie Pringle - Television host and journalist
- Ann Southam - Composer
- Veronica Tennant - Prima Ballerina (National Ballet Company of Canada)
- Linda Thorson - Actress, best known for her role in The Avengers.
- Daryl Watts - Hockey player
- Margaret Wente - Columnist for The Globe & Mail
- Beatrice Helen Worsley - first female computer scientist in Canada
- Emma Knight - Canadian novelist

== See also ==
- Education in Ontario
- List of secondary schools in Ontario
