= The Hidden Side of the Moon =

Collection of short stories by Joanna Russ

- First edition
- Cover artist: Kandy Littrell
- Language: English
- Genre: Science fiction
- Publisher: St. Martin's Press
- Publication date: January 1988
- Publication place: United States
- Pages: 229 pp
- ISBN: 0-312-01105-9
- OCLC: 317523235

The Hidden Side of the Moon is a feminist science fiction collection of short stories by Joanna Russ, first published in 1987 by St. Martin's Press. The collection covers stories published from 1959 ("Nor Custom Stale," Russ' first published story) to 1983.

== Contents ==
- "The Little Dirty Girl" (1982)
- "Sword Blades and Poppy Seed" (1983)
- "Main Street: 1953" (1983)
- "How Dorothy Kept Away the Spring" (1977)
- "This Afternoon" (1968)
- "This Night, At My Fire" (1966)
- "I Had Vacantly Crumpled It into My Pocket... But By God, Eliot, It Was a Photograph from Life!" (1964)
- "Come Closer" (1965)
- "It's Important to Believe" (1980)
- "Mr. Wilde's Second Chance" (1966)
- "Window Dressing" (1970)
- "Existence" (1975)
- "Foul Foul" (1971)
- "A Short and Happy Life" (1969)
- "The Throwaways" (1969)
- "The Clichés From Outer Space" (1975)
- "Elf Hill" (1982)
- "Nor Custom Stale" (1959)
- "The Experimenter" (1975)
- "Reasonable People" (1974)
- "Life in a Furniture Store" (1965)
- "Old Pictures" (1973)
  - "I. Visiting" (1967)
  - "II. Visiting Day" (1970)
- "Old Thoughts, Old Presences" (1975)
  - "I. The Autobiography of My Mother" (1975)
  - "II. Daddy's Little Girl" (1975)
