= Takayuki Tatsumi =

Japanese scholar (born 1955)

- 巽 孝之
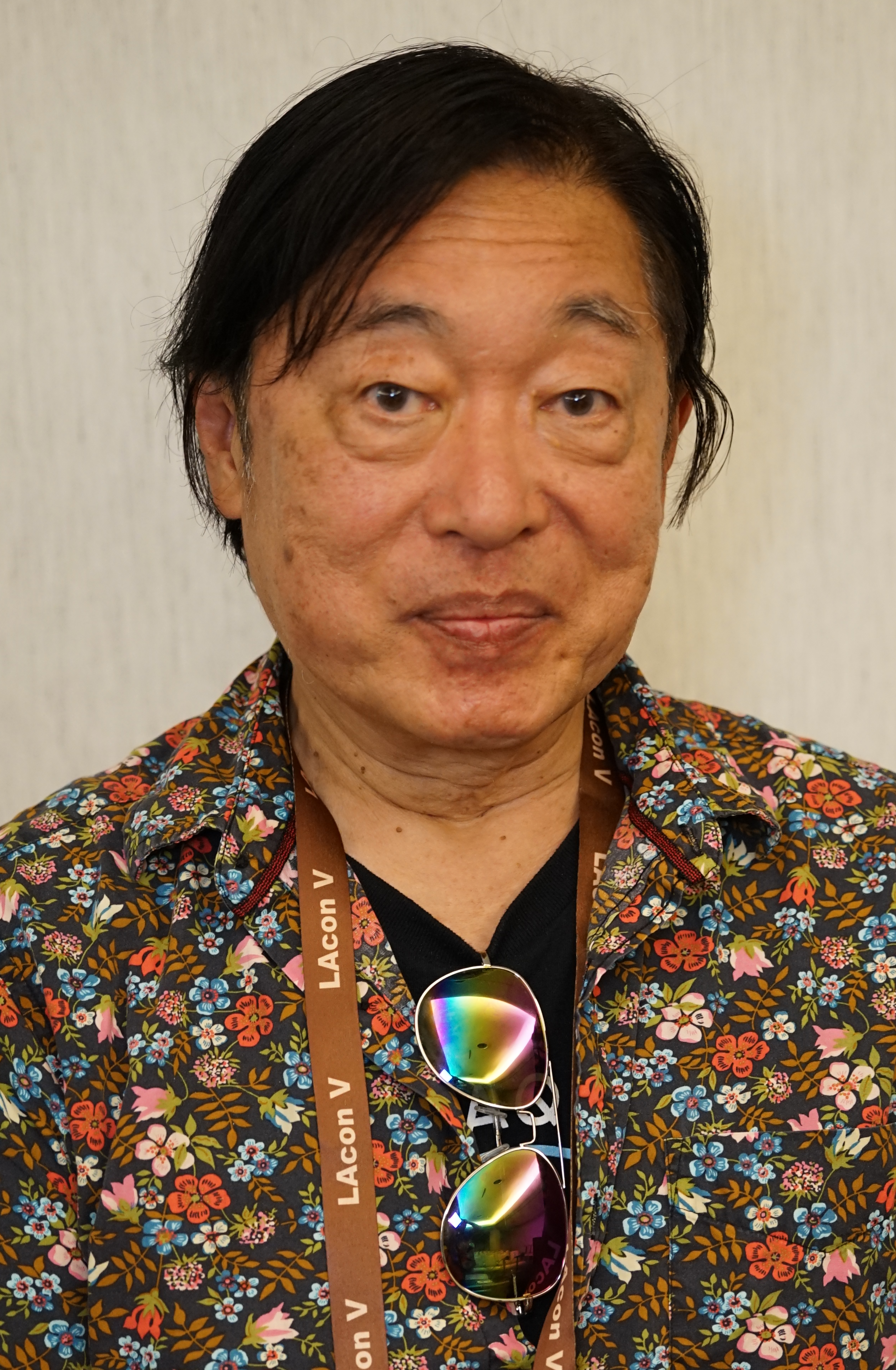
- Tatsumi at Worldcon 2026
- Born: May 15, 1955 (age 71); Tokyo, Japan
- Education: Sophia University, Cornell University
- Occupation: Professor at Keio University

Takayuki Tatsumi (巽 孝之, Tatsumi Takayuki; born May 15, 1955) is a Japanese scholar. He is a professor at Keio University, where he has taught literary theory and American literature since 1989.

As an avid science fiction fan, he authored many books and essays on science fiction. He received Nihon SF Taisho prize in 2000 for Nihon SF ronsōshi.

== Works ==
=== Single authorship ===
- (1988) Saibāpanku amerika (サイバーパンク・アメリカ Cyberpunk America)
- (1992) Gendai SF no retorikku (現代SFのレトリック Rhetoric of Contemporary Science Fiction)
- (1993) Metafikushon no bōryaku (メタフィクションの謀略 / Metafiction as Ideology)
- (1993) Japanoido sengen—gendai nihon SF o yomu tameni (ジャパノイド宣言 / A Manifesto for Japanoids)
- (1995) E. A. Pou o yomu (E・A・ポウを読む Disfiguration of Genres: A Reading in the Rhetorics of Edgar Allan Poe)
- (1995) Nyū amerikanizumu--beibungaku shisōshi no monogatarigaku (ニュー・アメリカニズム—米文学思想史の物語学 / New Americanist Poetics) (revised 2005)
- (1996) Nyūyōku no seikimatsu (ニューヨークの世紀末 / New York Decadence)
- (1997) Kyōryū no amerika (恐竜のアメリカ Dinosaur and America)
- (1997) "Comparative Metafiction: Somewhere between Ideology and Rhetoric"
- (1998) Nihon henryū bungaku (日本変流文学 / Slipstream Japan)
- (2000) Metafā wa naze korosareru—gendai hihyō kōgi (メタファーはなぜ殺される—現代批評講義 / Metaphor Murders)
- (2006) Full Metal Apache: Transactions Between Cyberpunk Japan and Avant-Pop America

=== As an editor ===
- (1991) Saibōgu feminizumu (サイボーグ・フェミニズム Cyborg Feminism) (revised 2001)
- (2000) Nihon SF ronsōshi (日本SF論争史 / Science Fiction Controversies in Japan: 1962–1997)
- (2007) Robot Ghosts and Wired Dreams: Japanese Science Fiction from Origins to Anime
