= Extra(ordinary) People =

1984 short story collection by Joanna Russ

- First edition
- Author: Joanna Russ
- Cover artist: Greg Scott
- Language: English
- Genre: Science fiction
- Publisher: St. Martin's Press
- Publication date: April 1984
- Publication place: United States
- Media type: Print (hardback & paperback)
- Pages: 161 pp
- ISBN: 0-312-27806-3
- OCLC: 9971278

Extra(ordinary) People is a 1984 collection of feminist science fiction stories by Joanna Russ. The novella "Souls" won the 1983 Hugo Award for the best novella.

== Contents ==
- "Souls" (1982) novella, originally published in F&SF, January 1982.
- "The Mystery of the Young Gentleman" (1982) novelette, originally published in Speculations ed. by Isaac Asimov and Alice Laurence
- "Bodies" (1984) novelette.
- "What Did You Do During the Revolution, Grandma?" (1983) novelette, originally published in The Seattle Review, Spring 1983.
- "Everyday Depressions" (1984) short story.
