= The Two of Them (novel) =

1978 science fiction novel by Joanna Russ

- First edition
- Author: Joanna Russ
- Cover artist: Norm Walker
- Language: English
- Genre: Science fiction
- Publisher: Berkley Books
- Publication date: May 1978
- Publication place: United States
- Media type: Print (hardback & paperback)
- Pages: 226
- ISBN: 0-399-12149-8 (hardcover)
- OCLC: 3516946
- Dewey Decimal: 813/.5/4
- LC Class: PZ4.R9548 Tw PS3568.U763

The Two of Them is a feminist science fiction novel by Joanna Russ. It was first published in 1978 in the United States by Berkley Books and in Great Britain by The Women's Press in 1986. It was last reissued in 2005 by the Wesleyan University Press with a foreword by Sarah LeFanu.

== Plot ==
Irene, a female galactic agent, rescues a young woman, Zubeydeh, from a male-dominant culture of a colonized planet, Ala-ed-deen, where women are kept in purdah.

...shivers generically between telling the realistic story of oppression -and escape- of a young woman brought up on a planet whose religion is reminiscent of Islam, and deconstructing this generic material into the embittered dreams of a woman trapped on Earth

— John Clute, "The Two of Them", from The Encyclopedia of Science Fiction

== Background ==
This novel uses characters and a setting from Suzette Haden Elgin's short story For the Sake of Grace with Elgin's permission. Russ discloses this in the novel's dedication page.
