= Science Fiction Studies =

Academic journal about science fiction

- Discipline: Science fiction
- Language: English
- Edited by: Sherryl Vint

Publication details
- History: 1973–present
- Publisher: SF-TH Inc. (United States)
- Frequency: Triannual

Standard abbreviations
- ISO 4: Sci. Fict. Stud.

Indexing
- ISSN: 0091-7729 (print); 2327-6207 (web)
- LCCN: 73644793
- JSTOR: 00917729
- OCLC no.: 301704877

Links
- Journal homepage

Science Fiction Studies (SFS) is an academic journal founded in 1973 by R. D. Mullen. The journal is published three times per year at University of California Press. As the name implies, the journal publishes articles and book reviews on science fiction, but also occasionally on fantasy and horror when the topic also covers some aspect of science fiction as well. Known as one of the major academic publications of its type, Science Fiction Studies is considered the most "theoretical" of the academic journals that publish on science fiction.

== History ==
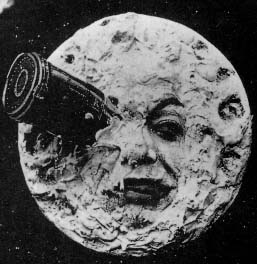
A still from Voyage a la Lune—this image is also the logo of the Science Fiction Studies journal.

SFS has had three different institutional homes during its lifetime. It was founded in 1973 at Indiana State University by the late English professor Dr. R. D. Mullen, where it remained for approximately five years. In 1978, it moved to McGill University and then to Concordia University in Montreal, Canada, where it was supported by a Canadian government grant until 1991. SFS was brought back to Indiana to DePauw University in 1992 where it has remained ever since. The parent company of SFS is SF-TH Inc., a not-for-profit corporation established under the laws of the State of Indiana.

== Peer review ==
SFS is refereed, selective (its acceptance rate averages around 37%), and its 900+ subscription base includes institutions and individuals in the US and Canada and more than 30 foreign countries. SFS has been called the world's most respected journal for the critical study of science fiction. Recognized as having brought a rigorous theoretical focus to the study of this popular genre, SFS has been featured in The Chronicle of Higher Education, where Jim Zook noted that "Since its founding... Science Fiction Studies has charted the course for the most hard-core science fiction critics and comparatists. That focus has earned the journal its reputation as the most theoretical scholarly publication in the field, as well as the most daring". SFS has also been reviewed in the Times Literary Supplement, where Paul Kincaid compared the world's three principal learned journals that focus on science fiction: Science Fiction Studies, Extrapolation (published at the University of Texas, Brownsville), and Foundation (published at the University of Liverpool, UK). He concluded that "Science Fiction Studies ... has always been resolutely academic, the articles always peer-reviewed ..., and with an uncompromising approach to the complexities of critical theory". On top of being the most theoretically sophisticated journal in the field, SFS also has the broadest coverage of science fiction outside the English language, with special issues on Science Fiction in France, Post-Soviet SF, Japanese SF, and Latin American SF.

== Format ==
SFS appears three times per year (March, July, and November) and averages 200 pages in length. A representative issue contains 5–8 articles ranging in length from 5,000 to 15,000 words, 2–3 review-essays, two dozen book reviews covering scholarly works, plus a substantial Notes and Correspondence section. Special issues follow the same format but are usually guest-edited. Recent special issue topics include Technoculture and Science Fiction, Afrofuturism, Latin American Science Fiction, Animal Studies and Science Fiction, Science Fiction and Sexuality, Italian Science Fiction, Digital Science Fiction, and Spanish Science Fiction, among others. A regular rotation of open and special issues has characterized the journal's publication schedule from the outset: roughly one-third of its 130+ issues have been special issues. These special issues often have a major impact on the field, setting critical agendas and initiating debates. Guest editors are drawn from the consulting board of 35 scholars, representing in their expertise the international scope of the field.

SFS offers both print and electronic subscriptions via University of California Press.

== See also ==
- Extrapolation
- Femspec
- Foundation: The International Review of Science Fiction
