= Joanna Russ =

American writer and academic (1937–2011)

- Russ in 1984. Portrait by Ileen Weber.
- Born: February 22, 1937; New York City, U.S.
- Died: April 29, 2011 (aged 74); Tucson, Arizona, U.S.
- Education: Cornell University (BA); Yale University (MFA)
- Occupations: Academic, feminist, fiction writer
- Writing career
- Genres: Feminist science fiction, fantasy
- Subject: Feminist literary criticism
- Notable works: "When It Changed", The Female Man, How to Suppress Women's Writing, To Write Like a Woman
- Notable awards: Hugo Award, Nebula Award, two James Tiptree, Jr. Awards, Locus Award, Gaylactic Spectrum Award, Pilgrim Award, Florence Howe award of the women's caucus of the MLA

Joanna Russ (February 22, 1937 – April 29, 2011) was an American writer, academic and feminist. She is the author of a number of works of science fiction, fantasy and feminist literary criticism such as How to Suppress Women's Writing, as well as a contemporary novel, On Strike Against God, and one children's book, Kittatinny. She is best known for The Female Man, a novel combining utopian fiction and satire, and the story "When It Changed".

== Background ==
Joanna Russ was born in The Bronx, New York City, to Evarett I. and Bertha (née Zinner) Russ, both teachers. Her family was Jewish. She began creating works of fiction at a very early age. Over the following years she filled countless notebooks with stories, poems, comics and illustrations, often hand-binding the material with thread.

As a senior at William Howard Taft High School, Russ was selected as one of the top ten Westinghouse Science Talent Search winners. She graduated from Cornell University, where she studied with Vladimir Nabokov, in 1957, and received her MFA from the Yale Drama School in 1960. She was briefly married to Albert Amateau.

Russ taught at Queensborough Community College from 1966 to 1967, at Cornell from 1967 to 1972, SUNY Binghamton, from 1972 to 1975, and at the University of Colorado, Boulder, from 1975 to 1977. In 1977 she started teaching at the University of Washington. She became a full professor in 1984 and retired in 1991. Russ was awarded a National Endowment for the Humanities fellowship in 1974-1975.

== Science fiction and other writing ==
Russ came to be noticed in the science fiction world in the late 1960s, in particular for her award-nominated novel Picnic on Paradise. At the time, SF was a field dominated by male authors, writing for a predominantly male audience, but women were starting to enter the field in larger numbers. Russ was one of the most outspoken female authors to challenge male dominance of the field, and is generally regarded as one of the leading feminist science fiction scholars and writers. She was also one of the first major science fiction writers to take slash fiction and its cultural and literary implications seriously. She published over fifty short stories. Russ was associated with the American New Wave of science fiction.

Along with her work as a writer of prose fiction, Russ was also a playwright, essayist, and author of nonfiction works, generally literary criticism and feminist theory, including the essay collection Magic Mommas, Trembling Sisters, Puritans & Perverts; How to Suppress Women's Writing; and the book-length study of modern feminism, What Are We Fighting For?. Her essays and articles have been published in Women's Studies Quarterly, Signs, Frontiers: A Journal of Women Studies, Science Fiction Studies, and College English. Russ was a self-described socialist feminist, expressing particular admiration for the work and theories of Clara Fraser and her Freedom Socialist Party. Both fiction and nonfiction, for Russ, were modes of engaging theory with the real world; in particular, The Female Man can be read as a theoretical or narrative text. The short story "When It Changed", which became a part of the novel, explores the constraints of gender and asks if gender is necessary in a society.

Russ's writing is characterized by anger interspersed with humor and irony. James Tiptree Jr, in a letter to her, wrote, "Do you imagine that anyone with half a functional neuron can read your work and not have his fingers smoked by the bitter, multi-layered anger in it? It smells and smoulders like a volcano buried so long and deadly it is just beginning to wonder if it can explode." In a letter to Susan Koppelman, Russ asks of a young feminist critic "where is her anger?" and adds "I think from now on, I will not trust anyone who isn't angry."

For nearly 15 years she was an influential (if intermittent) review columnist for The Magazine of Fantasy & Science Fiction. Though by then she was no longer an active member of science fiction fandom, she was interviewed by phone during Wiscon (the feminist science fiction convention in Madison, Wisconsin) in 2006 by her friend and member of the same cohort, Samuel R. Delany.

Her first SF story was "Nor Custom Stale" in F&SF (1959). Notable short works include Hugo winner and Nebula Award finalist "Souls" (1982), Nebula Award and Tiptree Award winner "When It Changed" (1972), Nebula Award finalists "The Second Inquisition" (1970), "Poor Man, Beggar Man" (1971), "The Extraordinary Voyages of Amélie Bertrand" (1979), and "The Mystery of the Young Gentlemen" (1982). Her fiction has been nominated for nine Nebula and three Hugo Awards, and her genre-related scholarly work was recognized with a Pilgrim Award in 1988. Her story "The Autobiography of My Mother" was one of the 1977 O. Henry Prize stories.

She wrote several contributions to feminist thinking about pornography and sexuality, including "Pornography by Women, for Women, with Love" (1985), "Pornography and the Doubleness of Sex for Women", and "Being Against Pornography", which can be found in her archival pieces located in the University of Oregon's Special Collections. These essays include very detailed descriptions of her views on pornography and how influential it was to feminist thought in the late 1980s and early 1990s. Specifically, in "Being Against Pornography", she calls pornography a feminist issue. Her issues with pornography range from feminist critiques to women's sexuality in general, maintaining that porn prevents women from freely expressing their sexual selves like men can. Russ believed that anti-pornography activists were not addressing how women experienced pornography created by men, a topic that she addressed in "Being Against Pornography".

== Reputation and legacy ==
Her work is widely taught in courses on science fiction and feminism throughout the English speaking world. Russ is the subject of Farah Mendlesohn's book On Joanna Russ and Jeanne Cortiel's Demand My Writing: Joanna Russ, Feminism, Science Fiction. Russ and her work are prominently featured in Sarah LeFanu's In the Chinks of the World Machine: Feminism and Science Fiction (1988).

She was named to the Science Fiction and Fantasy Hall of Fame in 2013. She was awarded a 2014 Solstice Award (since renamed the Kate Wilhem Solstice Award) by the SFWA.

Gwyneth Jones wrote a 2019 book about Joanna Russ that was part of the University of Illinois Press series called Modern Masters of Science Fiction.

In a 2004 essay about the connections between Russ's work and D. W. Griffith's film Intolerance, Samuel R. Delany describes her as being "one of the finest - and most necessary - writers of American fiction" since she published her first professional short story in 1959.

Her papers are part of the University of Oregon's Special Collections and University Archives.

== Critical writings ==
The late 1960s and 1970s marked the beginnings of feminist SF scholarship—a field of inquiry that was all but created single-handedly by Russ, who wrote many essays on feminism and science fiction that appeared in journals such as College English and Science Fiction Studies. Her article "Amor Vincit Foeminam: The Battle of the Sexes in Science Fiction" discussed men struggling against female-dominated dystopias and feminist utopias. She also contributed 25 reviews to The Magazine of Fantasy & Science Fiction, covering more than 100 books of all genres. In their article "Learning the 'Prophet Business': The Merril-Russ Intersection," Newell and Tallentire described Russ as an "intelligent, tough-minded reviewer who routinely tempered harsh criticism with just the sort of faint praise she handed out to Judith Merril," who in turn was among the foremost editors and critics in American science fiction in the late 1960s. Russ was also described as a fearless, incisive, and radical person, whose writing was often characterized as acerbic and angry.

Russ was acclaimed as one of science fiction's most revolutionary and accomplished writers. Helen Merrick claimed that Russ is an inescapable figure in science fiction history. James Tiptree Jr. once commented on how Russ could be an "absolute delight" one minute, but then she "rushes out and bites my ankles with one sentence." For example, Russ criticized Ursula K. Le Guin's 1969 The Left Hand of Darkness, which won both the 1969 Nebula and 1970 Hugo awards for best science fiction novel, arguing that gender discriminations that permeated science fiction by men showed up just as frequently in science fiction by women. According to Russ, Le Guin's novel represented these stereotypes.

Russ felt that science fiction gives something to its readers that cannot be easily acquired anywhere else. She maintained that science should be accurate, and seriousness is a virtue. She insisted on the unique qualities of her chosen genre, maintaining that science fiction shared certain qualities with art and its flexibility compared to other forms of writing. Russ was also interested in demonstrating the unique potentials of women science fiction writers. As her career moved into its second decade in the 1980s, she started to worry about reviewing standards. She once said, "The reviewer's hardest task is to define standards."

Russ's reviewing style was characterized by logic. She was attacked by readers because of her harsh reviews of Stephen R. Donaldson's Lord Foul's Bane (1977) and Joy Chant's The Grey Mane of Morning (1977). She organized these attacks into seven categories, taken from the cited article:

- Don't shove your politics into your reviews. Just review the books. "I will," Russ said, "when authors keep politics out of their books."
- You don't prove what you say; you just assert it. "There is no way to 'prove' anything in aesthetic or moral matters."
- Then your opinion is purely subjective. "I might be subjective, but not arbitrary. It is based on a critic's whole education."
- Everyone's entitled to his [sic] own opinion. "Writing is a craft too, and it can be judged. And some opinions are worth a good deal more than others."
- I knew it. You're a snob. "Science fiction is a small world that often doesn't look outside of its own bounds."
- You're vitriolic too. "The only way to relieve oneself of the pain that has to be endured by reading every line is to express one's opinions vividly, precisely, and compactly."
- Never mind all that stuff. Just tell me what I'd enjoy reading. "Bless you, what makes you think I know?"

However, she felt guilty about dire criticism. She apologized for her harsh words on Lloyd Biggle's The Light That Never Was (1972), saying, "It's narsty to beat up on authors who are probably starving to death on turnip soup (ghoti soup) but critics ought to be honest."

== Personal life ==
Around the time of the publication of The Female Man in 1975, Russ came out as a lesbian. However, Russ remained protective of her personal life, and as late as a December 1981 interview with Charles Platt, she was still evasive on the subject. In a further Platt interview published in Asimov's Science Fiction Magazine, V. 7 #3 (March 1983), as an addendum to the interview, she answered his question about her sexuality with "Sure I'm a lesbian."

=== Health ===
In her later life she published little, largely because she had chronic pain and myalgic encephalomyelitis/chronic fatigue syndrome (ME/CFS).

On April 27, 2011, it was reported that Russ had been admitted to a hospice after suffering a series of strokes. Samuel R. Delany was quoted as saying that Russ was "slipping away" and had long had a "do not resuscitate" order on file. She died early in the morning on April 29, 2011.

== Bibliography ==
=== Novels ===
- Picnic on Paradise (Ace Books, 1968)
- And Chaos Died (Ace Books, 1970)
- The Female Man (Bantam Books, 1975)
- We Who Are About To... (Dell, 1977)
- The Two of Them (Berkley/Putnam, 1978)
- On Strike Against God (Out & Out Books, 1980) (novella)

=== Short fiction collections ===
- Alyx (Gregg Press, 1976). Reprinted as The Adventures of Alyx (Timescape Books, 1983) and includes Picnic on Paradise.
- The Zanzibar Cat (Arkham House, 1983)
- Extra(ordinary) People (St. Martin's Press, 1984)
- The Hidden Side of the Moon (St. Martin's Press, 1988)

=== Children's fiction ===
- Kittatinny: A Tale of Magic (Daughters, Inc., 1978)

=== Play ===
- "Window Dressing" in The New Women's Theatre, edited by Honor Moore (Random House, 1977)

=== Non-fiction ===
- Speculations on the Subjunctivity of Science Fiction (1973)
- Somebody's Trying to Kill Me and I Think It's My Husband: The Modern Gothic (1973)
- How to Suppress Women's Writing (1983)
- Magic Mommas, Trembling Sisters, Puritans and Perverts: Feminist Essays (1985)
- To Write Like a Woman (1995)
- What Are We Fighting For?: Sex, Race, Class, and the Future of Feminism (1997)
- The Country You Have Never Seen: Essays and Reviews (2007)
