= We Who Are About To... =

1977 novella by Joanna Russ

- Author: Joanna Russ
- Language: English
- Genre: Science fiction
- Publisher: Dell Publishing
- Publication date: July 1977 (book)
- Publication place: United States
- Media type: Print (hardback & paperback)
- Pages: 170
- ISBN: 0-440-19428-8
- OCLC: 3160986

We Who Are About To... is a feminist science fiction novella by Joanna Russ. It first appeared in magazine form in the January 1976 and February 1976 issues of Galaxy Science Fiction and was first published in book form by Dell Publishing in July 1977.

== Plot ==
The story takes the form of an audio diary kept by the unnamed protagonist. A group of people, with no technical skills and scant supplies, are stranded on a planet and debate how to survive. The men in the group are dedicated to colonizing and populating the planet, but the unnamed female protagonist, who does not believe that long-term survival is possible, resists being made pregnant by them. Tensions escalate into violence, until finally she is forced to kill the other survivors in order to defend herself against rape. Left alone, she becomes increasingly philosophical, recounting her personal history in political agitation and attempting to chart the days and seasons even as she begins to hallucinate from hunger and loneliness. She experiences visions, first of the people she killed, and then of people from her past. Finally, weak from hunger, she resolves to kill herself.

== Reception ==
We Who Are About To... received poor reviews at the time of publication, and was panned by Spider Robinson writing in Analog, and by Algis Budrys in The Magazine of Fantasy and Science Fiction. Later reviews have been more positive, however; David Pringle referred to it as "a grim tale which inverts the usual of myth of human indomitability" in The Ultimate Guide to Science Fiction, and Sarah LeFanu said in In the Chinks of the World Machine: Feminism and Science Fiction that "for all its brevity [it] can withstand a multiplicity of readings. It is about how to die, then it is as much about how to live." Samuel R. Delany called We Who Are About To... "a damningly fine analysis of the mechanics of political and social decay", offering the interpretation that "Russ suggests that the quality of life is the purpose of living, and reproduction only a reparative process to extend that quality—and not the point of life at all... only feudal societies can really believe wholly that reproduction... is life's real point." In Slate Magazine, Noah Berlatsky calls it a gender-flipped version of Golding's Lord of the Flies.

== Publication history ==
- January 1976, United States, Galaxy Science Fiction, Jan 1976, ed. James Baen, publ. UPD Publishing Corporation, magazine
- February 1976, United States, Galaxy Science Fiction, Feb 1976, ed. James Baen, publ. UPD Publishing Corporation, magazine
- July 1977, United States, published by Dell Publishing, ISBN 0-440-19428-8, paperback
- May 1978, United States, published by Dell Publishing, ISBN 0-440-19428-8, paperback
- November 1978, Great Britain, published by Magnum Books, ISBN 0-417-03220-X, paperback
- December 1978, United States, published by Gregg Press, ISBN 0-8398-2495-5, hardcover
- August 1987, Great Britain, published by The Women's Press, ISBN 0-7043-4085-2, paperback
- March 2005, United States, published by Wesleyan University Press, ISBN 0-8195-6759-0, trade paperback
- February 2017, Great Britain, published by Penguin Books, ISBN 0-2412-5374-8, paperback
- October 2023, United States, in the anthology Joanna Russ: Novels & Stories, published by Library of America, ISBN 978-1-59853-753-6, hardcover
