= When It Changed =

- Short story by Joanna Russ
- Language: English
- Genre: Science fiction

Publication
- Published in: Again, Dangerous Visions
- Publication type: Short story
- Publisher: Doubleday
- Publication date: 1972

"When It Changed" is a science fiction short story by American writer Joanna Russ. It was first published in the anthology Again, Dangerous Visions.

== Synopsis ==
Janet Evason lives on Whileaway, an all-female human colony planet whose inhabitants produce offspring by combining ova because all their males died in a plague 30 generations earlier. When male astronauts arrive from Earth, they say that Earth has become genetically deficient and tell her that they would like to reproduce with women. Janet's wife tries to kill the astronauts; Janet stops her, but realizes that their very existence will change Whileaway society forever.

== Reception ==
"When It Changed" won the 1972 Nebula Award for Best Short Story, and was a finalist for the 1973 Hugo Award for Best Short Story.

== Themes and historical time period ==
In the afterword, Russ states that "When It Changed" was written to challenge ideas in science fiction that had not, at the time of writing, been addressed. These ideas were related to the way women—and societies consisting solely of women—were handled by writers who are male. She wrote:

I have read SF stories about manless worlds before; they are either full of busty girls in wisps of chiffon who slink about writhing with lust (Keith Laumer wrote a charming, funny one called "The War with the Yukks"), or the women have set up a static, beelike society in imitation of some presumed primitive matriarchy. These stories are written by men. Why women who have been alone for generations should "instinctively" turn their sexual desires toward persons of whom they have only intellectual knowledge, or why female people are presumed to have an innate preference for Byzantine rigidity, I don't know.

(Note: The Laumer story was actually named "War Against the Yukks".)

Russ also mentions Ursula K. Le Guin's novel The Left Hand of Darkness as an influence on the story.

In the "Image of Women in Science Fiction", Russ asserts that women have not been accurately portrayed in science fiction. She wrote:

There are plenty of images of women in science fiction. There are hardly any women.

"When It Changed" contains themes of queer theory and its contribution to the non-rigid definition of women's image. This in turn gives women the opportunity to not follow the defined past role of feminism and partake in queer relationships. The story's conclusion alludes to the ending of such an ideal when masculine/heterosexual forces threaten the character's way of life, and in turn, queer as a concept. The story emphasizes the rigidity of such forces through the steadfast beliefs of the alien species about the traditional gender roles. The alien's language equates the word people to men, implying the implicit sexist and masculine connotation behind the non-native's words, contrasting with Whileaway's current opinion on the role of women.

== Awards and nominations ==
- Nebula Award for Best Short Story, 1973
- Hugo Award for Best Short Story nominee, 1973
- James Tiptree, Jr. Award (retroactive, 1996)
